= Devin Jones =

American stock car racing driver

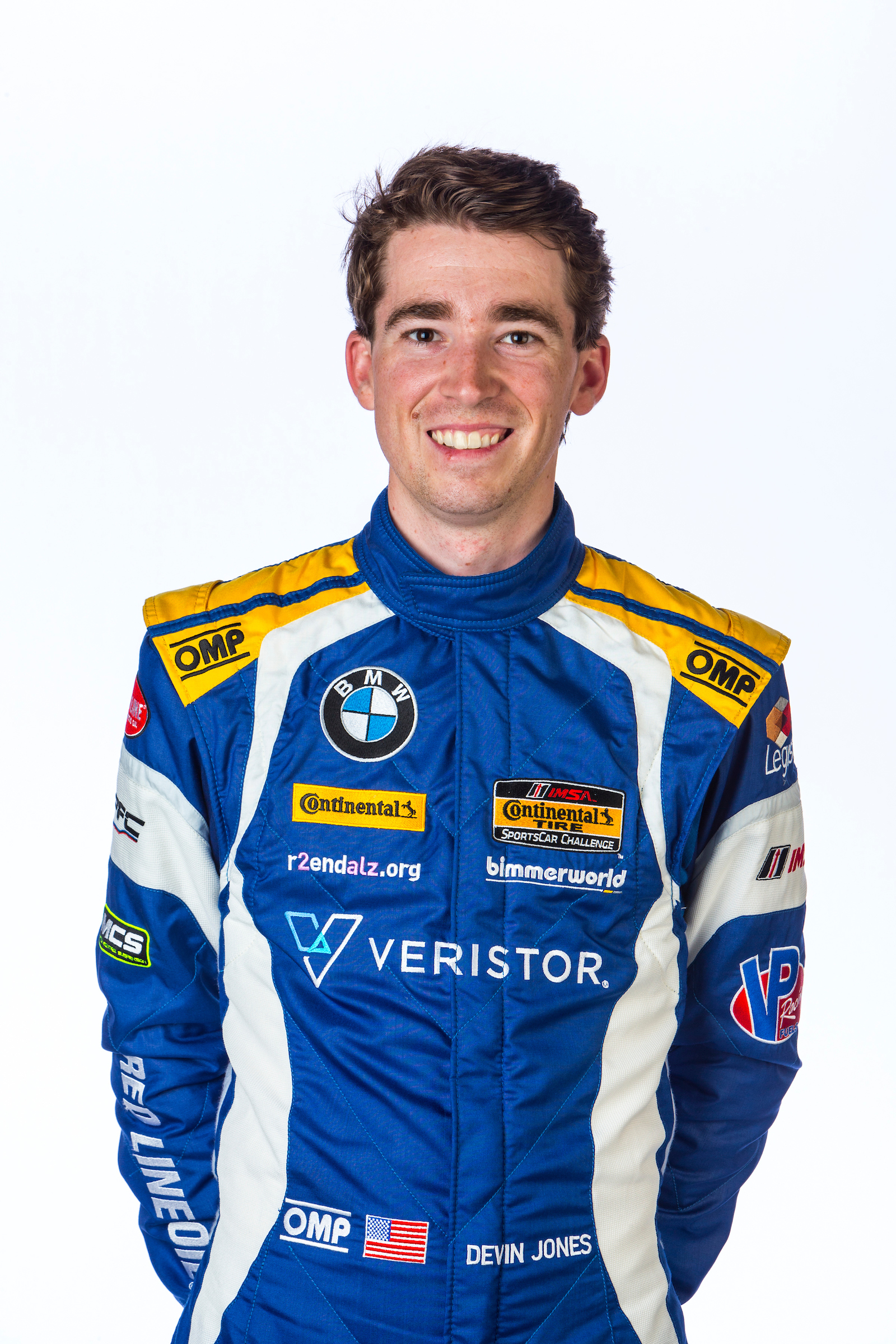
- Jones in 2018
- Born: November 24, 1994 (age 31); San Luis Obispo, California, U.S.
- Achievements: 2018 IMSA Michelin Pilot Challenge Champion

NASCAR O'Reilly Auto Parts Series career
- 2 races run over 2 years
- 2023 position: 68th
- Best finish: 69th (2017)
- First race: 2017 Zippo 200 at The Glen (Watkins Glen)
- Last race: 2023 Dead On Tools 250 (Martinsville Speedway)
Wins	Top tens	Poles
0	0	0

NASCAR FedEx Freight Truck Series career
- 1 race run over 1 year
- 2013 position: 65th
- Best finish: 65th (2013)
- First race: 2013 Kroger 250 (Martinsville)
Wins	Top tens	Poles
0	0	0
- Statistics up to date as of October 28, 2023.

Devin Shane Jones (born November 24, 1994) is an American professional stock car and sports car racing driver. He currently competes full-time in the IMSA Michelin Pilot Challenge, driving the No. 82 BMW M4 GT4 for BimmerWorld Racing.

== Early life ==
Devin Jones was born on Thanksgiving Day, November 24, 1994.

== Racing career ==
Jones was a successful World Karting Association and International Karting Federation driver, winning pairs of national titles in both sanctioning bodies in 2005 and 2006. He also won seven other local club championships from 2004 to 2005 at various tracks in Southern California.

Jones raced full-time in the US Legends Car Series in 2008, winning eight times at multiple tracks across the southeast and earning the pole position at the US Legends Car Nationals at Indy. He also finished second in the 2008 Summer Shootout at Charlotte Motor Speedway in the young lions division.

In 2009, Jones moved up into the heavier and more powerful Super Late Models in the Pro All Stars Series. Jones qualified on the outside pole in his first start at one of the biggest races of the season, the Easter Bunny 150 at Hickory Motor Speedway. He finished a best of third in the Independence Day 150 at Hickory Motor Speedway in July 2009.

Jones continued to run in the Pro All Stars Series in 2010 partnering with Jeff Fultz Racing. He finished the year with three top-fives and eight top-tens in 12 starts, along with leading 47 laps. In September 2010, Jones finished fifth in the Labor Day Classic 200 at North Wilkesboro Speedway, the first race at the track since Jeff Gordon won there in 1996. During that same weekend at North Wilkesboro Speedway in 2010, Jones was the first to break the track record during practice that had stood since 1994. Jones was ranked as one of the top-30 Late Model drivers in county in a report published in October 2010. In November 2010, Jones finished fifth in his first ever Skip Barber Racing Series event at Road Atlanta.

In 2011, Jones ran in the Skip Barber Racing Series. In January, he earned a pair of podiums at Homestead-Miami Speedway. Jones raced in the Skip Barber National Series at three different tracks with a best finish coming at Lime Rock Park. In May 2011, Jones tested a USF2000 car for Accelerace Motor Sports. He finished out the 2011 season racing a Late Model Stock in the NASCAR Whelen All-American Series at Hickory Motor Speedway. He scored one pole and had three top-fives and six top-tens in eight starts.

Jones ran full-time in the UARA-STARS Late Model tour in 2012 where he achieved his first UARA pole qualifying run at Caraway Speedway and finished the year with 28 laps led, two top-fives and eight top-tens. He was one of the leading rookies in the series, winning rookie of the race at Anderson Motor Speedway in June. Jones would place sixth in the final season standings.

2013 was a landmark year for Jones as he made his first start in the NASCAR Craftsman Truck Series driving a Young's Motorsports truck at Martinsville Speedway for the Kroger 250. Jones would qualify 26th and finish in the 24th position. He also ran part-time in the UARA-STARS late model stock touring series, recording five top-tens in six starts.

It was announced that in 2014, Jones would be returning his focus to road racing and competing in the Mazda MX-5 Cup for CJ Wilson Racing with sponsor VeriStor Systems. Jones would finish the season sixth in points, one of the top rookies, with a best finish of fourth at Road Atlanta during the Petit Le Mans weekend. Jones made a start in the NASA Racing Series in November and won in his first start, driving a Miata MX-5.

Jones would return to the Global MX-5 Cup in 2015 driving a VeriStor Systems sponsored entry. With top-five finishes at NOLA Motorsports Park and Canadian Tire Motorsports Park. He would also make his debut in the IMSA Continental Tire SportsCar Challenge. Jones would earn a pole position and set a new track record at Canadian Tire Motorsports Park in only his second IMSA start driving a Mazda MX-5 for ALARA Racing.

During the 2016 season, Jones ran full-time in the IMSA Continental Tire SportsCar Challenge driving a Porsche Cayman for Bodymotion Racing. Jones went on to claim a podium finish at Watkins Glen International, claim rookie of the year and finish the season fifth in the final points standings.

In 2017, Jones joined the No. 07 of SS-Green Light Racing for his NASCAR Xfinity Series debut at Watkins Glen International. He would make the race on qualifying speed and finish in the 26th position. Jones also continued to race for Bodymotion Racing in IMSA during the season, driving the No. 31 Porsche Cayman.

Jones ran a full season in the IMSA Michelin Pilot Challenge in 2018 driving for BimmerWorld Racing in a BMW. He would have a breakthrough season winning four races at Daytona, Mosport, Road America and Laguna Seca. He would also score three poles in that same season and won the ST championship in its last season as a class in IMSA.

The 2019 season saw continued success. Jones and new co-driver James Clay, owner of BimmerWorld Racing competed in the GS class in the IMSA, driving a BMW M4 GT4 car. The duo would score two podiums and Jones would set the fastest lap of the race three times at Watkins Glen International, Sebring International Raceway and Road Atlanta. The team would finish the season third in the final points standings in the ultra-competitive class.

The 2020 season started with hopes to run for the championship with the returning core team from 2019. After finishing fifth at the season opening race at Daytona International Speedway, the year was halted due to the COVID-19 pandemic. Shortly after the return to racing in the summer of 2020, Jones was injured in a crash at VIR during a practice session that put him out from the remainder of the year with serious injuries.

In 2021, Jones made his much awaited return to racing after an extensive recovery from injuries. He drove for the first time after recovering at a BMW test track in South Carolina, then officially drove a project BimmerWorld GT car at the Hyperfest event at VIR. His first pro race back would be the Intercontinental GT Challenge 8 Hour race at Indianapolis Motor Speedway. Jones impressed during his return to the seat, finishing fourth in the GT4 class driving the BimmerWorld #82 car.

The 2022 season saw Jones return to full-time racing in the ultra competitive GT4 America Series. Running in the Pro-Am category with BimmerWorld Racing, Jones had a strong season highlighted by a return to the podium at New Orleans Motorsports Park in the BMW M4 GT4 with co-driver James Walker Jr.

In 2023, Jones ran a limited schedule in the NASCAR Xfinity Series making his first attempt at the Charlotte Motor Speedway Roval for Mike Harmon Racing in the 74 car. The car had engine issues in practice and Jones failed to make a lap in qualifying. Jones returned a few weeks later to race at Martinsville Speedway for SS-Greenlight Racing, ten years after his first NASCAR start at the same track in 2013. Jones qualified 37th and did not finish due to engine issues.

Jones made his debut in the World Racing League in 2024 at Road Atlanta driving a Ford Mustang GT4 for Ford Performance Racing School Motorsports. He would finish second in the 8-hour event in the GTO class.

For the 2025 season, it was announced that Jones would be co-driving with Ford CEO Jim Farley in a Ford Mustang GT4 in select races, including events at Mid-Ohio Sports Car Course and Watkins Glen International Raceway, for FPRS Motorsports.

== Personal life ==
Jones is a graduate of the University of North Carolina at Charlotte. He lives in Mooresville, North Carolina as a professional driving instructor and coach for racing schools. Jones supports the National Multiple Sclerosis Society and is a competitive cyclist.

== Motorsports career results ==
=== NASCAR ===
(key) (Bold – Pole position awarded by qualifying time. Italics – Pole position earned by points standings or practice time. * – Most laps led.)

==== Xfinity Series ====
NASCAR Xfinity Series results
Year	Team	No.	Make	1	2	3	4	5	6	7	8	9	10	11	12	13	14	15	16	17	18	19	20	21	22	23	24	25	26	27	28	29	30	31	32	33	NXSC	Pts	Ref
2017	SS-Green Light Racing	07	Chevy	DAY	ATL	LVS	PHO	CAL	TEX	BRI	RCH	TAL	CLT	DOV	POC	MCH	IOW	DAY	KEN	NHA	IND	IOW	GLN; 26	MOH	BRI	ROA	DAR	RCH	CHI	KEN	DOV	CLT	KAN	TEX	PHO	HOM	69th	11	
2023	CHK Racing	74	Chevy	DAY	CAL	LVS	PHO	ATL	COA	RCH	MAR	TAL	DOV	DAR	CLT	PIR	SON	NSH	CSC	ATL	NHA	POC	ROA	MCH	IRC	GLN	DAY	DAR	KAN	BRI	TEX	ROV; DNQ	LVS	HOM			69th	1	
2023	SS-Green Light Racing	07	Chevy																																MAR; 37	PHO	69th	1	

==== Camping World Truck Series ====
NASCAR Camping World Truck Series results
Year	Team	No.	Make	1	2	3	4	5	6	7	8	9	10	11	12	13	14	15	16	17	18	19	20	21	22	NCWTC	Pts	Ref
2013	Young's Motorsports	6	Chevy	DAY	MAR; 24	CAR	KAN	CLT	DOV	TEX	KEN	IOW	ELD	POC	MCH	BRI	MSP	IOW	CHI	LVS	TAL	MAR	TEX	PHO	HOM	65th	20	

^{*} Season still in progress
^{1} Ineligible for series points
