= 2023 NASCAR Xfinity Series =

American motorsport season

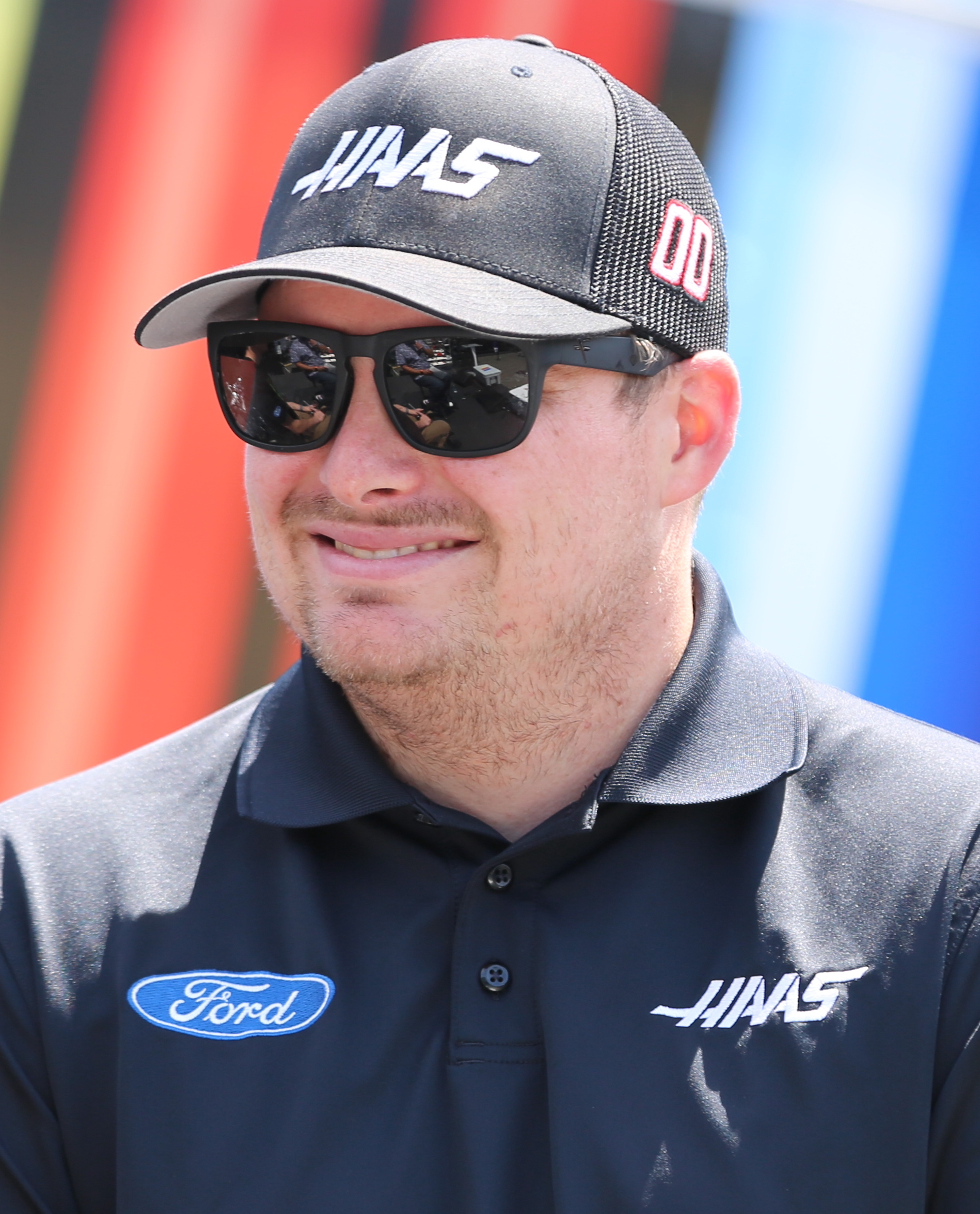
Cole Custer, the 2023 Xfinity Series champion.

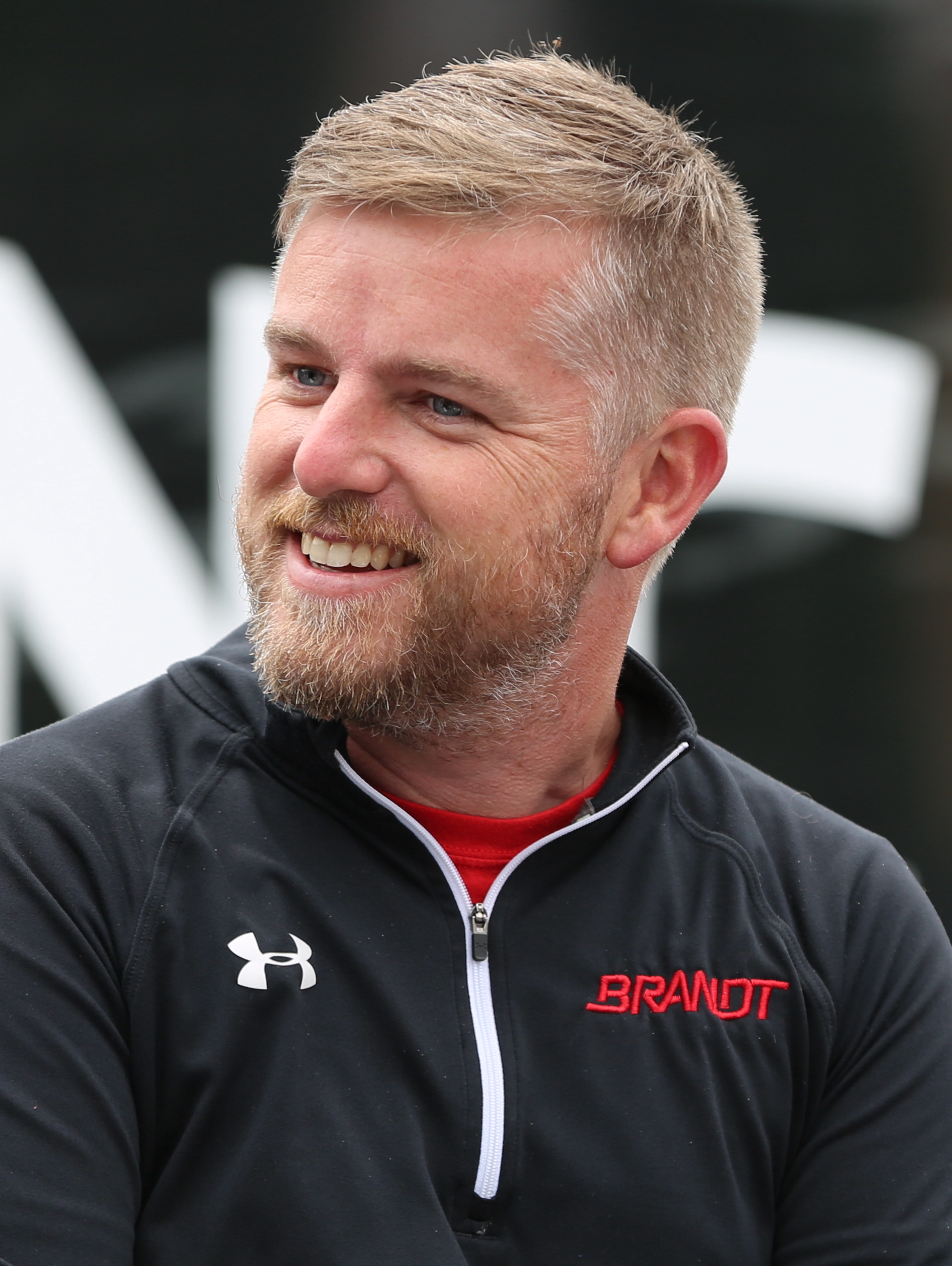
Justin Allgaier finished second in the championship.

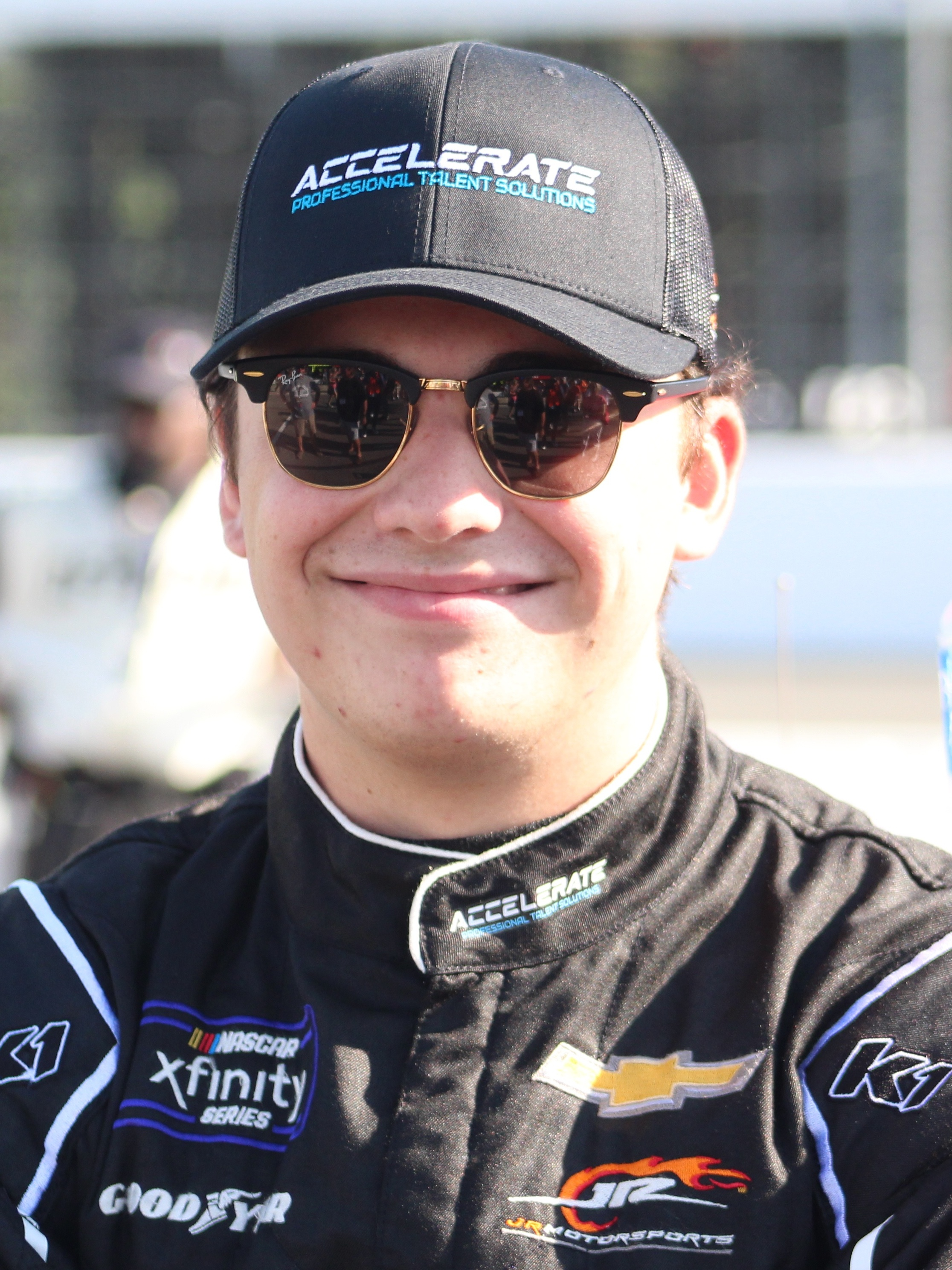
Sam Mayer finished third behind Custer in the championship.

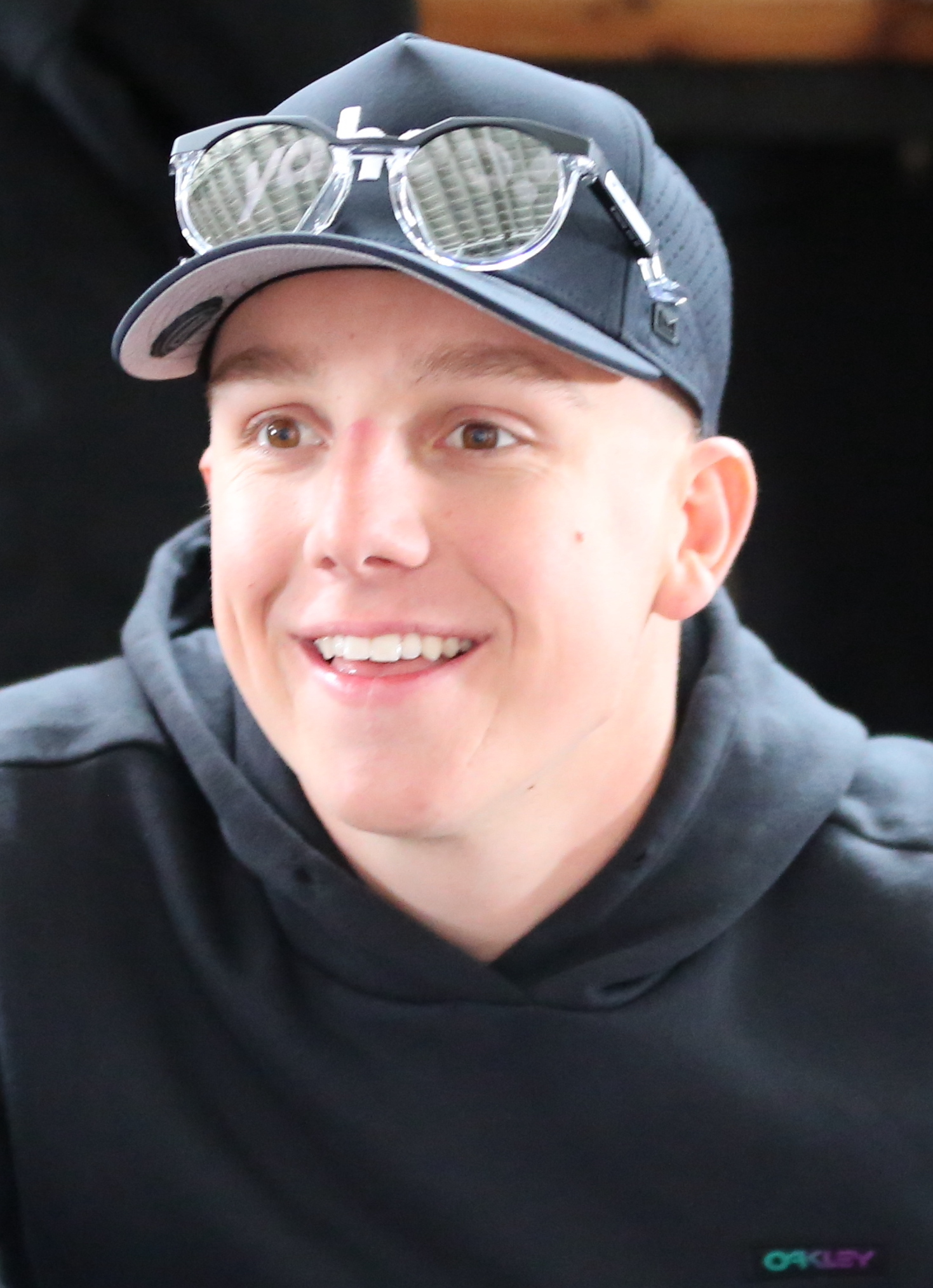
John Hunter Nemechek finished fourth in the championship.

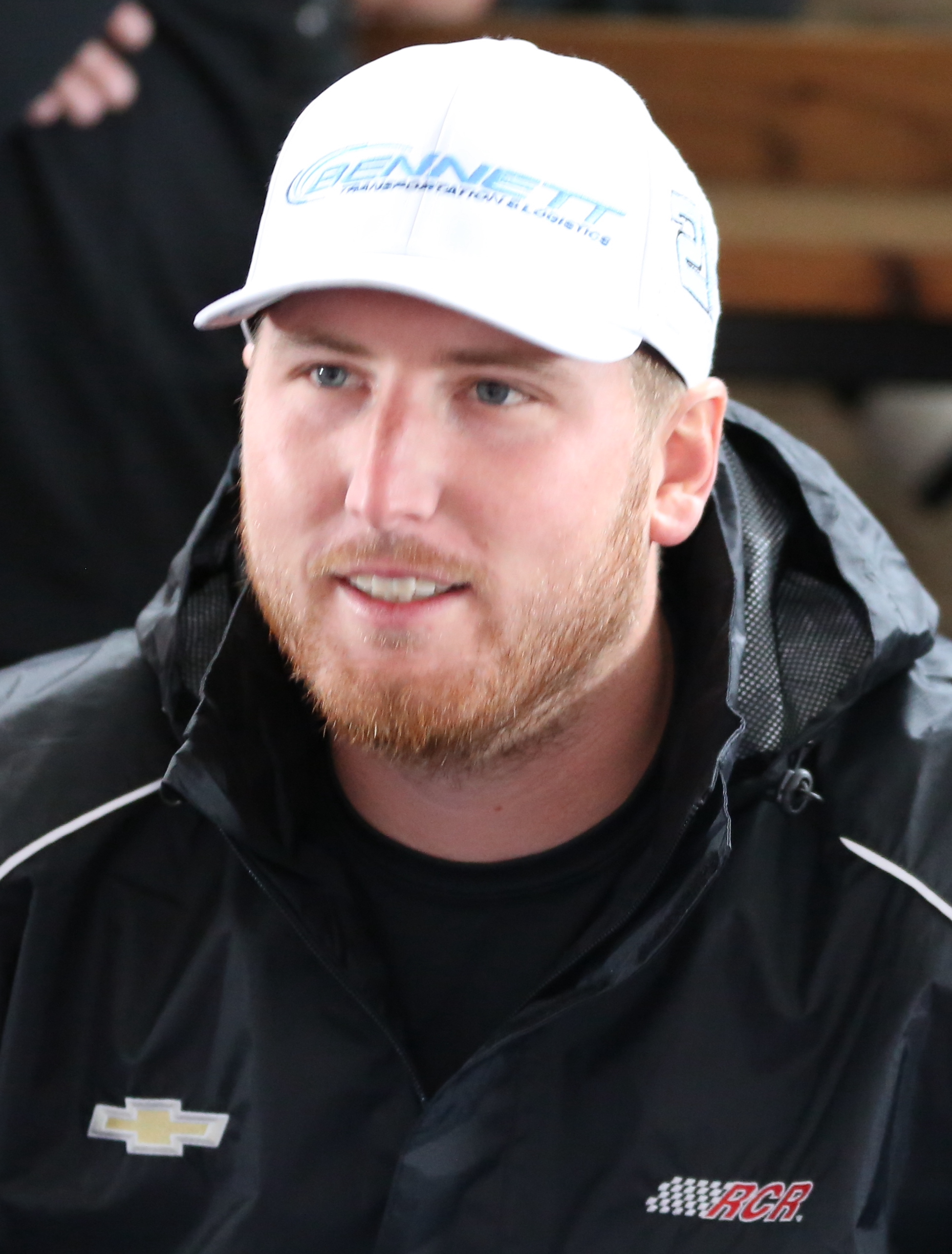
Austin Hill won the regular season championship, but finished fifth in the playoffs.

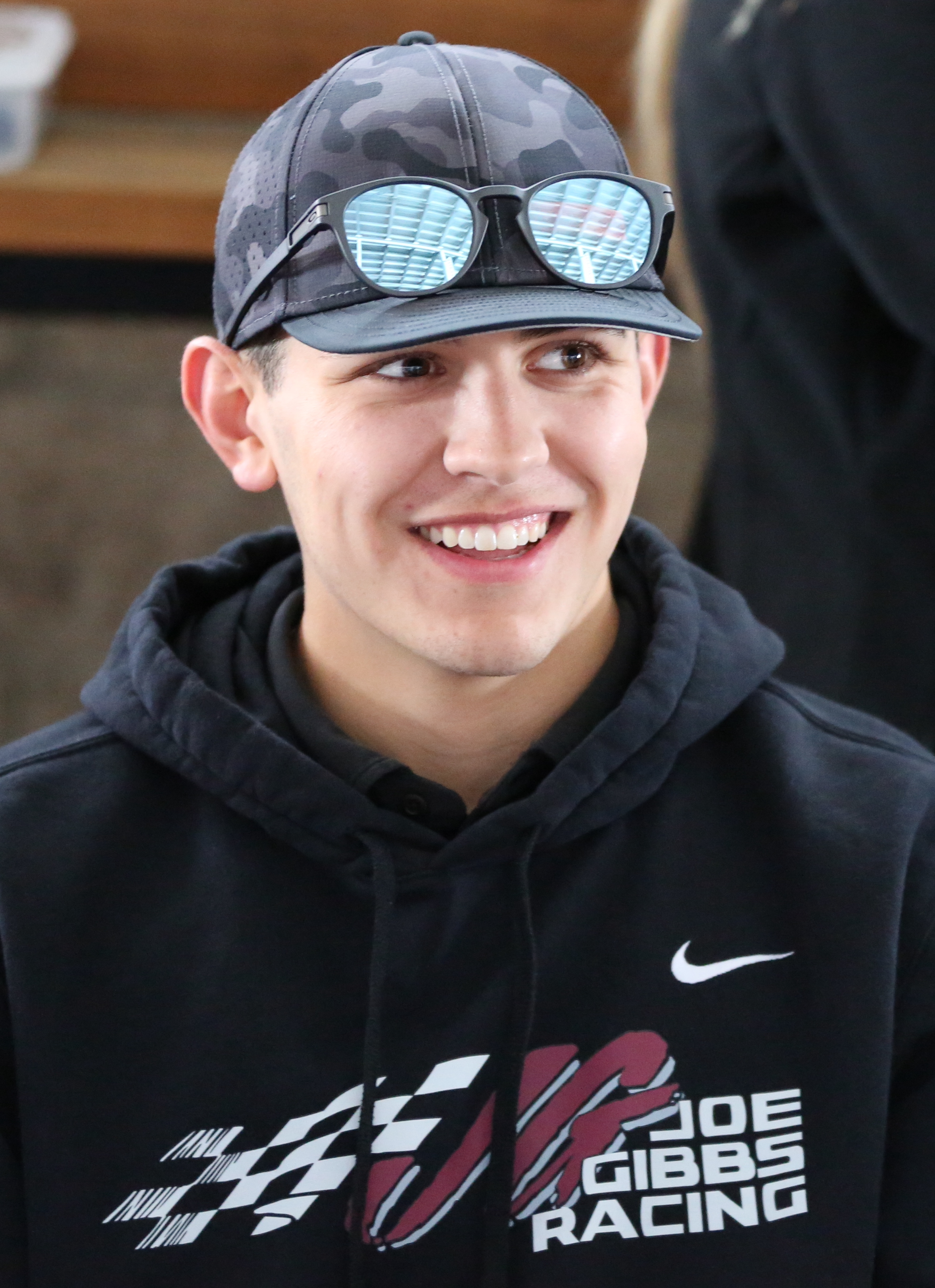
Sammy Smith, the 2023 NASCAR Xfinity Series Rookie of the Year.

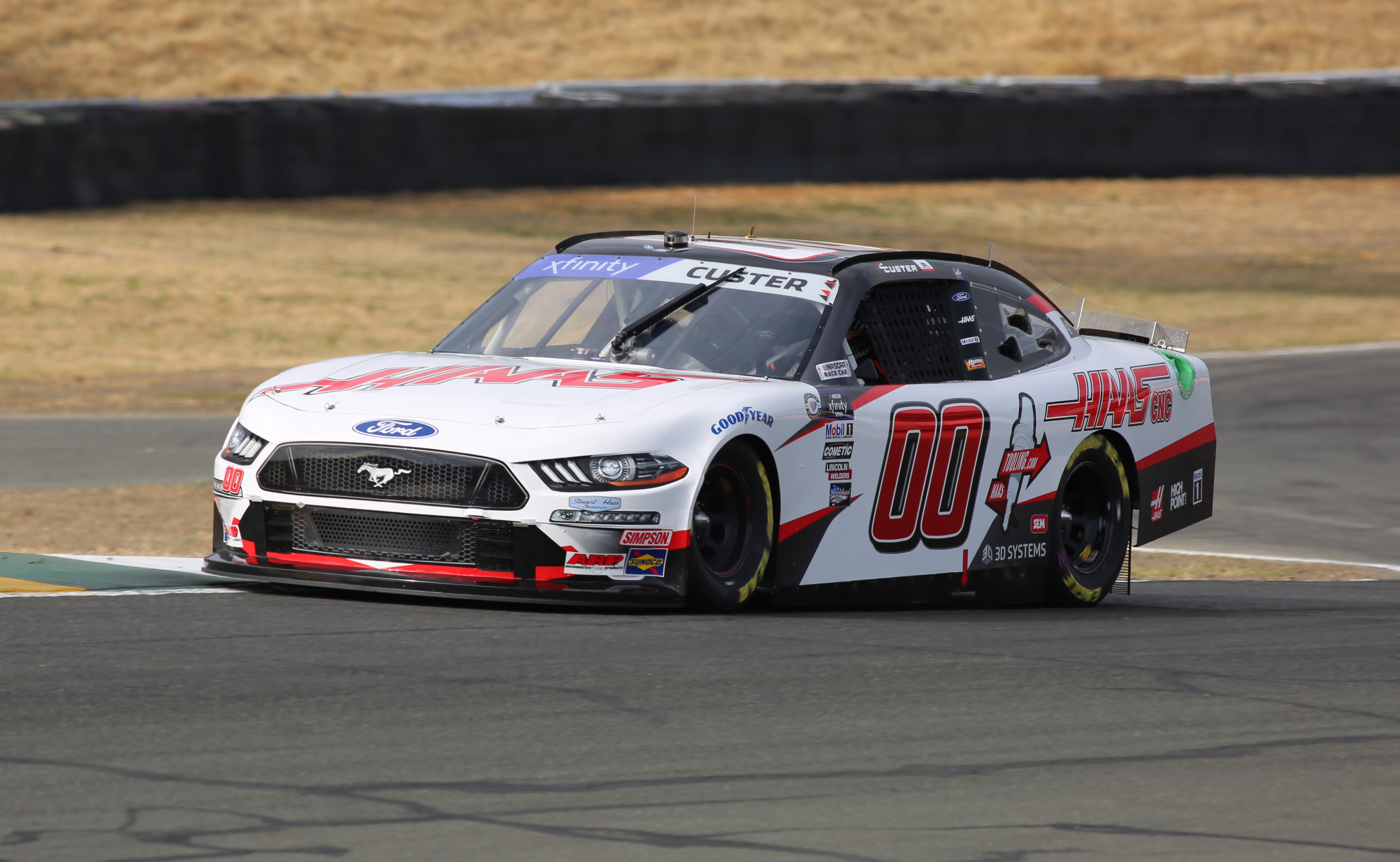
The Stewart–Haas Racing No. 00 car driven by Cole Custer won the owners' championship.

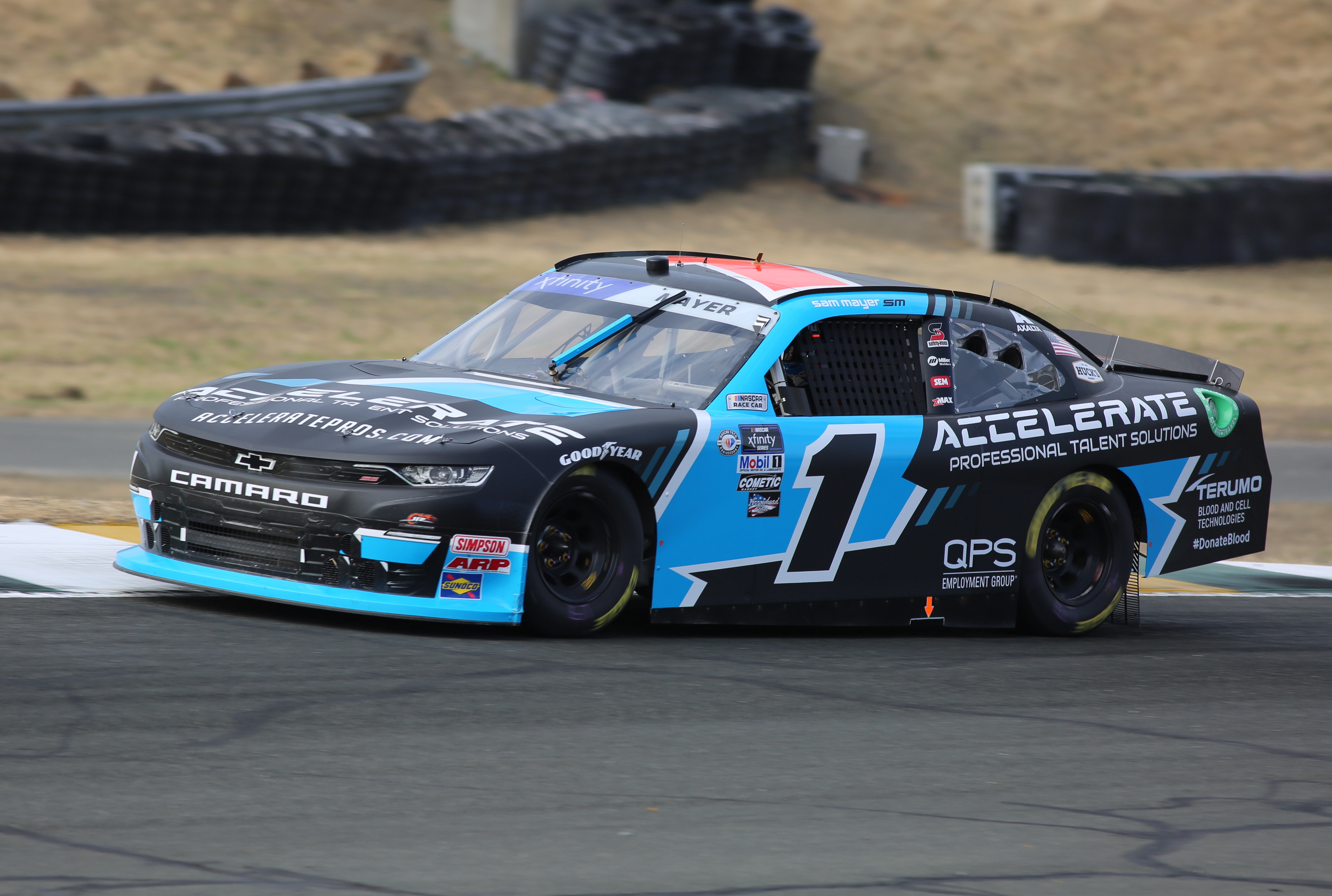
Chevrolet won the Xfinity Series manufacturers' championship with 1234 points and 17 wins.

The 2023 NASCAR Xfinity Series was the 42nd season of the NASCAR Xfinity Series, a stock car racing series sanctioned by NASCAR in the United States. The season started with the Beef. It's What's for Dinner. 300 on February 18 at Daytona International Speedway and ended with the NASCAR Xfinity Series Championship Race on November 4 at Phoenix Raceway. In addition, this was the penultimate season of Fox and NBC's TV contract for the Xfinity Series.

Ty Gibbs won the championship in 2022, but did not compete for a second consecutive title as he moved up to the Cup Series in 2023, driving full-time for Joe Gibbs Racing, replacing Kyle Busch. Following the 2023 Kansas Lottery 300 at Kansas Speedway, Austin Hill of Richard Childress Racing won the regular season championship. At season's end, Cole Custer of Stewart–Haas Racing became the 2023 Xfinity Series champion.

== Teams and drivers ==
=== Complete schedule ===
Manufacturer	Team	No.	Driver	Crew chief
Chevrolet	Alpha Prime Racing	44	Jeffrey Earnhardt 10	Michael Groves 10; Frank Kerr 9 Michael Brandt 1 James Long 1 Mike Hillman Sr. 12
Chevrolet	Alpha Prime Racing	44	Sage Karam 6	Michael Groves 10; Frank Kerr 9 Michael Brandt 1 James Long 1 Mike Hillman Sr. 12
Chevrolet	Alpha Prime Racing	44	Rajah Caruth 5	Michael Groves 10; Frank Kerr 9 Michael Brandt 1 James Long 1 Mike Hillman Sr. 12
Chevrolet	Alpha Prime Racing	44	Dylan Lupton 1	Michael Groves 10; Frank Kerr 9 Michael Brandt 1 James Long 1 Mike Hillman Sr. 12
Chevrolet	Alpha Prime Racing	44	Greg Van Alst 1	Michael Groves 10; Frank Kerr 9 Michael Brandt 1 James Long 1 Mike Hillman Sr. 12
Chevrolet	Alpha Prime Racing	44	Brad Perez 1	Michael Groves 10; Frank Kerr 9 Michael Brandt 1 James Long 1 Mike Hillman Sr. 12
Chevrolet	Alpha Prime Racing	44	Mason Massey 1	Michael Groves 10; Frank Kerr 9 Michael Brandt 1 James Long 1 Mike Hillman Sr. 12
Chevrolet	Alpha Prime Racing	44	Conor Daly 1	Michael Groves 10; Frank Kerr 9 Michael Brandt 1 James Long 1 Mike Hillman Sr. 12
Chevrolet	Alpha Prime Racing	44	Stefan Parsons 1	Michael Groves 10; Frank Kerr 9 Michael Brandt 1 James Long 1 Mike Hillman Sr. 12
Chevrolet	Alpha Prime Racing	44	Caesar Bacarella 1	Michael Groves 10; Frank Kerr 9 Michael Brandt 1 James Long 1 Mike Hillman Sr. 12
Chevrolet	Alpha Prime Racing	44	Dawson Cram 1	Michael Groves 10; Frank Kerr 9 Michael Brandt 1 James Long 1 Mike Hillman Sr. 12
Chevrolet	Alpha Prime Racing	44	Leland Honeyman 2	Michael Groves 10; Frank Kerr 9 Michael Brandt 1 James Long 1 Mike Hillman Sr. 12
Chevrolet	Alpha Prime Racing	44	Daniel Dye 2	Michael Groves 10; Frank Kerr 9 Michael Brandt 1 James Long 1 Mike Hillman Sr. 12
Chevrolet	Alpha Prime Racing	45	Caesar Bacarella 1 (Note: At Daytona in February (race #1), Caesar Bacarella suffered from stomach issues after qualifying and was replaced by Stefan Parsons in the race.)	Frank Kerr 22; Michael Brandt 1 Michael Groves 1 Gene Nead 4 James Long 4 Mike Hillman Sr. 1
Chevrolet	Alpha Prime Racing	45	Stefan Parsons 1	Frank Kerr 22; Michael Brandt 1 Michael Groves 1 Gene Nead 4 James Long 4 Mike Hillman Sr. 1
Chevrolet	Alpha Prime Racing	45	Rajah Caruth 6	Frank Kerr 22; Michael Brandt 1 Michael Groves 1 Gene Nead 4 James Long 4 Mike Hillman Sr. 1
Chevrolet	Alpha Prime Racing	45	Leland Honeyman 6	Frank Kerr 22; Michael Brandt 1 Michael Groves 1 Gene Nead 4 James Long 4 Mike Hillman Sr. 1
Chevrolet	Alpha Prime Racing	45	Sage Karam 3	Frank Kerr 22; Michael Brandt 1 Michael Groves 1 Gene Nead 4 James Long 4 Mike Hillman Sr. 1
Chevrolet	Alpha Prime Racing	45	Jeffrey Earnhardt 15	Frank Kerr 22; Michael Brandt 1 Michael Groves 1 Gene Nead 4 James Long 4 Mike Hillman Sr. 1
Chevrolet	Alpha Prime Racing	45	Ryan Ellis 1	Frank Kerr 22; Michael Brandt 1 Michael Groves 1 Gene Nead 4 James Long 4 Mike Hillman Sr. 1
Chevrolet	Alpha Prime Racing	45	Greg Van Alst 1	Frank Kerr 22; Michael Brandt 1 Michael Groves 1 Gene Nead 4 James Long 4 Mike Hillman Sr. 1
Chevrolet	Big Machine Racing	48	Parker Kligerman	Patrick Donahue
Chevrolet	B. J. McLeod Motorsports	78	Anthony Alfredo	Pat Tryson
Chevrolet	DGM Racing	91	Josh Bilicki 8	Mario Gosselin 18; Bryan Berry 15
Chevrolet	DGM Racing	91	Ross Chastain 6	Mario Gosselin 18; Bryan Berry 15
Chevrolet	DGM Racing	91	Garrett Smithley 1	Mario Gosselin 18; Bryan Berry 15
Chevrolet	DGM Racing	91	Chad Chastain 4	Mario Gosselin 18; Bryan Berry 15
Chevrolet	DGM Racing	91	Alex Labbé 5	Mario Gosselin 18; Bryan Berry 15
Chevrolet	DGM Racing	91	Kyle Weatherman 7	Mario Gosselin 18; Bryan Berry 15
Chevrolet	DGM Racing	91	Dexter Bean 1	Mario Gosselin 18; Bryan Berry 15
Chevrolet	DGM Racing	91	Alex Guenette 1	Mario Gosselin 18; Bryan Berry 15
Chevrolet	DGM Racing	92	Josh Williams 32	Bryan Berry 17; Mario Gosselin 15; Doug George 1
Chevrolet	DGM Racing	92	Alex Labbé 1	Bryan Berry 17; Mario Gosselin 15; Doug George 1
Chevrolet	JD Motorsports	4	Bayley Currey 4	Wayne Carroll Jr. 7 Robert Goodman 26
Chevrolet	JD Motorsports	4	Garrett Smithley 15	Wayne Carroll Jr. 7 Robert Goodman 26
Chevrolet	JD Motorsports	4	Ty Dillon 1	Wayne Carroll Jr. 7 Robert Goodman 26
Chevrolet	JD Motorsports	4	Kyle Weatherman 10	Wayne Carroll Jr. 7 Robert Goodman 26
Chevrolet	JD Motorsports	4	J. J. Yeley 2	Wayne Carroll Jr. 7 Robert Goodman 26
Chevrolet	JD Motorsports	4	Stefan Parsons 1	Wayne Carroll Jr. 7 Robert Goodman 26
Chevrolet	JD Motorsports	6	Brennan Poole 32	Kase Kallenbach
Chevrolet	JD Motorsports	6	Garrett Smithley 1	Kase Kallenbach
Chevrolet	Jeremy Clements Racing	51	Jeremy Clements	Mark Setzer
Chevrolet	Jordan Anderson Racing	27	Jeb Burton 32 (Note: Burton is running the full season split between the Jordan Anderson Racing Nos. 27 and 22 cars.)	Shane Whitbeck 32; Larry McReynolds 1
Chevrolet	Jordan Anderson Racing	27	Jordan Anderson 1	Shane Whitbeck 32; Larry McReynolds 1
Chevrolet	Jordan Anderson Racing	31	Parker Retzlaff (R)	Joshua Graham
Chevrolet	JR Motorsports	1	Sam Mayer	Mardy Lindley 32; Andrew Overstreet 1
Chevrolet	JR Motorsports	7	Justin Allgaier	Jim Pohlman
Chevrolet	JR Motorsports	8	Josh Berry	Taylor Moyer
Chevrolet	JR Motorsports	9	Brandon Jones	Jason Burdett
Chevrolet	Kaulig Racing	10	Justin Haley 5 (Note: At Charlotte (race #12), Kyle Busch qualified the No. 10 car but after the race was postponed to the same day as the Coca-Cola 600 (both were on Monday), Busch decided to not run the Xfinity race to focus on the Cup Series race and was replaced by Justin Haley, which is why they are both listed in the No. 10 car for that race.)	Alex Yontz
Chevrolet	Kaulig Racing	10	Austin Dillon 2	Alex Yontz
Chevrolet	Kaulig Racing	10	Kyle Busch 5	Alex Yontz
Chevrolet	Kaulig Racing	10	A. J. Allmendinger 5	Alex Yontz
Chevrolet	Kaulig Racing	10	Derek Kraus 4	Alex Yontz
Chevrolet	Kaulig Racing	10	Kyle Larson 1	Alex Yontz
Chevrolet	Kaulig Racing	10	Jordan Taylor 1	Alex Yontz
Chevrolet	Kaulig Racing	10	Justin Marks 1	Alex Yontz
Chevrolet	Kaulig Racing	10	Daniel Suárez 1	Alex Yontz
Chevrolet	Kaulig Racing	10	Ross Chastain 1	Alex Yontz
Chevrolet	Kaulig Racing	10	Daniel Hemric 8 (Note: Hemric is running the full season split between the Nos. 11 and 10 Kaulig Racing cars.)	Alex Yontz
Chevrolet	Kaulig Racing	11	Daniel Hemric 25	Jason Trinchere
Chevrolet	Kaulig Racing	11	Derek Kraus 4	Jason Trinchere
Chevrolet	Kaulig Racing	11	Layne Riggs 3	Jason Trinchere
Chevrolet	Kaulig Racing	11	Jordan Taylor 1	Jason Trinchere
Chevrolet	Kaulig Racing	16	Chandler Smith (R)	Bruce Schlicker
Chevrolet	Our Motorsports	02	David Starr 2	Teddy Brown 6 Dan Stillman 26; Matt Weber 1
Chevrolet	Our Motorsports	02	Kyle Weatherman 5	Teddy Brown 6 Dan Stillman 26; Matt Weber 1
Chevrolet	Our Motorsports	02	Blaine Perkins 26	Teddy Brown 6 Dan Stillman 26; Matt Weber 1
Chevrolet	Richard Childress Racing	2	Sheldon Creed	Jeff Stankiewicz 32; Sam Bowers 1
Chevrolet	Richard Childress Racing	21	Austin Hill	Andy Street
Ford	AM Racing	25	Brett Moffitt	Joe Williams Jr.
Ford	RSS Racing	28	Kyle Sieg 22	Brad Parrott 8 Steve Addington 3 Teddy Brown 14; Allen Chambers 3 Kevin Johnson 4 Jerry Kennedy 1
Ford	RSS Racing	28	Alex Labbé 2	Brad Parrott 8 Steve Addington 3 Teddy Brown 14; Allen Chambers 3 Kevin Johnson 4 Jerry Kennedy 1
Ford	RSS Racing	28	Aric Almirola 1 (Note: Entries were fielded in a collaboration with Stewart–Haas Racing.)	Brad Parrott 8 Steve Addington 3 Teddy Brown 14; Allen Chambers 3 Kevin Johnson 4 Jerry Kennedy 1
Ford	RSS Racing	28	Zane Smith 1 (Note: Entry was fielded in a collaboration with Front Row Motorsports.)	Brad Parrott 8 Steve Addington 3 Teddy Brown 14; Allen Chambers 3 Kevin Johnson 4 Jerry Kennedy 1
Ford	RSS Racing	28	Brent Sherman 1	Brad Parrott 8 Steve Addington 3 Teddy Brown 14; Allen Chambers 3 Kevin Johnson 4 Jerry Kennedy 1
Ford	RSS Racing	28	C. J. McLaughlin 5	Brad Parrott 8 Steve Addington 3 Teddy Brown 14; Allen Chambers 3 Kevin Johnson 4 Jerry Kennedy 1
Ford	RSS Racing	28	Joe Graf Jr. 1 (Note: Graf Jr. is running the full season split between the Nos. 39, 38 and 28 RSS Racing cars and the Joe Gibbs Racing No. 19 car.)	Brad Parrott 8 Steve Addington 3 Teddy Brown 14; Allen Chambers 3 Kevin Johnson 4 Jerry Kennedy 1
Ford	RSS Racing	38	Ryan Sieg 1 (Note: Ryan Sieg is running the full season split between the Nos. 38 and 39 RSS Racing cars.)	Steve Addington 29; Brad Parrott 2 Mike Scearce 2
Ford	RSS Racing	38	Kyle Sieg 4	Steve Addington 29; Brad Parrott 2 Mike Scearce 2
Ford	RSS Racing	38	Joe Graf Jr. 25	Steve Addington 29; Brad Parrott 2 Mike Scearce 2
Ford	RSS Racing	38	Chris Hacker 2	Steve Addington 29; Brad Parrott 2 Mike Scearce 2
Ford	RSS Racing	38	Nick Leitz 1	Steve Addington 29; Brad Parrott 2 Mike Scearce 2
Ford	RSS Racing	39	Joe Graf Jr. 1	Mike Scearce 30; Matt Noyce 3
Ford	RSS Racing	39	Ryan Sieg 32	Mike Scearce 30; Matt Noyce 3
Ford	Stewart–Haas Racing	00	Cole Custer	Jonathan Toney 32; Greg Zipadelli 1
Ford	Stewart–Haas Racing	98	Riley Herbst	Richard Boswell 14; Davin Restivo 19
Toyota	Joe Gibbs Racing	18	Sammy Smith (R)	Jeff Meendering
Toyota	Joe Gibbs Racing	19	Myatt Snider 6	Jason Ratcliff
Toyota	Joe Gibbs Racing	19	Joe Graf Jr. 6	Jason Ratcliff
Toyota	Joe Gibbs Racing	19	Ryan Truex 6	Jason Ratcliff
Toyota	Joe Gibbs Racing	19	Ty Gibbs 8	Jason Ratcliff
Toyota	Joe Gibbs Racing	19	Connor Mosack 3	Jason Ratcliff
Toyota	Joe Gibbs Racing	19	Trevor Bayne 3	Jason Ratcliff
Toyota	Joe Gibbs Racing	19	Denny Hamlin 1	Jason Ratcliff
Toyota	Joe Gibbs Racing	20	John Hunter Nemechek	Ben Beshore
Toyota	Sam Hunt Racing	24	Parker Chase 5	Kris Bowen
Toyota	Sam Hunt Racing	24	Tyler Reddick 2	Kris Bowen
Toyota	Sam Hunt Racing	24	Connor Mosack 21	Kris Bowen
Toyota	Sam Hunt Racing	24	Corey Heim 4	Kris Bowen
Toyota	Sam Hunt Racing	24	Sage Karam 1	Kris Bowen
Toyota	Sam Hunt Racing	26	Kaz Grala	Allen Hart
Chevrolet 32 Ford 1	Alpha Prime Racing	43	Ryan Ellis 30 (Note: Entry was fielded in a collaboration with MBM Motorsports at Las Vegas II (race #30).)	Michael Brandt 29; Frank Kerr 2 Derek Peebles 1 Carl Long 1
Chevrolet 32 Ford 1	Alpha Prime Racing	43	Caesar Bacarella 1	Michael Brandt 29; Frank Kerr 2 Derek Peebles 1 Carl Long 1
Chevrolet 32 Ford 1	Alpha Prime Racing	43	Leland Honeyman 1 (Note: Brad Perez relieved Honeyman in the No. 43 car during the race at Portland (race #13) due to Honeyman suffering from food poisoning on the day of the race.)	Michael Brandt 29; Frank Kerr 2 Derek Peebles 1 Carl Long 1
Chevrolet 32 Ford 1	Alpha Prime Racing	43	Dylan Lupton 1	Michael Brandt 29; Frank Kerr 2 Derek Peebles 1 Carl Long 1
Chevrolet 31 Ford 2	SS-Green Light Racing	07	Blaine Perkins 5	Mike Hillman Sr. 19; Daniel Johnson 10; Jason Miller 3 Teddy Brown 1
Chevrolet 31 Ford 2	SS-Green Light Racing	07	Carson Hocevar 1	Mike Hillman Sr. 19; Daniel Johnson 10; Jason Miller 3 Teddy Brown 1
Chevrolet 31 Ford 2	SS-Green Light Racing	07	Stefan Parsons 11	Mike Hillman Sr. 19; Daniel Johnson 10; Jason Miller 3 Teddy Brown 1
Chevrolet 31 Ford 2	SS-Green Light Racing	07	Dawson Cram 3	Mike Hillman Sr. 19; Daniel Johnson 10; Jason Miller 3 Teddy Brown 1
Chevrolet 31 Ford 2	SS-Green Light Racing	07	David Starr 2	Mike Hillman Sr. 19; Daniel Johnson 10; Jason Miller 3 Teddy Brown 1
Chevrolet 31 Ford 2	SS-Green Light Racing	07	Daniel Suárez 1	Mike Hillman Sr. 19; Daniel Johnson 10; Jason Miller 3 Teddy Brown 1
Chevrolet 31 Ford 2	SS-Green Light Racing	07	Spencer Pumpelly 1	Mike Hillman Sr. 19; Daniel Johnson 10; Jason Miller 3 Teddy Brown 1
Chevrolet 31 Ford 2	SS-Green Light Racing	07	Mason Maggio 1	Mike Hillman Sr. 19; Daniel Johnson 10; Jason Miller 3 Teddy Brown 1
Chevrolet 31 Ford 2	SS-Green Light Racing	07	Katherine Legge 1	Mike Hillman Sr. 19; Daniel Johnson 10; Jason Miller 3 Teddy Brown 1
Chevrolet 31 Ford 2	SS-Green Light Racing	07	Colin Garrett 1	Mike Hillman Sr. 19; Daniel Johnson 10; Jason Miller 3 Teddy Brown 1
Chevrolet 31 Ford 2	SS-Green Light Racing	07	Josh Bilicki 2	Mike Hillman Sr. 19; Daniel Johnson 10; Jason Miller 3 Teddy Brown 1
Chevrolet 31 Ford 2	SS-Green Light Racing	07	J. J. Yeley 1	Mike Hillman Sr. 19; Daniel Johnson 10; Jason Miller 3 Teddy Brown 1
Chevrolet 31 Ford 2	SS-Green Light Racing	07	Gray Gaulding 1	Mike Hillman Sr. 19; Daniel Johnson 10; Jason Miller 3 Teddy Brown 1
Chevrolet 31 Ford 2	SS-Green Light Racing	07	Natalie Decker 1	Mike Hillman Sr. 19; Daniel Johnson 10; Jason Miller 3 Teddy Brown 1
Chevrolet 31 Ford 2	SS-Green Light Racing	07	Devin Jones 1	Mike Hillman Sr. 19; Daniel Johnson 10; Jason Miller 3 Teddy Brown 1
Chevrolet 9 Ford 24	SS-Green Light Racing	08	Gray Gaulding 11	Jason Miller 30; Daniel Johnson 3
Chevrolet 9 Ford 24	SS-Green Light Racing	08	Aric Almirola 1	Jason Miller 30; Daniel Johnson 3
Chevrolet 9 Ford 24	SS-Green Light Racing	08	Natalie Decker 1	Jason Miller 30; Daniel Johnson 3
Chevrolet 9 Ford 24	SS-Green Light Racing	08	Preston Pardus 1	Jason Miller 30; Daniel Johnson 3
Chevrolet 9 Ford 24	SS-Green Light Racing	08	Kyle Weatherman 1	Jason Miller 30; Daniel Johnson 3
Chevrolet 9 Ford 24	SS-Green Light Racing	08	Mason Massey 5	Jason Miller 30; Daniel Johnson 3
Chevrolet 9 Ford 24	SS-Green Light Racing	08	Joey Gase 1	Jason Miller 30; Daniel Johnson 3
Chevrolet 9 Ford 24	SS-Green Light Racing	08	Alex Labbé 3 (Note: Stefan Parsons replaced Alex Labbé in the No. 08 car in practice for the race at Road America (race #20). A reason has not been given.)	Jason Miller 30; Daniel Johnson 3
Chevrolet 9 Ford 24	SS-Green Light Racing	08	Mason Maggio 1	Jason Miller 30; Daniel Johnson 3
Chevrolet 9 Ford 24	SS-Green Light Racing	08	Camden Murphy 1	Jason Miller 30; Daniel Johnson 3
Chevrolet 9 Ford 24	SS-Green Light Racing	08	Chad Finchum 3	Jason Miller 30; Daniel Johnson 3
Chevrolet 9 Ford 24	SS-Green Light Racing	08	J. J. Yeley 2	Jason Miller 30; Daniel Johnson 3
Chevrolet 9 Ford 24	SS-Green Light Racing	08	Stefan Parsons 2	Jason Miller 30; Daniel Johnson 3
Ford 6 Toyota 15 Chevrolet 12	Emerling-Gase Motorsports	35	C. J. McLaughlin 1	Paul Clapprood 22; Rick Bourgeois 1 Wayne Carroll Jr. 10
Ford 6 Toyota 15 Chevrolet 12	Emerling-Gase Motorsports	35	Joey Gase 11	Paul Clapprood 22; Rick Bourgeois 1 Wayne Carroll Jr. 10
Ford 6 Toyota 15 Chevrolet 12	Emerling-Gase Motorsports	35	Patrick Emerling 10 (Note: At Bristol (race #27), Patrick Emerling drove the No. 35 Chevrolet in practice and during it, he crashed. Since the team did not have a backup car and the No. 35 was higher in the owner points standings than the No. 53, the team withdrew the No. 53 Chevrolet driven by B. J. McLeod and renumbered that car as the No. 35 for the race and McLeod drove the No. 35 car in the race replacing Emerling.)	Paul Clapprood 22; Rick Bourgeois 1 Wayne Carroll Jr. 10
Ford 6 Toyota 15 Chevrolet 12	Emerling-Gase Motorsports	35	Parker Chase 2	Paul Clapprood 22; Rick Bourgeois 1 Wayne Carroll Jr. 10
Ford 6 Toyota 15 Chevrolet 12	Emerling-Gase Motorsports	35	Leland Honeyman 1	Paul Clapprood 22; Rick Bourgeois 1 Wayne Carroll Jr. 10
Ford 6 Toyota 15 Chevrolet 12	Emerling-Gase Motorsports	35	David Starr 2	Paul Clapprood 22; Rick Bourgeois 1 Wayne Carroll Jr. 10
Ford 6 Toyota 15 Chevrolet 12	Emerling-Gase Motorsports	35	Alex Labbé 2	Paul Clapprood 22; Rick Bourgeois 1 Wayne Carroll Jr. 10
Ford 6 Toyota 15 Chevrolet 12	Emerling-Gase Motorsports	35	Stanton Barrett 2	Paul Clapprood 22; Rick Bourgeois 1 Wayne Carroll Jr. 10
Ford 6 Toyota 15 Chevrolet 12	Emerling-Gase Motorsports	35	B. J. McLeod 1	Paul Clapprood 22; Rick Bourgeois 1 Wayne Carroll Jr. 10
Ford 6 Toyota 15 Chevrolet 12	Emerling-Gase Motorsports	35	Alex Guenette 1	Paul Clapprood 22; Rick Bourgeois 1 Wayne Carroll Jr. 10
Ford 6 Toyota 15 Chevrolet 12	Emerling-Gase Motorsports	35	Chris Hacker 1	Paul Clapprood 22; Rick Bourgeois 1 Wayne Carroll Jr. 10
Ford 10 (Note: At Las Vegas in March (race #3), C. J. McLaughlin drove the No. 53 Chevrolet in practice and during it, he crashed and was injured. As a result, he was replaced by Patrick Emerling. Additionally, the team did not have a backup car and used a Ford from MBM Motorsports after their car (No. 66) did not made the field.) (Note: At Nashville (race #15), C. J. McLaughlin drove the No. 53 Toyota in practice and during it, he crashed and was injured. As a result, he was replaced by Joey Gase. Additionally, the team's backup car was a Ford.) Chevrolet 21 Toyota 4	Emerling-Gase Motorsports	53	Joey Gase 3	Rick Bourgeois 8 Paul Clapprood 11; Wayne Carroll Jr. 14
Ford 10 Chevrolet 21 Toyota 4	Emerling-Gase Motorsports	53	C. J. McLaughlin 8	Rick Bourgeois 8 Paul Clapprood 11; Wayne Carroll Jr. 14
Ford 10 Chevrolet 21 Toyota 4	Emerling-Gase Motorsports	53	Patrick Emerling 9	Rick Bourgeois 8 Paul Clapprood 11; Wayne Carroll Jr. 14
Ford 10 Chevrolet 21 Toyota 4	Emerling-Gase Motorsports	53	Brad Perez 4	Rick Bourgeois 8 Paul Clapprood 11; Wayne Carroll Jr. 14
Ford 10 Chevrolet 21 Toyota 4	Emerling-Gase Motorsports	53	Matt Mills 5	Rick Bourgeois 8 Paul Clapprood 11; Wayne Carroll Jr. 14
Ford 10 Chevrolet 21 Toyota 4	Emerling-Gase Motorsports	53	Akinori Ogata 2	Rick Bourgeois 8 Paul Clapprood 11; Wayne Carroll Jr. 14
Ford 10 Chevrolet 21 Toyota 4	Emerling-Gase Motorsports	53	Natalie Decker 1	Rick Bourgeois 8 Paul Clapprood 11; Wayne Carroll Jr. 14
Ford 10 Chevrolet 21 Toyota 4	Emerling-Gase Motorsports	53	B. J. McLeod 1	Rick Bourgeois 8 Paul Clapprood 11; Wayne Carroll Jr. 14
Ford 10 Chevrolet 21 Toyota 4	Emerling-Gase Motorsports	53	Conor Daly 1	Rick Bourgeois 8 Paul Clapprood 11; Wayne Carroll Jr. 14
Ford 10 Chevrolet 21 Toyota 4	Emerling-Gase Motorsports	53	Chris Hacker 1	Rick Bourgeois 8 Paul Clapprood 11; Wayne Carroll Jr. 14

=== Limited schedule ===
Manufacturer	Team	No.	Race driver	Crew chief	Rounds
Chevrolet	Big Machine Racing	5	Jade Buford	Chris Carrier	2
Chevrolet	B. J. McLeod Motorsports	99	Garrett Smithley	Lee Leslie	3
Chevrolet	CHK Racing	74	Ryan Vargas	Ryan Bell 17; Mike Harmon 5	3
Chevrolet	CHK Racing	74	Dawson Cram	Ryan Bell 17; Mike Harmon 5	13
Chevrolet	CHK Racing	74	Baltazar Leguizamón	Ryan Bell 17; Mike Harmon 5	1
Chevrolet	CHK Racing	74	Kaden Honeycutt	Ryan Bell 17; Mike Harmon 5	1
Chevrolet	CHK Racing	74	Mike Harmon	Ryan Bell 17; Mike Harmon 5	1
Chevrolet	CHK Racing	74	Casey Carden	Ryan Bell 17; Mike Harmon 5	1
Chevrolet	CHK Racing	74	Devin Jones	Ryan Bell 17; Mike Harmon 5	1
Chevrolet	CHK Racing	74	Brad Perez	Ryan Bell 17; Mike Harmon 5	1
Chevrolet	DGM Racing	36	Alex Labbé	Nathan Kennedy 2 Dexter Bean 1 B. J. Tucker 1 George Church 1	1
Chevrolet	DGM Racing	36	Josh Bilicki	Nathan Kennedy 2 Dexter Bean 1 B. J. Tucker 1 George Church 1	2
Chevrolet	DGM Racing	36	Alex Guenette	Nathan Kennedy 2 Dexter Bean 1 B. J. Tucker 1 George Church 1	1
Chevrolet	DGM Racing	36	Kyle Weatherman	Nathan Kennedy 2 Dexter Bean 1 B. J. Tucker 1 George Church 1	1
Chevrolet	FRS Racing	96	Kyle Weatherman	Matt Weber 2 Andrew Abbott 1	2
Chevrolet	FRS Racing	96	Max McLaughlin	Matt Weber 2 Andrew Abbott 1	1
Chevrolet	Hendrick Motorsports	17	William Byron	Greg Ives 6 Kevin Meendering 1	1
Chevrolet	Hendrick Motorsports	17	Kyle Larson	Greg Ives 6 Kevin Meendering 1	2
Chevrolet	Hendrick Motorsports	17	Chase Elliott	Greg Ives 6 Kevin Meendering 1	1
Chevrolet	Hendrick Motorsports	17	Alex Bowman	Greg Ives 6 Kevin Meendering 1	1
Chevrolet	Hendrick Motorsports	17	Boris Said	Greg Ives 6 Kevin Meendering 1	1
Chevrolet	Hendrick Motorsports	17	Rajah Caruth	Greg Ives 6 Kevin Meendering 1	1
Chevrolet	Jesse Iwuji Motorsports	34	Jesse Iwuji	Dan Stillman 1 Todd Parrott 1	2
Chevrolet	Jesse Iwuji Motorsports	34	Andre Castro	Andrew Abbott	2
Chevrolet	Jordan Anderson Racing	22	Jeb Burton	Shane Whitbeck	1
Chevrolet	JR Motorsports	88	Miguel Paludo	Jason Stockert	3
Chevrolet	JR Motorsports	88	Dale Earnhardt Jr.	Jason Stockert	2
Chevrolet	Pardus Racing Inc.	50	Preston Pardus	Dan Pardus	4
Chevrolet	Peterson Racing Group	87	Andy Lally	Christopher Measamer	1
Chevrolet	Richard Childress Racing	3	Ty Dillon	Mike Wolf	2
Chevrolet	Spire Motorsports	77	Carson Hocevar	Kevin Manion	4
Ford	RSS Racing	29	Alex Labbé	Teddy Brown 5 Steve Addington 1 Mike Scearce 1	1
Ford	RSS Racing	29	Kyle Sieg	Teddy Brown 5 Steve Addington 1 Mike Scearce 1	5
Ford	RSS Racing	29	Mason Maggio	Teddy Brown 5 Steve Addington 1 Mike Scearce 1	1
Toyota 1 Ford 1	MBM Motorsports	13	Timmy Hill	Gio Liberati	1
Toyota 1 Ford 1	MBM Motorsports	13	Jason White	Lee Leslie	1
Chevrolet 4 Ford 16 Toyota 10	MBM Motorsports	66	Dexter Stacey	Jason Houghtaling 10; Chris Atteberry 2 Lee Leslie 2 Carl Long 15; Michael Brandt 1	4
Chevrolet 4 Ford 16 Toyota 10	MBM Motorsports	66	Timmy Hill	Jason Houghtaling 10; Chris Atteberry 2 Lee Leslie 2 Carl Long 15; Michael Brandt 1	10 (Note: At Phoenix in March (race #4), Brian Weber drove the No. 66 in practice but he was replaced by Timmy Hill for qualifying.) (Note: At Kansas in September (race #26), Timmy Hill qualified the No. 66 car but after Honeyman failed to qualify for the race in his own No. 44 car, he replaced Timmy Hill in the No. 66.)
Chevrolet 4 Ford 16 Toyota 10	MBM Motorsports	66	Mason Maggio	Jason Houghtaling 10; Chris Atteberry 2 Lee Leslie 2 Carl Long 15; Michael Brandt 1	3
Chevrolet 4 Ford 16 Toyota 10	MBM Motorsports	66	Brian Weber	Jason Houghtaling 10; Chris Atteberry 2 Lee Leslie 2 Carl Long 15; Michael Brandt 1	1
Chevrolet 4 Ford 16 Toyota 10	MBM Motorsports	66	Caesar Bacarella	Jason Houghtaling 10; Chris Atteberry 2 Lee Leslie 2 Carl Long 15; Michael Brandt 1	1 (Note: Entries were fielded in a collaboration with Alpha Prime Racing.)
Chevrolet 4 Ford 16 Toyota 10	MBM Motorsports	66	Cameron Lawrence	Jason Houghtaling 10; Chris Atteberry 2 Lee Leslie 2 Carl Long 15; Michael Brandt 1	1
Chevrolet 4 Ford 16 Toyota 10	MBM Motorsports	66	Chad Finchum	Jason Houghtaling 10; Chris Atteberry 2 Lee Leslie 2 Carl Long 15; Michael Brandt 1	4
Chevrolet 4 Ford 16 Toyota 10	MBM Motorsports	66	Mason Filippi	Jason Houghtaling 10; Chris Atteberry 2 Lee Leslie 2 Carl Long 15; Michael Brandt 1	1
Chevrolet 4 Ford 16 Toyota 10	MBM Motorsports	66	Sage Karam	Jason Houghtaling 10; Chris Atteberry 2 Lee Leslie 2 Carl Long 15; Michael Brandt 1	3
Chevrolet 4 Ford 16 Toyota 10	MBM Motorsports	66	Will Rodgers	Jason Houghtaling 10; Chris Atteberry 2 Lee Leslie 2 Carl Long 15; Michael Brandt 1	1
Chevrolet 4 Ford 16 Toyota 10	MBM Motorsports	66	Leland Honeyman	Jason Houghtaling 10; Chris Atteberry 2 Lee Leslie 2 Carl Long 15; Michael Brandt 1	1
Chevrolet 4 Ford 16 Toyota 10	MBM Motorsports	66	Ryan Reed	Jason Houghtaling 10; Chris Atteberry 2 Lee Leslie 2 Carl Long 15; Michael Brandt 1	1
Chevrolet 4 Ford 16 Toyota 10	MBM Motorsports	66	Ryan Newman	Jason Houghtaling 10; Chris Atteberry 2 Lee Leslie 2 Carl Long 15; Michael Brandt 1	1

=== Changes ===
==== Teams ====
- On July 14, 2022, Emerling-Gase Motorsports announced that they would expand to two full-time cars, with the No. 53, previously a part-time car, running full-time in 2023. One car would have one full-time driver with multiple drivers sharing the other car. On February 2, 2023, the team announced that the No. 53 car would be driven by team co-owners Joey Gase and Patrick Emerling (as well as previously announced part-time drivers Brad Perez and C. J. McLaughlin), making the No. 35 car the car that will have one full-time driver.
- On August 25, 2022, Front Row Motorsports announced that Zane Smith, who drives for the team full-time in the Truck Series, would run part-time for a Ford team in the Xfinity Series with entries being fielded in a collaboration with them (instead of FRM starting their own Xfinity Series team).
- On September 20, 2022, JD Motorsports announced that they would expand to three full-time Xfinity Series cars in 2023. The team downsized from four full-time cars to two in 2022. However, on February 9, 2023, the team revealed to TobyChristie.com that they would only field the No. 0 car part-time in 2023 due to lack of sponsorship.
- On October 7, 2022, it was announced that Truck and ARCA Series team AM Racing, owned by driver Austin Wayne Self, would expand into the Xfinity Series in 2023 and attempt to qualify for the season-opener at Daytona. On December 12, it was announced that AMR would field their new Xfinity Series car, the No. 25, full-time in 2023 and Brett Moffitt, who previously drove part-time for the team in the Truck Series, would drive it.
- On October 26, 2022, Jesse Iwuji stated in an interview with Dustin Albino from Jayski that he would like to expand his team to two full-time cars in 2023 if sponsorship can be found for a second car. However, on February 17, 2023, Kyle Weatherman, who drove for the team in 2023, revealed to TobyChristie.com that JIM would not field a second car and would also be cutting back their one car, the No. 34, to part-time in 2023 amidst the team's sponsorship struggles following the loss of the No. 34 car's primary sponsor, Equity Prime Mortgage, in a lawsuit and legal battle.
- On November 5, 2022, Mike Harmon Racing announced that Gary Keller would join the team as a co-owner after having been a co-owner of JD Motorsports from 2012 to 2022. The team will be back in the Xfinity Series in 2023 although they have yet to announce their 2023 plans. On December 19, Brandon Kauffman, the team's PR & Marketing Assistant, teased on the NASCAR Reddit page that the team would field the No. 74 car again in 2023. In 2022, MHR only fielded that car in the season-opener at Daytona when it had run full-time for several years prior. On January 13, 2023, the team announced that they would be renaming to CHK Racing after the addition of another co-owner, Michael Clayton Sr, as well as to reflect Keller's new co-ownership of the team. The No. 74 car will be fielded full-time while the No. 47 car will be fielded part-time.
- On November 16, 2022, Stewart–Haas Racing announced that they would be expanding to two full-time Xfinity Series cars in 2023. The second car will be driven by Cole Custer, who is moving back to the Xfinity Series after three years driving the team's No. 41 Cup Series car. On November 23, it was revealed that Custer would drive the No. 00, the same car number SHR used when they last fielded a second Xfinity Series car and Custer was the driver.
- On December 8, 2022, Joe Gibbs Racing announced that their No. 54 car would be renumbered to the No. 20 in 2023. JGR did not use that number in 2022 after downsizing from four full-time Xfinity Series cars to three and the No. 20 car was the car that closed down.
- On December 8, 2022, Sam Hunt Racing announced that they would expand to two full-time cars in 2023, with their No. 24 car now being fielded full-time after having been fielded part-time in 2021 and 2022.
- On December 20, 2022, Alpha Prime Racing announced that they would expand to three full-time cars in 2023. Their new third car, the No. 43, will be driven by Ryan Ellis in 24 races with the driver(s) for the remaining 9 races to be announced at a later time. On March 13, 2023, it was revealed on the entry list for the race at Atlanta that APR would field a fourth car, the No. 42, in that race to be driven by team owner Caesar Bacarella. However, the car would be withdrawn and Bacarella would instead replace Timmy Hill in the No. 66 car for MBM Motorsports with the entry being fielded in a collaboration with APR.
- On January 4, 2023, Jordan Anderson Racing announced that they would expand to two full-time cars in 2023. The second car will be the No. 27 driven by Jeb Burton. He used the same number in 2022 driving full-time for Our Motorsports.
- On February 18, 2023, MBM Motorsports announced that they would scale back to one full-time team, with the No. 66 remaining as the full-time entry with the No. 13 car being fielded part-time starting at Daytona. On July 7, MBM announced that they would withdraw the No. 66 car from the race at Atlanta and begin running part-time for the rest of the year in the Xfinity Series and start running part-time in the Cup Series (where there were spots in race fields for open cars that were not filled) after the car failed to qualify for over half of this year's Xfinity Series races.
- On March 3, 2023, Preston Pardus announced that he would return to driving for his own team in the Xfinity Series, which he last did in 2019. That year, the team used the No. 43, which is now taken by Alpha Prime Racing, so the team switched to the No. 50, a number that Pardus' father Dan used in the Cup Series in 1999 driving for Midwest Transit Racing. The first Xfinity Series race Preston and his team ran in 2023 was Circuit of the Americas.
- On March 7, 2023, Cup and Truck Series team Spire Motorsports announced that they would expand into the Xfinity Series in 2023, fielding the No. 77 car part-time for Carson Hocevar, who drives full-time in the Truck Series for Niece Motorsports. This made Spire the only team to field entries in all three NASCAR national series in 2023.
- On October 2, 2023, when the entry list was released for the race at the Charlotte Roval, it was revealed that Peterson Racing Group, a Trans-Am Series team, would make their NASCAR debut and field a No. 87 car in that race driven by Andy Lally.

==== Drivers ====
- On August 10, 2022, it was announced that Noah Gragson, who drove the JR Motorsports No. 9 car full-time for four years from 2019 to 2022, would move up to the Cup Series full-time in 2023, driving the Petty GMS Motorsports No. 42. On September 15, JRM announced that Brandon Jones would leave Joe Gibbs Racing and move to JRM to replace Gragson in the No. 9 car.
- On September 26, 2022, NASCAR YouTuber Casey Campbell revealed that Brandon Brown told him that he would not return to his family-owned team Brandonbilt Motorsports in their No. 68 car in 2023.
- On October 5, 2022, Kaulig Racing announced that Chandler Smith, who has driven full-time in the Truck Series in the No. 18 for Kyle Busch Motorsports for the last two years, would replace A. J. Allmendinger in the No. 16 in 2023, as Allmendinger would return to the Cup Series to drive the team's No. 16 car full-time.
- On October 28, 2022, Jeb Burton announced he would be leaving Our Motorsports at the end of the 2022 season.
- On October 29, 2022, Big Machine Racing announced that Parker Kligerman, a NASCAR on NBC pit reporter and part-time driver, would drive their No. 48 car full-time in 2023. It will be Kligerman's first full-time season since 2013.
- On October 30, 2022, Corazón de F1 reported that open wheel driver Baltazar Leguizamón had obtained a license to drive in the Xfinity Series and he could attempt some of the road course races in 2023. He would become the first driver from Argentina to compete in the series. On December 23, MBM Motorsports announced that Leguizamón would drive for the team in the race at Circuit of the Americas in 2023 once they find a sponsor for him. On March 20, 2023, MBM announced that Cameron Lawrence would drive their No. 66 car at COTA instead of Leguizamón as they could not find a sponsor for him for that race. However, the team stated that he could run another race for the team later in the year if a sponsor is found. Later in the day, CHK Racing announced that Leguizamón would make his Xfinity Series debut at COTA driving their No. 74 car instead of for MBM.
- On October 31, 2022, Ryan Vargas announced that he would not return to JD Motorsports in 2023. He drove the team's No. 6 for the majority of the 2021 and 2022 seasons. On December 2, JDM announced Brennan Poole as Vargas' replacement in the No. 6.
- On November 1, 2022, B. J. McLeod Motorsports announced that Garrett Smithley would drive the team's No. 78 car full-time in 2023. He drove that car as well as the team's No. 5 car part-time in the Xfinity Series in 2022. On January 7, 2023, the team announced that the car would be renumbered from the No. 78 to the No. 99. After Smithley and the No. 99 car failed to qualify for two of the first three races of the season, the car was withdrawn from the race at Phoenix in March and Smithley instead drove the No. 91 car for DGM Racing in that race. On March 13, 2023, an article on TobyChristie.com stated that Bayley Currey would be replaced in the JD Motorsports No. 4 car starting at Atlanta in March by Garrett Smithley for 14 races and other driver(s) for the remaining 15 races according to a crew member from the team who requested anonymity. Another anonymous crew member told the website that Smithley would run the remainder of the season in the No. 4 car. The next day, JDM officially announced that Smithley would drive the No. 4 car for the rest of the year, replacing Currey. He previously drove full-time for the team from 2016 to 2019, primarily in their No. 0 car.
- On November 15, 2022, Joe Gibbs Racing announced that Ty Gibbs would move up to the Cup Series full-time for the team in 2023, replacing Kyle Busch in the renumbered No. 54 car (previously the No. 18). On December 8, JGR announced that John Hunter Nemechek would drive the renumbered No. 20 full-time in 2023. In 2021 and 2022, Nemechek drove full-time for Kyle Busch Motorsports in the Truck Series and part-time for JGR in the Xfinity Series.
- On November 16, 2022, Stewart–Haas Racing announced that Cole Custer will move back to the Xfinity Series after three seasons in the Cup Series. He will drive a second full-time Xfinity Series car for the team. On November 23, SHR posted a video on their Twitter account revealing that Custer would drive the No. 00, the same number he used when he ran full-time in the Xfinity Series for the team from 2017 to 2019.
- On December 8, 2022, Joe Gibbs Racing announced that their No. 19 car, previously driven full-time by Brandon Jones (who left to drive the JRM No. 9 car), would have multiple drivers sharing the car throughout the season instead of the No. 18 car, which will now be driven full-time by Sammy Smith. Ryan Truex, who was one of the drivers of the No. 18 in 2022, will continue driving part-time for JGR in 2023 in the No. 19 car. The rest of the driver lineup for the No. 19 car has yet to be announced.
- On December 8, 2022, Sam Hunt Racing announced that Kaz Grala would drive their No. 26 car full-time in 2023. It is the first time that car has had one driver for the full season as well as Grala's first full-time ride in NASCAR since 2017 when he drove for GMS Racing in the Truck Series. Grala drove the same car in the 2022 season-finale at Phoenix after driving for multiple other teams part-time in 2022 in the Cup, Xfinity and Truck Series.
- On December 8, 2022, Sam Hunt Racing announced that Connor Mosack would drive their No. 24 car part-time in 2023. In 2022, he drove one race for the team in their No. 26 car at Watkins Glen as well as Joe Gibbs Racing's No. 18 car at Portland. Mosack also drove part-time for Bret Holmes Racing in the Truck and ARCA Series in 2022. On January 23, 2023, SHR announced that Tyler Reddick would drive the No. 24 in select races starting with Fontana.
- On December 12, 2022, AM Racing announced that Brett Moffitt would drive the No. 25 in 2023.
- On December 13, 2022, Alpha Prime Racing announced that Jeffrey Earnhardt would drive their No. 44 car full-time in 2023. He drove part-time for Sam Hunt Racing, Emerling-Gase Motorsports and Richard Childress Racing in 2022.
- On December 23, 2022, SS-Green Light Racing owner Bobby Dotter stated in a video on the team's Twitter account that Joe Graf Jr. would not be back with SSGLR in 2023 and that the team will have new drivers for their cars in 2023. On January 9, 2023, the team announced that Blaine Perkins, who drove full-time for CR7 Motorsports full-time in the Truck Series in 2022 and for Our Motorsports part-time in the Xfinity Series in 2021 and 2022, would drive their No. 07 car full-time in 2023. On March 21, 2023, the team announced that they had parted ways with Perkins after a poor start to the season. Multiple drivers will drive the No. 07 car for the rest of the year starting with full-time Niece Motorsports Truck Series driver Carson Hocevar making his Xfinity Series debut at COTA.
- On December 30, 2022, Alpha Prime Racing announced that Leland Honeyman would drive their No. 45 car part-time in 2023. He drove for Young's Motorsports full-time in the ARCA Menards Series East and part-time in the main ARCA Series and the Truck Series in 2022.
- On January 4, 2023, Jordan Anderson Racing announced that they would have two new full-time drivers in 2023. Jeb Burton will drive the No. 27 car, a new second full-time car for the team, and Parker Retzlaff will replace Myatt Snider in their No. 31 car. On February 8, 2023, it was announced that Snider would drive the JGR No. 19 car part-time.
- On January 18, 2023, Landon Cassill tweeted that he would not be returning to the Kaulig Racing No. 10 car in 2023 as a result of his sponsor Voyager Digital filing for bankruptcy in July 2022. On February 9, A. J. Allmendinger announced he would drive the No. 10 at COTA. The next day, Kyle Busch announced he would drive the No. 10 for five races, ending his retirement in the Xfinity Series after scoring a total of 102 wins in 2021. As Allmendinger and Busch are full-time Cup drivers, they are allowed to run up to five races in the Xfinity Series.
- On January 27, 2023, it was announced that Joe Graf Jr. would drive at least 28 races for RSS Racing in 2023. He previously drove the majority of the 2022 season for SS-Green Light Racing as well as 1 race for RSS in their No. 38 car, replacing Timmy Hill in that car after he failed to qualify the SSGLR No. 08 into the race at Fontana. Graf Jr. will drive the other five races in the No. 19 Toyota Supra for Joe Gibbs Racing.
- On February 8, 2023, it was announced that Natalie Decker would drive part-time for Emerling-Gase Motorsports in the Xfinity Series and the ARCA Menards Series in their No. 53 car in both series.
- On February 18, 2023, Alex Labbé revealed that he would drive the No. 28 car for RSS Racing at Fontana and Las Vegas, filling in for Joe Graf Jr. who will drive the Joe Gibbs Racing No. 19 car in those two races. Kyle Sieg will move from the No. 28 car to replace Graf in the No. 38 car for these two races. It is the first time Labbé has driven for a team other than DGM Racing in the Xfinity Series.
- On February 24, 2023, it was announced that Mason Maggio would make his Xfinity Series debut in the race at Las Vegas in March driving the No. 66 car for MBM Motorsports. He ran part-time in the Truck Series for Reaume Brothers Racing and Peck Motorsports in 2022.
- On March 13, 2023, it was announced that Chad Chastain would make his Xfinity Series debut in the race at Atlanta in March driving the No. 91 car for DGM Racing. His brother Ross drove the same car at Fontana three weeks prior. Chad has driven part-time in the Truck Series for Niece Motorsports since 2021.
- On March 21, 2023, NASCAR announced that Josh Williams would be suspended for one race (COTA) after his actions at Atlanta where he parked his car in the middle of the track during a caution and walked away, leaving the car on the track after his frustration with NASCAR for parking him during the race for his car leaving multiple pieces of debris on the track. Later in the day, DGM Racing announced that Alex Labbé would fill in for Williams in their No. 92 car in the race at COTA.
- On April 22, 2023, Alpha Prime Racing announced that ARCA driver Greg Van Alst, who scored an upset win in the ARCA season-opener at Daytona earlier in the year, would make his Xfinity Series debut for the team in the race at Atlanta in July. On June 30, APR revealed that Van Alst would drive their No. 44 car in that race.
- On June 6, 2023, RSS Racing announced that Brent Sherman would drive their No. 28 car at the Chicago Street Course. It will be his first start in the Xfinity Series since 2007 when he ran nearly the full season driving the No. 36 car for the former McGill Motorsports team. He has not raced in NASCAR since running part-time in the Truck Series in 2009 and in ARCA in 2016.
- On June 22, 2023, JD Motorsports announced that Kyle Weatherman would drive their No. 4 car beginning at Nashville, replacing Garrett Smithley, and that he could run the rest of the year in that car. Weatherman would drive the No. 36 car for DGM Racing at Atlanta in July with Smithley returning to the JDM No. 4 in that race.
- On July 27, 2023, SS-Green Light Racing announced that Katherine Legge would drive their No. 07 car in the race at Road America as well as the other three remaining road course races (the Indianapolis road course, Watkins Glen and the Charlotte Roval). It is her first time competing in NASCAR and the Xfinity Series since 2018 when she ran the races at Mid-Ohio, Road America the Charlotte Roval as well as 1 oval race at Richmond in the JD Motorsports No. 15 car. On August 8, it was revealed that Colin Garrett would replace Legge in the No. 07 car in the race at the Indianapolis road course after Legge's sponsor, Blast Equality Collab, did not want to be on the car due to their members' connection with the writers' strike going on at the time.
- On August 15, 2023, CHK Racing announced that Casey Carden, who has driven part-time in the ARCA Menards Series for Clubb Racing Inc. in road course races, would attempt to make his Xfinity Series debut in the race at Watkins Glen in their No. 74 car.
- On August 17, 2023, NASCAR suspended Chris Hacker and Jason White indefinitely for violating Section 4.4. D. of the NASCAR Rule Book, stating actions detrimental to stock car racing - particularly on being charged with or convicted of significant criminal violations. Hacker was arrested on August 15 while White was arrested on August 3; both were charged with DWI. Hacker was reinstated on October 25 after completing the Road to Recovery program and would drive the Emerling-Gase Motorsports No. 35 car in the race at Martinsville the next weekend.
- On August 24, 2023, SS-Green Light Racing announced that Chad Finchum would drive their No. 08 car in the races at Darlington and Bristol in September and Martinsville in October. SSGLR is the first team that Finchum has driven for in the Xfinity Series other than MBM Motorsports.
- On September 6, 2023, Kaulig Racing announced that, due to the No. 10 Chevrolet being in the owners playoffs, Daniel Hemric would move from the No. 11 to the No. 10 starting at Kansas. Derek Kraus will drive the No. 11 in Kansas, Homestead, and Phoenix, while Layne Riggs will make his Xfinity Series debut in the car at Texas, Las Vegas, and Martinsville. On September 29, Kaulig announced that IMSA driver Jordan Taylor, who drove their No. 10 car in the race at Portland, would make another start for the team at the Charlotte Roval in the No. 11 car.
- On October 5, 2023, MBM Motorsports announced that Ryan Newman would drive their No. 66 car in the race at Homestead-Miami Speedway. It will be his first Xfinity Series start since 2012. On October 10, it was revealed through the entry list for the race at Las Vegas that Ryan Reed would drive the MBM No. 66 car in that race, marking his return to the series for the first time since losing his full-time ride with what is now RFK Racing when they closed down their Xfinity Series team after the 2018 season. Since then, Reed competed part-time in the Truck Series in 2019 and 2021. The announcement of Reed driving the No. 66 car at Las Vegas was made the next day and it was revealed that his entry would be fielded in a collaboration between MBM and Alpha Prime Racing.

==== Crew chiefs ====
- On September 1, 2022, JR Motorsports announced that Mike Bumgarner, who was the crew chief of the team's No. 8 car driven by Josh Berry in 2022, would be the team's new competition director. On November 17, JRM announced that Bumgarner would be replaced by Taylor Moyer, who crew chiefed the team's No. 1 car driven by Sam Mayer in 2022. Moyer previously crew chiefed the No. 8 car from 2019 to 2021.
- On October 8, 2022, NASCAR on NBC pit reporter Marty Snider stated during a caution during the 2022 race at the Charlotte Roval that Kevin Starland, the crew chief of Ryan Sieg's No. 39 car for RSS Racing, would retire after the 2022 season. On February 5, 2023, RSS announced that Mike Scearce would be the new crew chief of the No. 39 car in 2023.
- On October 25, 2022, it was announced that Luke Lambert, who was the crew chief of the JR Motorsports No. 9 car driven by Noah Gragson in 2022, would move with Gragson to the Petty GMS Motorsports No. 42 car in the Cup Series in 2023. On November 17, JRM announced that Lambert would be replaced by Jason Burdett, who crew chiefed the team's No. 7 car from 2015 to 2022, working with Regan Smith for the first year and Justin Allgaier for the other seven. The No. 9 car will now be driven by Brandon Jones.
- On November 15, 2022, Joe Gibbs Racing announced that Chris Gayle, who crew chiefed their No. 54 car in the Xfinity Series in 2021 and 2022, would move back up to the Cup Series full-time for the team in 2023, replacing Ben Beshore as the crew chief of the renumbered No. 54 car (previously the No. 18 driven by Kyle Busch) and continuing to work with Ty Gibbs. On December 8, JGR announced that Beshore would move down to the Xfinity Series, replacing Gayle as the crew chief of the team's renumbered No. 20 car, now driven by John Hunter Nemechek.
- On November 17, 2022, JR Motorsports announced that Jim Pohlman would be the new crew chief for Justin Allgaier's No. 7 car in 2023, replacing Jason Burdett, who moved to JRM's No. 9 car driven by Brandon Jones. In 2022, Pohlman was a mechanic and an interim crew chief for Richard Childress Racing in the Cup and Xfinity Series. He was also the crew chief for Allgaier when he won the 2008 ARCA Re/Max Series championship.
- On November 17, 2022, JR Motorsports announced that Mardy Lindley would be the new crew chief for Sam Mayer's No. 1 car in 2023, replacing Taylor Moyer, who moved to JRM's No. 8 car driven by Josh Berry. Lindley was the crew chief of the No. 51 Kyle Busch Motorsports truck in 2021 and 2022. Prior to that, he was the crew chief for Mayer in ARCA with GMS Racing. Lindley and Mayer won two consecutive East Series championships in 2019 and 2020.
- On December 6, 2022, it was announced that Chad Walter, who was the crew chief of the No. 27 Our Motorsports car driven by Jeb Burton in 2022, would be leaving for GMS Racing to crew chief the team's No. 24 truck driven by Rajah Caruth in the Truck Series in 2023. Walter is returning to GMS after having crew chiefed for the team in 2020 and 2021. His replacement as crew chief of the Our Motorsports No. 27 car has yet to be announced.
- On December 6, 2022, Joe Gibbs Racing announced that Jeff Meendering, who was the crew chief of their No. 19 car driven by Brandon Jones from 2019 to 2022, would be the crew chief for their No. 18 car in 2023, replacing Jason Ratcliff. On December 8, JGR announced that Ratcliff would crew chief the No. 19 car in 2023, switching cars with Meendering. Sammy Smith will drive the No. 18 car full-time in 2023 after he and other drivers shared that car part-time in 2022. The No. 19 car will be the JGR car that has multiple part-time drivers in 2023 and Ratcliff will continue to crew chief them.
- On December 8, 2022, Sam Hunt Racing announced that Kris Bowen, who was the crew chief of the No. 02 Our Motorsports car in 2022, would be the crew chief of their No. 24 car in 2023. The No. 24 was a part-time car in 2022 and will be a full-time car in 2023. Bowen's replacement as crew chief of the Our Motorsports No. 02 car has yet to be announced.
- On January 6, 2023, Stewart–Haas Racing announced that Jonathan Toney, a longtime engineer for the team dating back to when the team was Haas CNC Racing, would be the crew chief of their No. 00 driven by Cole Custer in 2023.
- On January 9, 2023, SS-Green Light Racing announced that Mike Hillman Sr. would be the crew chief of their No. 07 car in 2023, replacing Joe Williams Jr. Hillman Sr. started 2022 as the crew chief of the Rick Ware Racing No. 15 car in the Cup Series before leaving for David Gilliland Racing in the Truck Series, and then crew chiefing for Emerling-Gase Motorsports, DGM Racing and Bassett Racing in the Xfinity Series during parts of the season.
- On January 9, 2023, AM Racing announced that Joe Williams Jr. would be the crew chief of the No. 25 car driven by Brett Moffitt in 2023.
- On February 2, 2023, Big Machine Racing announced that Chris Carrier, who was previously the crew chief of the Henderson Motorsports No. 75 in the Truck Series, would crew chief their new part-time second car, the No. 5 driven by Jade Buford.
- On February 5, 2023, RSS Racing announced that Brad Parrott, who crew chiefed the No. 6 Rev Racing ARCA car driven by Rajah Caruth for part of 2022, would be the new crew chief of their No. 28, which returns to running full-time in 2023. Parrott previously crew chiefed in the Xfinity Series from 2002 to 2013 for Roush Racing, Chip Ganassi Racing, RAB Racing, Rusty Wallace Racing, JD Motorsports, MAKE Motorsports, Tommy Baldwin Racing and TeamSLR.
- On February 13, 2023, it was revealed when the entry list for the season-opener at Daytona was released that Michael Brandt, who was the crew chief of Alpha Prime Racing's No. 44 for the majority of 2022, would move over to the team's new No. 43 in 2023. Brandt is one of the youngest crew chiefs in NASCAR history at age 22. Michael Groves would become the new crew chief of the No. 44 car, replacing Brandt.
- Starting at Richmond in April, Dan Stillman became the crew chief of the Our Motorsports No. 02, replacing Teddy Brown. He started the season as the crew chief of the Jesse Iwuji Motorsports No. 34 car, which cut back to part-time in 2023 due to lack of sponsorship. Todd Parrott would replace Stillman as crew chief of the JIM No. 34 car at Talladega, the next race it attempted.
- Starting at Martinsville in April, Robert Goodman became the crew chief of the JD Motorsports No. 4, replacing Wayne Carroll Jr, who left for Emerling-Gase Motorsports to crew chief the team's No. 53 car, replacing Rick Bourgeois.
- On May 11, 2023, MBM Motorsports announced that Jason Houghtaling, the crew chief of their No. 66 car, left the team to take a job with another team (Jordan Anderson Racing as the car chief of their No. 31 according to TobyChristie.com). Chris Atteberry, who had been the fueler for the No. 66, was promoted to crew chief the car replacing Houghtaling starting at Darlington.
- On June 20, 2023, Stewart–Haas Racing announced that Richard Boswell, crew chief of the No. 98 driven by Riley Herbst, would be promoted to the Cup Series to replace Johnny Klausmeier as the crew chief of the No. 14 driven by Chase Briscoe starting at Nashville. Replacing Boswell is Davin Restivo, who previously served as the lead engineer of the Cup Series No. 10 driven by Aric Almirola.

==== Interim crew chiefs ====
- On March 25, 2023, Mardy Lindley, crew chief of the JR Motorsports No. 1 car driven by Sam Mayer, got sick on the day of the race at COTA. Andrew Overstreet, the team's engineer, filled in as interim crew chief. Overstreet also filled in for Mayer's 2022 crew chief, Taylor Moyer, when he was suspended for four races.
- On September 12, 2023, Jeff Stankiewicz, crew chief of the Richard Childress Racing No. 2 car driven by Sheldon Creed, was suspended for the Bristol playoff race and fined US$10,000 after the car was found to have two loose lug nuts following the Kansas race. Sam Bowers, the team's engineer, filled in as interim crew chief.

==== Manufacturers ====
- On December 12, 2022, AM Racing announced it would switch from Chevrolet to Ford in 2023, with a technical alliance with Stewart–Haas Racing.
- On January 9, 2023, SS-Green Light Racing announced that they would be switching from Ford with a Stewart–Haas Racing alliance to Chevrolet with a Richard Childress Racing alliance for 2023. However, team owner Bobby Dotter told Jayski that the team's No. 08 may run a mixture of Chevrolets and Fords in 2023.

== Schedule ==
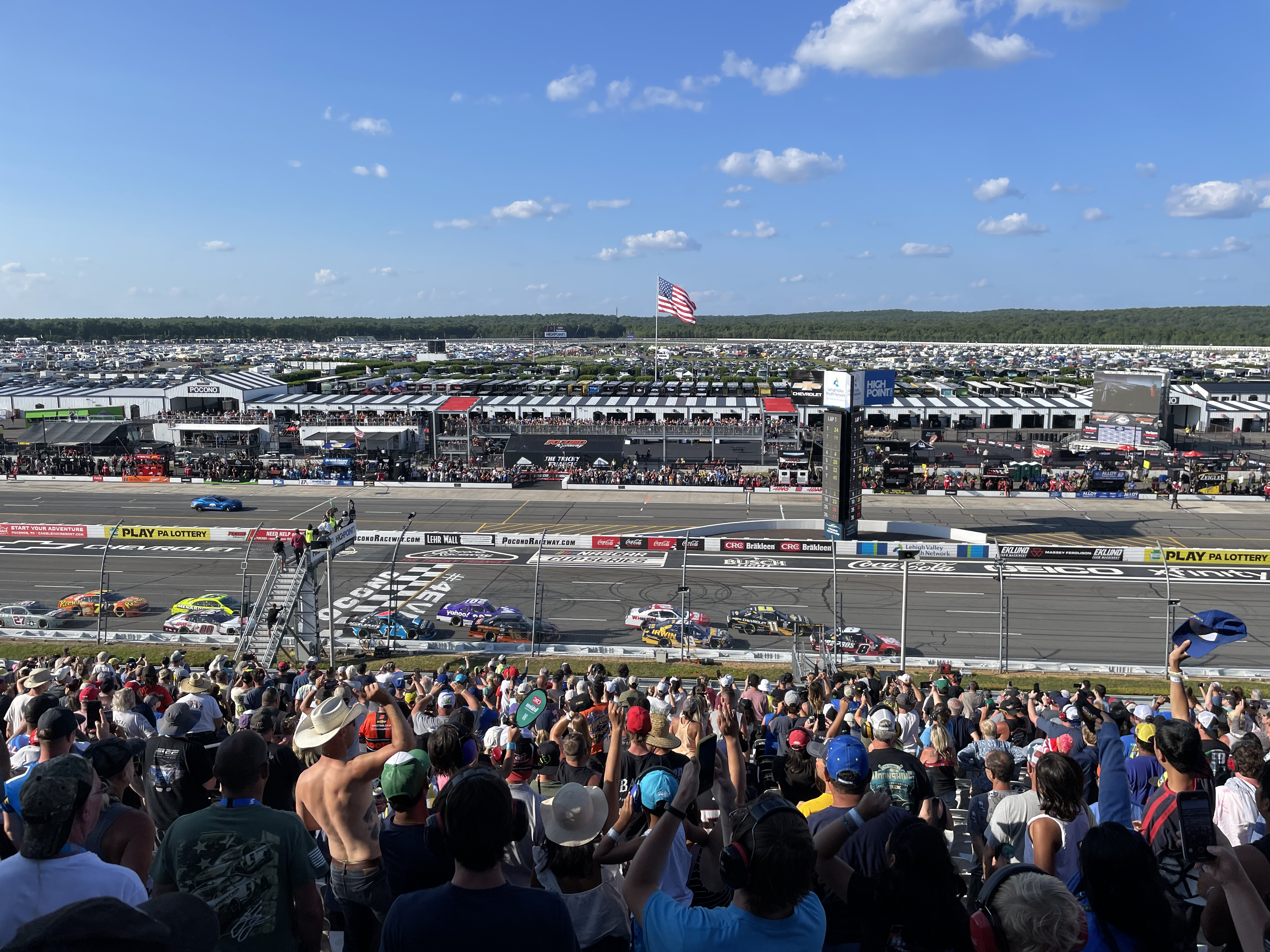
The Explore the Pocono Mountains 225 at Pocono Raceway in July.

The entire schedule was released on September 14, 2022.

- The Dash 4 Cash races (the spring races at Richmond, Martinsville, Talladega and Dover) are listed in **bold**.

No	Race title	Track	Location	Date
1	Beef. It's What's for Dinner. 300	O Daytona International Speedway	Daytona Beach, Florida	February 18
2	Production Alliance Group 300	O Auto Club Speedway	Fontana, California	February 25
3	Alsco Uniforms 300	O Las Vegas Motor Speedway	Las Vegas, Nevada	March 4
4	United Rentals 200	O Phoenix Raceway	Avondale, Arizona	March 11
5	RAPTOR King of Tough 250	O Atlanta Motor Speedway	Hampton, Georgia	March 18
6	Pit Boss 250	R Circuit of the Americas	Austin, Texas	March 25
7	**ToyotaCare 250**	O Richmond Raceway	Richmond, Virginia	April 1
8	**Call 811.com Before You Dig 250**	O Martinsville Speedway	Ridgeway, Virginia	April 15
9	**Ag-Pro 300**	O Talladega Superspeedway	Lincoln, Alabama	April 22
10	**A-GAME 200**	O Dover Motor Speedway	Dover, Delaware	April 29
11	Shriners Children's 200	O Darlington Raceway	Darlington, South Carolina	May 13
12	Alsco Uniforms 300	O Charlotte Motor Speedway	Concord, North Carolina	May 29 (Note: The Alsco Uniforms 300 was postponed from Saturday, May 27 to Monday, May 29 due to rain.)
13	Pacific Office Automation 147	R Portland International Raceway	Portland, Oregon	June 3
14	DoorDash 250	R Sonoma Raceway	Sonoma, California	June 10
15	Tennessee Lottery 250	O Nashville Superspeedway	Lebanon, Tennessee	June 24
16	The Loop 121	S Chicago Street Course	Chicago, Illinois	July 1–2 (Note: The Loop 121 started on Saturday, July 1 but was stopped during Stage 2 due to lightning delays. The race resumed on Sunday, July 2. The race was then called before halfway due to flooding along with the upcoming Cup race on the same day.)
17	Alsco Uniforms 250	O Atlanta Motor Speedway	Hampton, Georgia	July 8
18	Ambetter Health 200	O New Hampshire Motor Speedway	Loudon, New Hampshire	July 15
19	Explore the Pocono Mountains 225	O Pocono Raceway	Long Pond, Pennsylvania	July 22
20	Road America 180	R Road America	Elkhart Lake, Wisconsin	July 29
21	Cabo Wabo 250	O Michigan International Speedway	Brooklyn, Michigan	August 5
22	Pennzoil 150	R Indianapolis Motor Speedway (Road Course)	Speedway, Indiana	August 12
23	Shriners Children's 200 at The Glen	R Watkins Glen International	Watkins Glen, New York	August 19
24	Wawa 250	O Daytona International Speedway	Daytona Beach, Florida	August 25
25	Sport Clips Haircuts VFW 200	O Darlington Raceway	Darlington, South Carolina	September 2
26	Kansas Lottery 300	O Kansas Speedway	Kansas City, Kansas	September 9
NASCAR Xfinity Series Playoffs
Round of 12
27	Food City 300	O Bristol Motor Speedway	Bristol, Tennessee	September 15
28	Andy's Frozen Custard 300	O Texas Motor Speedway	Fort Worth, Texas	September 23
29	Drive for the Cure 250	R Charlotte Motor Speedway (Roval)	Concord, North Carolina	October 7
Round of 8
30	Alsco Uniforms 302	O Las Vegas Motor Speedway	Las Vegas, Nevada	October 14
31	Contender Boats 300	O Homestead-Miami Speedway	Homestead, Florida	October 21
32	Dead On Tools 250	O Martinsville Speedway	Ridgeway, Virginia	October 28
Championship 4
33	NASCAR Xfinity Series Championship Race	O Phoenix Raceway	Avondale, Arizona	November 4

=== Notes ===
O Oval track
R Road course
S Street course

== Results and standings ==
=== Race results ===
No.	Race	Pole position	Most laps led	Winning driver	Winning team	No.	Manufacturer	Report
1	Beef. It's What's for Dinner. 300	Austin Hill	Austin Hill	Austin Hill	Richard Childress Racing	21	Chevrolet	Report
2	Production Alliance Group 300	Austin Hill	John Hunter Nemechek	John Hunter Nemechek	Joe Gibbs Racing	20	Toyota	Report
3	Alsco Uniforms 300	Chandler Smith	Chandler Smith	Austin Hill	Richard Childress Racing	21	Chevrolet	Report
4	United Rentals 200	Cole Custer	Sammy Smith	Sammy Smith	Joe Gibbs Racing	18	Toyota	Report
5	RAPTOR King of Tough 250	Sammy Smith	Austin Hill	Austin Hill	Richard Childress Racing	21	Chevrolet	Report
6	Pit Boss 250	A. J. Allmendinger	A. J. Allmendinger	A. J. Allmendinger	Kaulig Racing	10	Chevrolet	Report
7	ToyotaCare 250	Justin Allgaier	Chandler Smith	Chandler Smith	Kaulig Racing	16	Chevrolet	Report
8	Call 811.com Before You Dig 250	Cole Custer	John Hunter Nemechek	John Hunter Nemechek	Joe Gibbs Racing	20	Toyota	Report
9	Ag-Pro 300	Austin Hill	Brett Moffitt	Jeb Burton	Jordan Anderson Racing	27	Chevrolet	Report
10	A-GAME 200	Parker Kligerman	Ryan Truex	Ryan Truex	Joe Gibbs Racing	19	Toyota	Report
11	Shriners Children's 200	John Hunter Nemechek	John Hunter Nemechek	Kyle Larson	Kaulig Racing	10	Chevrolet	Report
12	Alsco Uniforms 300	Justin Allgaier	Justin Allgaier	Justin Allgaier	JR Motorsports	7	Chevrolet	Report
13	Pacific Office Automation 147	Sheldon Creed	Sheldon Creed	Cole Custer	Stewart–Haas Racing	00	Ford	Report
14	DoorDash 250	Kyle Larson	Kyle Larson	Aric Almirola	RSS Racing	28	Ford	Report
15	Tennessee Lottery 250	Cole Custer	Chandler Smith	A. J. Allmendinger	Kaulig Racing	10	Chevrolet	Report
16	The Loop 121	Cole Custer	Cole Custer	Cole Custer	Stewart–Haas Racing	00	Ford	Report
17	Alsco Uniforms 250	Chandler Smith	Justin Haley	John Hunter Nemechek	Joe Gibbs Racing	20	Toyota	Report
18	Ambetter Health 200	Chandler Smith	John Hunter Nemechek	John Hunter Nemechek	Joe Gibbs Racing	20	Toyota	Report
19	Explore the Pocono Mountains 225	Josh Berry	Josh Berry	Austin Hill	Richard Childress Racing	21	Chevrolet	Report
20	Road America 180	A. J. Allmendinger	Justin Allgaier	Sam Mayer	JR Motorsports	1	Chevrolet	Report
21	Cabo Wabo 250	Josh Berry	John Hunter Nemechek	John Hunter Nemechek	Joe Gibbs Racing	20	Toyota	Report
22	Pennzoil 150	A. J. Allmendinger	Ty Gibbs	Ty Gibbs	Joe Gibbs Racing	19	Toyota	Report
23	Shriners Children's 200 at The Glen	Ty Gibbs	Ty Gibbs	Sam Mayer	JR Motorsports	1	Chevrolet	Report
24	Wawa 250	Austin Hill	Austin Hill	Justin Allgaier	JR Motorsports	7	Chevrolet	Report
25	Sport Clips Haircuts VFW 200	John Hunter Nemechek	John Hunter Nemechek	Denny Hamlin	Joe Gibbs Racing	19	Toyota	Report
26	Kansas Lottery 300	Justin Allgaier	John Hunter Nemechek	John Hunter Nemechek	Joe Gibbs Racing	20	Toyota	Report
NASCAR Xfinity Series Playoffs
Round of 12
27	Food City 300	Cole Custer	Justin Allgaier	Justin Allgaier	JR Motorsports	7	Chevrolet	Report
28	Andy's Frozen Custard 300	Justin Allgaier	Justin Allgaier	John Hunter Nemechek	Joe Gibbs Racing	20	Toyota	Report
29	Drive for the Cure 250	Sam Mayer	Sam Mayer	Sam Mayer	JR Motorsports	1	Chevrolet	Report
Round of 8
30	Alsco Uniforms 302	Josh Berry	Riley Herbst	Riley Herbst	Stewart–Haas Racing	98	Ford	Report
31	Contender Boats 300	Cole Custer	Cole Custer	Sam Mayer	JR Motorsports	1	Chevrolet	Report
32	Dead On Tools 250	Sammy Smith	Sammy Smith	Justin Allgaier	JR Motorsports	7	Chevrolet	Report
Championship 4
33	NASCAR Xfinity Series Championship Race	Sammy Smith	Cole Custer	Cole Custer	Stewart–Haas Racing	00	Ford	Report

=== Drivers' championship ===
(key) Bold – Pole position awarded by time. Italics – Pole position set by competition-based formula. * – Most laps led. ^{1} – Stage 1 winner. ^{2} – Stage 2 winner ^{1–10} – Regular season top 10 finishers.
. – Eliminated after Round of 12 . – Eliminated after Round of 8

Pos	Driver	DAY	CAL	LVS	PHO	ATL	COA	RCH	MAR	TAL	DOV	DAR	CLT	PIR	SON	NSH	CSC	ATL	NHA	POC	ROA	MCH	IRC	GLN	DAY	DAR	KAN	BRI	TEX	ROV	LVS	HOM	MAR	PHO	Pts.	Stage	Bonus
1	Cole Custer	9	27^{12}	12	**12**	12	32	5	**3**	4	7	3	3	1^{2}	6	**9**	**1***^{12}	3	22	33	30	16	6	7	5	4	36	**4**^{1}	6	2	3^{1}	**13***^{1}	19	1*^{2}	4040	–	18^{4}
2	Justin Allgaier	3^{2}	3	2	36^{12}	29	5	13	6	28^{1}	3	2	**1***	2	7	15	3	17	6^{1}	23	18*^{12}	14^{1}	5	16	1	7	**18**	1*^{2}	**5***^{12}	37^{1}	6	15	1^{1}	3	4034	–	35^{3}
3	Sam Mayer	27	2	7	11	9	7	17	31	29	9	8	35	3	10	3	18	5	18	2	1	5	2	1	19	11	37	35	38	**1***	5	1	25	5	4032	–	20^{6}
4	John Hunter Nemechek	2	1*	6^{1}	6	8	27	2	1*^{12}	32	5	**5***^{2}	2	10	16	6	2	1	1*	32	34	1*^{2}	13	6	28	**3***^{12}	1*^{12}	3	1	8^{2}	2	3	18	28^{1}	4009	–	55^{2}
NASCAR Xfinity Series Playoffs cut-off
Pos	Driver	DAY	CAL	LVS	PHO	ATL	COA	RCH	MAR	TAL	DOV	DAR	CLT	PIR	SON	NSH	CSC	ATL	NHA	POC	ROA	MCH	IRC	GLN	DAY	DAR	KAN	BRI	TEX	ROV	LVS	HOM	MAR	PHO	Pts.	Stage	Bonus
5	Austin Hill	**1***^{1}	6	1^{2}	7	1*^{1}	37	9	16	**18**	4	4	4	5	8	4	5	12	3	1	3	11	4	14	**23***^{1}	2	5	33	7	9	7	4	21	7	2273	32	39^{1}
6	Sammy Smith **(R)**	19	19	17	1*	17	4	19	2	33	6	11	10	30	9	34	6	10	5^{2}	6	31	38	28	18	21	17	35	9	3	11	17	9	**3***^{2}	**9**	2248	31	7
7	Sheldon Creed	34	23	9	3	21	9^{2}	6	27	2	11	25	28	**7***^{1}	11	17	11	35^{2}	21	11	26	12	8	2	2^{2}	8	3	11	8	10	15	26	2	2	2225	17	8^{7}
8	Daniel Hemric	36	12	10	10	2	6	24	7	21	10	16	22	33	13	8	7	2	4	5	11	15	27	23	3	10	34	2	24	7	9	6	6	21	2224	37	3^{8}
9	Chandler Smith **(R)**	12	4	**3***	5	28	12	1*^{1}	10	25	13	36	13	9	14	12*^{2}	8	**20**	**2**	20	37	20	34	8	22	12	32	5	4	12	4	34	36	8	2219	34	9^{9}
10	Parker Kligerman	23	10	11	15	4^{2}	30	8	17	3	38	13	38	14	5	11	9	8	32	9	2	8	7	3	4	24	4	31	2	6	13	7	10	16	2209	33	2^{10}
11	Josh Berry	26	5	5	8	7	8	3^{2}	4	30	2	7	15	4	33	5	24	19	17	**24***^{12}	6	**2**	14	20	17	5	6	36	27	3	**12**	32	5	6	2172	25	9^{5}
12	Jeb Burton	11	22	14	22	16	21	12	14	1^{2}	18	12	7	25	26	13	19	13	7	12	12	10	16	10	12	18	12	13	31	34	22	20	9	12	2126	2	6
13	Riley Herbst	6	7	8	4	5	10	23	30	23	21	38	14	32	15	2	24	36^{1}	20	4	5	6	12	35	24	6	23	8	37	4	1*^{2}	2	4	4	904	169	7
14	Brandon Jones	14	33	21	23	19	11	21	5	14	8	34	9	13	21	24	29	33	11	7	10	3	21	11	36	14	2	34	9	29	8	8	16	11	793	135	–
15	Brett Moffitt	29	9	22	13	6	34	22	9	12*	15	20	29	12	12	14	4	11	9	8	36	17	10	29	18	25	7	16	10	38	24	35	20	15	680	47	–
16	Parker Retzlaff **(R)**	4	20	37	18	27	17	16	11	7	17	24	6	17	38	10	28	16	31	35	14	9	17	26	7	13	11	15	30	22	14	12	7	13	662	31	–
17	Kaz Grala	32	13	23	34	35	18	4	15	24	12	9	16	26	20	16	10	14	13	25	7	21	9	28	20	28	10	10	29	5	35	30	28	10	617	26	–
18	Ryan Sieg	8	14	24	16	11	23	7	18	22	16	27	24	18	28	19	25	37	33	22	13	13	32	21	6	30	30	6	11	13	16	14	35	18	606	34	–
19	Jeremy Clements	17	18	25	20	15	14	36	32	19	19	14	19	22	17	22	20	15	15	15	27	26	19	37	26	21	15	24	18	23	30	21	17	20	533	9	–
20	Anthony Alfredo	24	17	19	14	14	16	38	24	37	36	15	32	21	37	23	27	34	34	13	16	18	23	31	8	33	27	25	14	30	34	28	8	24	454	23	–
21	Josh Williams	15	16	30	21	32		33	19	10	23	17	18	16	35	33	36	9	8	36	21	22	33	36	27	37	13	20	20	20	33	17	14	25	446	6	–
22	Kyle Sieg	21	15	20	25	26	26	20	35	15	29	30	11	34		25		7	23	16	32	19	30	19	13	35	20	21	12	32	18	22	38	38	428	4	–
23	Joe Graf Jr.	7	11	15	31	25	31	37	37	20	22	32	17	23	31	21	33	21	29	17	23	27	35	22	34	26	9	26	36	31	37	10	29	31	395	6	–
24	Brennan Poole	33	25	33	29	13	33	34	29	5	24	23	30	38	DNQ	20	26	28	24	29	15	29	25	12		20	28	22	34	17	25	19	32	29	366	–	–
25	Ryan Ellis	35	34	27	19	23	20	15	28	11	25	33	27			28	31	25	19	18	35	23	29	30	32	29	17	18	13	36	27	24	24	26	366	–	–
26	Kyle Weatherman			16	17	33	22	DNQ	34		14		20		22	18	14	31	27		20	35	20	13	33	31	38	23	15	26	36	16		17	336	–	–
27	Jeffrey Earnhardt	28	26	29	33	34	25	18	20	31	37	26	21	19	36	27	DNQ	23		19		24			11			32	32			18	26	23	272	1	–
28	Connor Mosack **(R)**				24	30	19	28	33				23	8	32	35	35		26	34	29	36	26	5	37		14	14		24	19	31	31	34	270	8	–
29	Blaine Perkins **(R)**	37	31	35	35	22		26	13	34		37	37	15	30	26	17	32	25	27	17	33	31	38	25	34	33	28	DNQ	28	28	29	22	32	258	–	–
30	Alex Labbé	DNQ	28	18			15	11	26					11	25		21		12	28	33		11	24						15					246	16	–
31	Ryan Truex				2	3			12	17	1*^{12}	35																							197	41	7
32	Myatt Snider	5												6																14	11		15	22	166	17	–
33	Josh Bilicki	DNQ		31			28			26					19			18			8		18	25				27		25			23		164	8	–
34	Patrick Emerling			34	30	18		29	21		33	21	31	20					14	26	22	34		DNQ		36		QL^{≠}	35		38	25			164	–	–
35	Sage Karam					31	35					31			34	DNQ	22			38	4	25	15	15					23	27					160	14	–
36	Joey Gase	18	29	38	26	37		27		9						31	DNQ			31					14		24		26		32			27	152	–	–
37	Gray Gaulding	20	38	32	37	20		35	23	8	27	29													9						DNQ				132	–	–
38	Garrett Smithley	DNQ	DNQ	36	32	36	DNQ	30	DNQ	16	31	DNQ	33	24				26		21		30			16		25		DNQ		DNQ				125	–	–
39	C. J. McLaughlin	31	37	PR^{‡}						13	34		DNQ			PR^{±}			28			DNQ					22		25		29	37	13		103	–	–
40	Leland Honeyman				27			25	25					28	DNQ						28						26			21		23		DNQ	93	–	–
41	Mason Massey															32		24	10			DNQ					16					27			76	–	–
42	Parker Chase	16					DNQ			38				35			16	27											16						76	–	–
43	Trevor Bayne																								29			7	33						72	30	–
44	Layne Riggs																												19		10		11		71	–	–
45	Miguel Paludo						13										13						22												63	–	–
46	Dawson Cram				38	DNQ		DNQ	36		DNQ	DNQ	36			DNQ	DNQ			DNQ		28				DNQ	21		21		31	36		19	59	–	–
47	David Starr	22	35							DNQ						30		22											22						54	–	–
48	Dale Earnhardt Jr.																											30				5			48	9	–
49	Preston Pardus						36							31			12						24							DNQ					45	–	–
50	Brad Perez						29							RL^{§}	29		32				19		38											DNQ	40	–	–
51	Caesar Bacarella	QL^{†}				38				6															31										38	–	–
52	Chad Finchum								DNQ			DNQ				DNQ			35							22		29					27		35	–	–
53	Alex Guenette																15								38					33					27	–	–
54	Jordan Anderson																								15										22	–	–
55	Jordan Taylor													27																16					21	–	–
56	Dylan Lupton													29	24																				21	–	–
57	J. J. Yeley																								30				28			DNQ	34	36	20	–	–
58	Stanton Barrett																				24			32											18	–	–
59	Ryan Reed																														20				17	–	–
60	Dexter Stacey	DNQ								35							DNQ				25														14	–	–
61	Jade Buford	25								36																									13	–	–
62	Spencer Pumpelly																28																		9	–	–
63	Jesse Iwuji	30								DNQ																									7	–	–
64	Natalie Decker												34												35							DNQ			5	–	–
65	Brent Sherman																34																		3	–	–
66	Max McLaughlin																							34											3	–	–
67	Andre Castro																37						36												2	–	–
68	B. J. McLeod																											37							1	–	–
69	Devin Jones																													DNQ			37		1	–	–
70	Justin Marks																38																		1	–	–
71	Katherine Legge																				38														1	–	–
72	Ryan Newman																															38			1	–	–
	Cameron Lawrence						DNQ																												0	–	–
	Baltazar Leguizamón						DNQ																												0	–	–
	Mike Harmon									DNQ																									0	–	–
	Jason White									DNQ																									0	–	–
	Dexter Bean																DNQ																		0	–	–
	Camden Murphy																						DNQ												0	–	–
	Colin Garrett																						DNQ												0	–	–
	Casey Carden																							DNQ											0	–	–
	Boris Said																													DNQ					0	–	–
	Andy Lally																													DNQ					0	–	–
	Brian Weber				PR^{¶}																														0	–	–
Ineligible for Xfinity Series driver points
Pos	Driver	DAY	CAL	LVS	PHO	ATL	COA	RCH	MAR	TAL	DOV	DAR	CLT	PIR	SON	NSH	CSC	ATL	NHA	POC	ROA	MCH	IRC	GLN	DAY	DAR	KAN	BRI	TEX	ROV	LVS	HOM	MAR	PHO	Pts.	Stage	Bonus
	A. J. Allmendinger						**1***^{1}								2	1					**9**		**3**^{12}														
	Ty Gibbs						3						5^{12}		4	37^{1}		6				4	1*	**17***^{12}													
	Kyle Larson											1^{1}			**3***^{12}											38											
	Aric Almirola						24								1																						
	Denny Hamlin																									1											
	William Byron						2																														
	Chase Elliott																			3																	
	Ross Chastain		24									18			18							7	37	4		23											
	Kyle Busch			4	9								QL^{¤}											27		9											
	Justin Haley	10				10							12					4*							10												
	Carson Hocevar						38					6	8			36						32															
	Zane Smith															7																					
	Derek Kraus							10	8	27	20																8	12				11^{2}		37			
	Austin Dillon		8																16																		
	Alex Bowman																							9													
	Corey Heim										35	10								37						15											
	Daniel Suárez														27					10																	
	Rajah Caruth		21	26							26		25						37							16	29	17		19	23		12	14			
	Stefan Parsons	13						32			28	22	26	37		38			36	DNQ	PR^{∞}	31		33		19		19	RL^{~}	18	26			33			
	Tyler Reddick		36	13																																	
	Ty Dillon											19			23					14																	
	Chris Hacker							14											30														30	35			
	Daniel Dye																												17		21			PR^{÷}			
	Matt Mills								22			28														27	19					DNQ					
	Chad Chastain					24					32					29				30																	
	Bayley Currey	38	30	28	28																																
	Akinori Ogata																	29															33				
	Timmy Hill	DNQ	32		DNQ						30		DNQ							DNQ						32	QL^{^}	38					DNQ	30			
	Mason Maggio			DNQ				31						36				30				37										33					
	Nick Leitz																										31										
	Conor Daly																						DNQ							35							
	Greg Van Alst																	38	38																		
	Kaden Honeycutt								38																												
	Ryan Vargas	DNQ	DNQ	DNQ																																	
	Mason Filippi														DNQ																						
	Will Rodgers																						DNQ														
Pos	Driver	DAY	CAL	LVS	PHO	ATL	COA	RCH	MAR	TAL	DOV	DAR	CLT	PIR	SON	NSH	CSC	ATL	NHA	POC	ROA	MCH	IRC	GLN	DAY	DAR	KAN	BRI	TEX	ROV	LVS	HOM	MAR	PHO	Pts.	Stage	Bonus
^{†} – Caesar Bacarella suffered from stomach issues after qualifying for the race at Daytona in February and was replaced by Stefan Parsons in the race.^{‡} – C. J. McLaughlin was replaced by Patrick Emerling in the race at Las Vegas in March due to getting injured in practice. Neither driver made a lap in qualifying.^{±} C. J. McLaughlin was replaced by Joey Gase in the race at Nashville due to suffering a crash in practice.^{¶} – Brian Weber was replaced by Timmy Hill before qualifying for the race at Phoenix in March.^{¤} – Kyle Busch was replaced by Justin Haley after qualifying for the race at Charlotte in May.^{§} – Due to suffering from food poisoning, Leland Honeyman was replaced by Brad Perez during the race at Portland. Since Honeyman started the race, he is officially credited with 28th place.^{∞} – Stefan Parsons replaced Alex Labbé in practice for the race at Road America. Neither driver made a lap in qualifying.^{^} – At Kansas in September (race #26), Timmy Hill qualified the No. 66 car but after Honeyman failed to qualify for the race in his own No. 44 car, he replaced Timmy Hill in the No. 66.^{≠} – At Bristol (race #27), Patrick Emerling was replaced by B. J. McLeod in the No. 35 car in the race after crashing his car in the practice and not having a backup car.^{~} – Due to feeling ill, Josh Williams was replaced by Stefan Parsons during the race at Texas (race #28). Since Williams started the race, he is officially credited with 20th place.^{÷} – Daniel Dye was scheduled to drive the No. 44 at Phoenix in November (season finale), but due to a hard crash in the Truck Series season finale in the previous day, he was not cleared to race and was replaced by Leland Honeyman in the qualifying but Honeyman failed to qualify.

=== Owners' championship (Top 15) ===
(key) Bold – Pole position awarded by time. Italics – Pole position set by competition-based formula. * – Most laps led. ^{1} – Stage 1 winner. ^{2} – Stage 2 winner ^{1–10} – Regular season top 10 finishers.
. – Eliminated after Round of 12 . – Eliminated after Round of 8

Pos.	No.	Car Owner	DAY	CAL	LVS	PHO	ATL	COA	RCH	MAR	TAL	DOV	DAR	CLT	PIR	SON	NSH	CSC	ATL	NHA	POC	ROA	MCH	IRC	GLN	DAY	DAR	KAN	BRI	TEX	ROV	LVS	HOM	MAR	PHO	Points	Bonus
1	00	Gene Haas	9	27^{12}	12	**12**	12	32	5	**3**	4	7	3	3	1^{2}	6	**9**	**1***^{12}	3	22	33	30	16	6	7	5	4	36	**4**^{1}	6	2	3^{1}	**13***^{1}	19	1*^{2}	4040	18^{4}
2	7	Kelley Earnhardt Miller	3^{2}	2	2	36^{12}	29	5	13	6	28^{1}	3	2	**1***	2	7	15	3	17	6^{1}	27	18*^{12}	14^{1}	5	16	1	7	**18**	1*^{2}	**5***^{12}	37^{1}	6	15	1^{1}	3	4034	35^{3}
3	1	L. W. Miller	27	2	7	11	9	7	17	31	29	9	8	35	3	10	3	18	5	18	2	1	5	2	1	19	11	37	35	38	**1***	5	1	25	5	4032	19^{7}
4	20	Joe Gibbs	2	1*	6^{1}	6	8	27	2	1*^{12}	32	5	**5***^{2}	2	10	16	6	2	1	1*	32	34	1*^{2}	13	6	28	**3***^{12}	1*^{12}	3	1	8^{2}	2	3	18	28^{1}	4009	55^{2}
NASCAR Xfinity Series Playoffs cut-off
5	21	Richard Childress	1*^{1}	6	1^{2}	7	1*^{1}	37	9	16	**18**	4	4	4	5	8	4	5	12	3	1	3	11	4	14	**23***^{1}	2	5	33	7	9	7	4	21	7	2273	39^{1}
6	18	Joe Gibbs	19	19	17	1*	17	4	19	2	33	6	11	10	30	9	34	6	10	5^{2}	6	31	38	28	18	21	17	35	9	3	11	17	9	**3***^{2}	**9**	2248	6
7	10	Matt Kaulig	10	8	4	9	10	**1***^{1}	10	8	27	20	1^{1}	12	27	2	1	38	4*	16	10	**9**	7	**3**^{12}	27	10	9	34	2	24	7	10	6	6	21	2227	6^{5}
8	2	Richard Childress	34	23	9	3	21	9^{2}	6	27	2	11	25	28	**7***^{1}	11	17	11	35^{2}	21	11	26	12	8	2	2^{2}	8	3	11	8	10	15	26	2	2	2224	7^{8}
9	16	Matt Kaulig	12	4	**3***	5	28	12	1*^{1}	10	25	13	36	13	9	14	12*^{2}	8	**20**	**2**	20	37	20	34	8	22	12	32	5	4	12	4	34	36	8	2217	7
10	19	Joe Gibbs	5	11	15	2	3	3	37	12	17	1*^{12}	35	5^{12}	6	4	37^{1}	35	6	29	34	29	4	1*	**17***^{12}	29	1	9	7	33	14	11	10	15	22	2194	9^{9}
11	8	Dale Earnhardt Jr.	26	5	5	8	7	8	3^{2}	4	30	2	7	15	4	33	5	23	19	17	**24***^{12}	6	**2**	14	20	17	5	6	36	27	3	**12**	32	5	6	2171	8^{6}
12	27	Jordan Anderson	11	22	14	22	16	21	12	14	1^{2}	18	12	7	25	26	13	19	13	7	12	12	10	16	10	15	18	12	13	31	34	22	20	9	12	2126	6
13	48	Scott Borchetta	23	10	11	15	4^{2}	30	8	17	3	38	13	38	14	5	11	9	8	32	9	2	8	7	3	4	24	4	31	2	6	13	7	10	16	905	1
14	98	Tony Stewart	6	7	8	4	5	10	23	30	23	21	38	14	32	15	2	24	36^{1}	20	4	5	6	12	35	24	6	23	8	37	4	1*^{2}	2	4	4	904	7
15	11	Matt Kaulig	36	12	10	10	2	6	24	7	21	10	16	22	33	13	8	7	2	4	5	11	15	27	23	3	10	8	12	19	16	10	11^{2}	11	37	898	–^{10}
Pos.	No.	Car Owner	DAY	CAL	LVS	PHO	ATL	COA	RCH	MAR	TAL	DOV	DAR	CLT	PIR	SON	NSH	CSC	ATL	NHA	POC	ROA	MCH	IRC	GLN	DAY	DAR	KAN	BRI	TEX	ROV	LVS	HOM	MAR	PHO	Points	Bonus

=== Manufacturers' championship ===
Pos	Manufacturer	Wins	Points
1	Chevrolet	17	1234
2	Toyota	11	1136
3	Ford	5	1095

== See also ==
- 2023 NASCAR Cup Series
- 2023 NASCAR Craftsman Truck Series
- 2023 ARCA Menards Series
- 2023 ARCA Menards Series East
- 2023 ARCA Menards Series West
- 2023 NASCAR Whelen Modified Tour
- 2023 NASCAR Pinty's Series
- 2023 NASCAR Mexico Series
- 2023 NASCAR Whelen Euro Series
- 2023 NASCAR Brasil Sprint Race
- 2023 SRX Series
- 2023 CARS Tour
- 2023 SMART Modified Tour
