= 2023 Production Alliance Group 300 =

2nd race of the 2023 NASCAR Xfinity Series

Race details
- Race 2 of 33 of the 2023 NASCAR Xfinity Series
- Date: February 26, 2023
- Official name: 24th Annual Production Alliance Group 300
- Location: Auto Club Speedway, Fontana, California
- Course: Permanent racing facility
- Course length: 2.0 miles (3.1 km)
- Distance: 150 laps, 300 mi (480 km)
- Scheduled distance: 150 laps, 300 mi (480 km)
- Average speed: 115.471 mph (185.833 km/h)

Pole position
Driver	Austin Hill	Richard Childress Racing
- Grid positions set by competition-based formula

Most laps led
Driver	John Hunter Nemechek	Joe Gibbs Racing
- Laps: 49

Winner
No. 20	John Hunter Nemechek	Joe Gibbs Racing

Television in the United States
- Network: FS2
- Announcers: Adam Alexander, Ryan Blaney, and Joey Logano

Radio in the United States
- Radio: MRN

The 2023 Production Alliance Group 300 was the 2nd stock car race of the 2023 NASCAR Xfinity Series, and the 24th iteration of the event. The race took place at Auto Club Speedway in Fontana, California, a 2.0-mile (3.2 km) permanent tri-oval shaped superspeedway. The race was originally scheduled to be held on Saturday, February 25, 2023, but due to constant rain showers, the race was postponed until Sunday, February 26, immediately following the Pala Casino 400 Cup Series race on the same day.

The race took the scheduled 150 laps to complete. John Hunter Nemechek, driving for Joe Gibbs Racing, dominated the final stages of the race, and earned his third career NASCAR Xfinity Series win, along with his first of the season. To fill out the podium, Sam Mayer, driving for JR Motorsports, and Justin Allgaier, also driving for JR Motorsports, would finish 2nd and 3rd, respectively.

This was also the final Xfinity Series race, and final race ever, to be held on the 2.0 mile version of Auto Club Speedway, as the track will be renovated into a 0.5 mile short track in the mid-2020's.

== Background ==
Auto Club Speedway (previously California Speedway) was a two-mile (3.2 km), low-banked, D-shaped oval superspeedway in Fontana, California which hosted NASCAR racing annually from 1997 to 2023. It was also used for open wheel racing events. The racetrack was located near the former locations of Ontario Motor Speedway and Riverside International Raceway. The track was owned and operated by International Speedway Corporation and was the only track owned by ISC to have its naming rights sold. The speedway was served by the nearby Interstate 10 and Interstate 15 freeways as well as a Metrolink station located behind the backstretch.

=== Entry list ===
- (R) denotes rookie driver.
- (i) denotes driver who is ineligible for series driver points.

#	Driver	Team	Make
00	Cole Custer	Stewart-Haas Racing	Ford
1	Sam Mayer	JR Motorsports	Chevrolet
02	David Starr	Our Motorsports	Chevrolet
2	Sheldon Creed	Richard Childress Racing	Chevrolet
4	Bayley Currey	JD Motorsports	Chevrolet
6	Brennan Poole	JD Motorsports	Chevrolet
07	Blaine Perkins (R)	SS-Green Light Racing	Chevrolet
7	Justin Allgaier	JR Motorsports	Chevrolet
08	Gray Gaulding	SS-Green Light Racing	Ford
8	Josh Berry	JR Motorsports	Chevrolet
9	Brandon Jones	JR Motorsports	Chevrolet
10	Austin Dillon (i)	Kaulig Racing	Chevrolet
11	Daniel Hemric	Kaulig Racing	Chevrolet
16	Chandler Smith (R)	Kaulig Racing	Chevrolet
18	Sammy Smith (R)	Joe Gibbs Racing	Toyota
19	Joe Graf Jr.	Joe Gibbs Racing	Toyota
20	John Hunter Nemechek	Joe Gibbs Racing	Toyota
21	Austin Hill	Richard Childress Racing	Chevrolet
24	Tyler Reddick (i)	Sam Hunt Racing	Toyota
25	Brett Moffitt	AM Racing	Ford
26	Kaz Grala	Sam Hunt Racing	Toyota
27	Jeb Burton	Jordan Anderson Racing	Chevrolet
28	Alex Labbé	RSS Racing	Ford
31	Parker Retzlaff (R)	Jordan Anderson Racing	Chevrolet
35	Joey Gase	Emerling-Gase Motorsports	Ford
38	Kyle Sieg	RSS Racing	Ford
39	Ryan Sieg	RSS Racing	Ford
43	Ryan Ellis	Alpha Prime Racing	Chevrolet
44	Jeffrey Earnhardt	Alpha Prime Racing	Chevrolet
45	Rajah Caruth (i)	Alpha Prime Racing	Chevrolet
48	Parker Kligerman	Big Machine Racing	Chevrolet
51	Jeremy Clements	Jeremy Clements Racing	Chevrolet
53	C. J. McLaughlin	Emerling-Gase Motorsports	Chevrolet
66	Timmy Hill (i)	MBM Motorsports	Ford
74	Ryan Vargas	CHK Racing	Chevrolet
78	Anthony Alfredo	B. J. McLeod Motorsports	Chevrolet
91	Ross Chastain (i)	DGM Racing	Chevrolet
92	Josh Williams	DGM Racing	Chevrolet
98	Riley Herbst	Stewart-Haas Racing	Ford
99	Garrett Smithley	B. J. McLeod Motorsports	Chevrolet
Official entry list

== Starting lineup ==
Practice and qualifying were scheduled to be held on Saturday, February 25, at 9:05 AM PST, and 9:35 AM PST, but were both cancelled due to constant rain showers. The starting lineup would be determined by a performance-based metric system. As a result, Austin Hill, driving for Richard Childress Racing, would earn the pole. Garrett Smithley and Ryan Vargas would fail to qualify.

Pos.	#	Driver	Team	Make
1	21	Austin Hill	Richard Childress Racing	Chevrolet
2	20	John Hunter Nemechek	Joe Gibbs Racing	Toyota
3	7	Justin Allgaier	JR Motorsports	Chevrolet
4	31	Parker Retzlaff (R)	Jordan Anderson Racing	Chevrolet
5	16	Chandler Smith (R)	Kaulig Racing	Chevrolet
6	98	Riley Herbst	Stewart-Haas Racing	Ford
7	27	Jeb Burton	Jordan Anderson Racing	Chevrolet
8	00	Cole Custer	Stewart-Haas Racing	Ford
9	92	Josh Williams	DGM Racing	Chevrolet
10	9	Brandon Jones	JR Motorsports	Chevrolet
11	51	Jeremy Clements	Jeremy Clements Racing	Chevrolet
12	08	Gray Gaulding	SS-Green Light Racing	Ford
13	18	Sammy Smith (R)	Joe Gibbs Racing	Toyota
14	19	Joe Graf Jr.	Joe Gibbs Racing	Toyota
15	10	Austin Dillon (i)	Kaulig Racing	Chevrolet
16	39	Ryan Sieg	RSS Racing	Ford
17	78	Anthony Alfredo	B. J. McLeod Motorsports	Chevrolet
18	38	Kyle Sieg	RSS Racing	Ford
19	8	Josh Berry	JR Motorsports	Chevrolet
20	45	Rajah Caruth (i)	Alpha Prime Racing	Chevrolet
21	02	David Starr	Our Motorsports	Chevrolet
22	1	Sam Mayer	JR Motorsports	Chevrolet
23	48	Parker Kligerman	Big Machine Racing	Chevrolet
24	24	Tyler Reddick (i)	Sam Hunt Racing	Toyota
25	25	Brett Moffitt	AM Racing	Ford
26	44	Jeffrey Earnhardt	Alpha Prime Racing	Chevrolet
27	53	C. J. McLaughlin	Emerling-Gase Motorsports	Chevrolet
28	28	Alex Labbé	RSS Racing	Ford
29	26	Kaz Grala	Sam Hunt Racing	Toyota
30	6	Brennan Poole	JD Motorsports	Chevrolet
31	2	Sheldon Creed	Richard Childress Racing	Chevrolet
32	43	Ryan Ellis	Alpha Prime Racing	Chevrolet
33	07	Blaine Perkins (R)	SS-Green Light Racing	Chevrolet
Qualified by owner's points
34	35	Joey Gase	Emerling-Gase Motorsports	Toyota
35	11	Daniel Hemric	Kaulig Racing	Chevrolet
36	4	Bayley Currey	JD Motorsports	Chevrolet
37	66	Timmy Hill (i)	MBM Motorsports	Ford
38	91	Ross Chastain (i)	DGM Racing	Chevrolet
Failed to qualify
39	99	Garrett Smithley	B. J. McLeod Motorsports	Chevrolet
40	74	Ryan Vargas	CHK Racing	Chevrolet
Official starting lineup

== Race results ==
Stage 1 Laps: 35

Pos.	#	Driver	Team	Make	Pts
1	00	Cole Custer	Stewart-Haas Racing	Ford	10
2	21	Austin Hill	Richard Childress Racing	Chevrolet	9
3	16	Chandler Smith (R)	Kaulig Racing	Chevrolet	8
4	11	Daniel Hemric	Kaulig Racing	Chevrolet	7
5	98	Riley Herbst	Stewart-Haas Racing	Ford	6
6	2	Sheldon Creed	Richard Childress Racing	Chevrolet	5
7	25	Brett Moffitt	AM Racing	Ford	4
8	10	Austin Dillon (i)	Kaulig Racing	Chevrolet	0
9	20	John Hunter Nemechek	Joe Gibbs Racing	Toyota	2
10	48	Parker Kligerman	Big Machine Racing	Chevrolet	1

Stage 2 Laps: 35

Pos.	#	Driver	Team	Make	Pts
1	00	Cole Custer	Stewart-Haas Racing	Ford	10
2	20	John Hunter Nemechek	Joe Gibbs Racing	Toyota	9
3	18	Sammy Smith (R)	Joe Gibbs Racing	Chevrolet	8
4	10	Austin Dillon (i)	Kaulig Racing	Chevrolet	0
5	48	Parker Kligerman	Big Machine Racing	Chevrolet	6
6	7	Justin Allgaier	JR Motorsports	Chevrolet	5
7	1	Sam Mayer	JR Motorsports	Chevrolet	4
8	2	Sheldon Creed	Richard Childress Racing	Chevrolet	3
9	98	Riley Herbst	Stewart-Haas Racing	Ford	2
10	16	Chandler Smith (R)	Kaulig Racing	Chevrolet	1

Stage 3 Laps: 80

Fin	St	#	Driver	Team	Make	Laps	Led	Status	Pts
1	2	20	John Hunter Nemechek	Joe Gibbs Racing	Toyota	150	49	Running	51
2	22	1	Sam Mayer	JR Motorsports	Chevrolet	150	0	Running	39
3	3	7	Justin Allgaier	JR Motorsports	Chevrolet	150	8	Running	39
4	5	16	Chandler Smith (R)	Kaulig Racing	Chevrolet	150	1	Running	42
5	19	8	Josh Berry	JR Motorsports	Chevrolet	150	3	Running	32
6	1	21	Austin Hill	Richard Childress Racing	Chevrolet	150	4	Running	40
7	6	98	Riley Herbst	Stewart-Haas Racing	Ford	150	0	Running	38
8	15	10	Austin Dillon (i)	Kaulig Racing	Chevrolet	150	10	Running	0
9	25	25	Brett Moffitt	AM Racing	Ford	150	0	Running	32
10	23	48	Parker Kligerman	Big Machine Racing	Chevrolet	150	0	Running	34
11	14	19	Joe Graf Jr.	Joe Gibbs Racing	Toyota	150	0	Running	26
12	35	11	Daniel Hemric	Kaulig Racing	Chevrolet	150	0	Running	32
13	29	26	Kaz Grala	Sam Hunt Racing	Toyota	150	0	Running	24
14	16	39	Ryan Sieg	RSS Racing	Ford	150	0	Running	23
15	18	38	Kyle Sieg	RSS Racing	Ford	150	0	Running	22
16	9	92	Josh Williams	DGM Racing	Chevrolet	150	0	Running	21
17	17	78	Anthony Alfredo	B. J. McLeod Motorsports	Chevrolet	150	0	Running	20
18	11	51	Jeremy Clements	Jeremy Clements Racing	Chevrolet	150	0	Running	19
19	13	18	Sammy Smith (R)	Joe Gibbs Racing	Toyota	150	14	Running	26
20	4	31	Parker Retzlaff (R)	Jordan Anderson Racing	Chevrolet	150	0	Running	17
21	20	45	Rajah Caruth (i)	Alpha Prime Racing	Chevrolet	150	0	Running	0
22	7	27	Jeb Burton	Jordan Anderson Racing	Chevrolet	150	0	Running	15
23	31	2	Sheldon Creed	Richard Childress Racing	Chevrolet	150	15	Running	22
24	38	91	Ross Chastain (i)	DGM Racing	Chevrolet	150	0	Running	0
25	30	6	Brennan Poole	JD Motorsports	Chevrolet	150	0	Running	12
26	26	44	Jeffrey Earnhardt	Alpha Prime Racing	Chevrolet	150	0	Running	11
27	8	00	Cole Custer	Stewart-Haas Racing	Ford	149	46	Running	30
28	28	28	Alex Labbé	RSS Racing	Ford	149	0	Running	9
29	34	35	Joey Gase	Emerling-Gase Motorsports	Toyota	149	0	Running	8
30	36	4	Bayley Currey	JD Motorsports	Chevrolet	149	0	Running	7
31	33	07	Blaine Perkins (R)	SS-Green Light Racing	Chevrolet	149	0	Running	6
32	37	66	Timmy Hill (i)	MBM Motorsports	Ford	149	0	Running	0
33	10	9	Brandon Jones	JR Motorsports	Chevrolet	149	0	Running	4
34	32	43	Ryan Ellis	Alpha Prime Racing	Chevrolet	149	0	Running	3
35	21	02	David Starr	Our Motorsports	Chevrolet	148	0	Running	2
36	24	24	Tyler Reddick (i)	Sam Hunt Racing	Toyota	148	0	Running	0
37	27	53	C. J. McLaughlin	Emerling-Gase Motorsports	Chevrolet	147	0	Running	1
38	12	08	Gray Gaulding	SS-Green Light Racing	Ford	26	0	Accident	1
Official race results

== Standings after theace ==
Drivers' Championship standings

	Pos	Driver	Points
	1	Austin Hill	98
1	2	John Hunter Nemechek	91 (–7)
1	3	Justin Allgaier	91 (–7)
1	4	Chandler Smith	76 (–22)
1	5	Riley Herbst	73 (–25)
4	6	Cole Custer	60 (–38)
12	7	Sam Mayer	58 (–40)
1	8	Joe Graf Jr.	56 (–42)
8	9	Josh Berry	52 (–46)
2	10	Ryan Sieg	52 (–46)
11	11	Parker Kligerman	51 (–47)
6	12	Parker Retzlaff	50 (–48)
Official driver's standings

- Note: Only the first 12 positions are included for the driver standings.

Previous race: 2023 Beef. It's What's for Dinner. 300	NASCAR Xfinity Series; 2023 season	Next race: 2023 Alsco Uniforms 300 (Las Vegas)
