= Patrick Emerling =

American racing driver (born 1992)

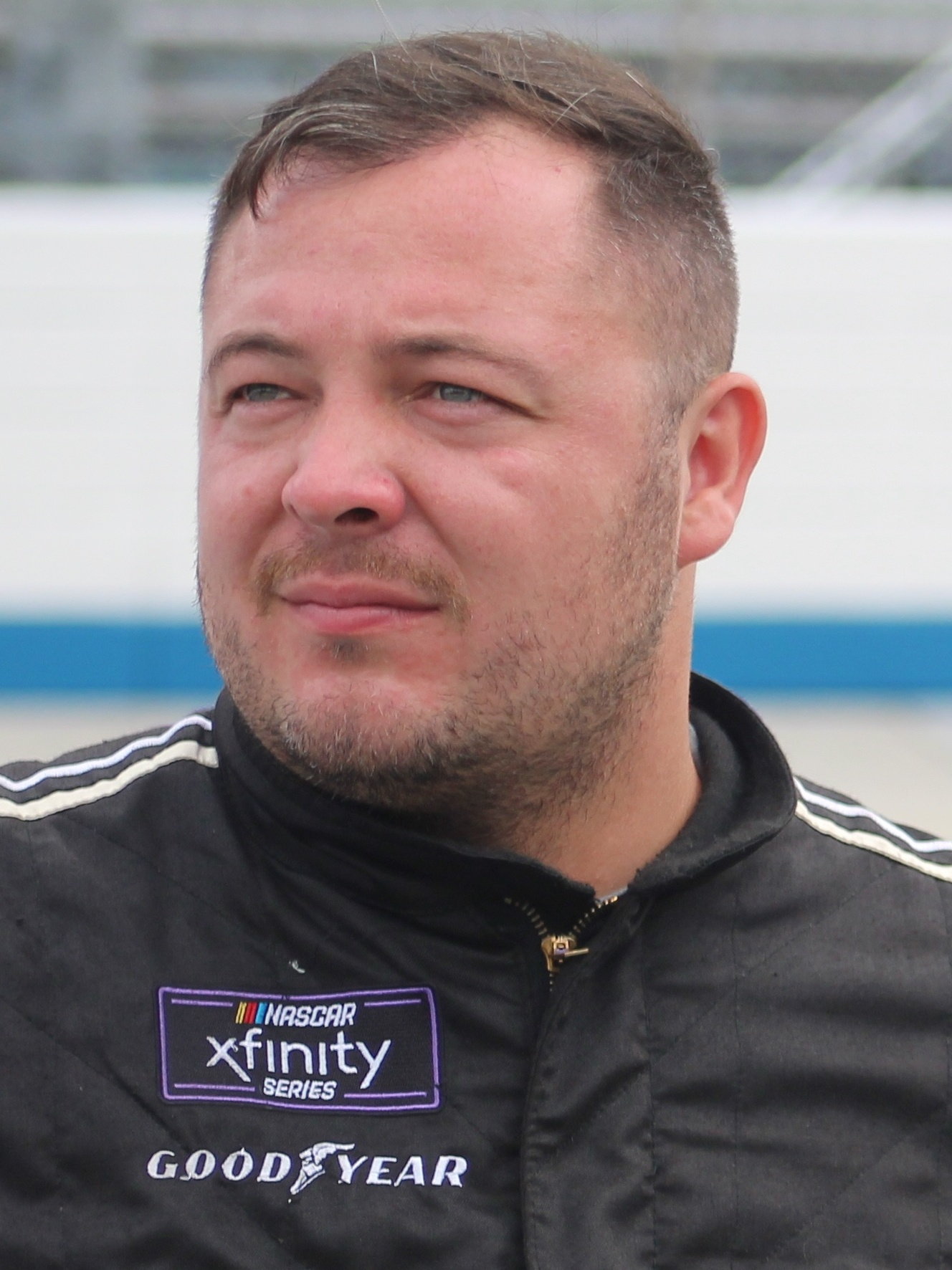
- Emerling at Dover Motor Speedway in 2023
- Born: Patrick W. Emerling; September 19, 1992 (age 34); Orchard Park, New York, U.S.
- Achievements: 2026 NASCAR Whelen Modified Tour Champion

NASCAR O'Reilly Auto Parts Series career
- 64 races run over 7 years
- 2026 position: 78th
- Best finish: 34th (2023)
- First race: 2020 Cheddar's 300 (Bristol)
- Last race: 2026 National Debt Relief 250 (Martinsville)
Wins	Top tens	Poles
0	1	0

NASCAR FedEx Freight Truck Series career
- 6 races run over 3 years
- 2026 position: 91st
- Best finish: 38th (2025)
- First race: 2017 UNOH 175 (New Hampshire)
- Last race: 2026 Team EJP 175 (New Hampshire)
Wins	Top tens	Poles
0	0	0

ARCA Menards Series career
- 2 races run over 2 years
- Best finish: 93rd (2024)
- First race: 2023 General Tire 200 (Talladega)
- Last race: 2024 Hard Rock Bet 200 (Daytona)
Wins	Top tens	Poles
0	0	0
- Statistics up to date as of November 7, 2026.

Patrick W. Emerling (born September 19, 1992) is an American professional stock car racing driver and team owner. He last competed part-time in the NASCAR O'Reilly Auto Parts Series, driving the No. 38 Chevrolet Camaro SS/Ford Mustang Dark Horse for RSS Racing, and part-time in the NASCAR Craftsman Truck Series, driving the No. 22 Ford F-150 for Team Reaume. He has previously competed in the ARCA Menards Series.

Emerling is the 2026 NASCAR Whelen Modified Tour champion.

== Racing career ==
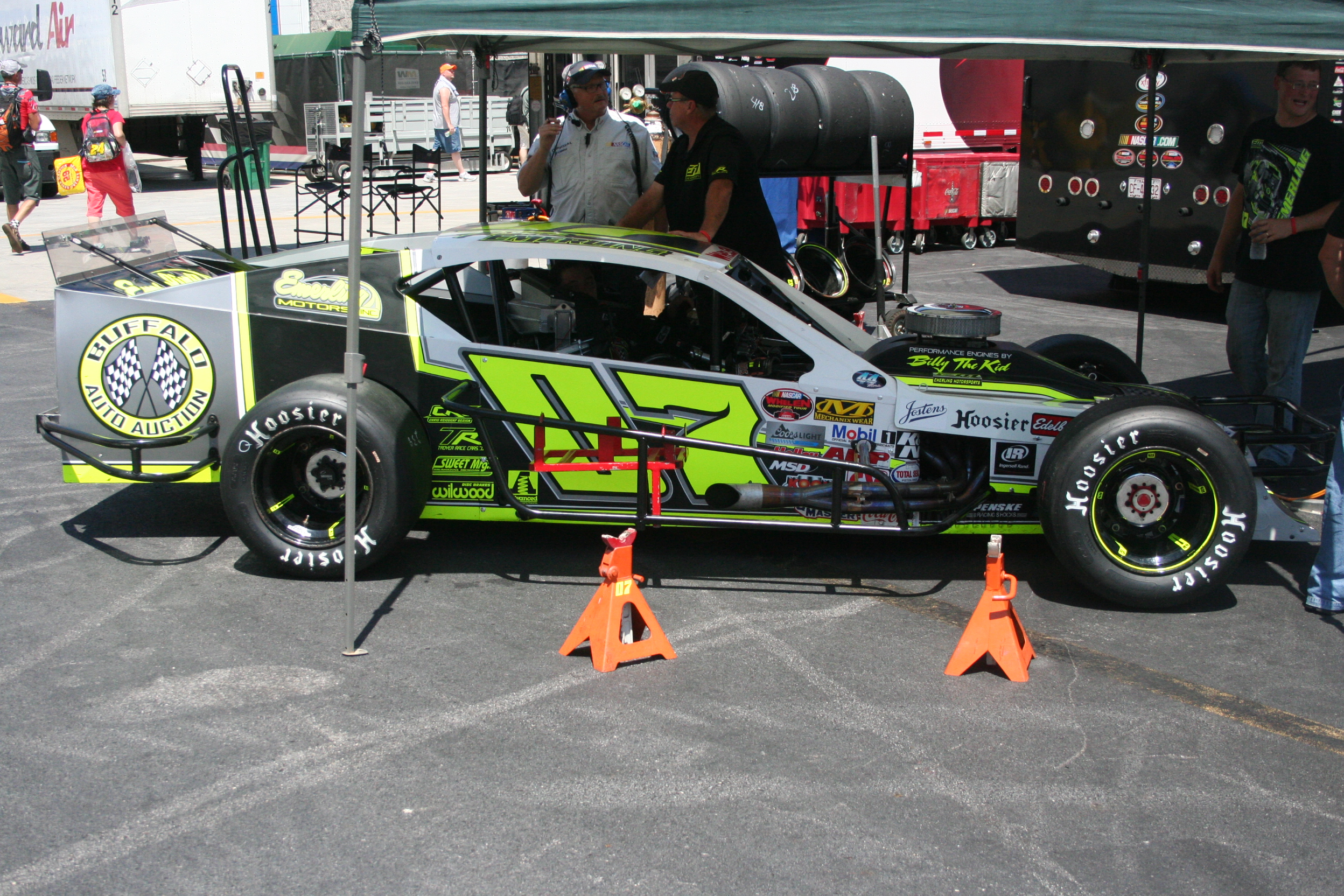
Emerling's 2015 NASCAR Whelen Modified Tour car

Emerling began racing in the NASCAR Whelen Modified Tour in 2011. He drove the No. 07 Chevrolet/Ford for his team. He ultimately finished thirteenth in the points standings.

Emerling kept running the full schedule in the series up to 2015, where he finished fifth in the overall standings. He only began running a few races in the succeeding years.

In 2017, Emerling got his first win in the series at Bristol, where he also began on the pole. He had two top-five finishes and three top-ten finishes in the season.

In 2017, Emerling made his Truck Series debut, driving the No. 83 Chevrolet Silverado for Copp Motorsports at Loudon. He started 20th and finished 23rd due to engine problems. He returned to the truck at Texas, where he started 23rd and finished 26th due to a crash.

In 2018, Emerling was barely beaten by Chase Dowling at Loudon and finished second in the race. He had a total of three top-fives and five top-tens.

Emerling continued running some Modified races in the 2019 season.

On May 20, 2020, it was announced that Emerling would make his debut in the Xfinity Series, driving the No. 02 for Our Motorsports at the Spring Bristol race.

On December 14, 2020, it was announced that Emerling would return to Our to run another part-time schedule with the team in 2021, although now in their new second car, the No. 03, as Brett Moffitt became the full-time driver of the No. 02 that Emerling drove in his one start in 2020. After the No. 03 failed to qualify for the first few races of the season due to it not having enough owner points with entry lists of over forty cars, Our Motorsports acquired the No. 23 car jointly fielded by RSS Racing and Reaume Brothers Racing before the race at Las Vegas in March, and Emerling ran his races in that car. He also finished second in the Modified Tour championship with three wins.

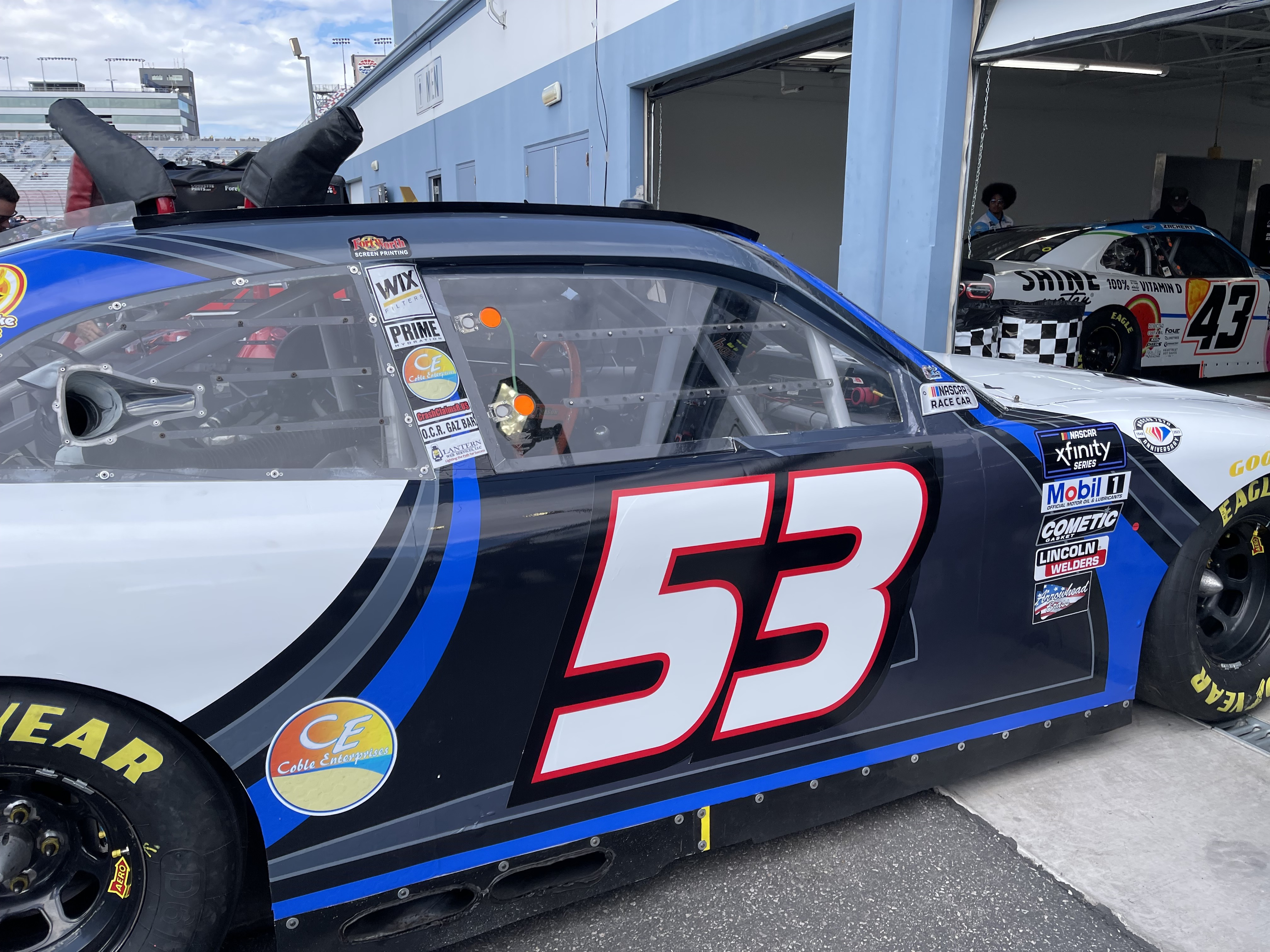
Emerling's No. 53 car in the garage at Las Vegas Motor Speedway in March 2023

Emerling teamed up with Joey Gase in 2022 to form Emerling-Gase Motorsports. The team would field the No. 35 car, which both he and Gase, as well as other drivers, drove part-time. At Daytona in August, Emerling would drive the No. 5 car for B. J. McLeod Motorsports after Natalie Decker, who was scheduled to drive the car in that race, pulled out after her sponsor (a hemp/CBD product that NASCAR has to examine in order to be approved as a sponsor) had not yet gotten approval by NASCAR in time for the race. Although BJMM typically fields Chevy's, Emerling's car was a Ford fielded in a collaboration with EGM, similar to how fellow Modified driver, Ryan Preece drove for the team earlier in the season in Fords fielded in a collaboration with Stewart–Haas Racing.

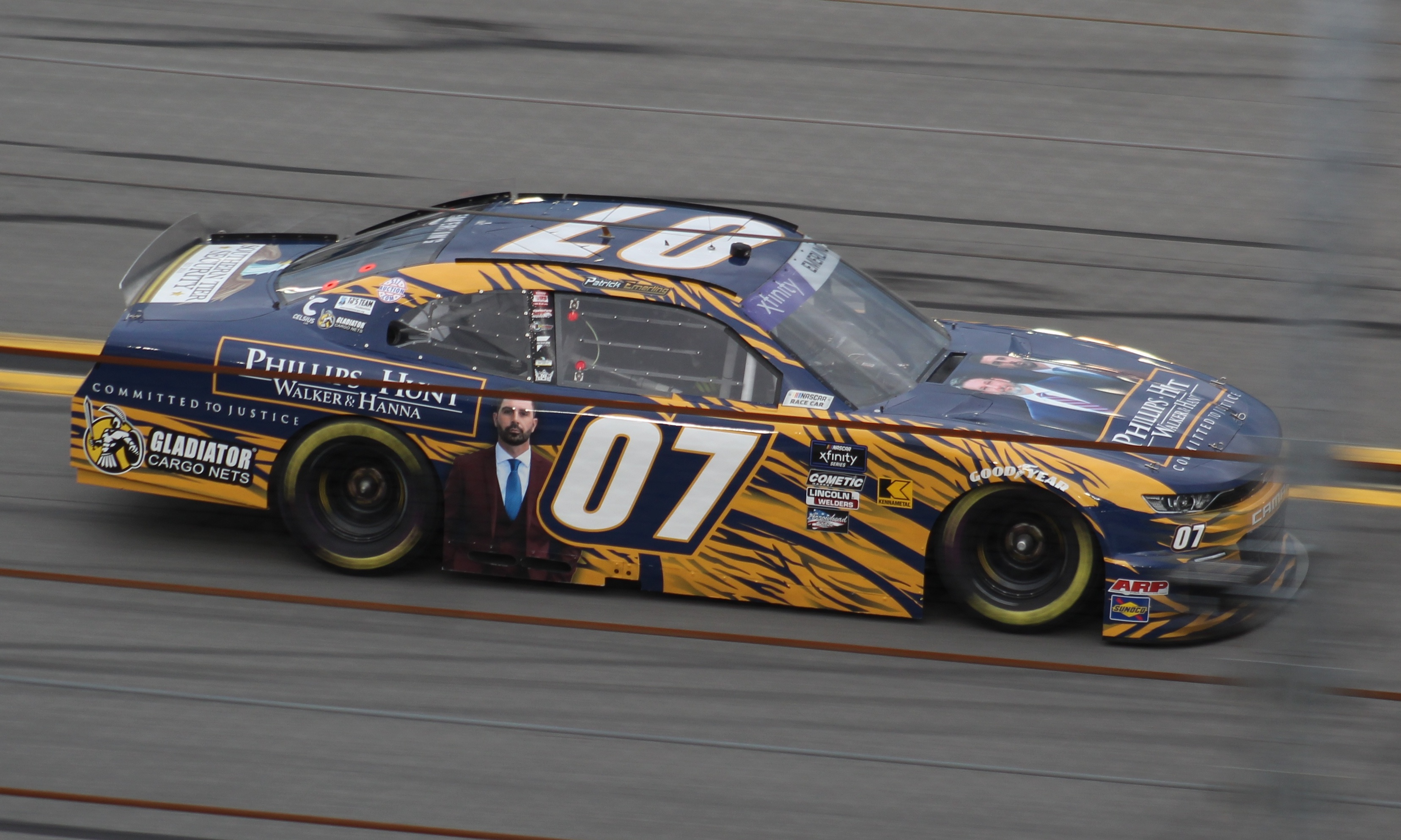
Emerling at Daytona International Speedway in February 2024

In 2024, Emerling would run nineteen races as the primary driver of the No. 07 for SS-Green Light Racing after he and Joey Gase parted ways. In addition to running part-time in the Xfinity Series, Emerling would return to full-time competition on the Whelen Modified Tour, partnering with Rich Gatreau to form a new team.

In 2025, Emerling would return for a second part–time season at SS-Green Light in the Xfinity Series, driving the No. 07. Emerling also competed in the Craftsman Truck Series, driving the No. 75 truck for Henderson Motorsports at North Wilkesboro, and the No. 07 truck for Spire Motorsports at Pocono. In addition, Emerling continued to pilot the No. 1 car full time on the Whelen Modified Tour, as well as part-time on the ROC Modified Tour and in open modified races.

On February 6, 2026, it was revealed that Emerling would return to the renamed O'Reilly Auto Parts Series in 2026, driving the No. 38 car for RSS Racing in the season-opener at Daytona. That same year, he continued to run full-time in the Whelen Modified Tour, where he won the championship.

== Motorsports career results ==
=== NASCAR ===
(key) (Bold – Pole position awarded by qualifying time. Italics – Pole position earned by points standings or practice time. * – Most laps led.)

==== O'Reilly Auto Parts Series ====
NASCAR O'Reilly Auto Parts Series results
Year	Team	No.	Make	1	2	3	4	5	6	7	8	9	10	11	12	13	14	15	16	17	18	19	20	21	22	23	24	25	26	27	28	29	30	31	32	33	NOAPC	Pts	Ref
2020	Our Motorsports	02	Chevy	DAY	LVS	CAL	PHO	DAR	CLT	BRI; 29	ATL	HOM	HOM	TAL	POC	IRC	KEN	KEN	TEX	KAN	ROA	DRC	DOV	DOV	DAY	DAR	RCH	RCH	BRI	LVS	TAL	ROV	KAN	TEX	MAR	PHO	64th	8	
2021	Our Motorsports	23	Chevy	DAY	DRC	HOM	LVS	PHO	ATL	MAR	TAL	DAR	DOV	COA	CLT	MOH	TEX	NSH	POC	ROA	ATL	NHA; 31	GLN	IRC	MCH	DAY	DAR	RCH; 32	BRI	LVS	TAL	ROV	TEX	KAN; 24	MAR	PHO	60th	25	
2022	Emerling-Gase Motorsports	35	Chevy	DAY	CAL	LVS	PHO	ATL	COA	RCH	MAR	TAL	DOV; 33	DAR; 24	TEX; 28	CLT		NSH; 26	ROA	ATL		POC; 29	IRC						BRI; 27	TEX	TAL	ROV	LVS		MAR; 32	PHO	41st	125	
2022	Emerling-Gase Motorsports	35	Toyota														PIR; 19				NHA; 16			MCH; 25	GLN									HOM; 23			41st	125	
2022	B. J. McLeod Motorsports with Emerling-Gase Motorsports	5	Ford																							DAY; QL^{†}	DAR	KAN									41st	125	
2023	Emerling-Gase Motorsports	53	Ford	DAY	CAL	LVS; 34				RCH; 29																											34th	164	
2023	Emerling-Gase Motorsports	53	Chevy				PHO; 30									PIR; 20	SON	NSH	CSC	ATL		POC; 26	ROA; 22			GLN; DNQ	DAY				TEX; 35	ROV	LVS; 38				34th	164	
2023	Emerling-Gase Motorsports	35	Ford					ATL; 18	COA															MCH; 34	IRC												34th	164	
2023	Emerling-Gase Motorsports	35	Toyota								MAR; 21	TAL																									34th	164	
2023	Emerling-Gase Motorsports	35	Chevy										DOV; 33	DAR; 21	CLT; 31						NHA; 14							DAR; 36	KAN	BRI; QL^{‡}				HOM; 25	MAR	PHO	34th	164	
2024	SS-Green Light Racing	07	Chevy	DAY; 17	ATL; 33	LVS; 28	PHO; 38	COA	RCH; 36	MAR	TEX; 33	TAL; 32	DOV; 28	DAR; 33	CLT; 30	PIR	SON	IOW; 23	NHA; 34	NSH; 38	CSC	POC; 32	IND	MCH; 22	DAY; 18	DAR	ATL	GLN	BRI	KAN; 30	TAL	ROV	LVS	HOM	MAR; 23	PHO; 28	35th	150	
2025	SS-Green Light Racing	07	Chevy	DAY; 10	ATL	COA	PHO	LVS; 28	HOM; 33	MAR	DAR	BRI	CAR; 19	TAL; 12	TEX	CLT	NSH	MXC	POC; 30	ATL	CSC	SON	DOV	IND	IOW; 30	GLN	DAY; 13	PIR	GTW	BRI	KAN	ROV	LVS	TAL	MAR	PHO; 35	88th	0^{1}	
2026	RSS Racing	38	Chevy	DAY; 13	ATL	COA	PHO	LVS	DAR	MAR	CAR	BRI	KAN	TAL; 16	TEX	GLN	DOV	CLT	NSH	POC; 31	COR	SON	CHI	ATL	IND	IOW	DAY	DAR	GTW	BRI	LVS	CLT	PHO	TAL; DNQ			78th	0^{1}	
2026	RSS Racing	38	Ford																																MAR; 37	HOM	78th	0^{1}	
^{†} – Qualified but replaced by Josh Williams · ^{‡} – Qualified but replaced by B. J. McLeod

==== Craftsman Truck Series ====
NASCAR Craftsman Truck Series results
Year	Team	No.	Make	1	2	3	4	5	6	7	8	9	10	11	12	13	14	15	16	17	18	19	20	21	22	23	24	25	NCTS	Pts	Ref
2017	Copp Motorsports	83	Chevy	DAY	ATL	MAR	KAN	CLT	DOV	TEX	GTW	IOW	KEN	ELD	POC	MCH	BRI	MSP	CHI	NHA; 23	LVS	TAL	MAR	TEX; 26	PHO	HOM			55th	25	
2025	Henderson Motorsports	75	Chevy	DAY	ATL	LVS	HOM	MAR	BRI	CAR	TEX	KAN	NWS; 19	CLT	NSH	MCH													38th	49	
2025	Spire Motorsports	07	Chevy														POC; 15	LRP	IRP	GLN	RCH	DAR	BRI						38th	49	
2025	Spire Motorsports	7	Chevy																					NHA; 28	ROV	TAL	MAR	PHO	38th	49	
2026	Team Reaume	22	Ford	DAY	ATL	STP	DAR	CAR	BRI	TEX	GLN	DOV	CLT	NSH	MCH	COR	LRP	NWS	IRP	RCH	NHA; 35	BRI	KAN	CLT	PHO	TAL	MAR	HOM	91st	2	

^{*} Season still in progress
^{1} Ineligible for series points

==== Whelen Modified Tour ====
NASCAR Whelen Modified Tour results
Year	Car owner	No.	Make	1	2	3	4	5	6	7	8	9	10	11	12	13	14	15	16	17	18	NWMTC	Pts	Ref
2011	Emerling Motorsports	07	Chevy	TMP; 10	STA; 23																	13th	1859	
2011	Emerling Motorsports	07	Ford			STA; 25	MND; 19	TMP; 30	NHA; 25	RIV; 8	STA; 17	NHA; 13	BRI; 5	DEL; 10	TMP; 12	LRP; 10	NHA; 17	STA; 23	TMP; 8			13th	1859	
2012	Emerling Motorsports	07	Chevy	TMP; 7	STA; 20		STA; 17	WFD; 21	NHA; 13	STA; 13	TMP; 12	BRI; 16		RIV; 20	NHA; 12	STA; 25	TMP; 8					14th	398	
2012	Emerling Motorsports	07	Ford			MND; 20																14th	398	
2012	Marcy Putnam	7	Chevy										TMP; 15									14th	398	
2013	Emerling Motorsports	07	Chevy	TMP; 13	STA; 11	STA; 24	WFD; 17	RIV; 26	NHA; 20	MND; 19	STA; 14	TMP	BRI; DNQ	RIV; 10	NHA; 5	STA; 19	TMP					21st	327	
2014	Emerling Motorsports	07	Chevy	TMP; 17	STA; 12	STA; 7	WFD; 5	RIV; 15	NHA; 20	MND; 7	STA; 19	TMP; 20	BRI; 9	NHA; 6	STA; 5	TMP; 11						10th	419	
2015	Emerling Motorsports	07	Chevy	TMP; 11	STA; 8	WFD; 7	STA; 9	TMP; 12	RIV; 16	NHA; 4	MND; 16	**STA**; 6	**TMP**; 7	BRI; 9	RIV; 13	NHA; 2	STA; 22	TMP; 6				5th	515	
2016	Emerling Motorsports	07	Chevy	TMP; 14	STA	WFD	STA	TMP; 4	RIV	NHA; 3	MND	STA	TMP	BRI; 4	RIV	OSW; 5	SEE	NHA; 6	STA	TMP		25th	228	
2017	Emerling Motorsports	07	Chevy	MYR	TMP; 6	STA	LGY	TMP	RIV	NHA; 31	STA	TMP	**BRI**; 1*	SEE	OSW; 18	RIV	NHA; 3	STA	TMP			28th	167	
2018	Emerling Motorsports	07	Chevy	MYR	TMP; 33	STA; 4	SEE	TMP	LGY	RIV	NHA; 9	STA	TMP	BRI; 4	OSW; 7	RIV	NHA; 2	STA	TMP			28th	207	
2019	Emerling Motorsports	07	Chevy	MYR; 4	SBO; 7	TMP; 4	STA; 7	WAL; 23	SEE; 9	TMP; 27	RIV; 7	NHA; 28	STA; 10	TMP; 8	OSW; 14	RIV; 5	NHA; 23	STA; 10	TMP; 36			8th	484	
2020	Emerling Motorsports	07	Chevy	JEN; 19	WMM; 15	WMM; 15	JEN; 12	MND; 17	TMP; 26	NHA; 11	STA	TMP; 9										16th	229	
2021	Emerling Motorsports	07	Chevy	MAR; 8	STA; 1	RIV; 2	JEN; 5	OSW; 3	RIV; 2	NHA; 13	NRP; 1	STA; 7	BEE; 3	OSW; 15	RCH; 25	RIV; 1*	STA; 3					2nd	543	
2022	Emerling Motorsports	07	Chevy	NSM; 9	RCH; 25	RIV; 2	LEE	JEN; 13	MND; 22	RIV	WAL; 3	NHA; 3	CLM	TMP; 9	LGY	OSW; 23	RIV; 2	TMP; 4	MAR; 34			11th	380	
2023	Emerling Motorsports	07	Chevy	NSM; 34	RCH; 5	MON; 10	RIV; 7	LEE	SEE	RIV	WAL	NHA; 5	LMP	THO; 7	LGY	OSW	MON	RIV			MAR; 3	17th	277	
2023	Joe Stearns	14	Chevy																NWS; 5	THO		17th	277	
2024	Rich Gautreau	1	Chevy	NSM; 4	RCH; 24	THO; 3	MON; 3	RIV; 9	SEE; 8	NHA; 4	MON; 3	LMP; 2	**THO**; 1**	OSW; 1	RIV; 4	MON; 1	THO; 7	NWS; 4	MAR; 10			3rd	635	
2025	Rich Gautreau	1	Chevy	NSM; 1	THO; 2	NWS; 28	SEE; 14	RIV; 3	WMM; 16	LMP; 2	**MON**; 2	MON; 8	THO; 1	RCH; 3	OSW; 3	NHA; 17	RIV; 13	THO; 8	MAR; 17			5th	584	
2026	USNEPower Motorsports	1	Chevy	NSM; 4	**MAR**; 6	THO; 13	SEE; 6	RIV; 5	OXF; 7	SEE; 3	CLM; 1*	WMM; 1*	MON; 1*	THO; 3	NHA; 30	STA; 5	OSW; 1*	RIV; 1*	THO; 3			1st	643	

==== Whelen Southern Modified Tour ====
NASCAR Whelen Southern Modified Tour results
Year	Car owner	No.	Make	1	2	3	4	5	6	7	8	9	10	11	12	13	14	NSWMTC	Pts	Ref
2011	Emerling Motorsports	07	Chevy	CRW; 13	**HCY**; 15*	SBO; 9	CRW; 19	CRW	BGS	BRI	CRW	LGY	THO	TRI	CRW	CLT	CRW	22nd	496	
2012	Emerling Motorsports	07	Chevy	CRW	CRW; 6	SBO	CRW	CRW	BGS	BRI	LGY	THO	CRW	CLT				36th	38	
2013	Emerling Motorsports	07	Chevy	CRW	SNM	SBO	CRW	CRW	BGS	BRI; DNQ	LGY; 6	CRW	CRW	SNM	CLT			30th	38	

=== ARCA Menards Series ===
(key) (Bold – Pole position awarded by qualifying time. Italics – Pole position earned by points standings or practice time. * – Most laps led. ** – All laps led.)

ARCA Menards Series results
Year	Team	No.	Make	1	2	3	4	5	6	7	8	9	10	11	12	13	14	15	16	17	18	19	20	AMSC	Pts	Ref
2023	Emerling-Gase Motorsports	53	Ford	DAY	PHO	TAL; 16	KAN	CLT	BLN	ELK	MOH	IOW	POC	MCH	IRP	GLN	ISF	MLW	DSF	KAN	BRI	SLM	TOL	97th	28	
2024	SS-Green Light Racing	08	Ford	DAY; 17	PHO	TAL	DOV	KAN	CLT	IOW	MOH	BLN	IRP	SLM	ELK	MCH	ISF	MLW	DSF	GLN	BRI	KAN	TOL	93rd	27	

=== SMART Modified Tour ===
SMART Modified Tour results
Year	Car owner	No.	Make	1	2	3	4	5	6	7	8	9	10	11	12	13	SMTC	Pts	Ref
2026	USNEPower Motorsports	1	N/A	FLO	AND	SBO; 23	DOM	HCY	WKS	FCR	CRW						26th	93	
2026	PSR Racing	17	N/A									PUL; 6	CAR	ROU	TRI; Wth	NWS; 6	26th	93	

Sporting positions
Preceded by Austin Beers	NASCAR Whelen Modified Tour Champion; 2026	Succeeded by Incumbent
