= 2023 ToyotaCare 250 =

7th race of the 2023 NASCAR Xfinity Series

Race details
- Race 7 of 33 of the 2023 NASCAR Xfinity Series
- Date: April 1, 2023
- Official name: 43rd Annual ToyotaCare 250
- Location: Richmond Raceway, Richmond, Virginia
- Course: Permanent racing facility
- Course length: 0.75 miles (1.21 km)
- Distance: 250 laps, 187 mi (301 km)
- Scheduled distance: 250 laps, 187 mi (301 km)
- Average speed: 86.884 mph (139.826 km/h)

Pole position
Driver	Justin Allgaier	JR Motorsports
- Grid positions set by competition-based formula

Most laps led
Driver	Chandler Smith	Kaulig Racing
- Laps: 83

Winner
No. 16	Chandler Smith	Kaulig Racing

Television in the United States
- Network: FS1
- Announcers: Adam Alexander, Kevin Harvick, and Joey Logano

Radio in the United States
- Radio: MRN

The 2023 ToyotaCare 250 was the 7th stock car race of the 2023 NASCAR Xfinity Series, the 43rd iteration of the event, and the first race of the Dash 4 Cash. The race was held on Saturday, April 1, 2023, in Richmond, Virginia at Richmond Raceway, a 0.75 miles (1.21 km) permanent tri-oval shaped racetrack. The race took the scheduled 250 laps to complete. Chandler Smith, driving for Kaulig Racing, would hold off John Hunter Nemechek in the final laps of the race, and earn his first career NASCAR Xfinity Series win. Smith would also dominate a portion of the race, leading 83 laps. To fill out the podium, Nemechek, driving for Joe Gibbs Racing, and Josh Berry, driving for JR Motorsports, would finish 2nd and 3rd, respectively.

This was also the first race of the Dash 4 Cash. Drivers eligible for the Dash 4 Cash were Sammy Smith, Justin Allgaier, Daniel Hemric, and Sam Mayer, after they were the highest finishing Xfinity regulars following the race at COTA. Allgaier, who finished the race in 13th, would claim the bonus cash after finishing ahead of Smith, Hemric, and Mayer.

== Background ==
Richmond Raceway (RR) is a 0.75 miles (1.21 km), D-shaped, asphalt race track located just outside Richmond, Virginia in unincorporated Henrico County. It hosts the NASCAR Cup Series, NASCAR Xfinity Series and the NASCAR Camping World Truck Series. Known as "America's premier short track", it has formerly hosted events such as the International Race of Champions, Denny Hamlin Short Track Showdown, and the USAC sprint car series. Due to Richmond Raceway's unique "D" shape which allows drivers to reach high speeds, Richmond has long been known as a short track that races like a superspeedway. With its multiple racing grooves, and proclivity for contact Richmond is a favorite among NASCAR drivers and fans.

=== Entry list ===
- (R) denotes rookie driver.
- (i) denotes driver who is ineligible for series driver points.

#	Driver	Team	Make
00	Cole Custer	Stewart-Haas Racing	Ford
1	Sam Mayer	JR Motorsports	Chevrolet
02	Blaine Perkins	Our Motorsports	Chevrolet
2	Sheldon Creed	Richard Childress Racing	Chevrolet
4	Garrett Smithley	JD Motorsports	Chevrolet
6	Brennan Poole	JD Motorsports	Chevrolet
07	Stefan Parsons	SS-Green Light Racing	Chevrolet
7	Justin Allgaier	JR Motorsports	Chevrolet
08	Gray Gaulding	SS-Green Light Racing	Ford
8	Josh Berry	JR Motorsports	Chevrolet
9	Brandon Jones	JR Motorsports	Chevrolet
10	Derek Kraus (i)	Kaulig Racing	Chevrolet
11	Daniel Hemric	Kaulig Racing	Chevrolet
16	Chandler Smith (R)	Kaulig Racing	Chevrolet
18	Sammy Smith (R)	Joe Gibbs Racing	Toyota
19	Joe Graf Jr.	Joe Gibbs Racing	Toyota
20	John Hunter Nemechek	Joe Gibbs Racing	Toyota
21	Austin Hill	Richard Childress Racing	Chevrolet
24	Connor Mosack (R)	Sam Hunt Racing	Toyota
25	Brett Moffitt	AM Racing	Ford
26	Kaz Grala	Sam Hunt Racing	Toyota
27	Jeb Burton	Jordan Anderson Racing	Chevrolet
28	Kyle Sieg	RSS Racing	Ford
31	Parker Retzlaff (R)	Jordan Anderson Racing	Chevrolet
35	Joey Gase	Emerling-Gase Motorsports	Toyota
38	Chris Hacker (i)	RSS Racing	Ford
39	Ryan Sieg	RSS Racing	Ford
43	Ryan Ellis	Alpha Prime Racing	Chevrolet
44	Jeffrey Earnhardt	Alpha Prime Racing	Chevrolet
45	Leland Honeyman	Alpha Prime Racing	Chevrolet
48	Parker Kligerman	Big Machine Racing	Chevrolet
51	Jeremy Clements	Jeremy Clements Racing	Chevrolet
53	Patrick Emerling	Emerling-Gase Motorsports	Ford
66	Mason Maggio (i)	MBM Motorsports	Toyota
74	Dawson Cram	CHK Racing	Chevrolet
78	Anthony Alfredo	B. J. McLeod Motorsports	Chevrolet
91	Alex Labbé	DGM Racing	Chevrolet
92	Josh Williams	DGM Racing	Chevrolet
96	Kyle Weatherman	FRS Racing	Chevrolet
98	Riley Herbst	Stewart-Haas Racing	Ford
Official entry list

== Starting lineup ==
Practice and qualifying was both scheduled to be held on Saturday, April 1, at 8:00 AM EST, and 8:30 AM EST, but were both cancelled due to constant rain showers. The starting lineup was determined by a performance-based metric system. As a result, Justin Allgaier, driving for JR Motorsports, earned the pole. Dawson Cram and Kyle Weatherman failed to qualify.

Pos.	#	Driver	Team	Make
1	7	Justin Allgaier	JR Motorsports	Chevrolet
2	18	Sammy Smith (R)	Joe Gibbs Racing	Toyota
3	1	Sam Mayer	JR Motorsports	Chevrolet
4	98	Riley Herbst	Stewart-Haas Racing	Ford
5	11	Daniel Hemric	Kaulig Racing	Chevrolet
6	2	Sheldon Creed	Richard Childress Racing	Chevrolet
7	8	Josh Berry	JR Motorsports	Chevrolet
8	16	Chandler Smith (R)	Kaulig Racing	Chevrolet
9	9	Brandon Jones	JR Motorsports	Chevrolet
10	20	John Hunter Nemechek	Joe Gibbs Racing	Toyota
11	10	Derek Kraus (i)	Kaulig Racing	Chevrolet
12	51	Jeremy Clements	Jeremy Clements Racing	Chevrolet
13	78	Anthony Alfredo	B. J. McLeod Motorsports	Chevrolet
14	31	Parker Retzlaff (R)	Jordan Anderson Racing	Chevrolet
15	19	Joe Graf Jr.	Joe Gibbs Racing	Toyota
16	27	Jeb Burton	Jordan Anderson Racing	Chevrolet
17	39	Ryan Sieg	RSS Racing	Ford
18	21	Austin Hill	Richard Childress Racing	Chevrolet
19	24	Connor Mosack (R)	Sam Hunt Racing	Toyota
20	48	Parker Kligerman	Big Machine Racing	Chevrolet
21	26	Kaz Grala	Sam Hunt Racing	Toyota
22	00	Cole Custer	Stewart-Haas Racing	Ford
23	43	Ryan Ellis	Alpha Prime Racing	Chevrolet
24	25	Brett Moffitt	AM Racing	Ford
25	28	Kyle Sieg	RSS Racing	Ford
26	92	Josh Williams	DGM Racing	Chevrolet
27	02	Blaine Perkins	Our Motorsports	Chevrolet
28	45	Leland Honeyman	Alpha Prime Racing	Chevrolet
29	38	Chris Hacker (i)	RSS Racing	Ford
30	6	Brennan Poole	JD Motorsports	Chevrolet
31	08	Gray Gaulding	SS-Green Light Racing	Ford
32	91	Alex Labbé	DGM Racing	Chevrolet
33	53	Patrick Emerling	Emerling-Gase Motorsports	Ford
Qualified by owner's points
34	44	Jeffrey Earnhardt	Alpha Prime Racing	Chevrolet
35	35	Joey Gase	Emerling-Gase Motorsports	Toyota
36	07	Stefan Parsons	SS-Green Light Racing	Chevrolet
37	4	Garrett Smithley	JD Motorsports	Chevrolet
38	66	Mason Maggio (i)	MBM Motorsports	Toyota
Failed to qualify
39	74	Dawson Cram	CHK Racing	Chevrolet
40	96	Kyle Weatherman	FRS Racing	Chevrolet
Official starting lineup

== Race results ==
Stage 1 Laps: 75

Pos.	#	Driver	Team	Make	Pts
1	16	Chandler Smith (R)	Kaulig Racing	Chevrolet	10
2	98	Riley Herbst	Stewart-Haas Racing	Ford	9
3	9	Brandon Jones	JR Motorsports	Chevrolet	8
4	8	Josh Berry	JR Motorsports	Chevrolet	7
5	00	Cole Custer	Stewart-Haas Racing	Ford	6
6	7	Justin Allgaier	JR Motorsports	Chevrolet	5
7	11	Daniel Hemric	Kaulig Racing	Chevrolet	4
8	2	Sheldon Creed	Richard Childress Racing	Chevrolet	3
9	39	Ryan Sieg	RSS Racing	Ford	2
10	1	Sam Mayer	JR Motorsports	Chevrolet	1

Stage 2 Laps: 75

Pos.	#	Driver	Team	Make	Pts
1	8	Josh Berry	JR Motorsports	Chevrolet	10
2	9	Brandon Jones	JR Motorsports	Chevrolet	9
3	98	Riley Herbst	Stewart-Haas Racing	Ford	8
4	16	Chandler Smith (R)	Kaulig Racing	Chevrolet	7
5	00	Cole Custer	Stewart-Haas Racing	Ford	6
6	26	Kaz Grala	Sam Hunt Racing	Toyota	5
7	20	John Hunter Nemechek	Joe Gibbs Racing	Toyota	4
8	48	Parker Kligerman	Big Machine Racing	Chevrolet	3
9	7	Justin Allgaier	JR Motorsports	Chevrolet	2
10	2	Sheldon Creed	Richard Childress Racing	Chevrolet	1

Stage 3 Laps: 100

Fin	St	#	Driver	Team	Make	Laps	Led	Status	Pts
1	8	16	Chandler Smith (R)	Kaulig Racing	Chevrolet	250	83	Running	57
2	10	20	John Hunter Nemechek	Joe Gibbs Racing	Toyota	250	11	Running	39
3	7	8	Josh Berry	JR Motorsports	Chevrolet	250	63	Running	51
4	21	26	Kaz Grala	Sam Hunt Racing	Toyota	250	0	Running	38
5	22	00	Cole Custer	Stewart-Haas Racing	Ford	250	0	Running	44
6	6	2	Sheldon Creed	Richard Childress Racing	Chevrolet	250	0	Running	35
7	17	39	Ryan Sieg	RSS Racing	Ford	250	0	Running	32
8	20	48	Parker Kligerman	Big Machine Racing	Chevrolet	250	0	Running	32
9	18	21	Austin Hill	Richard Childress Racing	Chevrolet	250	0	Running	28
10	11	10	Derek Kraus (i)	Kaulig Racing	Chevrolet	250	0	Running	0
11	32	91	Alex Labbé	DGM Racing	Chevrolet	250	0	Running	26
12	16	27	Jeb Burton	Jordan Anderson Racing	Chevrolet	250	0	Running	25
13	1	7	Justin Allgaier	JR Motorsports	Chevrolet	250	2	Running	31
14	29	38	Chris Hacker (i)	RSS Racing	Ford	250	0	Running	0
15	23	43	Ryan Ellis	Alpha Prime Racing	Chevrolet	250	0	Running	22
16	14	31	Parker Retzlaff (R)	Jordan Anderson Racing	Chevrolet	250	0	Running	21
17	3	1	Sam Mayer	JR Motorsports	Chevrolet	250	0	Running	21
18	34	44	Jeffrey Earnhardt	Alpha Prime Racing	Chevrolet	250	0	Running	19
19	2	18	Sammy Smith (R)	Joe Gibbs Racing	Toyota	250	40	Running	18
20	25	28	Kyle Sieg	RSS Racing	Ford	250	0	Running	17
21	9	9	Brandon Jones	JR Motorsports	Chevrolet	250	24	Running	33
22	24	25	Brett Moffitt	AM Racing	Ford	250	0	Running	15
23	4	98	Riley Herbst	Stewart-Haas Racing	Ford	250	27	Running	31
24	5	11	Daniel Hemric	Kaulig Racing	Chevrolet	249	0	Running	17
25	28	45	Leland Honeyman	Alpha Prime Racing	Chevrolet	249	0	Running	12
26	27	02	Blaine Perkins	Our Motorsports	Chevrolet	248	0	Running	11
27	35	35	Joey Gase	Emerling-Gase Motorsports	Toyota	248	0	Running	10
28	19	24	Connor Mosack (R)	Sam Hunt Racing	Toyota	248	0	Running	9
29	33	53	Patrick Emerling	Emerling-Gase Motorsports	Ford	248	0	Running	8
30	37	4	Garrett Smithley	JD Motorsports	Chevrolet	248	0	Running	7
31	38	66	Mason Maggio (i)	MBM Motorsports	Toyota	247	0	Running	0
32	36	07	Stefan Parsons	SS-Green Light Racing	Chevrolet	247	0	Running	5
33	26	92	Josh Williams	DGM Racing	Chevrolet	247	0	Running	4
34	30	6	Brennan Poole	JD Motorsports	Chevrolet	247	0	Running	3
35	31	08	Gray Gaulding	SS-Green Light Racing	Ford	245	0	Running	2
36	12	51	Jeremy Clements	Jeremy Clements Racing	Chevrolet	243	0	Running	1
37	15	19	Joe Graf Jr.	Joe Gibbs Racing	Toyota	236	0	Running	1
38	13	78	Anthony Alfredo	B. J. McLeod Motorsports	Chevrolet	144	0	Accident	1
Official race results

== Standings after the race ==
Drivers' Championship standings

	Pos	Driver	Points
	1	Austin Hill	277
	2	Riley Herbst	265 (-12)
	3	John Hunter Nemechek	259 (–18)
1	4	Chandler Smith	253 (–24)
4	5	Josh Berry	234 (–43)
2	6	Justin Allgaier	231 (–46)
1	7	Sheldon Creed	219 (–58)
2	8	Sam Mayer	208 (–69)
2	9	Sammy Smith	203 (–74)
2	10	Cole Custer	196 (–81)
1	11	Daniel Hemric	193 (–84)
1	12	Parker Kligerman	188 (–89)
Official driver's standings

- Note: Only the first 12 positions are included for the driver standings.

Previous race: 2023 Pit Boss 250	NASCAR Xfinity Series; 2023 season	Next race: 2023 Call 811.com Before You Dig 250
