= 2023 Call 811.com Before You Dig 250 =

8th race of the 2023 NASCAR Xfinity Series

Race details
- Race 8 of 33 of the 2023 NASCAR Xfinity Series
- Date: April 15, 2023
- Official name: 16th Annual Call 811.com Before You Dig 250
- Location: Martinsville Speedway, Ridgeway, Virginia
- Course: Permanent racing facility
- Course length: 0.526 miles (0.847 km)
- Distance: 250 laps, 131 mi (211 km)
- Scheduled distance: 250 laps, 131 mi (211 km)
- Average speed: 59.398 mph (95.592 km/h)

Pole position
Driver	Cole Custer	Stewart-Haas Racing
- Time: 20.057

Most laps led
Driver	John Hunter Nemechek	Joe Gibbs Racing
- Laps: 198

Winner
No. 20	John Hunter Nemechek	Joe Gibbs Racing

Television in the United States
- Network: FS1
- Announcers: Adam Alexander, Joey Logano, and Brad Keselowski

Radio in the United States
- Radio: MRN

The 2023 Call 811.com Before You Dig 250 was the 8th stock car race of the 2023 NASCAR Xfinity Series, and the 16th iteration of the event. The race was held on Saturday, April 15, 2023, in Ridgeway, Virginia at Martinsville Speedway, a 0.526 miles (0.847 km) permanent paper-clip shaped racetrack. The race took the scheduled 250 laps to complete. John Hunter Nemechek, driving for Joe Gibbs Racing, would put on a dominating performance, winning both stages and leading 198 laps, earning his fourth career NASCAR Xfinity Series win, and his second of the season; during his celebratory burnout, the rear of his car ignited fire. To fill out the podium, Sammy Smith, driving for Joe Gibbs Racing, and Cole Custer, driving for Stewart-Haas Racing, would finish 2nd and 3rd, respectively.

== Background ==
Martinsville Speedway is a NASCAR-owned stock car racing track located in Henry County, in Ridgeway, Virginia, just to the south of Martinsville. At 0.526 miles (0.847 km) in length, it is the shortest track in the NASCAR Cup Series. The track was also one of the first paved oval tracks in NASCAR, being built in 1947 by H. Clay Earles. It is also the only remaining race track on the NASCAR circuit since its beginning in 1948.

=== Entry list ===
- (R) denotes rookie driver.
- (i) denotes driver who is ineligible for series driver points.

#	Driver	Team	Make
00	Cole Custer	Stewart-Haas Racing	Ford
1	Sam Mayer	JR Motorsports	Chevrolet
02	Blaine Perkins	Our Motorsports	Chevrolet
2	Sheldon Creed	Richard Childress Racing	Chevrolet
4	Garrett Smithley	JD Motorsports	Chevrolet
6	Brennan Poole	JD Motorsports	Chevrolet
07	Dawson Cram	SS-Green Light Racing	Chevrolet
7	Justin Allgaier	JR Motorsports	Chevrolet
08	Gray Gaulding	SS-Green Light Racing	Ford
8	Josh Berry	JR Motorsports	Chevrolet
9	Brandon Jones	JR Motorsports	Chevrolet
10	Derek Kraus	Kaulig Racing	Chevrolet
11	Daniel Hemric	Kaulig Racing	Chevrolet
16	Chandler Smith (R)	Kaulig Racing	Chevrolet
18	Sammy Smith (R)	Joe Gibbs Racing	Toyota
19	Ryan Truex	Joe Gibbs Racing	Toyota
20	John Hunter Nemechek	Joe Gibbs Racing	Toyota
21	Austin Hill	Richard Childress Racing	Chevrolet
24	Connor Mosack (R)	Sam Hunt Racing	Toyota
25	Brett Moffitt	AM Racing	Ford
26	Kaz Grala	Sam Hunt Racing	Toyota
27	Jeb Burton	Jordan Anderson Racing	Chevrolet
28	Kyle Sieg	RSS Racing	Ford
31	Parker Retzlaff (R)	Jordan Anderson Racing	Chevrolet
35	Patrick Emerling	Emerling-Gase Motorsports	Toyota
38	Joe Graf Jr.	RSS Racing	Ford
39	Ryan Sieg	RSS Racing	Ford
43	Ryan Ellis	Alpha Prime Racing	Chevrolet
44	Jeffrey Earnhardt	Alpha Prime Racing	Chevrolet
45	Leland Honeyman	Alpha Prime Racing	Chevrolet
48	Parker Kligerman	Big Machine Racing	Chevrolet
51	Jeremy Clements	Jeremy Clements Racing	Chevrolet
53	Matt Mills (i)	Emerling-Gase Motorsports	Ford
66	Chad Finchum	MBM Motorsports	Ford
74	Kaden Honeycutt (i)	CHK Racing	Chevrolet
78	Anthony Alfredo	B. J. McLeod Motorsports	Chevrolet
91	Alex Labbé	DGM Racing	Chevrolet
92	Josh Williams	DGM Racing	Chevrolet
96	Kyle Weatherman	FRS Racing	Chevrolet
98	Riley Herbst	Stewart-Haas Racing	Ford
Official entry list

== Practice ==
For practice, drivers will be separated into two groups, Group A and B. Both sessions will be 15 minutes long, and will be held on Friday, April 14, at 5:00 PM EST. Cole Custer, driving for Stewart-Haas Racing, was the fastest driver in total, with a lap of 20.594, and an average speed of 91.949 mph (147.978 km/h).

Pos.	#	Driver	Team	Make	Time	Speed
1	00	Cole Custer	Stewart-Haas Racing	Ford	20.594	91.949
2	18	Sammy Smith (R)	Joe Gibbs Racing	Toyota	20.614	91.860
3	11	Daniel Hemric	Kaulig Racing	Chevrolet	20.646	91.718
Full practice results

== Qualifying ==
Qualifying was held on Friday, April 14, at 5:35 PM EST. Since Martinsville Speedway is a short track, the qualifying system used is a single-car, two-lap system with only one round. In that round, whoever sets the fastest time will win the pole. Cole Custer, driving for Stewart-Haas Racing, would score the pole for the race, with a lap of 20.057, and an average speed of 94.411 mph (151.940 km/h).

Pos.	#	Driver	Team	Make	Time	Speed
1	00	Cole Custer	Stewart-Haas Racing	Ford	20.057	94.411
2	20	John Hunter Nemechek	Joe Gibbs Racing	Toyota	20.074	94.331
3	2	Sheldon Creed	Richard Childress Racing	Chevrolet	20.094	94.237
4	31	Parker Retzlaff (R)	Jordan Anderson Racing	Chevrolet	20.136	94.041
5	1	Sam Mayer	JR Motorsports	Chevrolet	20.186	93.808
6	8	Josh Berry	JR Motorsports	Chevrolet	20.191	93.784
7	18	Sammy Smith (R)	Joe Gibbs Racing	Toyota	20.197	93.756
8	7	Justin Allgaier	JR Motorsports	Chevrolet	20.198	93.752
9	98	Riley Herbst	Stewart-Haas Racing	Ford	20.207	93.710
10	9	Brandon Jones	JR Motorsports	Chevrolet	20.211	93.692
11	16	Chandler Smith (R)	Kaulig Racing	Chevrolet	20.223	93.636
12	10	Derek Kraus	Kaulig Racing	Chevrolet	20.272	93.410
13	11	Daniel Hemric	Kaulig Racing	Chevrolet	20.281	93.368
14	19	Ryan Truex	Joe Gibbs Racing	Toyota	20.290	93.327
15	21	Austin Hill	Richard Childress Racing	Chevrolet	20.296	93.299
16	25	Brett Moffitt	AM Racing	Ford	20.309	93.239
17	39	Ryan Sieg	RSS Racing	Ford	20.333	93.129
18	24	Connor Mosack (R)	Sam Hunt Racing	Toyota	20.369	92.965
19	26	Kaz Grala	Sam Hunt Racing	Toyota	20.402	92.814
20	92	Josh Williams	DGM Racing	Chevrolet	20.439	92.646
21	48	Parker Kligerman	Big Machine Racing	Chevrolet	20.452	92.588
22	51	Jeremy Clements	Jeremy Clements Racing	Chevrolet	20.519	92.285
23	02	Blaine Perkins	Our Motorsports	Chevrolet	20.533	92.222
24	91	Alex Labbé	DGM Racing	Chevrolet	20.559	92.106
25	44	Jeffrey Earnhardt	Alpha Prime Racing	Chevrolet	20.577	92.025
26	53	Matt Mills (i)	Emerling-Gase Motorsports	Ford	20.578	92.021
27	96	Kyle Weatherman	FRS Racing	Chevrolet	20.597	91.936
28	28	Kyle Sieg	RSS Racing	Ford	20.600	91.922
29	07	Dawson Cram	SS-Green Light Racing	Chevrolet	20.662	91.647
30	45	Leland Honeyman	Alpha Prime Racing	Chevrolet	20.665	91.633
31	27	Jeb Burton	Jordan Anderson Racing	Chevrolet	20.666	91.629
32	6	Brennan Poole	JD Motorsports	Chevrolet	20.686	91.540
33	74	Kaden Honeycutt (i)	CHK Racing	Chevrolet	20.687	91.536
Qualified by owner's points
34	38	Joe Graf Jr.	RSS Racing	Ford	20.713	91.421
35	43	Ryan Ellis	Alpha Prime Racing	Chevrolet	20.720	91.390
36	35	Patrick Emerling	Emerling-Gase Motorsports	Toyota	20.887	90.659
37	08	Gray Gaulding	SS-Green Light Racing	Ford	21.210	89.279
38	78	Anthony Alfredo	B. J. McLeod Motorsports	Chevrolet	–	–
Failed to qualify
39	4	Garrett Smithley	JD Motorsports	Chevrolet	20.758	91.223
40	66	Chad Finchum	MBM Motorsports	Ford	20.762	91.205
Official qualifying results
Official starting lineup

== Race results ==
Stage 1 Laps: 60

Pos.	#	Driver	Team	Make	Pts
1	20	John Hunter Nemechek	Joe Gibbs Racing	Toyota	10
2	18	Sammy Smith (R)	Joe Gibbs Racing	Toyota	9
3	00	Cole Custer	Stewart-Haas Racing	Ford	8
4	1	Sam Mayer	JR Motorsports	Chevrolet	7
5	98	Riley Herbst	Stewart-Haas Racing	Ford	6
6	7	Justin Allgaier	JR Motorsports	Chevrolet	5
7	11	Daniel Hemric	Kaulig Racing	Chevrolet	4
8	16	Chandler Smith (R)	Kaulig Racing	Chevrolet	3
9	31	Parker Retzlaff (R)	Jordan Anderson Racing	Chevrolet	2
10	9	Brandon Jones	JR Motorsports	Chevrolet	1

Stage 2 Laps: 60

Pos.	#	Driver	Team	Make	Pts
1	20	John Hunter Nemechek	Joe Gibbs Racing	Toyota	10
2	8	Josh Berry	JR Motorsports	Chevrolet	9
3	00	Cole Custer	Stewart-Haas Racing	Ford	8
4	18	Sammy Smith (R)	Joe Gibbs Racing	Toyota	7
5	11	Daniel Hemric	Kaulig Racing	Chevrolet	6
6	9	Brandon Jones	JR Motorsports	Chevrolet	5
7	19	Ryan Truex	Joe Gibbs Racing	Toyota	4
8	98	Riley Herbst	Stewart-Haas Racing	Ford	3
9	16	Chandler Smith (R)	Kaulig Racing	Chevrolet	2
10	10	Derek Kraus	Kaulig Racing	Chevrolet	1

Stage 3 Laps: 130

Fin	St	#	Driver	Team	Make	Laps	Led	Status	Pts
1	2	20	John Hunter Nemechek	Joe Gibbs Racing	Toyota	250	198	Running	60
2	7	18	Sammy Smith (R)	Joe Gibbs Racing	Toyota	250	6	Running	51
3	1	00	Cole Custer	Stewart-Haas Racing	Ford	250	5	Running	50
4	6	8	Josh Berry	JR Motorsports	Chevrolet	250	27	Running	42
5	10	9	Brandon Jones	JR Motorsports	Chevrolet	250	0	Running	38
6	8	7	Justin Allgaier	JR Motorsports	Chevrolet	250	6	Running	36
7	13	11	Daniel Hemric	Kaulig Racing	Chevrolet	250	0	Running	40
8	12	10	Derek Kraus	Kaulig Racing	Chevrolet	250	0	Running	30
9	16	25	Brett Moffitt	AM Racing	Ford	250	0	Running	28
10	11	16	Chandler Smith (R)	Kaulig Racing	Chevrolet	250	0	Running	32
11	4	31	Parker Retzlaff (R)	Jordan Anderson Racing	Chevrolet	250	0	Running	28
12	14	19	Ryan Truex	Joe Gibbs Racing	Toyota	250	0	Running	29
13	23	02	Blaine Perkins	Our Motorsports	Chevrolet	250	0	Running	24
14	31	27	Jeb Burton	Jordan Anderson Racing	Chevrolet	250	0	Running	23
15	19	26	Kaz Grala	Sam Hunt Racing	Toyota	250	0	Running	22
16	15	21	Austin Hill	Richard Childress Racing	Chevrolet	250	8	Running	21
17	21	48	Parker Kligerman	Big Machine Racing	Chevrolet	250	0	Running	20
18	17	39	Ryan Sieg	RSS Racing	Ford	250	0	Running	19
19	20	92	Josh Williams	DGM Racing	Chevrolet	250	0	Running	18
20	25	44	Jeffrey Earnhardt	Alpha Prime Racing	Chevrolet	250	0	Running	17
21	36	35	Patrick Emerling	Emerling-Gase Motorsports	Toyota	250	0	Running	16
22	26	53	Matt Mills (i)	Emerling-Gase Motorsports	Ford	250	0	Running	0
23	37	08	Gray Gaulding	SS-Green Light Racing	Ford	250	0	Running	14
24	38	78	Anthony Alfredo	B. J. McLeod Motorsports	Chevrolet	250	0	Running	13
25	30	45	Leland Honeyman	Alpha Prime Racing	Chevrolet	250	0	Running	12
26	24	91	Alex Labbé	DGM Racing	Chevrolet	250	0	Running	11
27	3	2	Sheldon Creed	Richard Childress Racing	Chevrolet	250	0	Running	10
28	35	43	Ryan Ellis	Alpha Prime Racing	Chevrolet	249	0	Running	9
29	32	6	Brennan Poole	JD Motorsports	Chevrolet	246	0	Running	8
30	9	98	Riley Herbst	Stewart-Haas Racing	Ford	222	0	Accident	16
31	5	1	Sam Mayer	JR Motorsports	Chevrolet	221	0	Accident	13
32	22	51	Jeremy Clements	Jeremy Clements Racing	Chevrolet	210	0	Accident	5
33	18	24	Connor Mosack (R)	Sam Hunt Racing	Toyota	205	0	Running	4
34	27	96	Kyle Weatherman	FRS Racing	Chevrolet	198	0	Suspension	3
35	28	28	Kyle Sieg	RSS Racing	Ford	145	0	Accident	2
36	29	07	Dawson Cram	SS-Green Light Racing	Chevrolet	143	0	Accident	1
37	34	38	Joe Graf Jr.	RSS Racing	Ford	133	0	Accident	1
38	33	74	Kaden Honeycutt (i)	CHK Racing	Chevrolet	83	0	Engine	0
Official race results

== Standings after the race ==
Drivers' Championship standings

	Pos	Driver	Points
2	1	John Hunter Nemechek	319
1	2	Austin Hill	298 (-21)
1	3	Chandler Smith	285 (–34)
2	4	Riley Herbst	281 (–38)
	5	Josh Berry	276 (–43)
	6	Justin Allgaier	267 (–52)
2	7	Sammy Smith	254 (–65)
2	8	Cole Custer	246 (–73)
2	9	Daniel Hemric	233 (–86)
3	10	Sheldon Creed	229 (–90)
3	11	Sam Mayer	221 (–98)
	12	Parker Kligerman	208 (–111)
Official driver's standings

- Note: Only the first 12 positions are included for the driver standings.

Previous race: 2023 ToyotaCare 250	NASCAR Xfinity Series; 2023 season	Next race: 2023 Ag-Pro 300
