= FRS Racing =

American stock car racing team

- Owner: Collin Fern
- Base: Welcome, North Carolina
- Series: NASCAR Xfinity Series
- Race drivers: NASCAR Xfinity Series: 96. Kyle Weatherman, Max McLaughlin (part-time)
- Manufacturer: Chevrolet
- Opened: 2023

Career
- Races competed: Total: 2 NASCAR Xfinity Series: 2
- Drivers' Championships: Total: 0 NASCAR Xfinity Series: 0
- Race victories: Total: 0 NASCAR Xfinity Series: 0
- Pole positions: Total: 0 NASCAR Xfinity Series: 0

FRS Racing was an American stock car racing team that competed in the NASCAR Xfinity Series. The team was founded in 2023 by former Brandonbilt Motorsports technical director Collin Fern, and they fielded the No. 96 Chevrolet Camaro part-time for Kyle Weatherman and Max McLaughlin. The team had a technical alliance with Richard Childress Racing, who built their cars and engines.

== History ==
On February 10, 2023, TobyChristie.com reported that former Brandonbilt Motorsports technical director, Collin Fern, announced that he will be forming his own team, FRS Racing, which will compete in a partial schedule for the 2023 NASCAR Xfinity Series season, and hopes to go full-time in 2024. The team would have a technical alliance with Richard Childress Racing. They shared a shop with NASCAR Craftsman Truck Series team Young's Motorsports.

== NASCAR Xfinity Series ==
=== Car No. 96 history ===
The team planned to make their Xfinity Series debut at Richmond Raceway in April, as well as select races throughout the season with the No. 96 car. On February 28, the team announced that dirt track racer Max McLaughlin would drive their No. 96 car at Watkins Glen, making his debut in the Xfinity Series. On March 26, it was announced that Kyle Weatherman would drive the 96 car in the team's debut at Richmond, with sponsorship from BrewHaha Brewing Company. However, after qualifying got rained out, the team would fail to qualify. On April 10, 2023, the team announced that they would try to make their debut at Martinsville Speedway, with Weatherman behind the wheel.

==== Car No. 96 results ====
NASCAR Xfinity Series results
| Year | Driver | No. | Make | 1 | 2 | 3 | 4 | 5 | 6 | 7 | 8 | 9 | 10 | 11 | 12 | 13 | 14 | 15 | 16 | 17 | 18 | 19 | 20 | 21 | 22 | 23 | 24 | 25 | 26 | 27 | 28 | 29 | 30 | 31 | 32 | 33 | NXSC | Pts | Ref |
|---|---|---|---|---|---|---|---|---|---|---|---|---|---|---|---|---|---|---|---|---|---|---|---|---|---|---|---|---|---|---|---|---|---|---|---|---|---|---|---|
| 2023 | Kyle Weatherman | 96 | Chevy | DAY | CAL | LVS | PHO | ATL | COA | RCH; DNQ | MAR; 34 | TAL | DOV | DAR | CLT | PIR | SON | NSH | CSC | ATL | NHA | POC | ROA | MCH | IRC | | | | | | | | | | | | 50th | 6 | |
| 2023 | Max McLaughlin | 96 | Chevy | | | | | | | | | | | | | | | | | | | | | | | GLN; 34 | DAY | DAR | KAN | BRI | TEX | ROV | LVS | HOM | MAR | PHO | 50th | 6 | |
