= 2023 Shriners Children's 200 at The Glen =

23rd race of the 2023 NASCAR Xfinity Series

Race details
- Race 23 of 33 of the 2023 NASCAR Xfinity Series
- Date: August 19, 2023
- Official name: 28th Annual Shriners Children's 200 at The Glen
- Location: Watkins Glen International, Watkins Glen, New York
- Course: Permanent racing facility
- Course length: 2.454 miles (3.949 km)
- Distance: 86 laps, 210 mi (338 km)
- Scheduled distance: 82 laps, 201 mi (323 km)
- Average speed: 86.857 mph (139.783 km/h)

Pole position
Driver	Ty Gibbs	Joe Gibbs Racing
- Time: 1:10.549

Most laps led
Driver	Ty Gibbs	Joe Gibbs Racing
- Laps: 70

Winner
No. 1	Sam Mayer	JR Motorsports

Television in the United States
- Network: USA
- Announcers: Rick Allen, Steve Letarte (booth), Mike Bagley (Esses), Dale Earnhardt Jr. (Turn 5) and Jeff Burton (Turns 6–7)

Radio in the United States
- Radio: MRN

The 2023 Shriners Children's 200 at The Glen was the 23rd stock car race of the 2023 NASCAR Xfinity Series, and the 28th iteration of the event. The race was held on Saturday, August 19, 2023, in Watkins Glen, New York at Watkins Glen International, a 2.454 miles (3.949 km) permanent road course. The race was originally scheduled to be contested over 82 laps, but was extended to 86 laps due to a NASCAR overtime finish. In a wild overtime finish, Sam Mayer, driving for JR Motorsports, would spin race-leader Ty Gibbs on the final restart, and held off Sheldon Creed on the final lap to earn his second career NASCAR Xfinity Series win, and his second of the season. Gibbs had dominated the entire race, leading a race-high 70 laps. After spinning, he would end up finishing 17th. To fill out the podium, Creed, driving for Richard Childress Racing, and Parker Kligerman, driving for Big Machine Racing, would finish 2nd and 3rd, respectively.

After the race, NASCAR was later criticized due to the amount of oil and speedy dry on the racetrack from the previous caution, causing numerous drivers to spin or get loose in the final two laps, which included Josh Berry and Sammy Smith, after both of them spun coming to the white flag.

== Background ==
Watkins Glen International (nicknamed "The Glen") is an automobile race track located in Watkins Glen, New York at the southern tip of Seneca Lake. It was long known around the world as the home of the Formula One United States Grand Prix, which it hosted for twenty consecutive years (1961–1980), but the site has been home to road racing of nearly every class, including the World Sportscar Championship, Trans-Am, Can-Am, NASCAR Cup Series, the International Motor Sports Association and the IndyCar Series.

Initially, public roads in the village were used for the race course. In 1956 a permanent circuit for the race was built. In 1968 the race was extended to six hours, becoming the 6 Hours of Watkins Glen. The circuit's current layout has more or less been the same since 1971, although a chicane was installed at the uphill Esses in 1975 to slow cars through these corners, where there was a fatality during practice at the 1973 United States Grand Prix. The chicane was removed in 1985, but another chicane called the "Inner Loop" was installed in 1992 after J.D. McDuffie's fatal accident during the previous year's NASCAR Winston Cup event.

The circuit is known as the Mecca of North American road racing and is a very popular venue among fans and drivers. The facility is currently owned by International Speedway Corporation.

=== Entry list ===
- (R) denotes rookie driver.
- (i) denotes driver who is ineligible for series driver points.

#	Driver	Team	Make
00	Cole Custer	Stewart-Haas Racing	Ford
1	Sam Mayer	JR Motorsports	Chevrolet
02	Blaine Perkins (R)	Our Motorsports	Chevrolet
2	Sheldon Creed	Richard Childress Racing	Chevrolet
4	Kyle Weatherman	JD Motorsports	Chevrolet
6	Brennan Poole	JD Motorsports	Chevrolet
07	Josh Bilicki	SS-Green Light Racing	Ford
7	Justin Allgaier	JR Motorsports	Chevrolet
08	Alex Labbé	SS-Green Light Racing	Chevrolet
8	Josh Berry	JR Motorsports	Chevrolet
9	Brandon Jones	JR Motorsports	Chevrolet
10	Kyle Busch (i)	Kaulig Racing	Chevrolet
11	Daniel Hemric	Kaulig Racing	Chevrolet
16	Chandler Smith (R)	Kaulig Racing	Chevrolet
17	Alex Bowman (i)	Hendrick Motorsports	Chevrolet
18	Sammy Smith (R)	Joe Gibbs Racing	Toyota
19	Ty Gibbs (i)	Joe Gibbs Racing	Toyota
20	John Hunter Nemechek	Joe Gibbs Racing	Toyota
21	Austin Hill	Richard Childress Racing	Chevrolet
24	Connor Mosack (R)	Sam Hunt Racing	Toyota
25	Brett Moffitt	AM Racing	Ford
26	Kaz Grala	Sam Hunt Racing	Toyota
27	Jeb Burton	Jordan Anderson Racing	Chevrolet
28	Kyle Sieg	RSS Racing	Ford
31	Parker Retzlaff (R)	Jordan Anderson Racing	Chevrolet
35	Stanton Barrett	Emerling-Gase Motorsports	Toyota
38	Joe Graf Jr.	RSS Racing	Ford
39	Ryan Sieg	RSS Racing	Ford
43	Ryan Ellis	Alpha Prime Racing	Chevrolet
44	Stefan Parsons	Alpha Prime Racing	Chevrolet
45	Sage Karam	Alpha Prime Racing	Chevrolet
48	Parker Kligerman	Big Machine Racing	Chevrolet
51	Jeremy Clements	Jeremy Clements Racing	Chevrolet
53	Patrick Emerling	Emerling-Gase Motorsports	Chevrolet
74	Casey Carden (i)	CHK Racing	Chevrolet
78	Anthony Alfredo	B. J. McLeod Motorsports	Chevrolet
91	Ross Chastain (i)	DGM Racing	Chevrolet
92	Josh Williams	DGM Racing	Chevrolet
96	Max McLaughlin	FRS Racing	Chevrolet
98	Riley Herbst	Stewart-Haas Racing	Ford
Official entry list

== Practice ==
The first and only practice session was held on Saturday, August 19, at 10:30 AM EST, and would last for 20 minutes. Justin Allgaier, driving for JR Motorsports, would set the fastest time in the session, with a lap of 1:11.800, and an average speed of 122.841 mph (197.693 km/h).

Pos.	#	Driver	Team	Make	Time	Speed
1	7	Justin Allgaier	JR Motorsports	Chevrolet	1:11.800	122.841
2	10	Kyle Busch (i)	Kaulig Racing	Chevrolet	1:12.368	121.877
3	21	Austin Hill	Richard Childress Racing	Chevrolet	1:12.441	121.754
Full practice results

== Qualifying ==
Qualifying was held on Saturday, August 19, at 11:00 AM EST. Since Watkins Glen International is a road course, the qualifying system is a two group system, with two rounds. Drivers will be separated into two groups, Group A and Group B. Each driver will have multiple laps to set a time. The fastest 5 drivers from each group will advance to the final round. The fastest driver to set a time in that round will win the pole. Ty Gibbs, driving for Joe Gibbs Racing, would score the pole for the race, with a lap of 1:10.549, and an average speed of 125.019 mph (201.199 km/h).

Pos.	#	Driver	Team	Make	Time (R1)	Speed (R1)	Time (R2)	Speed (R2)
1	19	Ty Gibbs (i)	Joe Gibbs Racing	Toyota	1:10.758	124.650	1:10.549	125.019
2	17	Alex Bowman (i)	Hendrick Motorsports	Chevrolet	1:11.011	124.206	1:10.718	124.721
3	7	Justin Allgaier	JR Motorsports	Chevrolet	1:10.761	124.645	1:10.861	124.469
4	00	Cole Custer	Stewart-Haas Racing	Ford	1:11.601	123.183	1:11.054	124.131
5	1	Sam Mayer	JR Motorsports	Chevrolet	1:11.495	123.365	1:11.427	123.483
6	11	Daniel Hemric	Kaulig Racing	Chevrolet	1:11.413	123.507	1:11.499	123.358
7	8	Josh Berry	JR Motorsports	Chevrolet	1:11.300	123.703	1:11.517	123.327
8	10	Kyle Busch (i)	Kaulig Racing	Chevrolet	1:11.603	123.179	1:11.603	123.179
9	18	Sammy Smith (R)	Joe Gibbs Racing	Toyota	1:11.567	123.241	1:11.704	123.006
10	98	Riley Herbst	Stewart-Haas Racing	Ford	1:11.356	123.606	1:11.860	122.739
Eliminated from Round 1
11	21	Austin Hill	Richard Childress Racing	Chevrolet	1:11.508	123.343	—	—
12	20	John Hunter Nemechek	Joe Gibbs Racing	Toyota	1:11.632	123.129	—	—
13	2	Sheldon Creed	Richard Childress Racing	Chevrolet	1:11.655	123.090	—	—
14	48	Parker Kligerman	Big Machine Racing	Chevrolet	1:11.791	122.857	—	—
15	26	Kaz Grala	Sam Hunt Racing	Toyota	1:11.807	122.829	—	—
16	51	Jeremy Clements	Jeremy Clements Racing	Chevrolet	1:11.823	122.802	—	—
17	91	Ross Chastain (i)	DGM Racing	Chevrolet	1:11.916	122.643	—	—
18	16	Chandler Smith (R)	Kaulig Racing	Chevrolet	1:12.144	122.255	—	—
19	24	Connor Mosack (R)	Sam Hunt Racing	Toyota	1:12.206	122.151	—	—
20	25	Brett Moffitt	AM Racing	Ford	1:12.330	121.941	—	—
21	45	Sage Karam	Alpha Prime Racing	Chevrolet	1:12.510	121.638	—	—
22	08	Alex Labbé	SS-Green Light Racing	Ford	1:12.521	121.620	—	—
23	44	Stefan Parsons	Alpha Prime Racing	Chevrolet	1:12.550	121.571	—	—
24	9	Brandon Jones	JR Motorsports	Chevrolet	1:12.578	121.524	—	—
25	27	Jeb Burton	Jordan Anderson Racing	Chevrolet	1:12.707	121.309	—	—
26	39	Ryan Sieg	RSS Racing	Ford	1:12.722	121.284	—	—
27	78	Anthony Alfredo	B. J. McLeod Motorsports	Chevrolet	1:12.890	121.004	—	—
28	07	Josh Bilicki	SS-Green Light Racing	Ford	1:13.037	120.761	—	—
29	31	Parker Retzlaff (R)	Jordan Anderson Racing	Chevrolet	1:13.081	120.688	—	—
30	02	Blaine Perkins (R)	Our Motorsports	Chevrolet	1:13.099	120.658	—	—
31	96	Max McLaughlin	FRS Racing	Chevrolet	1:13.185	120.516	—	—
32	6	Brennan Poole	JD Motorsports	Chevrolet	1:13.279	120.362	—	—
33	4	Kyle Weatherman	JD Motorsports	Chevrolet	1:13.385	120.188	—	—
Qualified by owner's points
34	92	Josh Williams	DGM Racing	Chevrolet	1:13.431	120.113	—	—
35	43	Ryan Ellis	Alpha Prime Racing	Chevrolet	1:13.695	119.682	—	—
36	38	Joe Graf Jr.	RSS Racing	Ford	1:14.040	119.125	—	—
37	28	Kyle Sieg	RSS Racing	Ford	1:14.408	118.536	—	—
38	35	Stanton Barrett	Emerling-Gase Motorsports	Toyota	1:14.657	118.140	—	—
Failed to qualify
39	53	Patrick Emerling	Emerling-Gase Motorsports	Chevrolet	1:14.548	118.313	—	—
40	74	Casey Carden (i)	CHK Racing	Chevrolet	1:16.677	115.028	—	—
Official qualifying results
Official starting lineup

== Race results ==
Stage 1 Laps: 20

Pos.	#	Driver	Team	Make	Pts
1	19	Ty Gibbs (i)	Joe Gibbs Racing	Toyota	0
2	7	Justin Allgaier	JR Motorsports	Chevrolet	9
3	1	Sam Mayer	JR Motorsports	Chevrolet	8
4	8	Josh Berry	JR Motorsports	Chevrolet	7
5	21	Austin Hill	Richard Childress Racing	Chevrolet	6
6	20	John Hunter Nemechek	Joe Gibbs Racing	Toyota	5
7	2	Sheldon Creed	Richard Childress Racing	Chevrolet	4
8	98	Riley Herbst	Stewart-Haas Racing	Ford	3
9	00	Cole Custer	Stewart-Haas Racing	Ford	2
10	48	Parker Kligerman	Big Machine Racing	Chevrolet	1

Stage 2 Laps: 20

Pos.	#	Driver	Team	Make	Pts
1	19	Ty Gibbs (i)	Joe Gibbs Racing	Toyota	0
2	17	Alex Bowman (i)	Hendrick Motorsports	Chevrolet	0
3	21	Austin Hill	Richard Childress Racing	Chevrolet	8
4	7	Justin Allgaier	JR Motorsports	Chevrolet	7
5	00	Cole Custer	Stewart-Haas Racing	Ford	6
6	1	Sam Mayer	JR Motorsports	Chevrolet	5
7	8	Josh Berry	JR Motorsports	Chevrolet	4
8	20	John Hunter Nemechek	Joe Gibbs Racing	Toyota	3
9	48	Parker Kligerman	Big Machine Racing	Chevrolet	2
10	2	Sheldon Creed	Richard Childress Racing	Chevrolet	1

Stage 3 Laps: 46

Pos.	St	#	Driver	Team	Make	Laps	Led	Status	Pts
1	5	1	Sam Mayer	JR Motorsports	Chevrolet	86	8	Running	53
2	13	2	Sheldon Creed	Richard Childress Racing	Chevrolet	86	0	Running	41
3	14	48	Parker Kligerman	Big Machine Racing	Chevrolet	86	0	Running	36
4	17	91	Ross Chastain (i)	DGM Racing	Chevrolet	86	0	Running	0
5	19	24	Connor Mosack (R)	Sam Hunt Racing	Toyota	86	0	Running	32
6	12	20	John Hunter Nemechek	Joe Gibbs Racing	Toyota	86	0	Running	39
7	4	00	Cole Custer	Stewart-Haas Racing	Ford	86	1	Running	38
8	18	16	Chandler Smith (R)	Kaulig Racing	Chevrolet	86	0	Running	29
9	2	17	Alex Bowman (i)	Hendrick Motorsports	Chevrolet	86	4	Running	0
10	25	27	Jeb Burton	Jordan Anderson Racing	Chevrolet	86	0	Running	27
11	24	9	Brandon Jones	JR Motorsports	Chevrolet	86	0	Running	26
12	32	6	Brennan Poole	JD Motorsports	Chevrolet	86	0	Running	25
13	33	4	Kyle Weatherman	JD Motorsports	Chevrolet	86	2	Running	24
14	11	21	Austin Hill	Richard Childress Racing	Chevrolet	86	0	Running	37
15	21	45	Sage Karam	Alpha Prime Racing	Chevrolet	86	0	Running	22
16	3	7	Justin Allgaier	JR Motorsports	Chevrolet	86	1	Running	37
17	1	19	Ty Gibbs (i)	Joe Gibbs Racing	Toyota	86	70	Running	0
18	9	18	Sammy Smith (R)	Joe Gibbs Racing	Toyota	86	0	Running	19
19	37	28	Kyle Sieg	RSS Racing	Ford	86	0	Running	18
20	7	8	Josh Berry	JR Motorsports	Chevrolet	86	0	Running	28
21	26	39	Ryan Sieg	RSS Racing	Ford	86	0	Running	16
22	36	38	Joe Graf Jr.	RSS Racing	Ford	85	0	Running	15
23	6	11	Daniel Hemric	Kaulig Racing	Chevrolet	84	0	Running	14
24	22	08	Alex Labbé	SS-Green Light Racing	Chevrolet	83	0	Running	13
25	28	07	Josh Bilicki	SS-Green Light Racing	Ford	83	0	Running	12
26	29	31	Parker Retzlaff (R)	Jordan Anderson Racing	Chevrolet	82	0	Running	11
27	8	10	Kyle Busch (i)	Kaulig Racing	Chevrolet	78	0	Transmission	0
28	15	26	Kaz Grala	Sam Hunt Racing	Toyota	78	0	Accident	9
29	20	25	Brett Moffitt	AM Racing	Ford	66	0	Suspension	8
30	35	43	Ryan Ellis	Alpha Prime Racing	Chevrolet	65	0	Running	7
31	27	78	Anthony Alfredo	B. J. McLeod Motorsports	Chevrolet	61	0	Axle	6
32	38	35	Stanton Barrett	Emerling-Gase Motorsports	Toyota	56	0	Suspension	5
33	23	44	Stefan Parsons	Alpha Prime Racing	Chevrolet	45	0	Brakes	4
34	31	96	Max McLaughlin	FRS Racing	Chevrolet	43	0	Accident	3
35	10	98	Riley Herbst	Stewart-Haas Racing	Ford	37	0	Suspension	5
36	34	92	Josh Williams	DGM Racing	Chevrolet	23	0	Accident	1
37	16	51	Jeremy Clements	Jeremy Clements Racing	Chevrolet	21	0	Suspension	1
38	30	02	Blaine Perkins (R)	Our Motorsports	Chevrolet	11	0	Transmission	1
Official race results

== Standings after the race ==
Drivers' Championship standings

	Pos	Driver	Points
	1	Austin Hill	886
	2	John Hunter Nemechek	877 (-9)
	3	Justin Allgaier	852 (–34)
	4	Cole Custer	775 (–111)
1	5	Sam Mayer	735 (–151)
1	6	Josh Berry	713 (–173)
	7	Chandler Smith	651 (–235)
	8	Daniel Hemric	635 (–251)
1	9	Sheldon Creed	629 (–257)
1	10	Riley Herbst	610 (–276)
	11	Parker Kligerman	607 (–279)
	12	Sammy Smith	586 (–300)
Official driver's standings

- Note: Only the first 12 positions are included for the driver standings.

Previous race: 2023 Pennzoil 150	NASCAR Xfinity Series; 2023 season	Next race: 2023 Wawa 250
