= Kyle Weatherman =

American racing driver (born 1997)

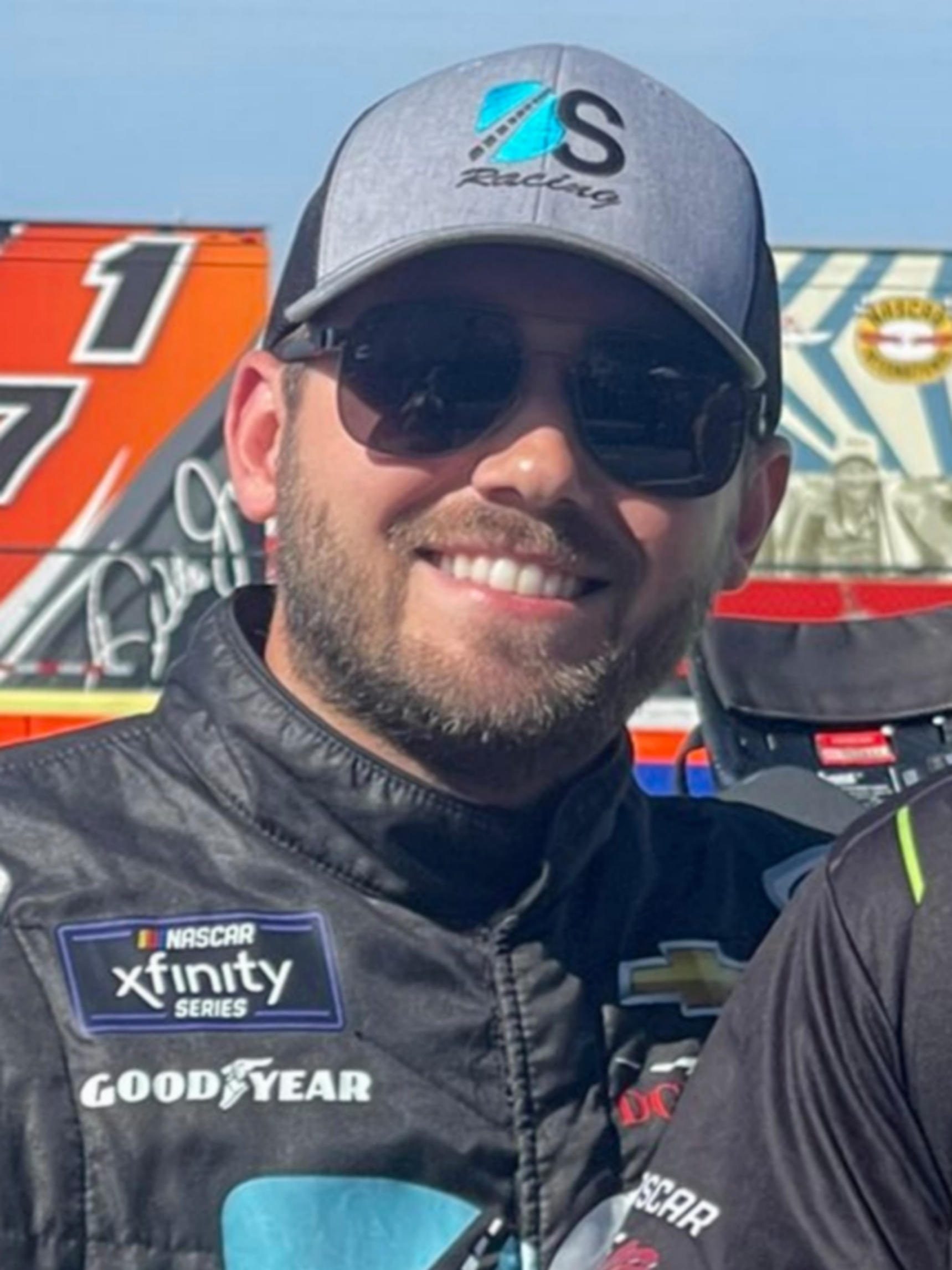
- Weatherman at Sonoma Raceway in 2024
- Born: Kyle Jay Weatherman; August 28, 1997 (age 29); Wentzville, Missouri, U.S.
- Awards: 2015 ARCA Racing Series Rookie of the Year

NASCAR Cup Series career
- 11 races run over 3 years
- 2019 position: 61st
- Best finish: 38th (2018)
- First race: 2017 First Data 500 (Martinsville)
- Last race: 2019 Bass Pro Shops NRA Night Race (Bristol)
Wins	Top tens	Poles
0	0	0

NASCAR O'Reilly Auto Parts Series career
- 139 races run over 6 years
- 2024 position: 25th
- Best finish: 22nd (2022)
- First race: 2019 Alsco 300 (Bristol)
- Last race: 2024 Credit One NASCAR Amex Credit Card 300 (Homestead)
Wins	Top tens	Poles
0	5	0

NASCAR FedEx Freight Truck Series career
- 1 race run over 1 year
- 2015 position: 68th
- Best finish: 68th (2015)
- First race: 2015 Ford EcoBoost 200 (Homestead)
Wins	Top tens	Poles
0	0	0

ARCA Menards Series career
- 50 races run over 5 years
- Best finish: 7th (2016)
- First race: 2013 Kentuckiana Ford Dealers 200 (Salem)
- Last race: 2017 Fans With Benefits 150 (Iowa)
- First win: 2015 ARCA 150 presented by Unique Pretzels (Millville)
Wins	Top tens	Poles
1	36	5
- Statistics up to date as of October 26, 2024.

Kyle Jay Weatherman (born August 28, 1997) is an American professional stock car racing driver. He last competed part-time in the NASCAR Xfinity Series, driving the Nos. 91 and 36 Chevrolet Camaro SSs for DGM Racing. He has also previously competed in the NASCAR Cup Series, NASCAR Craftsman Truck Series and ARCA Menards Series.

== Racing career ==
=== Early years ===
Weatherman was born in Wentzville, Missouri, where he was first introduced to racing by his father and a family friend at the age of eight years old, with Kyle and brother Clayton both racing go-karts. Later on, Weatherman moved up to bandolero racing. He spent four years racing Bandoleros, culminating in a national championship.

At the age of twelve, Weatherman moved to the Legends Series, in which he raced until the age of fifteen. At the same time, he participated in some IMCA dirt races. He won the Legends National Championship at Las Vegas Motor Speedway and became the youngest driver up until that point to claim victory in that race.

=== ARCA Racing Series ===
When Weatherman was fifteen, he made the move to the ARCA Racing Series. Running in five races that year, he recorded four top fives and a best finish of second with his family-owned team. The following year, he also became a development driver for Roush Fenway Racing. He made eight starts for the Roush-affiliated Roulo Brothers Racing, finding moderate success. 2015 was a highly successful season as he was named Rookie of the Year, won the Short-Track Championship and contributed to winning the Bill France Four Crown Award, riding with Cunningham Motorsports. Weatherman won all those accolades despite not running a full schedule; in fifteen races he won his first career race at New Jersey Motorsports Park, won three straight poles and led laps in ten races while posting just two finishes outside the top-ten. Signing on with Lira Motorsports to start 2015, Weatherman ran eight races with the team before running the next two with Mason Mitchell Motorsports. In his first race, at Madison International Speedway, Weatherman led over half of the 200 laps and came home second to Josh Williams. Running a few races for his own team near the end of the season, Weatherman captured the pole at Pocono and was briefly hospitalized after a hard crash with Myatt Snider in the season's final race. He ended up competing in fifteen of twenty events to finish seventh in points; he had seven top-five and nine top-ten finishes. Prior to the 2017 season, Mason Mitchell Motorsports announced that Weatherman would run ten races for the team. Weatherman once again led the most laps early in the season at the Nashville Fairgrounds Speedway.

=== NASCAR ===
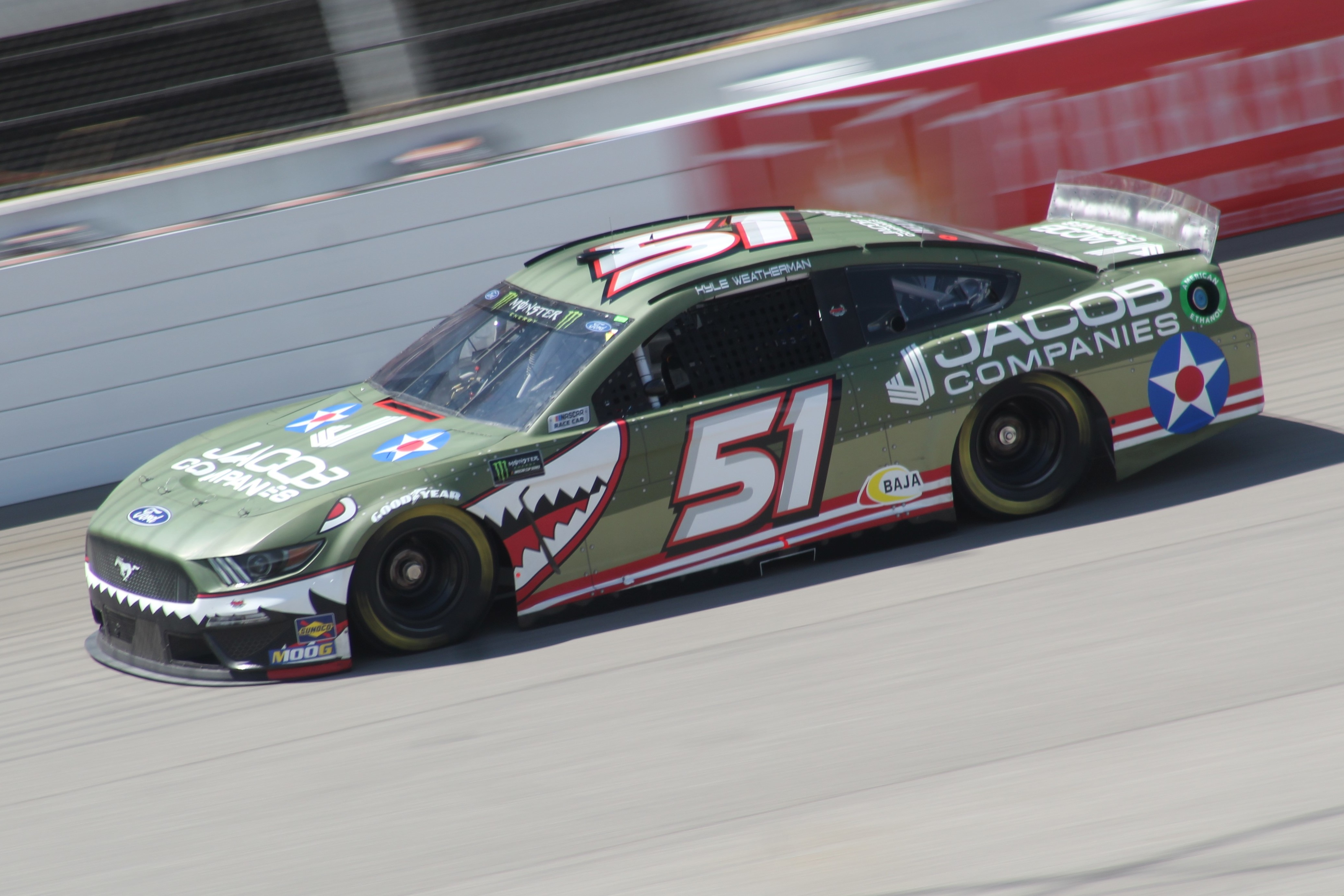
Weatherman competing in the 2019 FireKeepers Casino 400 at Michigan International Speedway

Weatherman teamed up with Roush Fenway Racing development team Lira Motorsports to run the 2015 NASCAR Camping World Truck Series season finale at Homestead-Miami Speedway. In the debut race for driver and team, Weatherman qualified 21st but was hampered by a pit road penalty in the early stages of the event, resulting in a 23rd-place finish, three laps down.

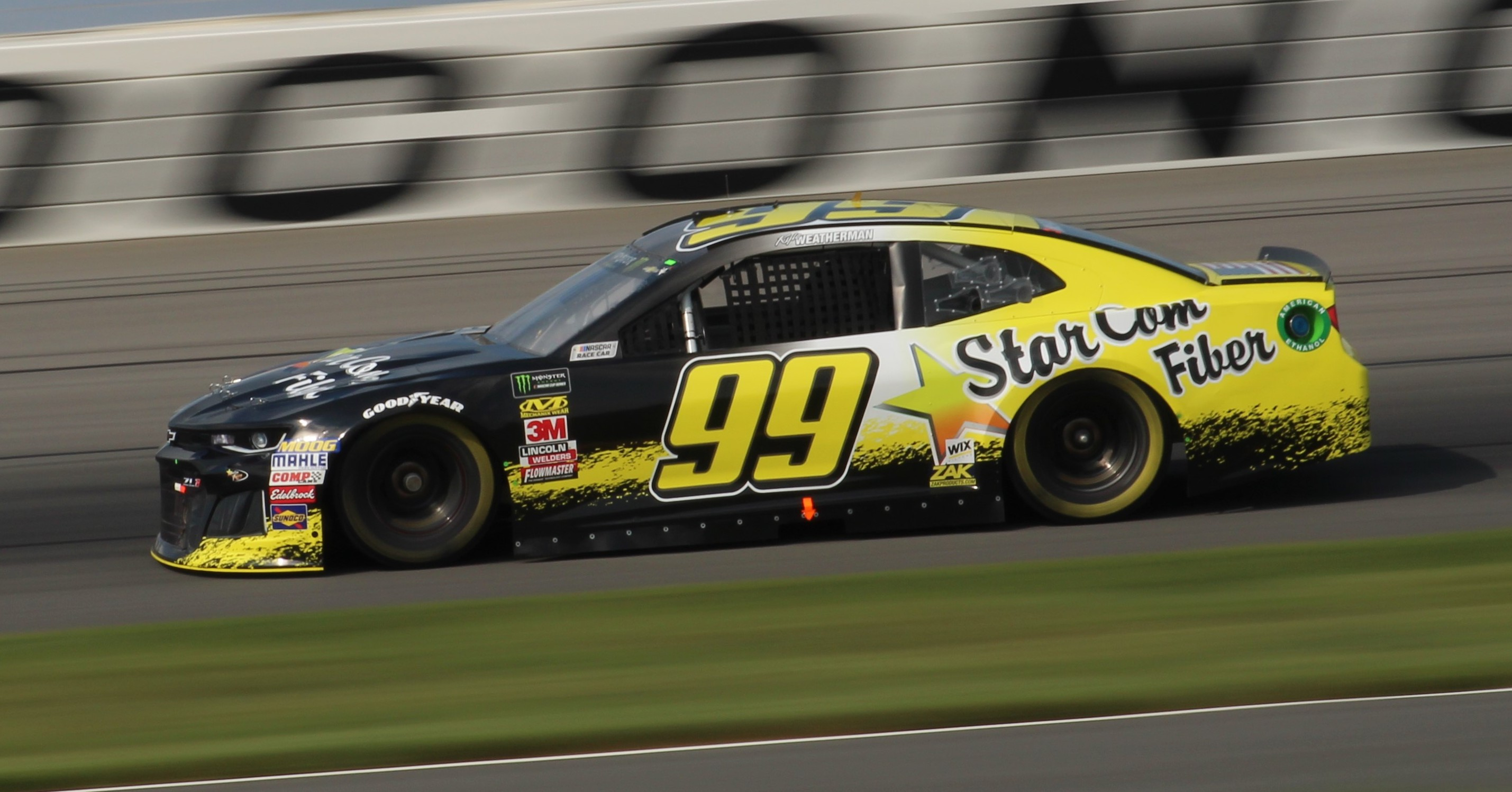
Weatherman in the No. 99 at Pocono Raceway in 2018.

On October 23, 2017, it was announced that Weatherman would make his Monster Energy NASCAR Cup Series debut driving Rick Ware Racing's No. 51 at Martinsville Speedway. He would also drive the car at Phoenix International Raceway. A year later, Weatherman joined StarCom Racing to run the 2018 Overton's 400 at Chicagoland Speedway, driving the No. 99 car. Although that was his first race appearance for the team, Weatherman had been a StarCom employee since April. Weatherman wound up making six additional starts in the No. 99, recording a best finish of 26th at Las Vegas Motor Speedway.

In 2019, Weatherman debuted in the NASCAR Xfinity Series for Rick Ware Racing, and also made a Cup start for the team at Michigan International Speedway in June. Later that month at Sonoma Raceway, he qualified Premium Motorsports' No. 15 car in place of Ross Chastain, who was competing in the Truck race at Gateway.

Weatherman returned to Mike Harmon Racing and the Xfinity Series in 2020. At Kentucky Speedway's Shady Rays 200 in July, Weatherman scored MHR's best finish and maiden top ten when he finished eighth.

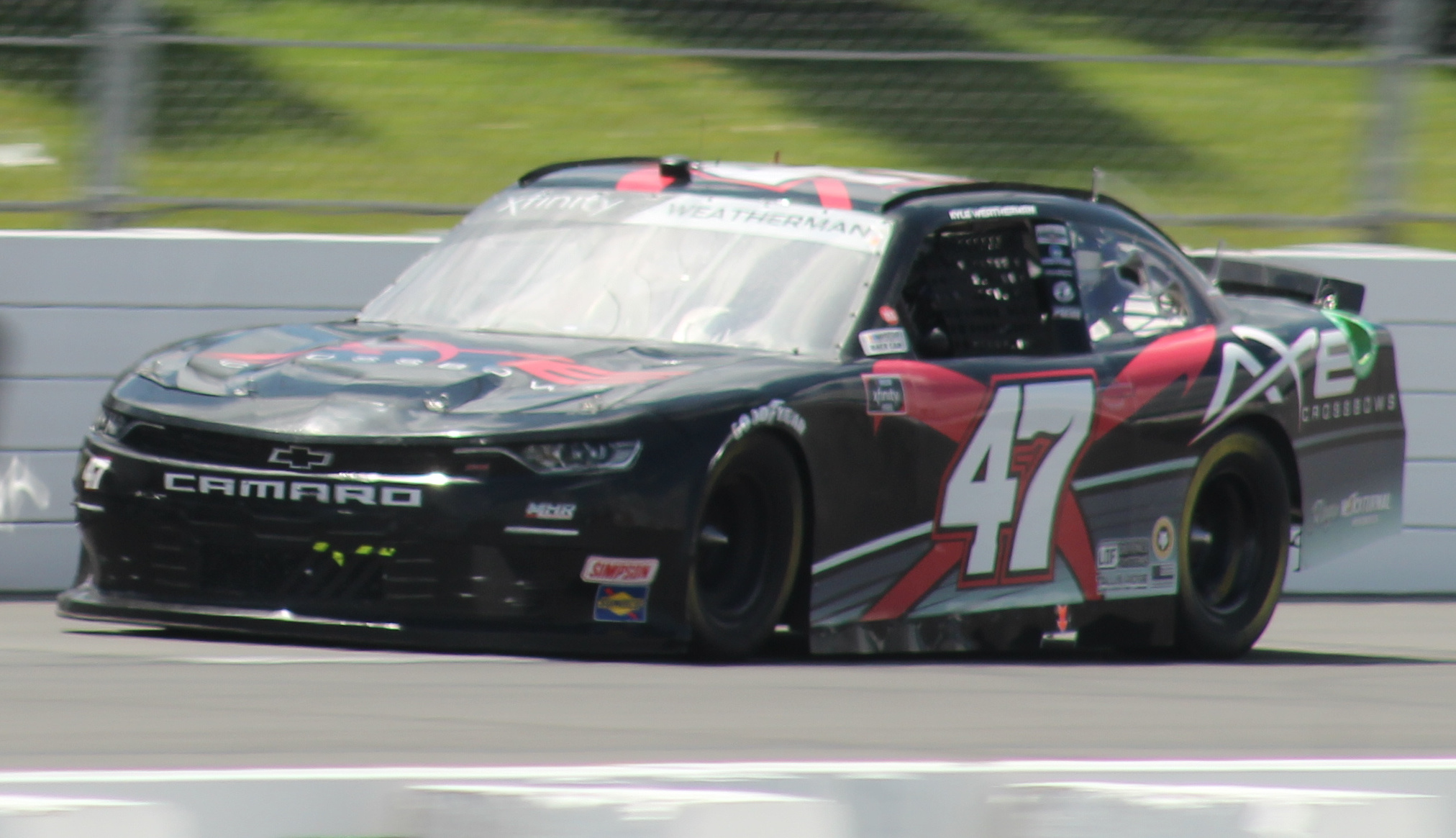
Weatherman's No. 47 car at Pocono in 2021

Weatherman was promoted to a full-time ride in MHR's No. 47 for the 2021 Xfinity season. Weatherman departed the team at the end of the year.

On January 31, 2022, Weatherman announced he would drive the first five races of the NASCAR Xfinity Series season with DGM Racing driving the 92 and having sponsorship from LS Tractor at Daytona International Speedway and Atlanta Motor Speedway. California Law Enforcement would sponsor Weatherman at Auto Club Speedway, Las Vegas Motor Speedway and Phoenix Raceway. He finished eighth at Atlanta. He also drove for the No. 34 Jesse Iwuji Motorsports Chevrolet for a majority of the season, including another eighth place finish at Loudon.

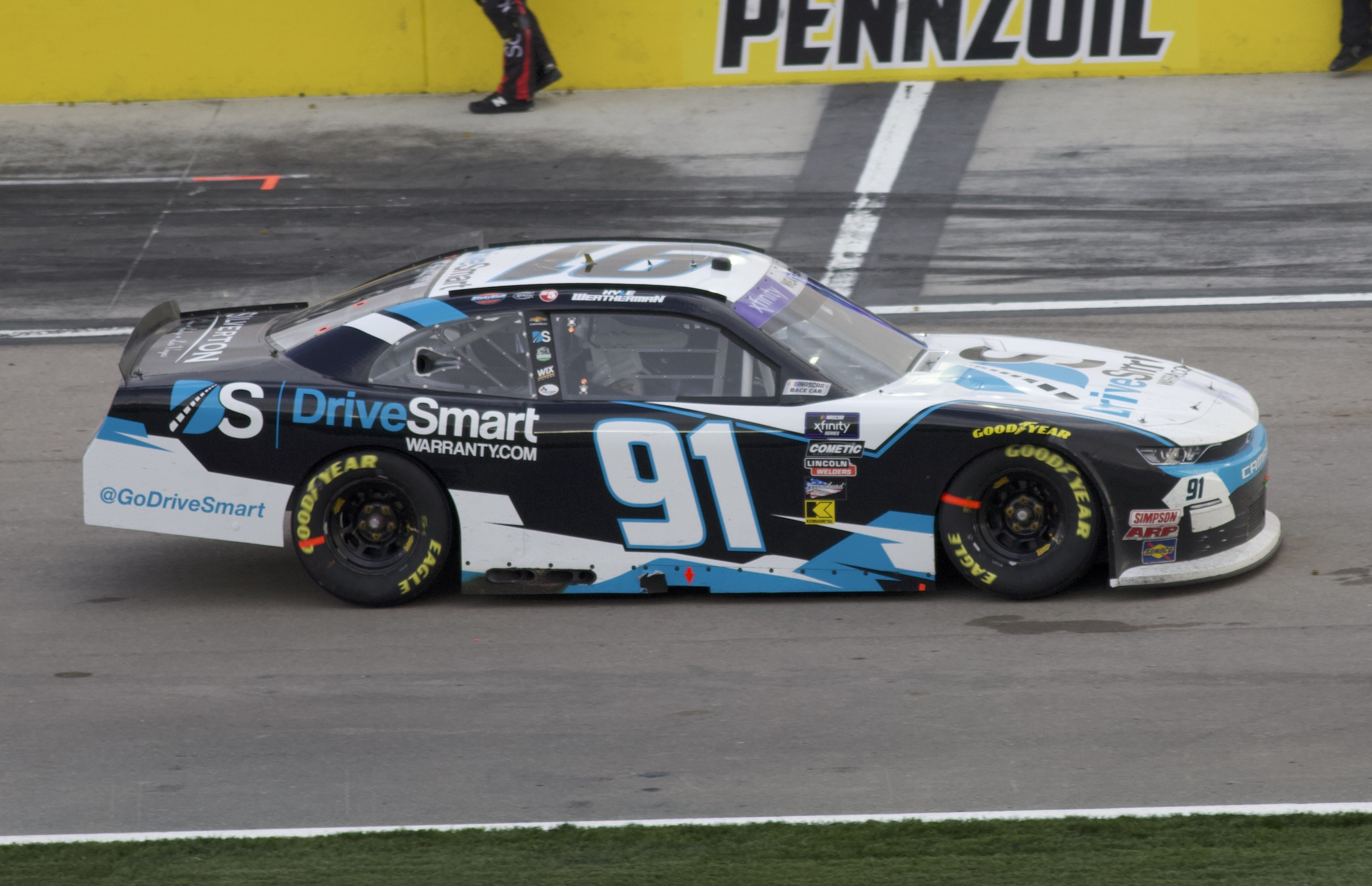
Weatherman's No. 91 car at Las Vegas Motor Speedway in 2024.

On November 14, 2023, it was announced that Weatherman would return to DGM in 2024, this time driving the No. 91 full-time. Following the Portland race, Weatherman was fined US$25,000 for intentionally damaging another vehicle on pit road. Weatherman would be moved to the team's part-time No. 36 car for the race at Watkins Glen due to Josh Bilicki bringing sponsorship to drive the No. 91 and Dawson Cram bringing sponsorship to drive the No. 92, the team's two full-time cars. Weatherman would not drive in the final two races of the season due to sponsorship issues.

== Personal life ==
Weatherman, the oldest child of Daryn and Lori Weatherman, was born and raised in Wentzville, Missouri, where he lived until he was seventeen. He then moved to Concord, North Carolina, and lived with fellow driver Chris Buescher. Weatherman views Buescher, the 2015 NASCAR Xfinity Series champion, as a mentor and a major influence on his career.

Weatherman has two younger siblings, one of whom is ARCA driver Clayton Weatherman.

== Motorsports career results ==
=== NASCAR ===
(key) (Bold – Pole position awarded by qualifying time. Italics – Pole position earned by points standings or practice time. * – Most laps led.)

==== Monster Energy Cup Series ====
Monster Energy NASCAR Cup Series results
Year	Team	No.	Make	1	2	3	4	5	6	7	8	9	10	11	12	13	14	15	16	17	18	19	20	21	22	23	24	25	26	27	28	29	30	31	32	33	34	35	36	MENCC	Pts	Ref
2017	Rick Ware Racing	51	Chevy	DAY	ATL	LVS	PHO	CAL	MAR	TEX	BRI	RCH	TAL	KAN	CLT	DOV	POC	MCH	SON	DAY	KEN	NHA	IND	POC	GLN	MCH	BRI	DAR	RCH	CHI	NHA	DOV	CLT	TAL	KAN	MAR; 35	TEX	PHO; 34	HOM	45th	5	
2018	StarCom Racing	99	Chevy	DAY	ATL	LVS	PHO	CAL	MAR	TEX	BRI	RCH	TAL	DOV	KAN	CLT	POC	MCH	SON	CHI; 33	DAY	KEN	NHA; 31	POC; 31	GLN	MCH	BRI	DAR	IND	LVS; 26	RCH	ROV	DOV	TAL	KAN; 35	MAR	TEX; 34	PHO	HOM; 35	38th	33	
2019	Rick Ware Racing	51	Ford	DAY	ATL	LVS	PHO	CAL	MAR	TEX	BRI	RCH	TAL	DOV	KAN	CLT	POC	MCH; 36																						61st	0^{1}	
2019	Premium Motorsports	15	Chevy																SON; QL^{†}	CHI	DAY	KEN	NHA	POC	GLN	MCH														61st	0^{1}	
2019	Rick Ware Racing	52	Chevy																								BRI; 31	DAR	IND	LVS	RCH	ROV	DOV	TAL	KAN	MAR	TEX	PHO	HOM	61st	0^{1}	
^{†} – Qualified for Ross Chastain

==== Xfinity Series ====
NASCAR Xfinity Series results
Year	Team	No.	Make	1	2	3	4	5	6	7	8	9	10	11	12	13	14	15	16	17	18	19	20	21	22	23	24	25	26	27	28	29	30	31	32	33	NXSC	Pts	Ref
2019	Rick Ware Racing	17	Chevy	DAY	ATL	LVS	PHO	CAL	TEX	BRI; 28	RCH; 32	TAL	DOV	CLT	POC													IND; 35						TEX; 34	PHO	HOM	54th	35	
2019	Mike Harmon Racing	74	Chevy													MCH; 34	IOW	CHI	DAY	KEN	NHA	IOW	GLN	MOH	BRI	ROA	DAR		LVS; 32	RCH	ROV		KAN; 22				54th	35	
2019	Jimmy Means Racing	53	Chevy																													DOV; 35					54th	35	
2020	Mike Harmon Racing	74	Chevy	DAY	LVS; 30	CAL; 34	PHO	DAR	CLT	BRI	ATL																										31st	236	
2020	Mike Harmon Racing	47	Chevy									HOM; 33	HOM; 35	TAL	POC; 15	IRC; 15	KEN; 8	KEN; 36	TEX; 28	KAN; 36	ROA; 21	DRC; 17	DOV; 25	DOV; 35	DAY	DAR; 36	RCH; 26	RCH; 20	BRI; 32	LVS; 36	TAL	ROV; 37	KAN	TEX; 19	MAR; 30	PHO; 17	31st	236	
2021	Mike Harmon Racing	47	Chevy	DAY; 15	DRC; 16	HOM; 25	LVS; 33	PHO; 34	ATL; 28	MAR; 25	TAL; 23	DAR; 33	DOV; 22	COA; DNQ	CLT; DNQ	MOH; 26	TEX; 37	NSH; 28	POC; 26	ROA; DNQ	ATL; 32	NHA; 19	GLN; 34	IRC; 16	MCH; 24	DAY; 32	DAR; 34	RCH; 15	BRI; 29	LVS; 18	TAL; 20	ROV; 23	TEX; 25	KAN; 21	MAR; 34	PHO; 26	24th	341	
2022	DGM Racing	92	Chevy	DAY; 32	CAL; 16	LVS; 26	PHO; 30	ATL; 8	COA																												22nd	369	
2022	Jesse Iwuji Motorsports	34	Chevy							RCH; 28	MAR; 16	TAL	DOV; 27	DAR; 12	TEX; QL^{†}	CLT; 36	PIR	NSH; 38	ROA; QL^{†}	ATL	NHA; 8	POC; 19	IRC; 30	MCH; 16	GLN; 22	DAY	DAR; 16	KAN; QL^{†}	BRI; 17	TEX; 22	TAL	ROV	LVS; 14	HOM; 20	MAR; 30	PHO; 14	22nd	369	
2023	Our Motorsports	02	Chevy	DAY	CAL	LVS; 16	PHO; 17	ATL; 33	COA; 22				DOV; 14	DAR																							26th	336	
2023	FRS Racing	96	Chevy							RCH; DNQ	MAR; 34	TAL																									26th	336	
2023	DGM Racing	91	Chevy												CLT; 20	PIR								MCH; 35					KAN; 38		TEX; 15		LVS; 36	HOM; 16	MAR	PHO; 17	26th	336	
2023	SS-Green Light Racing	08	Ford														SON; 22																				26th	336	
2023	JD Motorsports	4	Chevy															NSH; 18	CSC; 14		NHA; 27	POC	ROA; 20		IRC; 20	GLN; 13	DAY; 33	DAR; 31		BRI; 23		ROV; 26					26th	336	
2023	DGM Racing	36	Chevy																	ATL; 31																	26th	336	
2024	DGM Racing	91	Chevy	DAY; 38	ATL; 17	LVS; 21	PHO; 16	COA; 29	RCH; 17	MAR; 33	TEX; 36	TAL; 27	DOV; 8	DAR; 17	CLT; 11	PIR; 25	SON; 30	IOW; 33	NHA; 25	NSH; 31	CSC; 14	POC; 23	IND; 25	MCH; 32	DAY; 10	DAR; 37	ATL; 11		BRI; 26	KAN; 26	TAL; 31	ROV	LVS; 20	HOM; 14	MAR	PHO	25th	394	
2024	DGM Racing	36	Chevy																									GLN; 38									25th	394	
^{†} – Qualified for Jesse Iwuji

==== Camping World Truck Series ====
NASCAR Camping World Truck Series results
Year	Team	No.	Make	1	2	3	4	5	6	7	8	9	10	11	12	13	14	15	16	17	18	19	20	21	22	23	NCWTC	Pts	Ref
2015	Lira Motorsports	58	Ford	DAY	ATL	MAR	KAN	CLT	DOV	TEX	GTW	IOW	KEN	ELD	POC	MCH	BRI	MSP	CHI	NHA	LVS	TAL	MAR	TEX	PHO	HOM; 23	68th	21	

^{*} Season still in progress
^{1} Ineligible for series points

=== ARCA Racing Series ===
(key) (Bold – Pole position awarded by qualifying time. Italics – Pole position earned by points standings or practice time. * – Most laps led.)

ARCA Racing Series results
Year	Team	No.	Make	1	2	3	4	5	6	7	8	9	10	11	12	13	14	15	16	17	18	19	20	21	ARSC	Pts	Ref
2013	Weatherman Motorsports	11	Dodge	DAY	MOB	SLM; 4	TAL	TOL; 12	ELK	POC	MCH	ROA	WIN; 4	CHI	NJE	POC	BLN	ISF	MAD	DSF	IOW; 2	SLM; 2	KEN	KAN	27th	1055	
2014	Roulo Brothers Racing	99	Ford	DAY	MOB	SLM; 10	TAL	TOL	NJE	POC	MCH	ELK													21st	1440	
2014	Roulo Brothers Racing	17	Ford										WIN; 21	CHI											21st	1440	
2014	Roulo Brothers Racing	60	Ford												IRP; 10	POC	BLN; 4	ISF	MAD; 7	DSF; 9	SLM; 11	KEN; 8	KAN		21st	1440	
2015	Cunningham Motorsports	22	Dodge	DAY	MOB; 5					NJE; 1	POC	MCH	CHI		**IOW**; 2				ISF; 2	DSF; 2*		KEN; 7	KAN; 2		10th	3565	
2015	Cunningham Motorsports	22	Ford			**NSH**; 5	SLM; 2	TAL	TOL; 5					WIN; 4		**IRP**; 7	POC; 31	BLN; 7			SLM; 11*				10th	3565	
2016	Lira Motorsports	58	Ford	DAY; 3	NSH; 24	SLM; 4	TAL; 12	TOL; 3	NJE; 7	POC; 18	MCH; 12														7th	3165	
2016	Mason Mitchell Motorsports	98	Chevy									MAD; 2*	WIN; 3												7th	3165	
2016	Weatherman Motorsports	10	Ford											IOW; 9	IRP	**POC**; 5	BLN	ISF	DSF	SLM	CHI; 4	KEN; 19	KAN; 28		7th	3165	
2017	Mason Mitchell Motorsports	78	Chevy	DAY; 8	**NSH**; 2*	SLM; 3	TAL; 32	TOL	ELK	POC; 16	MCH; 14*	MAD	IOW; 5	IRP	POC	WIN	ISF	ROA	DSF	SLM	CHI	KEN	KAN		27th	1040	
