= 2020 My Bariatric Solutions 300 =

NASCAR Xfinity Series race

Race details
- Race 16 of 33 in the 2020 NASCAR Xfinity Series season
- Date: July 18, 2020
- Location: Texas Motor Speedway in Fort Worth, Texas
- Course: Permanent racing facility
- Course length: 1.5 miles (2.414 km)
- Distance: 201 laps, 301.5 mi (485.217 km)
- Scheduled distance: 200 laps, 300 mi (482.803 km)

Pole position
Driver	Michael Annett	JR Motorsports
- Grid positions set by ballot

Most laps led
Driver	Justin Allgaier	JR Motorsports
- Laps: 98

Winner
No. 22	Austin Cindric	Team Penske

Television in the United States
- Network: NBCSN
- Announcers: Rick Allen, Steve Letarte, Jeff Burton, Dale Earnhardt Jr.
- Nielsen ratings: 973,000

Radio in the United States
- Radio: PRN

The 2020 My Bariatric Solutions 300 was a NASCAR Xfinity Series race held on July 18, 2020 at Texas Motor Speedway in Fort Worth, Texas. Contested over 201 laps – extended from 200 due to an overtime finish – on the 1.5-mile (2.4 km) intermediate quad-oval, it was the 16th race of the 2020 NASCAR Xfinity Series season. Austin Cindric won his third consecutive race after Kyle Busch's car failed post-race inspection.

The race was originally scheduled to be held on March 28, 2020, but was postponed due to the ongoing COVID-19 pandemic.

== Report ==
=== Background ===
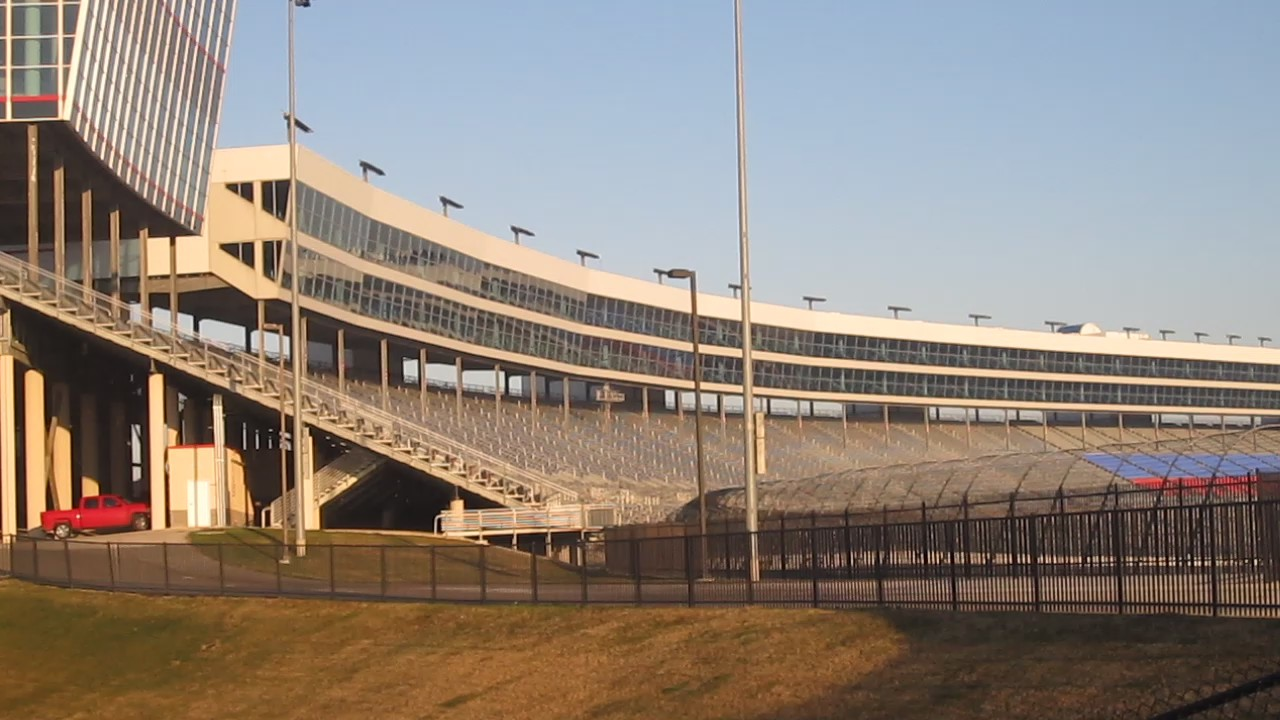
Texas Motor Speedway, the track where the race was held.

Texas Motor Speedway is a speedway located in the northernmost portion of the U.S. city of Fort Worth, Texas – the portion located in Denton County, Texas. The track measures 1.5 miles (2.4 km) around and is banked 24 degrees in the turns, and is of the oval design, where the front straightaway juts outward slightly. The track layout is similar to Atlanta Motor Speedway and Charlotte Motor Speedway (formerly Lowe's Motor Speedway). The track is owned by Speedway Motorsports, Inc., the same company that owns Atlanta and Charlotte Motor Speedways, as well as the short-track Bristol Motor Speedway.

Because of the ongoing COVID-19 pandemic, the race was held without spectators in the grandstands. However, spectators with backstretch camping were allowed to attend.

=== Entry list ===
- (R) denotes rookie driver.
- (i) denotes driver who is ineligible for series driver points.

No.	Driver	Team	Manufacturer
0	Jeffrey Earnhardt	JD Motorsports	Chevrolet
1	Michael Annett	JR Motorsports	Chevrolet
02	Brett Moffitt (i)	Our Motorsports	Chevrolet
4	Jesse Little (R)	JD Motorsports	Chevrolet
5	Matt Mills	B. J. McLeod Motorsports	Chevrolet
6	B. J. McLeod	JD Motorsports	Chevrolet
7	Justin Allgaier	JR Motorsports	Chevrolet
07	David Starr	SS-Green Light Racing	Chevrolet
8	Jeb Burton	JR Motorsports	Chevrolet
08	Joe Graf Jr. (R)	SS-Green Light Racing	Chevrolet
9	Noah Gragson	JR Motorsports	Chevrolet
10	Ross Chastain	Kaulig Racing	Chevrolet
11	Justin Haley	Kaulig Racing	Chevrolet
13	Chad Finchum	MBM Motorsports	Toyota
15	Colby Howard	JD Motorsports	Chevrolet
18	Riley Herbst (R)	Joe Gibbs Racing	Toyota
19	Brandon Jones	Joe Gibbs Racing	Toyota
20	Harrison Burton (R)	Joe Gibbs Racing	Toyota
21	Anthony Alfredo	Richard Childress Racing	Chevrolet
22	Austin Cindric	Team Penske	Ford
36	Dexter Bean	DGM Racing	Chevrolet
39	Ryan Sieg	RSS Racing	Chevrolet
44	Tommy Joe Martins	Martins Motorsports	Chevrolet
47	Kyle Weatherman	Mike Harmon Racing	Chevrolet
51	Jeremy Clements	Jeremy Clements Racing	Chevrolet
52	Kody Vanderwal (R)	Means Racing	Chevrolet
54	Kyle Busch (i)	Joe Gibbs Racing	Toyota
61	Timmy Hill (i)	Hattori Racing	Toyota
66	Stephen Leicht	MBM Motorsports	Toyota
68	Brandon Brown	Brandonbilt Motorsports	Chevrolet
74	Bayley Currey (i)	Mike Harmon Racing	Chevrolet
78	Vinnie Miller	B. J. McLeod Motorsports	Chevrolet
90	Alex Labbé	DGM Racing	Chevrolet
92	Josh Williams	DGM Racing	Chevrolet
93	Myatt Snider (R)	RSS Racing	Chevrolet
98	Chase Briscoe	Stewart-Haas Racing	Ford
99	Stefan Parsons	B. J. McLeod Motorsports	Toyota
Official entry list

== Qualifying ==
Michael Annett was awarded the pole for the race as determined by a random draw.

=== Starting Lineup ===
Pos	No	Driver	Team	Manufacturer
1	1	Michael Annett	JR Motorsports	Chevrolet
2	8	Jeb Burton	JR Motorsports	Chevrolet
3	22	Austin Cindric	Team Penske	Ford
4	7	Justin Allgaier	JR Motorsports	Chevrolet
5	18	Riley Herbst (R)	Joe Gibbs Racing	Toyota
6	19	Brandon Jones	Joe Gibbs Racing	Toyota
7	20	Harrison Burton (R)	Joe Gibbs Racing	Toyota
8	10	Ross Chastain	Kaulig Racing	Chevrolet
9	9	Noah Gragson	JR Motorsports	Chevrolet
10	21	Anthony Alfredo	Richard Childress Racing	Chevrolet
11	11	Justin Haley	Kaulig Racing	Chevrolet
12	98	Chase Briscoe	Stewart-Haas Racing	Ford
13	36	Dexter Bean	DGM Racing	Chevrolet
14	93	Myatt Snider (R)	RSS Racing	Chevrolet
15	02	Brett Moffitt (i)	Our Motorsports	Chevrolet
16	90	Alex Labbé	DGM Racing	Chevrolet
17	6	B. J. McLeod	JD Motorsports	Chevrolet
18	39	Ryan Sieg	RSS Racing	Chevrolet
19	68	Brandon Brown	Brandonbilt Motorsports	Chevrolet
20	4	Jesse Little (R)	JD Motorsports	Chevrolet
21	0	Jeffrey Earnhardt	JD Motorsports	Chevrolet
22	51	Jeremy Clements	Jeremy Clements Racing	Chevrolet
23	07	David Starr	SS-Green Light Racing	Chevrolet
24	92	Josh Williams	DGM Racing	Chevrolet
25	08	Joe Graf Jr. (R)	SS-Green Light Racing	Chevrolet
26	99	Stefan Parsons	B. J. McLeod Motorsports	Toyota
27	61	Timmy Hill (i)	Hattori Racing	Toyota
28	54	Kyle Busch (i)	Joe Gibbs Racing	Toyota
29	13	Chad Finchum	MBM Motorsports	Toyota
30	5	Matt Mills	B. J. McLeod Motorsports	Chevrolet
31	74	Bayley Currey (i)	Mike Harmon Racing	Chevrolet
32	52	Kody Vanderwal (R)	Means Racing	Chevrolet
33	47	Kyle Weatherman	Mike Harmon Racing	Chevrolet
34	78	Vinnie Miller	B. J. McLeod Motorsports	Chevrolet
35	15	Colby Howard	JD Motorsports	Chevrolet
36	44	Tommy Joe Martins	Martins Motorsports	Chevrolet
37	66	Stephen Leicht	MBM Motorsports	Toyota
Official starting lineup

- The No. 47 of Kyle Weatherman had to start from the rear due to failing inspection multiple times.

== Race ==
=== Race results ===
==== Stage Results ====
Stage One

Laps: 45

Pos	No	Driver	Team	Manufacturer	Points
1	7	Justin Allgaier	JR Motorsports	Chevrolet	10
2	19	Brandon Jones	Joe Gibbs Racing	Toyota	9
3	22	Austin Cindric	Team Penske	Ford	8
4	98	Chase Briscoe	Stewart-Haas Racing	Ford	7
5	20	Harrison Burton (R)	Joe Gibbs Racing	Toyota	6
6	9	Noah Gragson	JR Motorsports	Chevrolet	5
7	1	Michael Annett	JR Motorsports	Chevrolet	4
8	10	Ross Chastain	Kaulig Racing	Chevrolet	3
9	21	Anthony Alfredo	Richard Childress Racing	Chevrolet	2
10	8	Jeb Burton	JR Motorsports	Chevrolet	1

Stage Two

Laps: 45

Pos	No	Driver	Team	Manufacturer	Points
1	7	Justin Allgaier	JR Motorsports	Chevrolet	10
2	22	Austin Cindric	Team Penske	Ford	9
3	19	Brandon Jones	Joe Gibbs Racing	Toyota	8
4	9	Noah Gragson	JR Motorsports	Chevrolet	7
5	98	Chase Briscoe	Stewart-Haas Racing	Ford	6
6	20	Harrison Burton (R)	Joe Gibbs Racing	Toyota	5
7	8	Jeb Burton	JR Motorsports	Chevrolet	4
8	39	Ryan Sieg	RSS Racing	Chevrolet	3
9	1	Michael Annett	JR Motorsports	Chevrolet	2
10	21	Anthony Alfredo	Richard Childress Racing	Chevrolet	1

=== Final Stage Results ===
Laps: 110

Pos	Grid	No	Driver	Team	Manufacturer	Laps	Points	Status
1	3	22	Austin Cindric	Team Penske	Ford	201	57	Running
2	12	98	Chase Briscoe	Stewart-Haas Racing	Ford	201	48	Running
3	4	7	Justin Allgaier	JR Motorsports	Chevrolet	201	54	Running
4	7	20	Harrison Burton (R)	Joe Gibbs Racing	Toyota	201	44	Running
5	1	1	Michael Annett	JR Motorsports	Chevrolet	201	38	Running
6	2	8	Jeb Burton	JR Motorsports	Chevrolet	201	36	Running
7	6	19	Brandon Jones	Joe Gibbs Racing	Toyota	201	47	Running
8	11	11	Justin Haley	Kaulig Racing	Chevrolet	201	29	Running
9	8	10	Ross Chastain	Kaulig Racing	Chevrolet	200	31	Running
10	19	68	Brandon Brown	Brandonbilt Motorsports	Chevrolet	200	27	Running
11	22	51	Jeremy Clements	Jeremy Clements Racing	Chevrolet	200	26	Running
12	21	0	Jeffrey Earnhardt	JD Motorsports	Chevrolet	199	25	Running
13	23	07	David Starr	SS-Green Light Racing	Chevrolet	199	24	Running
14	20	4	Jesse Little (R)	JD Motorsports	Chevrolet	199	23	Running
15	36	44	Tommy Joe Martins	Martins Motorsports	Chevrolet	199	22	Running
16	15	02	Brett Moffitt (i)	Our Motorsports	Chevrolet	199	0	Running
17	27	61	Timmy Hill (i)	Hattori Racing	Toyota	198	0	Running
18	26	99	Stefan Parsons	B. J. McLeod Motorsports	Toyota	198	17	Running
19	31	74	Bayley Currey (i)	Mike Harmon Racing	Chevrolet	198	0	Running
20	17	6	B. J. McLeod	JD Motorsports	Chevrolet	198	17	Running
21	25	08	Joe Graf Jr. (R)	SS-Green Light Racing	Chevrolet	198	16	Running
22	24	92	Josh Williams	DGM Racing	Chevrolet	198	15	Running
23	35	15	Colby Howard	JD Motorsports	Chevrolet	198	14	Running
24	29	13	Chad Finchum	MBM Motorsports	Toyota	197	13	Running
25	34	78	Vinnie Miller	B. J. McLeod Motorsports	Chevrolet	193	12	Suspension
26	30	5	Matt Mills	B. J. McLeod Motorsports	Chevrolet	193	11	Running
27	10	21	Anthony Alfredo	Richard Childress Racing	Chevrolet	191	13	Suspension
28	33	47	Kyle Weatherman	Mike Harmon Racing	Chevrolet	178	9	Running
29	18	39	Ryan Sieg	RSS Racing	Chevrolet	130	11	Suspension
30	9	9	Noah Gragson	JR Motorsports	Chevrolet	125	19	DVP
31	16	90	Alex Labbé	DGM Racing	Chevrolet	82	6	Rear Gear
32	32	52	Kody Vanderwal (R)	Means Racing	Chevrolet	78	5	DVP
33	13	36	Dexter Bean	DGM Racing	Chevrolet	64	4	Power
34	14	93	Myatt Snider (R)	RSS Racing	Chevrolet	50	3	Accident
35	37	66	Stephen Leicht	MBM Motorsports	Toyota	9	2	Transmission
36	5	18	Riley Herbst (R)	Joe Gibbs Racing	Toyota	9	1	DVP
37	28	54	Kyle Busch (i) (Note: Busch initially won the race, but was disqualified after failing post-race inspection.)	Joe Gibbs Racing	Toyota	201	0	Running
Official race results

=== Race statistics ===
- Lead changes: 15 among 7 different drivers
- Cautions/Laps: 9 for 39
- Red flags: 0
- Time of race: 2 hours, 22 minutes, 32 seconds
- Average speed: 126.918 mph (204.255 km/h)

== Media ==
=== Television ===
The My Bariatric Solutions 300 was carried by NBCSN in the United States. Rick Allen, Steve Letarte, Jeff Burton, and Dale Earnhardt Jr. called the race from the booth at Charlotte Motor Speedway, with Marty Snider and Dave Burns covering pit road.

NBCSN
Booth announcers	Pit reporter
Lap-by-lap: Rick Allen Color-commentator: Steve Letarte Color-commentator: Jeff Burton Color-commentator: Dale Earnhardt Jr.	Marty Snider Dave Burns

=== Radio ===
The Performance Racing Network (PRN) called the race for radio, which was simulcast on SiriusXM NASCAR Radio.

== Standings after the race ==
Drivers' Championship standings

	Pos	Driver	Points
	1	Chase Briscoe	691
1	2	Austin Cindric	667
1	3	Noah Gragson	643
	4	Ross Chastain	614
	5	Justin Haley	550
1	6	Justin Allgaier	545
1	7	Harrison Burton (R)	536
	8	Michael Annett	481
	9	Brandon Jones	448
	10	Riley Herbst (R)	377
	11	Ryan Sieg	375
	12	Brandon Brown	348
Official driver's standings

- Note: Only the first 12 positions are included for the driver standings.
- . – Driver has clinched a position in the NASCAR playoffs.

== Notes ==
Previous race: 2020 Alsco 300 (Kentucky)	NASCAR Xfinity Series; 2020 season	Next race: 2020 Kansas Lottery 250
