= 2020 Kansas Lottery 250 =

NASCAR Xfinity Series race

Race details
- Race 17 of 33 in the 2020 NASCAR Xfinity Series season
- Date: July 25, 2020
- Location: Kansas Speedway in Kansas City, Kansas
- Course: Permanent racing facility
- Course length: 1.5 miles (2.414 km)
- Distance: 175 laps, 262.5 mi (422.453 km)
- Scheduled distance: 167 laps, 250.5 mi (403.141 km)

Pole position
Driver	Michael Annett	JR Motorsports
- Grid positions set by ballot

Most laps led
Driver	Austin Cindric	Team Penske
- Laps: 131

Winner
No. 19	Brandon Jones	Joe Gibbs Racing

Television in the United States
- Network: NBCSN
- Announcers: Rick Allen, Steve Letarte, Jeff Burton
- Nielsen ratings: 792,000

Radio in the United States
- Radio: MRN

The 2020 Kansas Lottery 250 was a NASCAR Xfinity Series race held on July 25, 2020 at Kansas Speedway in Kansas City, Kansas. Contested over 175 laps – extended from 167 due to a double overtime finish – on the 1.5-mile (2.4 km) asphalt speedway, it was the 17th race of the 2020 NASCAR Xfinity Series season. Brandon Jones won his second race of the season.

The Kansas Lottery 250 replaced Iowa Speedway's second date for the 2020 Xfinity Series season due to the COVID-19 pandemic.

== Report ==
=== Background ===
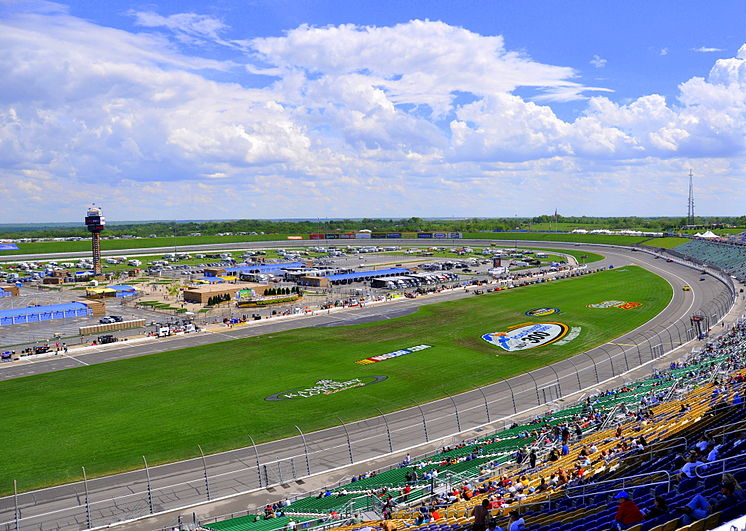
Kansas Speedway, the track where the race was held

Kansas Speedway is a 1.5-mile (2.4 km) tri-oval race track in Kansas City, Kansas. It was built in 2001, and it currently hosts two annual NASCAR race weekends. The IndyCar Series also held races at the venue until 2011. The speedway is owned and operated by the International Speedway Corporation.

The race was held without fans in attendance due to the ongoing COVID-19 pandemic.

=== Entry list ===
- (R) denotes rookie driver.
- (i) denotes driver who is ineligible for series driver points.

No.	Driver	Team	Manufacturer
0	Jeffrey Earnhardt	JD Motorsports	Chevrolet
1	Michael Annett	JR Motorsports	Chevrolet
02	Brett Moffitt (i)	Our Motorsports	Chevrolet
4	Jesse Little (R)	JD Motorsports	Chevrolet
5	Matt Mills	B. J. McLeod Motorsports	Chevrolet
6	B. J. McLeod	JD Motorsports	Chevrolet
7	Justin Allgaier	JR Motorsports	Chevrolet
07	David Starr	SS-Green Light Racing	Chevrolet
8	Daniel Hemric	JR Motorsports	Chevrolet
08	Joe Graf Jr. (R)	SS-Green Light Racing	Chevrolet
9	Noah Gragson	JR Motorsports	Chevrolet
10	Ross Chastain	Kaulig Racing	Chevrolet
11	Justin Haley	Kaulig Racing	Chevrolet
13	Chad Finchum	MBM Motorsports	Toyota
15	Ryan Vargas	JD Motorsports	Chevrolet
18	Riley Herbst (R)	Joe Gibbs Racing	Toyota
19	Brandon Jones	Joe Gibbs Racing	Toyota
20	Harrison Burton (R)	Joe Gibbs Racing	Toyota
21	Kaz Grala	Richard Childress Racing	Chevrolet
22	Austin Cindric	Team Penske	Ford
26	Colin Garrett	Sam Hunt Racing	Toyota
36	Dexter Bean	DGM Racing	Chevrolet
39	Ryan Sieg	RSS Racing	Chevrolet
44	Tommy Joe Martins	Martins Motorsports	Chevrolet
47	Kyle Weatherman	Mike Harmon Racing	Chevrolet
51	Jeremy Clements	Jeremy Clements Racing	Chevrolet
52	Kody Vanderwal (R)	Means Racing	Chevrolet
61	Timmy Hill (i)	Hattori Racing	Toyota
66	Stephen Leicht	MBM Motorsports	Toyota
68	Brandon Brown	Brandonbilt Motorsports	Chevrolet
74	Bayley Currey (i)	Mike Harmon Racing	Chevrolet
78	Vinnie Miller	B. J. McLeod Motorsports	Chevrolet
90	Alex Labbé	DGM Racing	Chevrolet
92	Josh Williams	DGM Racing	Chevrolet
93	Myatt Snider (R)	RSS Racing	Chevrolet
98	Chase Briscoe	Stewart-Haas Racing	Ford
99	Jairo Avila Jr.	B. J. McLeod Motorsports	Toyota
Official entry list

== Qualifying ==
Michael Annett was awarded the pole for the race as determined by a random draw.

=== Starting Lineup ===
Pos	No	Driver	Team	Manufacturer
1	1	Michael Annett	JR Motorsports	Chevrolet
2	19	Brandon Jones	Joe Gibbs Racing	Toyota
3	21	Kaz Grala	Richard Childress Racing	Chevrolet
4	22	Austin Cindric	Team Penske	Ford
5	20	Harrison Burton (R)	Joe Gibbs Racing	Toyota
6	98	Chase Briscoe	Stewart-Haas Racing	Ford
7	10	Ross Chastain	Kaulig Racing	Chevrolet
8	18	Riley Herbst (R)	Joe Gibbs Racing	Toyota
9	8	Daniel Hemric	JR Motorsports	Chevrolet
10	9	Noah Gragson	JR Motorsports	Chevrolet
11	7	Justin Allgaier	JR Motorsports	Chevrolet
12	11	Justin Haley	Kaulig Racing	Chevrolet
13	0	Jeffrey Earnhardt	JD Motorsports	Chevrolet
14	4	Jesse Little (R)	JD Motorsports	Chevrolet
15	07	David Starr	SS-Green Light Racing	Chevrolet
16	39	Ryan Sieg	RSS Racing	Chevrolet
17	51	Jeremy Clements	Jeremy Clements Racing	Chevrolet
18	36	Dexter Bean	DGM Racing	Chevrolet
19	90	Alex Labbé	DGM Racing	Chevrolet
20	6	B. J. McLeod	JD Motorsports	Chevrolet
21	61	Timmy Hill (i)	Hattori Racing	Toyota
22	68	Brandon Brown	Brandonbilt Motorsports	Chevrolet
23	02	Brett Moffitt (i)	Our Motorsports	Chevrolet
24	92	Josh Williams	DGM Racing	Chevrolet
25	66	Stephen Leicht	MBM Motorsports	Toyota
26	99	Jairo Avila Jr.	B. J. McLeod Motorsports	Toyota
27	74	Bayley Currey (i)	Mike Harmon Racing	Chevrolet
28	44	Tommy Joe Martins	Martins Motorsports	Chevrolet
29	52	Kody Vanderwal (R)	Means Racing	Chevrolet
30	15	Ryan Vargas	JD Motorsports	Chevrolet
31	13	Chad Finchum	MBM Motorsports	Toyota
32	5	Matt Mills	B. J. McLeod Motorsports	Chevrolet
33	93	Myatt Snider (R)	RSS Racing	Chevrolet
34	08	Joe Graf Jr. (R)	SS-Green Light Racing	Chevrolet
35	47	Kyle Weatherman	Mike Harmon Racing	Chevrolet
36	78	Vinnie Miller	B. J. McLeod Motorsports	Chevrolet
37	26	Colin Garrett	Sam Hunt Racing	Toyota
Official starting lineup

- The No. 44 of Tommy Joe Martins had to start from the rear due to unapproved adjustments.

== Race ==
=== Race results ===
==== Stage Results ====
Stage One

Laps: 40

Pos	No	Driver	Team	Manufacturer	Points
1	22	Austin Cindric	Team Penske	Ford	10
2	10	Ross Chastain	Kaulig Racing	Chevrolet	9
3	20	Harrison Burton (R)	Joe Gibbs Racing	Toyota	8
4	19	Brandon Jones	Joe Gibbs Racing	Toyota	7
5	7	Justin Allgaier	JR Motorsports	Chevrolet	6
6	11	Justin Haley	Kaulig Racing	Chevrolet	5
7	8	Daniel Hemric	JR Motorsports	Chevrolet	4
8	02	Brett Moffitt (i)	Our Motorsports	Chevrolet	0
9	18	Riley Herbst (R)	Joe Gibbs Racing	Toyota	2
10	21	Kaz Grala	Richard Childress Racing	Chevrolet	1

Stage Two

Laps: 40

Pos	No	Driver	Team	Manufacturer	Points
1	22	Austin Cindric	Team Penske	Ford	10
2	20	Harrison Burton (R)	Joe Gibbs Racing	Toyota	9
3	7	Justin Allgaier	JR Motorsports	Chevrolet	8
4	10	Ross Chastain	Kaulig Racing	Chevrolet	7
5	11	Justin Haley	Kaulig Racing	Chevrolet	6
6	19	Brandon Jones	Joe Gibbs Racing	Toyota	5
7	98	Chase Briscoe	Stewart-Haas Racing	Ford	4
8	18	Riley Herbst (R)	Joe Gibbs Racing	Toyota	3
9	8	Daniel Hemric	JR Motorsports	Chevrolet	2
10	9	Noah Gragson	JR Motorsports	Chevrolet	1

=== Final Stage Results ===
Laps: 87

Pos	Grid	No	Driver	Team	Manufacturer	Laps	Points	Status
1	2	19	Brandon Jones	Joe Gibbs Racing	Toyota	175	52	Running
2	4	22	Austin Cindric	Team Penske	Ford	175	55	Running
3	5	20	Harrison Burton (R)	Joe Gibbs Racing	Toyota	175	51	Running
4	16	39	Ryan Sieg	RSS Racing	Chevrolet	175	33	Running
5	7	10	Ross Chastain	Kaulig Racing	Chevrolet	175	48	Running
6	12	11	Justin Haley	Kaulig Racing	Chevrolet	175	42	Running
7	9	8	Daniel Hemric	JR Motorsports	Chevrolet	175	36	Running
8	1	1	Michael Annett	JR Motorsports	Chevrolet	175	29	Running
9	8	18	Riley Herbst (R)	Joe Gibbs Racing	Toyota	175	33	Running
10	11	7	Justin Allgaier	JR Motorsports	Chevrolet	175	41	Running
11	22	68	Brandon Brown	Brandonbilt Motorsports	Chevrolet	175	26	Running
12	17	51	Jeremy Clements	Jeremy Clements Racing	Chevrolet	175	25	Running
13	3	21	Kaz Grala	Richard Childress Racing	Chevrolet	175	25	Running
14	6	98	Chase Briscoe	Stewart-Haas Racing	Ford	175	27	Running
15	10	9	Noah Gragson	JR Motorsports	Chevrolet	174	23	Running
16	37	26	Colin Garrett	Sam Hunt Racing	Toyota	174	21	Running
17	13	0	Jeffrey Earnhardt	JD Motorsports	Chevrolet	174	20	Running
18	28	44	Tommy Joe Martins	Martins Motorsports	Chevrolet	174	19	Running
19	21	61	Timmy Hill (i)	Hattori Racing	Toyota	174	0	Running
20	24	92	Josh Williams	DGM Racing	Chevrolet	174	17	Running
21	19	90	Alex Labbé	DGM Racing	Chevrolet	174	16	Running
22	33	93	Myatt Snider (R)	RSS Racing	Chevrolet	173	15	Running
23	27	74	Bayley Currey (i)	Mike Harmon Racing	Chevrolet	173	0	Running
24	15	07	David Starr	SS-Green Light Racing	Chevrolet	173	13	Running
25	30	15	Ryan Vargas	JD Motorsports	Chevrolet	173	12	Running
26	32	5	Matt Mills	B. J. McLeod Motorsports	Chevrolet	171	11	Running
27	29	52	Kody Vanderwal (R)	Means Racing	Chevrolet	171	10	Running
28	34	08	Joe Graf Jr. (R)	SS-Green Light Racing	Chevrolet	171	9	Running
29	31	13	Chad Finchum	MBM Motorsports	Toyota	171	8	Running
30	36	78	Vinnie Miller	B. J. McLeod Motorsports	Chevrolet	171	7	Running
31	20	6	B. J. McLeod	JD Motorsports	Chevrolet	171	6	Running
32	26	99	Jairo Avila Jr.	B. J. McLeod Motorsports	Toyota	170	5	Running
33	14	4	Jesse Little (R)	JD Motorsports	Chevrolet	165	4	Accident
34	23	02	Brett Moffitt (i)	Our Motorsports	Chevrolet	91	0	Oil Leak
35	18	36	Dexter Bean	DGM Racing	Chevrolet	43	2	Power
36	35	47	Kyle Weatherman	Mike Harmon Racing	Chevrolet	33	1	Battery
37	25	66	Stephen Leicht	MBM Motorsports	Toyota	26	1	Transmission
Official race results

=== Race statistics ===
- Lead changes: 9 among 5 different drivers
- Cautions/Laps: 5 for 22
- Red flags: 0
- Time of race: 2 hours, 4 minutes, 37 seconds
- Average speed: 126.388 mph (203.402 km/h)

== Media ==
=== Television ===
The Kansas Lottery 250 was carried by NBCSN in the United States. Rick Allen, Steve Letarte, and Jeff Burton called the race from the booth at Charlotte Motor Speedway, with Parker Kligerman and Kelli Stavast covering pit road. Jesse Iwuji served as a driver analyst on pit road.

NBCSN
Booth announcers	Pit reporter	Driver analyst
Lap-by-lap: Rick Allen Color-commentator: Steve Letarte Color-commentator: Jeff Burton	Parker Kligerman Kelli Stavast	Jesse Iwuji

=== Radio ===
The Motor Racing Network (MRN) called the race for radio, which was simulcast on SiriusXM NASCAR Radio.

== Standings after the race ==
Drivers' Championship standings

	Pos	Driver	Points
1	1	Austin Cindric	722
1	2	Chase Briscoe	718 (-4)
	3	Noah Gragson	666 (-56)
	4	Ross Chastain	662 (-60)
	5	Justin Haley	592 (-130)
1	6	Harrison Burton (R)	587 (-135)
1	7	Justin Allgaier	586 (-136)
	8	Michael Annett	510 (-212)
	9	Brandon Jones	500 (-222)
	10	Riley Herbst (R)	410 (-312)
	11	Ryan Sieg	408 (-314)
	12	Brandon Brown	374 (-348)
Official driver's standings

- Note: Only the first 12 positions are included for the driver standings.
- . – Driver has clinched a position in the NASCAR playoffs.

Previous race: 2020 My Bariatric Solutions 300	NASCAR Xfinity Series; 2020 season	Next race: 2020 Henry 180
