= 2024 NASCAR Whelen Euro Series =

European auto racing season

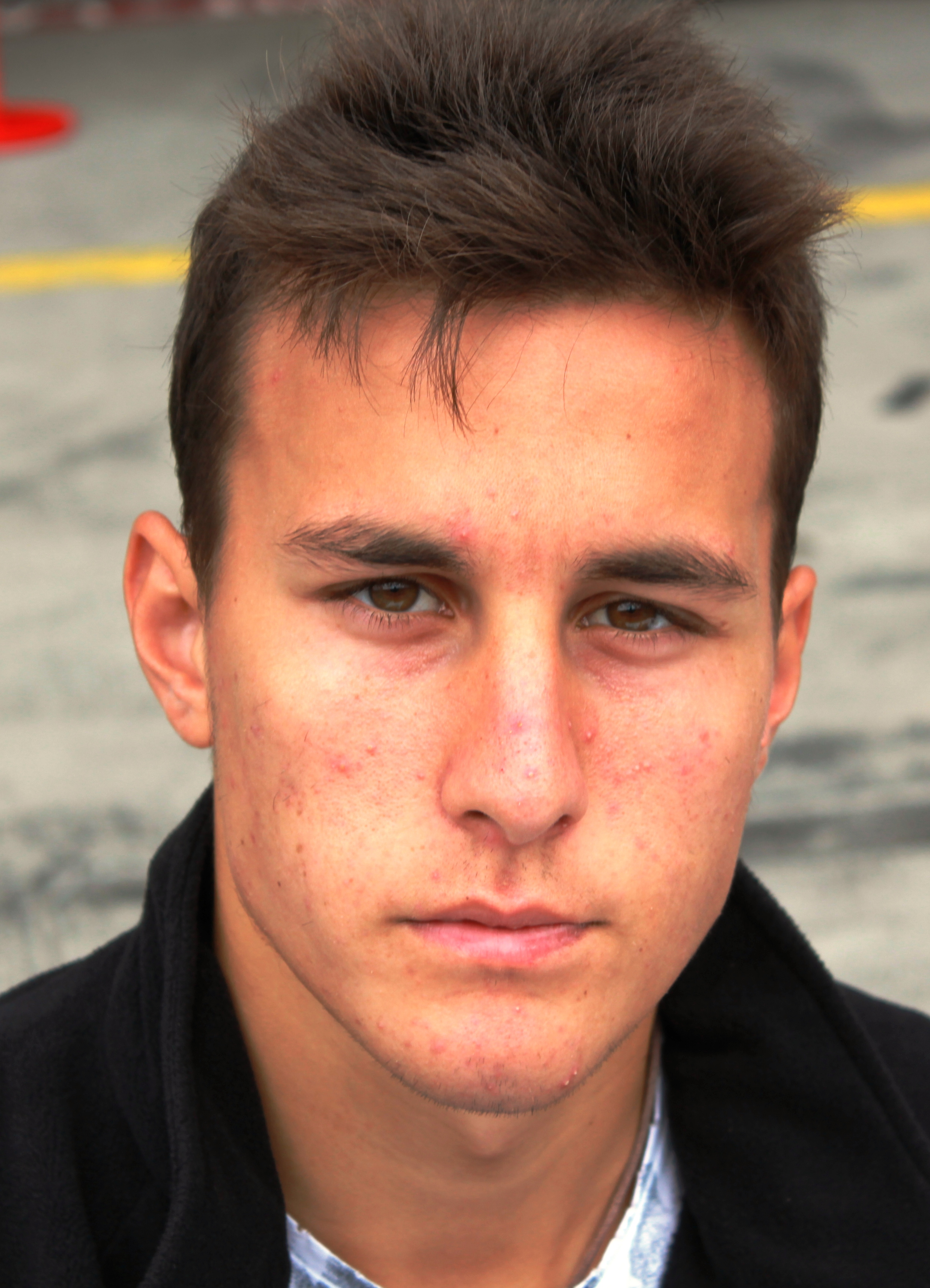
Vittorio Ghirelli, the 2024 Whelen Euro Series champion.

Locations of the circuits that hosted a NASCAR Whelen Euro Series race in 2024

The 2024 NASCAR Whelen Euro Series was the sixteenth Racecar Euro Series season, and the twelfth under the NASCAR Whelen Euro Series branding. The season started on 13 April with the Valencia NASCAR Fest at Circuit Ricardo Tormo and finished on 13 October with the EuroNASCAR Finals at Circuit Zolder.

Vittorio Ghirelli was crowned as the 2024 champion after scoring seven wins and a record breaking eleven pole positions, including all seven pole position awards from the seven qualifying sessions. Paul Jouffreau did not defend his EuroNASCAR 2 title after he moved to EuroNASCAR PRO full-time. Jouffreau's first full season in EuroNASCAR PRO saw him took two wins and finish second in the championship. Defending champion Gianmarco Ercoli was third with one race win, ahead of Liam Hezemans who finished fourth after scoring three race wins. Marc Goossens was fifth despite missing the round at Brands Hatch due to a schedule clash.

Martin Doubek became EuroNASCAR 2's first multiple-time champion by finishing sixth in the final race at Zolder. The Czech driver took six wins, the most out of any driver in the division. Patrick Schober, Jouffreau's replacement at RDV Competition, was second after scoring two race wins. Thomas Krasonis and Thomas Toffel took a career-best third and fourth place finish in the standings despite not winning a race. Claudio Remigio Cappelli finished fifth after scoring three race wins in the Playoffs. Jack Davidson and Gil Linster both took a win each at Brands Hatch and Valencia, the former becoming the first British driver to win in EuroNASCAR.

Reigning Teams champion RDV Competition successfully defended their title under the new Endurance Teams format, having taken three round wins in the season. Hendriks Motorsport was second with their #50 team while Marko Stipp Motorsport was third with the #46 team.

== Teams and drivers ==
NASCAR Whelen Euro Series released a provisional 28-car entry list for the teams participating full-time on 2 April 2024.

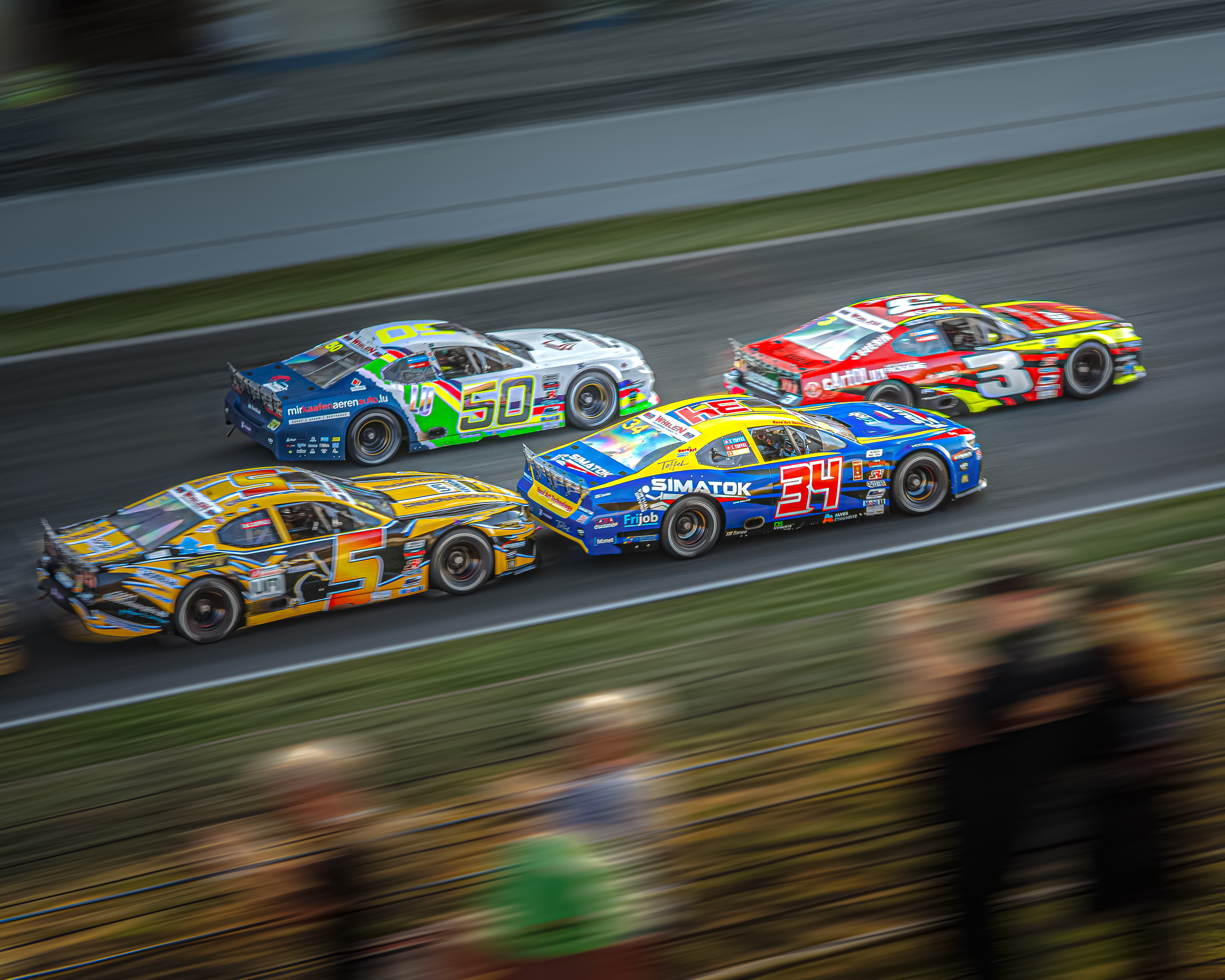
Race start at Oschersleben

=== EuroNASCAR PRO ===
Team	No.	Body Style	Race Driver	Rounds
(Italy) Academy Motorsport	1	Ford Mustang	(France) Patrick Lemarié	1
(Italy) Academy Motorsport	1	Ford Mustang	(Cyprus) Vladimiros Tziortzis	2–7
(Italy) Academy Motorsport	5	Ford Mustang	(Cyprus) Vladimiros Tziortzis	1
(France) RDV Competition	3	Ford Mustang	(France) Paul Jouffreau	All
(France) RDV Competition	16	Ford Mustang	(France) Frederic Perriat	3
(Netherlands) Hendriks Motorsport	7	Ford Mustang	(Czech Republic) Martin Doubek	All
(Netherlands) Hendriks Motorsport	50	Toyota Camry	(Netherlands) Liam Hezemans	All
(Italy) Vict Motorsport	8	Chevrolet Camaro	(Italy) Dario Caso	1–3, 5–7
(Italy) Vict Motorsport	9	Ford Mustang	(Italy) Paolo Valeri	2
(Netherlands) Race Planet Team Bleekemolen	11	Ford Mustang	(United States) Ryan Vargas	7
(Netherlands) Race Planet Team Bleekemolen	66	Chevrolet Camaro	(France) Thomas Dombrowski	1–3, 5–6
(Netherlands) Race Planet Team Bleekemolen	69	Toyota Camry	(Netherlands) Sebastiaan Bleekemolen	All
(Netherlands) Race Planet Team Bleekemolen	72	Toyota Camry	(Belgium) Marc Goossens	1–2, 4–7
(France) SpeedHouse Racing	14	Ford Mustang	(France) Ulysse Delsaux	All
(France) SpeedHouse Racing	33	Ford Mustang	(France) Lucas Lasserre	All
(France) SpeedHouse Racing	64	Ford Mustang	(Italy) Davide Dallara	2
(United Kingdom) Lux Motorsport	21	Chevrolet Camaro	(United Kingdom) Jack Davidson	1–3
(United Kingdom) Lux Motorsport	21	Chevrolet Camaro	(United Kingdom) Liam Lambert	4–7
(Belgium) PK Carsport	24	Chevrolet Camaro	(Italy) Vittorio Ghirelli	All
(Belgium) PK Carsport	66	Chevrolet Camaro	(Belgium) Anthony Kumpen	7
(France) Team FJ (Note: The entry is listed as EuroNASCAR Test Team on the entry list and the results, but is otherwise entered by Team FJ.)	25	Ford Mustang	(France) Frédéric Gabillon	7
(Italy) Double V Racing	27	Ford Mustang	(United Kingdom) Max Marzorati	2–3
(Italy) Double V Racing	27	Ford Mustang	(United Kingdom) Gordon Barnes	4
(Italy) Double V Racing	27	Ford Mustang	(Italy) Simone Giussani	5
(Germany) 3F Racing	30	Chevrolet Camaro	(United States) Ryan Vargas	1–6
(Switzerland) Race Art Technology	34	Chevrolet Camaro	(Switzerland) Thomas Toffel	All
(Italy) Club Motorsport (Note: The team originally entered the season as The Club Motorsport. They undergo a rebrand before the Vallelunga round and will enter the championship under the Club Motorsport identity from Vallelunga onwards.)	43	Chevrolet Camaro	(Italy) Riccardo Romagnoli	1–3, 5–6
(Italy) Club Motorsport	55	Chevrolet Camaro	(Italy) Fabrizio Armetta	1–3, 5–7
(Germany) Marko Stipp Motorsport	46	Chevrolet Camaro	(Greece) Thomas Krasonis	All
(Germany) Marko Stipp Motorsport	47	Chevrolet Camaro	(France) Victor Neumann	All
(Germany) Marko Stipp Motorsport	48	Chevrolet Camaro	(United States) Nick Strickler	All
(Italy) CAAL Racing	54	Chevrolet Camaro	(Italy) Gianmarco Ercoli	All
(Italy) CAAL Racing	88	Chevrolet Camaro	(Italy) Max Lanza	1–3, 5–7
Team Japan Needs24	74	Toyota Camry	(Japan) Kenko Miura	1, 3, 7
(Germany) Bremotion	77	Chevrolet Camaro	(Germany) Julien Rehberg	2, 7
(Germany) Bremotion	77	Chevrolet Camaro	(Austria) Constantin Scholl	4, 6
(Germany) Bremotion	99	Chevrolet Camaro	(Germany) Tobias Dauenhauer	All
(Italy) Granducato Speed	90	Chevrolet Camaro	(Italy) Mario Buscemi	2

=== EuroNASCAR 2 ===
Team	No.	Body Style	Race Driver	Rounds
(Italy) Academy Motorsport	1	Ford Mustang	(France) Frederic Perriat	1
(Italy) Academy Motorsport	1	Ford Mustang	(Cyprus) Vladimiros Tziortzis	2
(Italy) Academy Motorsport	1	Ford Mustang	(Italy) Claudio Remigio Cappelli	3
(Italy) Academy Motorsport	1	Ford Mustang	(Italy) Federico Monti	4
(Italy) Academy Motorsport	5	Ford Mustang	(Italy) Claudio Remigio Cappelli	1–2, 4–7
(France) RDV Competition	3	Ford Mustang	(Austria) Patrick Schober	All
(France) RDV Competition	16	Ford Mustang	(France) Alain Grand	3
(Netherlands) Hendriks Motorsport	7	Ford Mustang	(Czech Republic) Martin Doubek	All
(Netherlands) Hendriks Motorsport	50	Toyota Camry	(Luxembourg) Gil Linster	All
(Italy) Vict Motorsport	8	Chevrolet Camaro	(Italy) Mario Ercoli	1–3, 5–7
(Italy) Vict Motorsport	9	Ford Mustang	(Italy) Valerio Marzi	2
(Netherlands) Race Planet Team Bleekemolen	11	Ford Mustang	(Netherlands) Reza Sardeha	1–3, 5–7
(Netherlands) Race Planet Team Bleekemolen	66	Chevrolet Camaro	(France) Thomas Dombrowski	1–6
(Netherlands) Race Planet Team Bleekemolen	69	Toyota Camry	(Netherlands) Melvin de Groot	All
(Netherlands) Race Planet Team Bleekemolen	72	Toyota Camry	(Netherlands) Michael Bleekemolen	All
(France) SpeedHouse Racing	14	Ford Mustang	(Italy) Arianna Casoli	All
(France) SpeedHouse Racing	33	Ford Mustang	(France) Florian Richard	All
(France) SpeedHouse Racing	64	Ford Mustang	(France) Eric Quintal	1
(United Kingdom) Lux Motorsport	21	Chevrolet Camaro	(United Kingdom) Jack Davidson	All
(France) Team FJ	25	Ford Mustang	(France) Arthur Roche	7
(Italy) Double V Racing	27	Ford Mustang	(Italy) Simone Giussani	All
(Germany) 3F Racing	30	Chevrolet Camaro	(United States) Ryan Vargas	4
(Switzerland) Race Art Technology	34	Chevrolet Camaro	(Switzerland) Thomas Toffel	All
(Italy) Club Motorsport	43	Chevrolet Camaro	(Italy) Giovanni Faraonio	3, 6
(Italy) Club Motorsport	55	Chevrolet Camaro	(United Kingdom) Gordon Barnes	3, 6
(Italy) Club Motorsport	55	Chevrolet Camaro	(Belgium) Andres Beers	7
(Germany) Marko Stipp Motorsport	46	Chevrolet Camaro	(Greece) Thomas Krasonis	All
(Germany) Marko Stipp Motorsport	47	Chevrolet Camaro	(France) Victor Neumann	All
(Germany) Marko Stipp Motorsport	48	Chevrolet Camaro	(United States) Nick Strickler	All
(Italy) CAAL Racing	54	Chevrolet Camaro	(Belgium) Sven van Laere	1–3
(Italy) CAAL Racing	54	Chevrolet Camaro	(Italy) Luli del Castello	5–7
(Italy) CAAL Racing	88	Chevrolet Camaro	(Italy) Roberto Benedetti	1–3, 7
(Italy) CAAL Racing	88	Chevrolet Camaro	(Portugal) Miguel Gomes	4
(Belgium) PK Carsport	66	Chevrolet Camaro	(France) Thomas Dombrowski	7
Team Japan Needs24	74	Toyota Camry	(Japan) Kenko Miura	1, 3, 7
(Germany) Bremotion	77	Chevrolet Camaro	(Germany) Julien Rehberg	All
(Germany) Bremotion	99	Chevrolet Camaro	(Germany) Dominique Schaak	All
(Italy) Granducato Speed	90	Chevrolet Camaro	(Finland) Veeti Rajala	1–3, 5–7

=== EuroNASCAR Club Challenge ===
Team	No.	Body Style	Race Driver	Rounds
(Italy) Academy Motorsport	1	Ford Mustang	(Italy) Federico Monti	1–3
(France) RDV Competition	3	Ford Mustang	(France) Yann Schar	2
(Netherlands) Race Planet Team Bleekemolen	11	Ford Mustang	(Netherlands) Reza Sardeha	1–3
(Netherlands) Race Planet Team Bleekemolen	66	Chevrolet Camaro	(France) Thomas Dombrowski	2
(Netherlands) Race Planet Team Bleekemolen	69	Toyota Camry	(Netherlands) Sebastiaan Bleekemolen	2
(Netherlands) Race Planet Team Bleekemolen	69	Toyota Camry	(Netherlands) Melvin de Groot	2
(Netherlands) Race Planet Team Bleekemolen	72	Toyota Camry	(Belgium) Marc Goossens	2
(Netherlands) Race Planet Team Bleekemolen	72	Toyota Camry	(Netherlands) Michael Bleekemolen	2
(France) SpeedHouse Racing	14	Ford Mustang	(Austria) Andreas Kuchelbacher	1–3
(France) SpeedHouse Racing	33	Ford Mustang	(Spain) Dani Briz	1, 3
(United Kingdom) Lux Motorsport	21	Chevrolet Camaro	(Brazil) Bruno Costa	1–3
(Belgium) PK Carsport	24	Chevrolet Camaro	(Italy) Vittorio Ghirelli	1–2
(Germany) 3F Racing	30	Chevrolet Camaro	(United States) Ryan Vargas	2
(Switzerland) Race Art Technology	34	Chevrolet Camaro	(Switzerland) Edouard Fatio	1–3
(Germany) Marko Stipp Motorsport	47	Chevrolet Camaro	(France) Victor Neumann	1
(Germany) Marko Stipp Motorsport	48	Chevrolet Camaro	(United Kingdom) Gordon Barnes	1–3
(Germany) Bremotion	77	Chevrolet Camaro	(United Kingdom) Kelvin Hassell	1–3
(Italy) Granducato Speed	90	Chevrolet Camaro	(Italy) Mario Buscemi	2
(Italy) Granducato Speed	90	Chevrolet Camaro	(Finland) Veeti Rajala	3

- Pink background denotes drivers that will not score points in the division.

=== Confirmed changes ===
==== Drivers ====
- On 30 October 2023, it was announced that reigning EuroNASCAR 2 champion Paul Jouffreau will be stepping up to the EuroNASCAR PRO division for the full season in 2024. Jouffreau competed part-time in EuroNASCAR PRO in 2023, winning two races and finishing ninth in the standings.
- On 2 December 2023, Dominique Schaak announced that he will be making his first full-season appearance in the NASCAR Whelen Euro Series. He is set to compete with Bremotion's #99 Chevrolet Camaro in EuroNASCAR 2, having previously made his series debut with the same team at Oschersleben last year.
- On 9 December 2023, Thomas Krasonis announced that he will be racing with Marko Stipp Motorsport in both classes for 2024. He raced in EuroNASCAR PRO only during the 2023 season.
- On 13 January 2024, it was revealed that Jack Davidson will be switching teams from Marko Stipp Motorsport to his family-owned team Lux Motorsport for the 2024 season. Lux is currently looking for a driver to accompany Davidson as his EuroNASCAR PRO teammate in the No. 21 team.
- On 29 January 2024, it was announced that Claudio Remigio Cappelli will be switching teams from Race Art Technology to Academy Motorsport, becoming the new EuroNASCAR 2 driver for Academy's No. 5 team.
- On 30 January 2024, CAAL Racing announced that Sven van Laere will be switching teams to the No. 54 Chevrolet Camaro for the 2024 season, replacing Alberto Naska who went on to race in other competitions.
- On 1 February 2024, reigning Legend Cars Italia champion Simone Giussani was announced to be the new EuroNASCAR 2 driver of Double V Racing for the 2024 season. Giussani will replace Patrick Schober, who is switching teams to RDV Competition.
- On 3 February 2024, SpeedHouse Racing announced that Florian Richard, who finished runner-up in EuroNASCAR Club Challenge in 2023, will be promoted to EuroNASCAR 2 as the driver of the No. 33 Ford Mustang.
- On 14 February 2024, Marko Stipp Motorsport announced the signing of Victor Neumann, who will be making his full-season debut in 2024. Neumann will race the No. 47 Chevrolet Camaro on both EuroNASCAR PRO and EuroNASCAR 2.
- On 6 March 2024, 3F Racing announced that Ryan Vargas will be competing in the NASCAR Whelen Euro Series in 2024. Vargas will be racing in the EuroNASCAR PRO class and is due to be partnered with several "guest drivers" that will be taking part in EuroNASCAR 2.
- On 9 March 2024, it was announced that Nick Strickler will be racing with Marko Stipp Motorsport for the full 2024 season in both EuroNASCAR PRO and EuroNASCAR 2. Strickler had previously raced with the team in the 2023 season finale round at Circuit Zolder.
- On 22 March 2024, Anthony Kumpen revealed to Autosport.be that he will be stepping back his efforts to a part-time season with a second PK Carsport entry in 2024, stating that he will be focusing his efforts on managing his son Henri-Constant's karting career. Kumpen also revealed that Vittorio Ghirelli has been signed as his replacement in the No. 24 team in 2024. Ghirelli had previously raced with PK in the 2019 season.
- On 3 April 2024, Bremotion announced the signing of young German talent Julien Rehberg as the EuroNASCAR 2 driver of the No. 77 team. Rehberg competed in the DMV BMW 318ti Cup for the 2023 racing season.
- On 4 April 2024, SpeedHouse Racing announced that Dani Briz will be joining the team as the replacement of Florian Richard in the Club Challenge seat of the No. 33 team. They also announced that Andreas Kuchelbacher, the inaugural Club Challenge champion, would also join the team in the division for the 2024 season.
- On 5 April 2024, it was announced that Patrick Lemarié will be returning to EuroNASCAR after a year of hiatus. Lemarié will continue to race with Academy Motorsport as the driver of the No. 1 Ford Mustang in EuroNASCAR PRO.
- On 6 April 2024, it was announced that 17-year old Finnish driver Veeti Rajala is planning to make his debut in the EuroNASCAR 2 division with Granducato Speed.
- On 7 April 2024, it was announced that Iran-born Dutchman Reza Sardeha, founder of websites such as ImHalal, Dan.com and Anyone.com, will be making his full-time debut in the series. Sardeha will race the No. 11 Team Bleekemolen car in both EuroNASCAR 2 and EuroNASCAR Club Challenge.

==== Teams ====
- On 13 January 2024, Lux Motorsport announced that they will be entering NASCAR Whelen Euro Series, fielding the No. 21 Chevrolet Camaro with sponsorship from GT Omega. Lux previously competed in Mini Challenge UK from 2019 to 2022.
- Team Bleekemolen will incorporate Race Planet, a driving experience company owned by the Bleekemolen family that has been sponsoring the team since their debut season in 2019, into their entry name. The team will be officially listed as Race Planet Team Bleekemolen for the season. Team Bleekemolen's No. 69 team is also set to be running the Toyota Camry body model instead of the Ford Mustang. In addition, they would also return to a four-car team with the addition of the No. 11 team.
- Academy Motorsport will run two Ford Mustang-bodied cars for the 2024 season, having used a combination of Ford and EuroNASCAR FJ 2020 bodies since 2021. There were initially plans for the No. 5 team to run the Chevrolet Camaro body, but pre-season testing reveals that both cars are set to race the Mustang body.
- SpeedHouse Racing will be bringing back the No. 33 team for the 2024 season. The No. 33 team didn't enter a single race in 2023 despite being listed in the season preliminary Entry List. The provisional Entry List for full-time teams would reveal plans for the French team to shut down the No. 40 team and rebrand the No. 64 team into the No. 33 team for 2024. Later on 7 April 2024, it was reported that the No. 64 team would still be running, albeit as a third entry that will not compete full-time.
- Marko Stipp Motorsport will be expanding into a three-car team with the addition of the No. 47 team for Victor Neumann. United Arab Emirates based investment company AIX Investment Group will sponsor the team for the 2024 season.
- The Club Motorsport's No. 65 team will be rebranded into the No. 43 team for the 2024 season, as revealed in an Instagram post that was made by their scheme designers Giaky Design Racing Graphics.
- On 6 March 2024, 3F Racing announced their plan to compete full-time in 2024, having previously taking part in a part-time campaign in 2023.
- On 22 March 2024, PK Carsport team manager Anthony Kumpen revealed that the team will be expanding into a two-car effort once more with the addition of a currently unnumbered part-time entry for himself.
- On 28 March 2024, Bremotion announced their intention to expand into a two-car team with the addition of the No. 77 Chevrolet Camaro for 2024. The second entry will make its debut in the second round at Vallelunga.
- The announcement of the provisional Entry List for full-time teams on 2 April 2024 revealed the following changes:
  - Race Art Technology returns to a one-car entry by shutting down the No. 18 team.
  - CAAL Racing will downscale into a two-car team, retaining just the No. 54 and No. 88 teams while shutting down the No. 56 team.
  - Team Japan Needs24 is scheduled to make their full-time debut in 2024. The team initially planned to do so in 2023, but they only participated in the season opening round at Valencia while their car was borrowed by technical partner RDV Competition in EuroNASCAR Club Challenge for the season finale at Zolder.
  - Granducato Speed, an Italian team that took over the assets of Bulgarian Team, joins the series as a debutant.

==== Mid-season changes ====
- Marc Goossens missed the NASCAR GP UK due to a schedule clash with his duties as both the team manager of Red Ant Racing and the driver coach of Kalle Rovanperä in the Porsche Carrera Cup Benelux. He was not replaced, leaving Michael Bleekemolen as the sole driver of the No. 72 Toyota Camry at Brands Hatch.
- Roberto Benedetti missed three rounds after he suffered a fractured wrist in a crash during the NASCAR GP UK at Brands Hatch. Miguel Gomes replaced him in the No. 88 CAAL Racing Chevrolet Camaro at Raceway Venray, but he was not replaced for the rounds at Czech Republic and Germany.
- On 11 September 2024, NASCAR Whelen Euro Series reports that Sven van Laere is retiring from active competition due to medical issues. Luli del Castello, who had previously competed with CAAL Racing in 2022, replaced him for the rest of the season.
- On 10 October 2024, NASCAR Whelen Euro Series organizers Team FJ announced that they will be entering a test car during the final round at Circuit Zolder. The car will be raced by Frédéric Gabillon in EuroNASCAR PRO and Arthur Roche in EuroNASCAR 2, but neither driver will be eligible to score championship points.

== Schedule ==
The provisional calendar for the 2024 season was announced on 11 October 2023.

=== EuroNASCAR PRO ===
Round		Race title	Track	Date
1	R1	NASCAR GP Spain – Valencia NASCAR Fest	(Spain) Circuit Ricardo Tormo, Valencia	13 April
1	R2	NASCAR GP Spain – Valencia NASCAR Fest	(Spain) Circuit Ricardo Tormo, Valencia	14 April
2	R3	NASCAR GP Italy – American Festival of Rome	(Italy) Autodromo Vallelunga, Campagnano di Roma	18 May
2	R4	NASCAR GP Italy – American Festival of Rome	(Italy) Autodromo Vallelunga, Campagnano di Roma	19 May
3	R5	NASCAR GP UK – American SpeedFest 11, Powered by Lucas Oil	(United Kingdom) Brands Hatch (Indy), West Kingsdown	8 June
3	R6	NASCAR GP UK – American SpeedFest 11, Powered by Lucas Oil	(United Kingdom) Brands Hatch (Indy), West Kingsdown	9 June
4	R7	NASCAR Oval GP	(Netherlands) Raceway Venray, Venray	30 June
5	R8	NASCAR GP Czech Republic	(Czech Republic) Autodrom Most, Most	31 August
5	R9	NASCAR GP Czech Republic	(Czech Republic) Autodrom Most, Most	1 September
EuroNASCAR Playoffs
6	R10	EuroNASCAR Semi-Finals – NASCAR GP Germany	(Germany) Motorsport Arena Oschersleben, Oschersleben	21 September
6	R11	EuroNASCAR Semi-Finals – NASCAR GP Germany	(Germany) Motorsport Arena Oschersleben, Oschersleben	22 September
7	R12	EuroNASCAR Finals – NASCAR GP Belgium	(Belgium) Circuit Zolder, Heusden-Zolder	12 October
7	R13	EuroNASCAR Finals – NASCAR GP Belgium	(Belgium) Circuit Zolder, Heusden-Zolder	13 October

Oval/Speedway
Road Course/Street Circuit

=== EuroNASCAR 2 ===
Round		Race title	Track	Date
1	R1	NASCAR GP Spain – Valencia NASCAR Fest	(Spain) Circuit Ricardo Tormo, Valencia	13 April
1	R2	NASCAR GP Spain – Valencia NASCAR Fest	(Spain) Circuit Ricardo Tormo, Valencia	14 April
2	R3	NASCAR GP Italy – American Festival of Rome	(Italy) Autodromo Vallelunga, Campagnano di Roma	18 May
2	R4	NASCAR GP Italy – American Festival of Rome	(Italy) Autodromo Vallelunga, Campagnano di Roma	19 May
3	R5	NASCAR GP UK – American SpeedFest 11, Powered by Lucas Oil	(United Kingdom) Brands Hatch (Indy), West Kingsdown	8 June
3	R6	NASCAR GP UK – American SpeedFest 11, Powered by Lucas Oil	(United Kingdom) Brands Hatch (Indy), West Kingsdown	9 June
4	R7	NASCAR Oval GP	(Netherlands) Raceway Venray, Venray	29 June
5	R8	NASCAR GP Czech Republic	(Czech Republic) Autodrom Most, Most	31 August
5	R9	NASCAR GP Czech Republic	(Czech Republic) Autodrom Most, Most	1 September
EuroNASCAR Playoffs
6	R10	EuroNASCAR Semi-Finals – NASCAR GP Germany	(Germany) Motorsport Arena Oschersleben, Oschersleben	21 September
6	R11	EuroNASCAR Semi-Finals – NASCAR GP Germany	(Germany) Motorsport Arena Oschersleben, Oschersleben	22 September
7	R12	EuroNASCAR Finals – NASCAR GP Belgium	(Belgium) Circuit Zolder, Heusden-Zolder	12 October
7	R13	EuroNASCAR Finals – NASCAR GP Belgium	(Belgium) Circuit Zolder, Heusden-Zolder	13 October

Oval/Speedway
Road Course/Street Circuit

=== Calendar changes ===
- Raceway Venray returns to the schedule after a four-year absence. The 1/2-mile oval is set to host the fourth round of the season on 29–30 June. It was originally announced to be a doubleheader race, but a schedule update in February 2024 revealed that the round will only consist of one race per class similar to the 2019 event.
- NASCAR GP Italy and NASCAR GP UK swapped dates, with the round at Vallelunga now hosting the second round instead of the third.
- EuroNASCAR's Playoffs will be expanded into a two-round format for the first time since 2019. The rounds at Oschersleben and Zolder will host the series' double-points paying rounds. Despite this, the driver's championship retains the system used in the previous three seasons where only the best 8 results from the first 10 races will count towards the final standings alongside all results from the double-points races.

== Rule changes ==
- On 31 January 2024, NASCAR Whelen Euro Series announced that the current generation of cars will be receiving a 2024 Evo package that will be put into use starting from the season opening round at Valencia. The Evo package were made to improve drivability and driver comfort, with the following changes being implemented.
  - The front spindle has been modified to provide a better steering geometry angle.
  - A new three-point caliper brackets will be introduced to provide a stronger fitting for the brakes.
  - A new rear spring package is added to improve acceleration and traction on cornering.
  - A rally-inspired roof scoop made out of carbon fiber and a set of hood louvers will be introduced to improve cooling for both driver and the car. These changes were made to address concerns from series competitors after they encountered problems with excess heat being maintained inside the car during the 2023 NASCAR GP Italy at Vallelunga, which was highly affected by high summer temperatures in Italy.
  - A speed limiter system will be added to better control speeds on pit lane and during Full Course Yellow situations.
  - The Ford Mustang body style will receive a facelift to better match the seventh-generation Ford Mustang Dark Horse model that is currently in production.
- On 11 April 2024, NASCAR Whelen Euro Series announced the following changes to the sporting regulations:
  - Race control now has the option to increase the race length by the number of laps completed under caution. A time limit will also be introduced, with EuroNASCAR PRO races being capped to 45 minutes + 1 lap while EuroNASCAR 2 races are capped to 40 minutes + 1 lap.
  - The Teams Championship is rebranded as the Endurance Teams Championship and will now classify teams based on aggregate results. Results in lap count and race time from each entry in all races during the weekend will be added and points will be awarded based on teams that completed the most total laps with the least time possible.
  - Teams are now guaranteed to do one warm-up lap, two flying laps and one cooldown lap in Superpole. As a result, the session length will now be adjusted based on how quick the participants completed the prerequisite laps.

== Results ==
=== EuroNASCAR PRO ===
Round		Race	Pole position	Fastest lap	Most laps led	Winning driver	Winning team	Winning manufacturer
1	R1	Valencia NASCAR Fest	(Italy) Vittorio Ghirelli	(Italy) Vittorio Ghirelli	(Germany) Tobias Dauenhauer	(Italy) Vittorio Ghirelli	(Belgium) PK Carsport	Chevrolet
1	R2	Valencia NASCAR Fest	(Italy) Vittorio Ghirelli	(France) Paul Jouffreau	(Italy) Vittorio Ghirelli	(Netherlands) Liam Hezemans	(Netherlands) Hendriks Motorsport	Toyota
2	R3	American Festival of Rome	(Italy) Vittorio Ghirelli	(Italy) Vittorio Ghirelli	(Italy) Vittorio Ghirelli	(Italy) Vittorio Ghirelli	(Belgium) PK Carsport	Chevrolet
2	R4	American Festival of Rome	(Italy) Vittorio Ghirelli	(Italy) Vittorio Ghirelli	(Italy) Vittorio Ghirelli	(Italy) Vittorio Ghirelli	(Belgium) PK Carsport	Chevrolet
3	R5	American SpeedFest 11	(Italy) Vittorio Ghirelli	(Netherlands) Liam Hezemans	(Italy) Vittorio Ghirelli	(Italy) Vittorio Ghirelli	(Belgium) PK Carsport	Chevrolet
3	R6	American SpeedFest 11	(Netherlands) Liam Hezemans	(Netherlands) Liam Hezemans	(Netherlands) Liam Hezemans	(Netherlands) Liam Hezemans	(Netherlands) Hendriks Motorsport	Toyota
4	R7	NASCAR Oval GP	(Italy) Vittorio Ghirelli	(Netherlands) Liam Hezemans	(Netherlands) Liam Hezemans	(Netherlands) Liam Hezemans	(Netherlands) Hendriks Motorsport	Toyota
5	R8	NASCAR GP Czech Republic	(Italy) Vittorio Ghirelli	(France) Paul Jouffreau	(Italy) Vittorio Ghirelli	(Italy) Vittorio Ghirelli	(Belgium) PK Carsport	Chevrolet
5	R9	NASCAR GP Czech Republic	(France) Paul Jouffreau	(France) Lucas Lasserre	(France) Paul Jouffreau	(France) Paul Jouffreau	(France) RDV Competition	Ford
EuroNASCAR Playoffs
6	R10	NASCAR GP Germany	(Italy) Vittorio Ghirelli	(Italy) Vittorio Ghirelli	(Italy) Gianmarco Ercoli	(Italy) Gianmarco Ercoli	(Italy) CAAL Racing	Chevrolet
6	R11	NASCAR GP Germany	(Italy) Vittorio Ghirelli	(Netherlands) Liam Hezemans	(Italy) Vittorio Ghirelli	(Italy) Vittorio Ghirelli	(Belgium) PK Carsport	Chevrolet
7	R12	NASCAR GP Belgium	(Italy) Vittorio Ghirelli	(Italy) Vittorio Ghirelli	(Italy) Vittorio Ghirelli	(Italy) Vittorio Ghirelli	(Belgium) PK Carsport	Chevrolet
7	R13	NASCAR GP Belgium	(Italy) Vittorio Ghirelli	(France) Paul Jouffreau	(France) Paul Jouffreau	(France) Paul Jouffreau	(France) RDV Competition	Ford

=== EuroNASCAR 2 ===
Round		Race	Pole position	Fastest lap	Most laps led	Winning driver	Winning team	Winning manufacturer
1	R1	Valencia NASCAR Fest	(Luxembourg) Gil Linster	(Luxembourg) Gil Linster	(Czech Republic) Martin Doubek	(Czech Republic) Martin Doubek	(Netherlands) Hendriks Motorsport	Ford
1	R2	Valencia NASCAR Fest	(Luxembourg) Gil Linster	(Luxembourg) Gil Linster	(Luxembourg) Gil Linster	(Luxembourg) Gil Linster	(Netherlands) Hendriks Motorsport	Toyota
2	R3	American Festival of Rome	(Luxembourg) Gil Linster	(Czech Republic) Martin Doubek	(Czech Republic) Martin Doubek	(Czech Republic) Martin Doubek	(Netherlands) Hendriks Motorsport	Ford
2	R4	American Festival of Rome	(Czech Republic) Martin Doubek	(Luxembourg) Gil Linster	(Czech Republic) Martin Doubek	(Czech Republic) Martin Doubek	(Netherlands) Hendriks Motorsport	Ford
3	R5	American SpeedFest 11	(Czech Republic) Martin Doubek	(Greece) Thomas Krasonis	(Czech Republic) Martin Doubek	(Czech Republic) Martin Doubek	(Netherlands) Hendriks Motorsport	Ford
3	R6	American SpeedFest 11	(Greece) Thomas Krasonis	(United Kingdom) Jack Davidson	(United Kingdom) Jack Davidson	(United Kingdom) Jack Davidson	(United Kingdom) Lux Motorsport	Chevrolet
4	R7	NASCAR Oval GP	(Czech Republic) Martin Doubek	(Czech Republic) Martin Doubek	(Czech Republic) Martin Doubek	(Czech Republic) Martin Doubek	(Netherlands) Hendriks Motorsport	Ford
5	R8	NASCAR GP Czech Republic	(Austria) Patrick Schober	(Czech Republic) Martin Doubek	(Austria) Patrick Schober	(Austria) Patrick Schober	(France) RDV Competition	Ford
5	R9	NASCAR GP Czech Republic	(Czech Republic) Martin Doubek	(Austria) Patrick Schober	(Czech Republic) Martin Doubek	(Czech Republic) Martin Doubek	(Netherlands) Hendriks Motorsport	Ford
EuroNASCAR Playoffs
6	R10	NASCAR GP Germany	(Austria) Patrick Schober	(Austria) Patrick Schober	(Switzerland) Thomas Toffel	(Italy) Claudio Remigio Cappelli	(Italy) Academy Motorsport	Ford
6	R11	NASCAR GP Germany	(Austria) Patrick Schober	(Austria) Patrick Schober	(Austria) Patrick Schober	(Austria) Patrick Schober	(France) RDV Competition	Ford
7	R12	NASCAR GP Belgium	(Luxembourg) Gil Linster	(Switzerland) Thomas Toffel	(Luxembourg) Gil Linster	(Italy) Claudio Remigio Cappelli	(Italy) Academy Motorsport	Ford
7	R13	NASCAR GP Belgium	(Switzerland) Thomas Toffel	(Switzerland) Thomas Toffel	(Italy) Claudio Remigio Cappelli	(Italy) Claudio Remigio Cappelli	(Italy) Academy Motorsport	Ford

=== Endurance Teams Championship ===
Round	Race	Heat 1 winner	Heat 2 winner	Heat 3 winner	Heat 4 winner	Overall winner	EuroNASCAR PRO Driver	EuroNASCAR 2 Driver
1	Valencia NASCAR Fest	(Belgium) #24 PK Carsport	(Netherlands) #7 Hendriks Motorsport	(Netherlands) #50 Hendriks Motorsport	(Netherlands) #50 Hendriks Motorsport	(Switzerland) #34 Race Art Technology	(Switzerland) Thomas Toffel	(Switzerland) Thomas Toffel
2	American Festival of Rome	(Belgium) #24 PK Carsport	(Netherlands) #7 Hendriks Motorsport	(Netherlands) #7 Hendriks Motorsport	(Belgium) #24 PK Carsport	(Netherlands) #7 Hendriks Motorsport	(Czech Republic) Martin Doubek	(Czech Republic) Martin Doubek
3	American SpeedFest 11	(Belgium) #24 PK Carsport	(Netherlands) #7 Hendriks Motorsport	(Netherlands) #50 Hendriks Motorsport	(United Kingdom) #21 Lux Motorsport	(Netherlands) #50 Hendriks Motorsport	(Netherlands) Liam Hezemans	(Luxembourg) Gil Linster
4	NASCAR Oval GP	(Netherlands) #7 Hendriks Motorsport	(Netherlands) #50 Hendriks Motorsport	—N/a		(Germany) #30 3F Racing	(United States) Ryan Vargas	(United States) Ryan Vargas
5	NASCAR GP Czech Republic	(Belgium) #24 PK Carsport	(Belgium) #3 RDV Competition	(Netherlands) #7 Hendriks Motorsport	(France) #3 RDV Competition	(France) #3 RDV Competition	(France) Paul Jouffreau	(Austria) Patrick Schober
EuroNASCAR Playoffs
6	NASCAR GP Germany	(Italy) #54 CAAL Racing	(Italy) #5 Academy Motorsport	(France) #3 RDV Competition	(Belgium) #24 PK Carsport	(France) #3 RDV Competition	(France) Paul Jouffreau	(Austria) Patrick Schober
7	NASCAR GP Belgium	(Belgium) #24 PK Carsport	(Italy) #5 Academy Motorsport	(Italy) #5 Academy Motorsport	(France) #3 RDV Competition	(France) #3 RDV Competition	(France) Paul Jouffreau	(Austria) Patrick Schober

== Standings ==
Points are awarded to drivers and team using the current point system used in NASCAR Cup Series, NASCAR Xfinity Series, and NASCAR Craftsman Truck Series. The driver that gained the most positions in a race will receive 4 bonus championship points. In addition, double points are awarded for the Playoff races.

For the EuroNASCAR PRO and EuroNASCAR 2 driver's championship, only the best 8 results from the first 9 races and the results from the Playoffs at Oschersleben and Zolder will count towards the final standings. For the Club Challenge championships, points are awarded per session and the results listed from each round in the standings are the combined results. For the Teams Championship, all points will be counted with no dropped scores.

=== EuroNASCAR PRO ===
(key) Bold - Pole position awarded by fastest qualifying time (in Race 1) or by previous race's fastest lap (in Race 2). Italics - Fastest lap. * – Most laps led. ^ – Most positions gained.

Pos	Driver	(Spain) ESP		(Italy) ITA		(United Kingdom) GBR		(Netherlands) NED	(Czech Republic) CZE		(Germany) GER		(Belgium) BEL		Points
1	(Italy) Vittorio Ghirelli	**1**	**2**	**1***	**1***	**1***	(7)	**4**	**1***	2	**8**	**1***	**1***	**10**	555 (585)
2	(France) Paul Jouffreau	2^	(16)	8	7	2	6	3	2	**1***	10	2	2	1*	547 (568)
3	(Italy) Gianmarco Ercoli	5	11	2	2	5	4	2	(16)	7	1*	7	4	2	534 (555)
4	(Netherlands) Liam Hezemans	(19)	1*	9	4	6	**1***	1*	5	6	11	4	7	15	499 (517)
5	(Belgium) Marc Goossens	4	4	7	9			8	3	3	5	10	3	3	475
6	(France) Lucas Lasserre	3	5	5	(24)	3	2	13	20	4	2	5	15	22	455 (468)
7	(France) Ulysse Delsaux	6	6	21	8	8	7	16	9	(21)	4	12	12	6	452 (468)
8	(Greece) Thomas Krasonis	10	8	14	12	8	(23)	9	14	17	9	6	14	4	441 (455)
9	(Czech Republic) Martin Doubek	(22)	20	3	3	4	3	DNS^{2}	6	5	3	9	8	DNS^{5}	428 (443)
10	(United States) Ryan Vargas	11	12	12	(23)	15	10^	5	12	10	6	16	10	12	423 (437)
11	(Netherlands) Sebastiaan Bleekemolen	(20)	24^{1}	11^	10	10	9	6	4	19	7	8	6	DNS^{5}	392 (409)
12	(Cyprus) Vladimiros Tziortzis	9	22	10	(25)	9	20	12	11	8	20	11	16	7	391 (403)
13	(Germany) Tobias Dauenhauer	18*	3	4	5	(20)	5	7	8	9	22	18	24	20	373 (390)
14	(France) Victor Neumann	17	14	16	22	13	19	10	(22)	15	13	DNS^{4}	11	5	348 (363)
15	(Italy) Fabrizio Armetta	24	23	6	6	24	11		7	20	19	17	5	18	344
16	(Italy) Dario Caso	15	10^	26	21	16^	18		21	13	16	14	17	14	340
17	(Switzerland) Thomas Toffel	7	7	(23)	11	23	21	11	13	23^{1}	21	3	23	19	338 (352)
18	(Italy) Max Lanza	13	9	15	19	21	12		10	12	17	21	22	13	337
19	(United States) Nick Strickler	16	13	20	(20)	19	17	15	19	16	14	15	18	16	333 (350)
20	(Italy) Riccardo Romagnoli	23	19	13	13	17	13		23	11	12	20			248
21	(United Kingdom) Liam Lambert							18	15^	14	18	19	20	8	236
22	(France) Thomas Dombrowski	14	18	25	17	14	14		17	22	DNS^{3}	DNS^{4}			180
23	(Japan) Kenko Miura	21	15			22	15						13	9	179
24	(Germany) Julien Rehberg			17	18								9	21	127
25	(Austria) Constantin Scholl							14^			15	13			127
26	(United Kingdom) Jack Davidson	12	17	24	14^	12	22								125
27	(Belgium) Anthony Kumpen												19	11	88
28	(United Kingdom) Max Marzorati			19	16	11	24								78
29	(France) Patrick Lemarié	8	21												44
30	(France) Frederic Perriat					18	16								40
31	(Italy) Simone Giussani								18	18					38
32	(Italy) Davide Dallara			22	15										37
33	(Italy) Paolo Valeri			18	26										30
34	(United Kingdom) Gordon Barnes							17							20
	(Italy) Mario Buscemi			PO	PO										0
Ineligible for EuroNASCAR PRO driver points
	(France) Frederic Gabillon												21	17	

Notes

- ^{1} – Sebastiaan Bleekemolen and Thomas Toffel worst results were a disqualification, but neither driver can drop the disqualification from their final points count.
- ^{2} – Martin Doubek received 9 championship points despite being a non-starter.
- ^{3} – Thomas Dombrowski received 10 championship points despite being a non-starter.
- ^{4} – Victor Neumann and Thomas Dombrowski received 14 championship points despite being a non-starter.
- ^{5} – Martin Doubek and Sebastiaan Bleekemolen received 18 championship points despite being a non-starter.

=== EuroNASCAR 2 ===
(key) Bold - Pole position awarded by fastest qualifying time (in Race 1) or by previous race's fastest lap (in Race 2). Italics - Fastest lap. * – Most laps led. ^ – Most positions gained.

Pos	Driver	(Spain) ESP		(Italy) ITA		(United Kingdom) GBR		(Netherlands) NED	(Czech Republic) CZE		(Germany) GER		(Belgium) BEL		Points
1	(Czech Republic) Martin Doubek	1*	2	1*	**1***	**1***	(25)	**1***	2	**1***	2	2	2	6	568 (580)
2	(Austria) Patrick Schober	2	3	(24)	17	4	3	6	**1***	3	6	**1***	8	5	525 (537)
3	(Greece) Thomas Krasonis	20	5	4^	4	3	**(23)**	5	7	6	4	6	3	3	510 (524)
4	(Switzerland) Thomas Toffel	4	4	3	6	(23)	4	13	4	4	18*	3	7	**2**	498 (512)
5	(Italy) Claudio Remigio Cappelli	3	6	23	(DNS)^{2}	2	22	2	5	20	1	22	1	1*	481 (486)
6	(United Kingdom) Jack Davidson	8	(23)	11	18	5	1*	7	17	5	5	5	5	7	480 (494)
7	(Luxembourg) Gil Linster	**(21)**	**1***	**2**	2	6	2	16	6	18	3	2	**23***	8	475 (491)
8	(Netherlands) Melvin de Groot	23	(24)	20	3	7	6	8^	3	2	8	4	4	10	472 (485)
9	(France) Thomas Dombrowski	5	8	9	(23)	8	5	10	12	8	9	10	9	4	467 (479)
10	(France) Victor Neumann	9	11	22	19	10	19	4	9	13	7	17	10	11	408 (423)
11	(France) Florian Richard	14	12	7	9	(22)	8	12	13	15	14	8	15	18	394 (409)
12	(Netherlands) Michael Bleekemolen	13	15	(15)	10	12	7^	9	10	10	13	15	17	16	392 (414)
13	(Germany) Julien Rehberg	7	7	6	(22)	9	21	11	18	14	10	21	6	9	387 (402)
14	(United States) Nick Strickler	16	(22)	12	15	19	11	19	11	11	11	12	14	17	376 (391)
15	(Finland) Veeti Rajala	15	13	13	20	25	9		16	9	15	13	11	12	370
16	(Italy) Mario Ercoli	11	10^	21	8	20	15		8	7	23	7	19	23	366
17	(Germany) Dominique Schaak	(DNS)^{1}	18	16	11	17	13	15	15	12	12	16	21	19	353 (356)
18	(Italy) Simone Giussani	22	14	10	13	24	(DNS)^{3}	17	DNS	17	20	11	13	14	333 (335)
19	(Italy) Arianna Casoli	18	17	19	16	(21)	18	18	14	19	22	20	22	24	283 (299)
20	(Netherlands) Reza Sardeha	24	20	18	14	18	10		19	21	17	18	20	22	276
21	(Italy) Roberto Benedetti	10	9	8	21	15	24						12	15	231
22	(Italy) Luli del Castello								20	16	16	14	24	20	175
23	(Japan) Kenko Miura	6	25			11	14						25	21	152
24	(Belgium) Sven van Laere	17	16	17	12	14	12								134
25	(Italy) Giovanni Faraonio					13^	20				21	23			105
26	(United Kingdom) Gordon Barnes					DNS^{3}	17				19	19			94
27	(Belgium) Andres Beers												16	13	90
28	(Cyprus) Vladimiros Tziortzis			5	5										64
29	(Italy) Valerio Marzi			14	7^										57
30	(France) Frederic Perriat	12^	21												45
31	(France) Alain Grand					16	16								42
32	(France) Eric Quintal	19	19												36
33	(United States) Ryan Vargas							3							34
34	(Italy) Federico Monti							14							23
35	(Portugal) Miguel Gomes							20							17
Ineligible for EuroNASCAR 2 driver points
	(France) Arthur Roche												18	25	

Notes

- ^{1} – Dominique Schaak received 3 championship points despite being a non-starter.
- ^{2} – Claudio Remigio Cappelli received 5 championship points despite being a non-starter.
- ^{3} – Simone Giussani and Gordon Barnes received 2 championship points despite being a non-starter.

=== Endurance Teams Championship (Top 15) ===
Pos	No.	Team	EuroNASCAR PRO Driver(s)	EuroNASCAR 2 Driver(s)	(Spain) ESP	(Italy) ITA	(United Kingdom) GBR	(Netherlands) NED	(Czech Republic) CZE	(Germany) GER	(Belgium) BEL	Points
1	3	(France) RDV Competition	(France) Paul Jouffreau	(Austria) Patrick Schober	9	19	2	2	1	1	1	316
2	50	(Netherlands) Hendriks Motorsport	(Netherlands) Liam Hezemans	(Luxembourg) Gil Linster	11	2	1	8	5	2	11	284
3	46	(Germany) Marko Stipp Motorsport	(Greece) Thomas Krasonis	(Greece) Thomas Krasonis	6	3	19	5	9	3	3	279
4	72	(Netherlands) Race Planet Team Bleekemolen	(Belgium) Marc Goossens	(Netherlands) Michael Bleekemolen	2	5	24	6	3	8	2	273
5	48	(Germany) Marko Stipp Motorsport	(United States) Nick Strickler	(United States) Nick Strickler	12	8	10	16	8	9	6	249
6	54	(Italy) CAAL Racing	(Italy) Gianmarco Ercoli	(Belgium) Sven van Laere (Italy) Luli del Castello	8	4	4	17	12	7	14	246
7	14	(France) SpeedHouse Racing	(France) Ulysse Delsaux	(Italy) Arianna Casoli	7	9	8	14	16	10	9	241
8	33	(France) SpeedHouse Racing	(France) Lucas Lasserre	(France) Florian Richard	3	11	12	10	7	6	19	240
9	47	(Germany) Marko Stipp Motorsport	(France) Victor Neumann	(France) Victor Neumann	10	17	13	4	11	16	4	238
10	7	(Netherlands) Hendriks Motorsport	(Czech Republic) Martin Doubek	(Czech Republic) Martin Doubek	19	1	18	19	2	5	16	236
11	69	(Netherlands) Race Planet Team Bleekemolen	(Netherlands) Sebastiaan Bleekemolen	(Netherlands) Melvin de Groot	26	10	3	3	13	4	17	236
12	8	(Italy) Vict Motorsport	(Italy) Dario Caso	(Italy) Mario Ercoli	5	20	11		6	12	7	216
13	34	(Switzerland) Race Art Technology	(Switzerland) Thomas Toffel	(Switzerland) Thomas Toffel	1	12	20	7	14	14	20	215
14	99	(Germany) Bremotion	(Germany) Tobias Dauenhauer	(Germany) Dominique Schaak	14	6	9	9	4	17	21	215
15	21	(United Kingdom) Lux Motorsport	(United Kingdom) Jack Davidson (United Kingdom) Liam Lambert	(United Kingdom) Jack Davidson	18	13	17	15	10	13	10	214

== See also ==
- 2024 NASCAR Cup Series
- 2024 NASCAR Xfinity Series
- 2024 NASCAR Craftsman Truck Series
- 2024 ARCA Menards Series
- 2024 ARCA Menards Series East
- 2024 ARCA Menards Series West
- 2024 NASCAR Whelen Modified Tour
- 2024 NASCAR Canada Series
- 2024 NASCAR Mexico Series
- 2024 NASCAR Brasil Sprint Race
- 2024 CARS Tour
- 2024 SMART Modified Tour
