= Ryan Vargas =

American racing driver (born 2000)

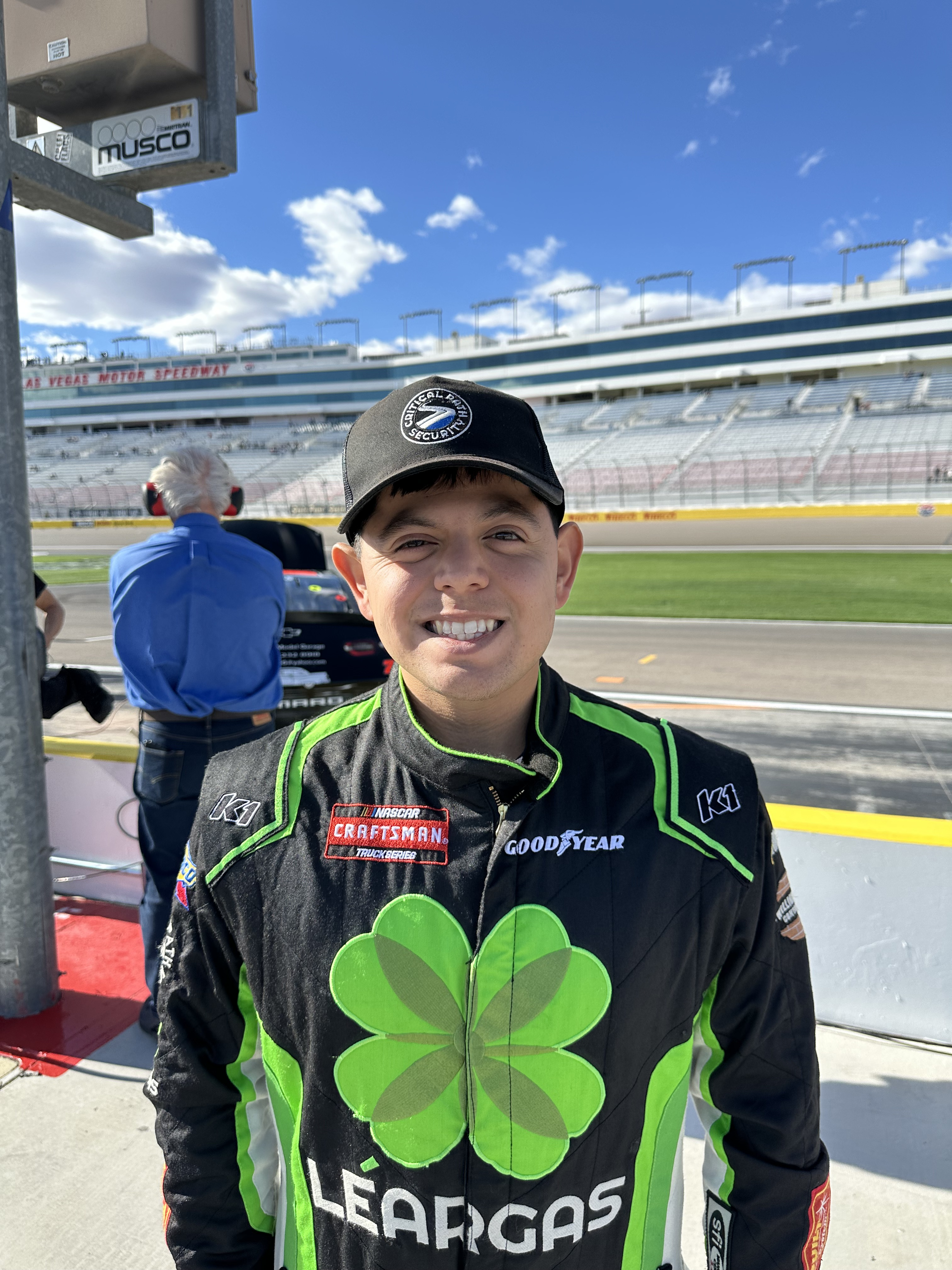
- Vargas at Las Vegas Motor Speedway in 2024
- Born: Ryan John Vargas; September 23, 2000 (age 26); La Mirada, California, U.S.
- Awards: 2016, 2017 Wendell Scott Trailblazer Award Winner; 2023 Comcast Community Champion

NASCAR O'Reilly Auto Parts Series career
- 69 races run over 5 years
- 2022 position: 26th
- Best finish: 26th (2022)
- First race: 2019 U.S. Cellular 250 (Iowa)
- Last race: 2024 Dude Wipes 250 (Martinsville)
Wins	Top tens	Poles
0	2	0

NASCAR FedEx Freight Truck Series career
- 7 races run over 1 year
- 2023 position: 32nd
- Best finish: 32nd (2023)
- First race: 2023 Fr8 208 (Atlanta)
- Last race: 2023 Love's RV Stop 250 (Talladega)
Wins	Top tens	Poles
0	1	0

NASCAR Canada Series career
- 9 races run over 1 year
- 2025 position: 8th
- Best finish: 8th (2025)
- First race: 2025 Clarington 200 (Mosport)
- Last race: 2025 NTN 125 (Delaware)
Wins	Top tens	Poles
0	6	0

ARCA Menards Series career
- 14 races run over 2 years
- Best finish: 15th (2026)
- First race: 2025 General Tire 150 (Phoenix)
- Last race: 2026 Audubon Park 100 (DuQuoin)
Wins	Top tens	Poles
0	8	0

ARCA Menards Series East career
- 16 races run over 2 years
- Best finish: 6th (2018)
- First race: 2018 New Smyrna 175 (New Smyrna)
- Last race: 2026 JR & CO. 150 (Iowa)
Wins	Top tens	Poles
0	8	0

ARCA Menards Series West career
- 3 races run over 2 years
- Best finish: 40th (2026)
- First race: 2025 General Tire 150 (Phoenix)
- Last race: 2026 Portland 112 (Portland)
Wins	Top tens	Poles
0	0	0
- Statistics up to date as of November 2, 2026.

Ryan John Vargas (born September 23, 2000) is an American professional stock car racing driver. He last competed part-time in the ARCA Menards Series, driving the No. 34/91 Chevrolet/Ford for Maples Motorsports. He has previously competed in the NASCAR Xfinity Series, the NASCAR Craftsman Truck Series, the NASCAR Whelen Euro Series, and the NASCAR Canada Series.

== Racing career ==
=== Early career ===
==== 2012–2014 ====
Vargas started racing in 2012, running Bandolero cars at Irwindale Speedway.

==== 2015 ====
Vargas later moved up to Super Stock and super late model racing in 2015.

==== 2019 ====
In 2019, Vargas returned to Irwindale Speedway for a full season of Super Late Model racing in 2019 for friend Alec Martinez out West while also running Late Model Stock Car races in the East for Lee Faulk Racing.

=== Xfinity Series ===
==== 2019 ====
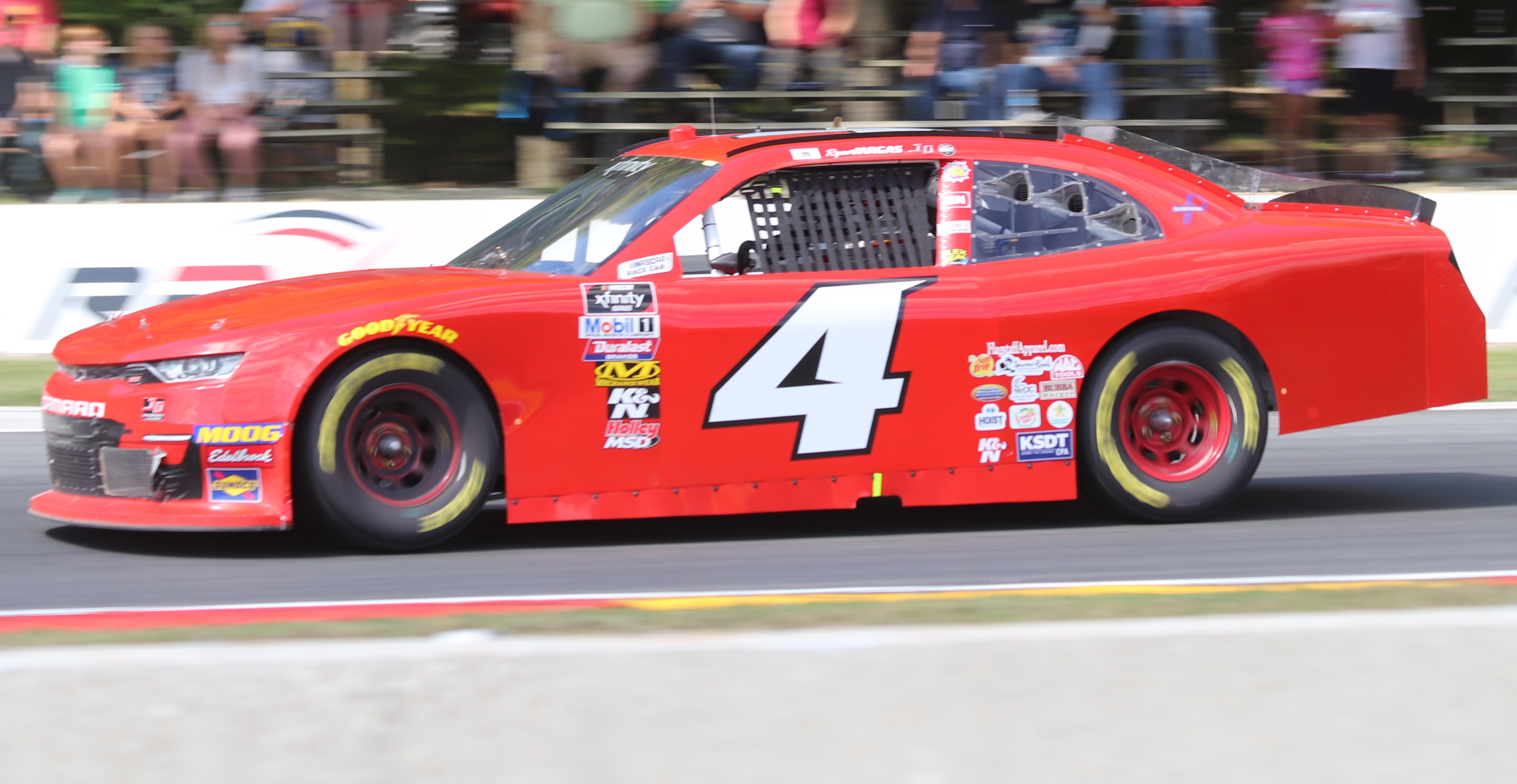
Vargas in the No. 4 JD Motorsports car at Road America in 2019.

In July 2019, Vargas made his debut in the NASCAR Xfinity Series at Iowa Speedway for JD Motorsports.

==== 2020 ====
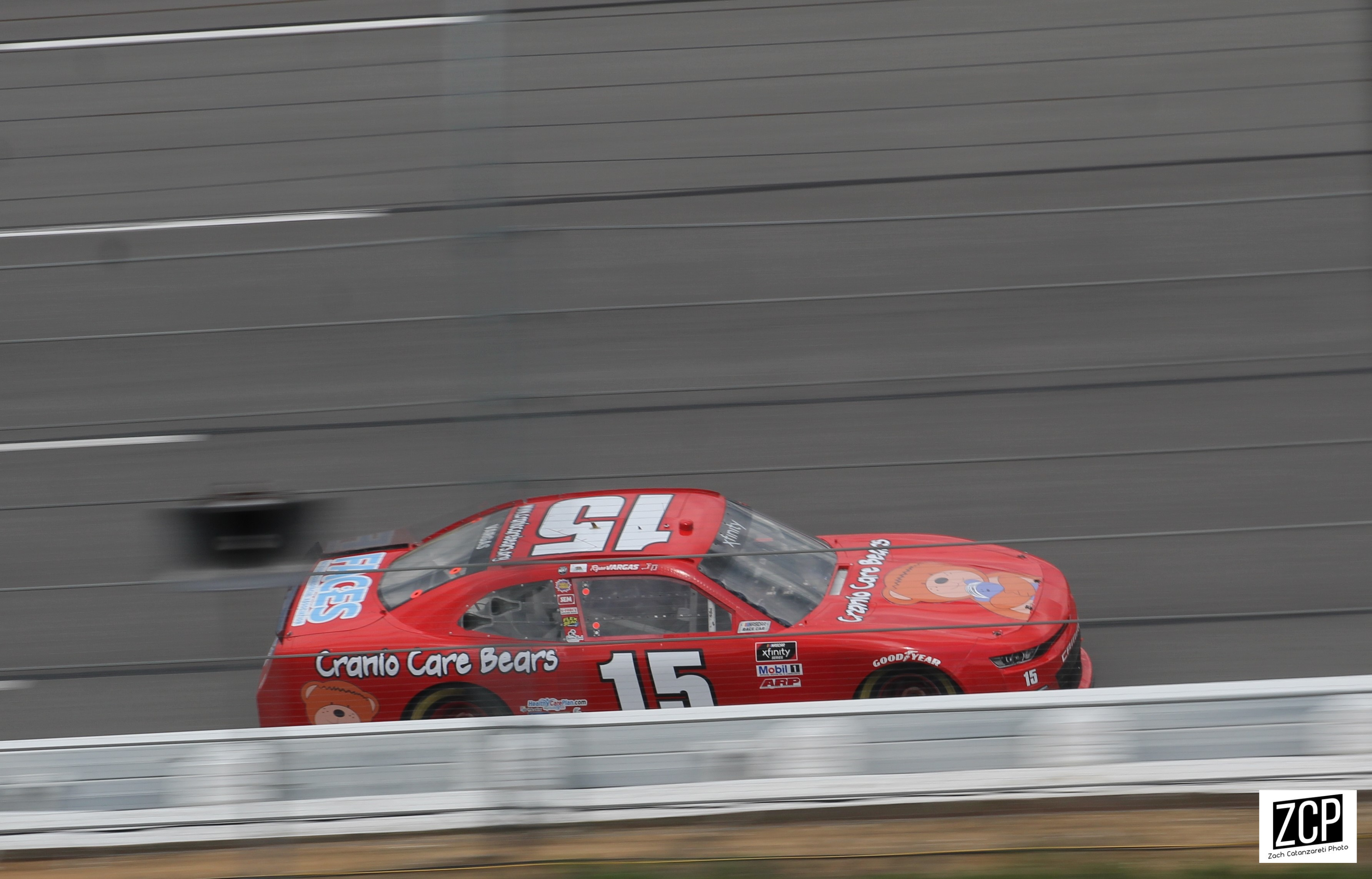
Vargas during the 2020 Pocono Green 225.

Vargas returned to the series and JD Motorsports in June 2020 on a multi-race deal. Six more races were added to Vargas' schedule in September when he picked up a six-race sponsorship from the popular social networking service TikTok.

==== 2021 ====
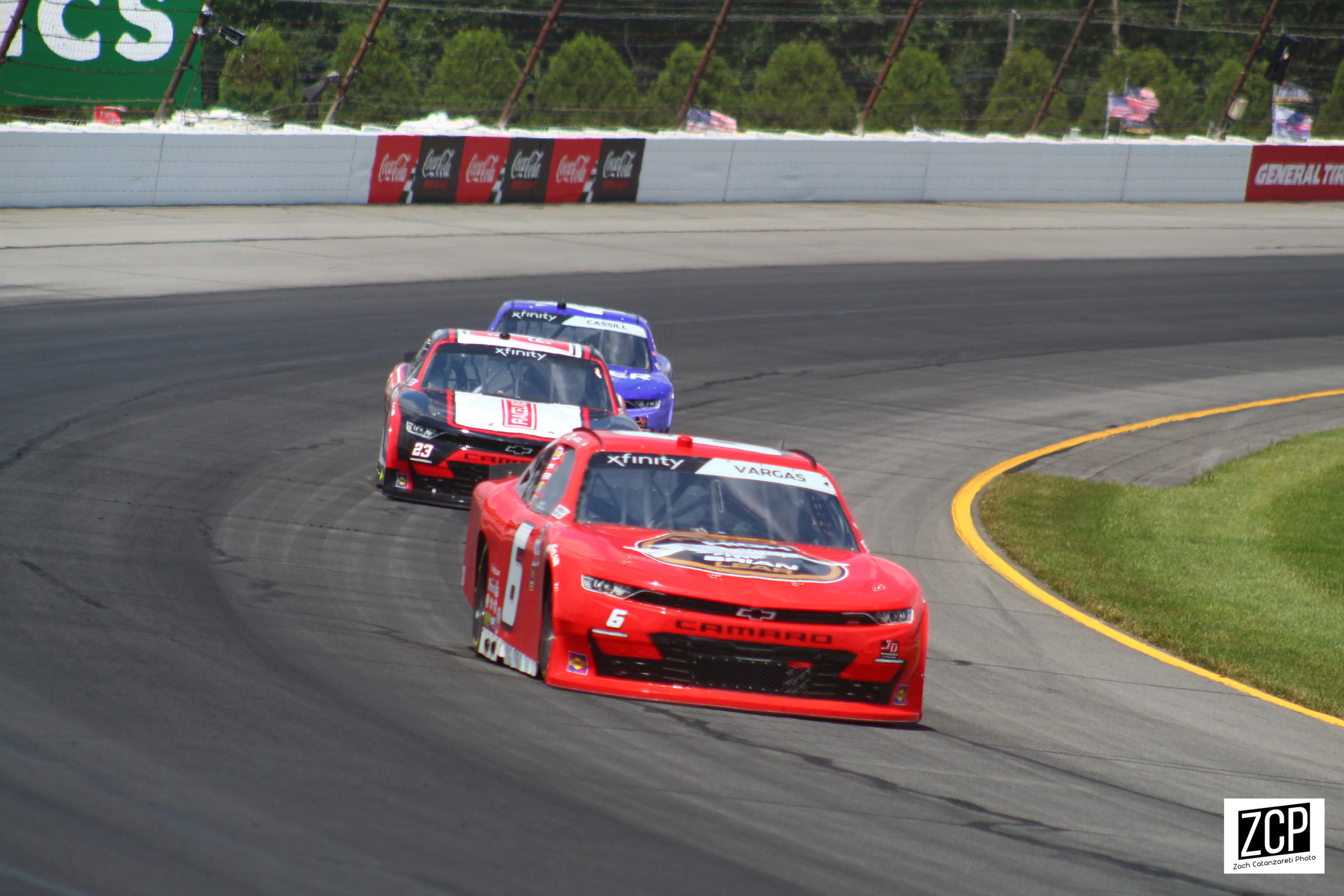
Vargas during the 2021 Pocono Green 225.

In 2021, Vargas moved to a full-time schedule with JDM in the No. 6. Ahead of the Dover race in May, Vargas switched cars with JDM teammate Landon Cassill and moved to the No. 4; the swap was spurred as the No. 6 was 37th in owner points, which would have placed it too low to qualify for later races. He was replaced by Spencer Pumpelly for the following week's race at Circuit of the Americas, but returned the following week.

==== 2022 ====
For 2022, Vargas was initially retained for a second full-time schedule with JDM in the No. 6. However, when the Portland entry list was revealed, it was shown that Vargas would instead be in the No. 47 for Mike Harmon Racing. During the second Daytona race, he finished sixth, which was his second top-ten finish. Although he would miss six rounds, he scored a position better than last year.

==== 2023 ====
In the 2023 Xfinity Series, after Vargas failed to qualify for the first three races with MHR, he decided to make the switch to the Craftsman Truck Series. He participated in seven races and got one top-ten finish. He also raced in the Whelen Euro Series in just four races, where he finished in the top-ten twice.

==== 2024 ====
In 2024, Vargas made the decision to race the full season in the Whelen Euro Series, driving for 3F Racing. He had five top-ten finishes and a highest position of fifth, finishing tenth in the standings.

=== Canada Series ===
==== 2025 ====
On March 25, 2025, it was announced that Vargas would make his debut in the NASCAR Canada Series in 2025 and would run full-time in the series in the No. 28 car for DJK Racing, but due to lack of funding, he was unable to race the full season. Even though Vargas missed two races, he finished eighth in the standings, getting seven top-ten finishes and one podium.

=== ARCA Menards Series ===
In 2025, Vargas ran four ARCA Menards Series races, driving the No. 67 for Maples Motorsports, where he earned two tenth-place finishes at Kansas Speedway and Salem Speedway.

On January 6, 2026, it was announced that Vargas will return to Maples as the anchor driver for the No. 91, while also serving as the teams operations manager. He also participated with the team in the pre-season test at Daytona International Speedway, where he set the 23rd quickest time between the two sessions held. At Daytona, he drove the No. 91 Ford and earned an eighth-place finish, his best finish in ARCA competition.

=== ARCA Menards Series East ===
==== 2018 ====
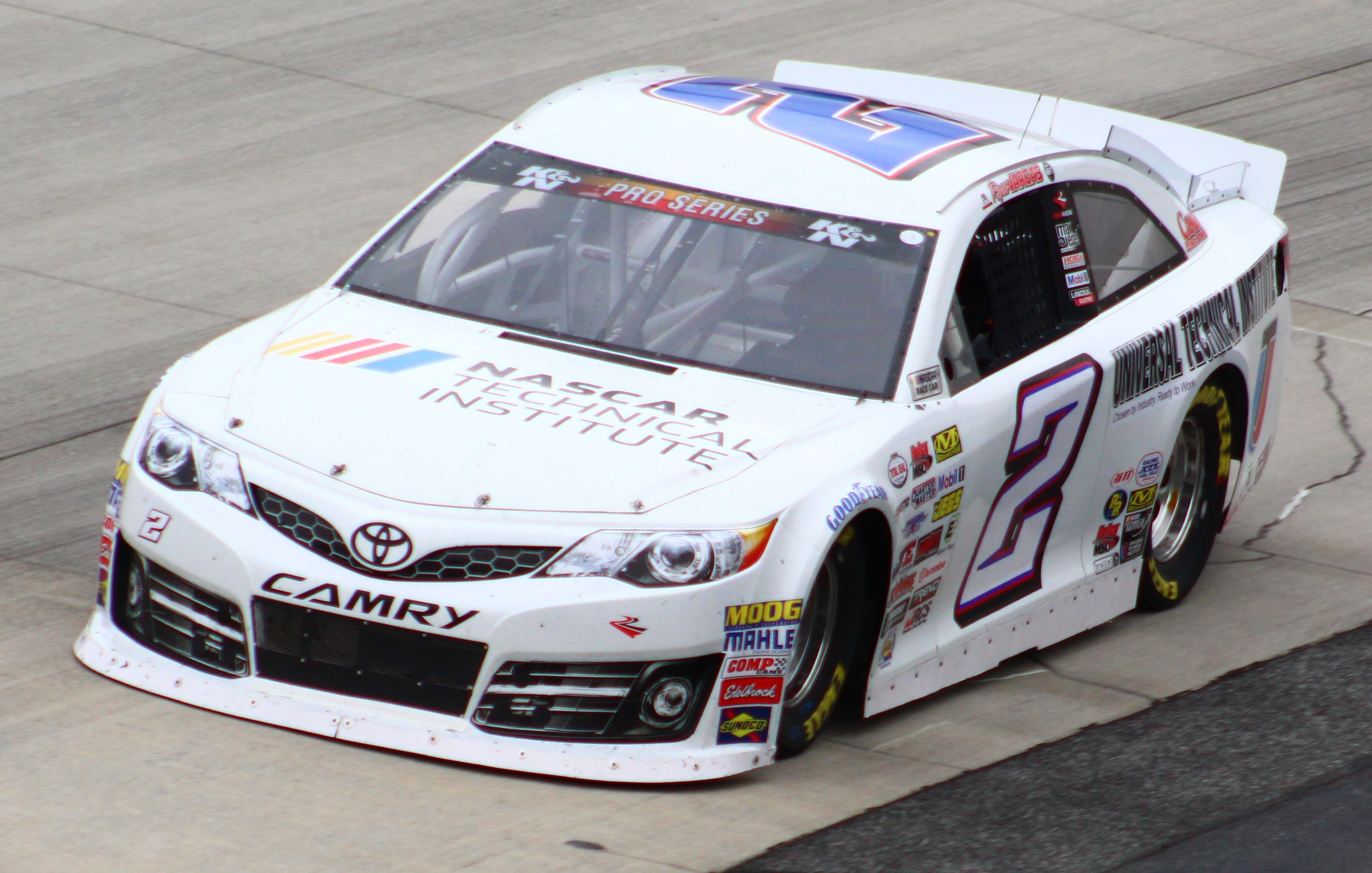
Vargas in his K&N East car at Dover International Speedway in 2018.

In 2018, Vargas signed with Rev Racing for a full season in the NASCAR K&N Pro Series East. After starting the season with finishes outside of the top ten, he finished ninth at Langley. The following round at South Boston Speedway, he crashed out after being collected in a wreck with Anthony Alfredo and Dillon Bassett on lap 22. Vargas ended the season sixth in points with six top-tens. He did not return to Rev Racing in 2019.

==== 2026 ====
Vargas returned to the East Series in 2026 at the ARCA / ARCA East combination race at Toledo. He drove the No. 91 Ford and earned a ninth-place finish. He also competed at the ARCA / ARCA East combination race at Iowa.

=== ARCA Menards Series West ===
==== 2025 ====
Vargas made his West Series debut in 2025 at the ARCA / ARCA West combination race at Phoenix. He drove the No. 67 Ford and earned a 32nd place DNF.

==== 2026 ====
Vargas returned to the West Series in 2026 at the ARCA / ARCA West combination race at Phoenix. He drove the No. 91 Ford and earned a 17th-place finish. During the FloRacing broadcast of the 2026 Sunbelt Rentals 150, it was announced that he would compete at the race in Portland in the No. 77 Toyota for Performance P-1 Motorsports, his first standalone event.

== Personal life ==
Vargas was born with craniosynostosis. He attended La Mirada High School.

=== In media ===
In 2026, Vargas joined the FloRacing crew as a guest analyst at the 2026 Sunbelt Rentals 150 with Charles Krall alongside Quinn Davis after her race.

== Motorsports career results ==
=== Stock car career summary ===
Season	Series	Team	Races	Wins	Top 5	Top 10	Points	Position
2018	NASCAR K&N Pro Series East	Rev Racing	14	0	0	6	462	6th
2019	NASCAR Xfinity Series	JD Motorsports	3	0	0	0	50	48th
2020	NASCAR Xfinity Series	JD Motorsports	9	0	0	1	114	38th
2021	NASCAR Xfinity Series	JD Motorsports	29	0	0	0	301	27th
2022	NASCAR Xfinity Series	JD Motorsports	25	0	0	1	303	26th
2022	NASCAR Xfinity Series	Mike Harmon Racing	1	0	0	0	303	26th
2023	NASCAR Whelen Euro Series – EuroNASCAR PRO	3F Racing	4	0	0	2	150	22nd
2023	NASCAR Craftsman Truck Series	On Point Motorsports	7	0	0	1	114	32nd
2023	NASCAR Xfinity Series	CHK Racing	0	0	0	0	0	NC†
2024	NASCAR Whelen Euro Series – EuroNASCAR 2	3F Racing	1	0	1	1	30	34th
2024	NASCAR Whelen Euro Series – EuroNASCAR PRO	3F Racing	11	0	1	4	423	10th
2024	NASCAR Whelen Euro Series – EuroNASCAR PRO	Race Planet Team Bleekemolen	2	0	0	1	423	10th
2024	NASCAR Xfinity Series	Jordan Anderson Racing	2	0	0	0	13	68th
2024	NASCAR Xfinity Series	Mike Harmon Racing	2	0	0	0	13	68th
2025	NASCAR Euro Series – EuroNASCAR PRO	Marko Stipp Motorsport	2	0	0	0	100	26th
2025	NASCAR Canada Series	DJK Racing	9	0	3	6	303	8th
2025	ARCA Menards Series West	Maples Motorsports	1	0	0	0	12	81st
2025	ARCA Menards Series	Maples Motorsports	4	0	0	2	106	42nd
2026	ARCA Menards Series West	Maples Motorsports	1	0	0	0	49	40th
2026	ARCA Menards Series West	Performance P–1 Motorsports	1	0	0	0	49	40th
2026	ARCA Menards Series East	Maples Motorsports	2	0	0	2	73	34th
2026	ARCA Menards Series	Maples Motorsports	10	0	0	6	387	15th

^{†} As Vargas was a guest driver, he was ineligible for championship points.

=== NASCAR ===
(key) (Bold – Pole position awarded by qualifying time. Italics – Pole position earned by points standings or practice time. * – Most laps led.)

==== Xfinity Series ====
NASCAR Xfinity Series results
Year	Team	No.	Make	1	2	3	4	5	6	7	8	9	10	11	12	13	14	15	16	17	18	19	20	21	22	23	24	25	26	27	28	29	30	31	32	33	NXSC	Pts	Ref
2019	JD Motorsports	15	Chevy	DAY	ATL	LVS	PHO	CAL	TEX	BRI	RCH	TAL	DOV	CLT	POC	MCH	IOW	CHI	DAY	KEN	NHA	IOW; 17	GLN	MOH	BRI												48th	50	
2019	JD Motorsports	4	Chevy																							ROA; 18	DAR	IND	LVS	RCH	ROV	DOV	KAN	TEX	PHO; 26	HOM	48th	50	
2020	JD Motorsports	15	Chevy	DAY	LVS	CAL	PHO	DAR	CLT	BRI	ATL	HOM	HOM	TAL	POC; 13	IRC	KEN	KEN	TEX	KAN; 25	ROA	DRC	DOV	DOV	DAY												38th	114	
2020	JD Motorsports	6	Chevy																							DAR; 25	RCH	RCH	BRI	LVS	TAL; 30	ROV; 17	KAN; 34	TEX; 8	MAR; 34	PHO; 33	38th	114	
2021	JD Motorsports	6	Chevy	DAY; 18	DRC; 37	HOM; 24	LVS; 23	PHO; 30	ATL; 31	MAR; 40	TAL; 30	DAR; 27						NSH; 18	POC; 39	ROA	ATL; 14	NHA; 29	GLN	IRC	MCH; 21	DAY; 27	DAR; 25	RCH; 35	BRI; 37	LVS; 19	TAL; 33	ROV; 36	TEX; 22	KAN; 22	MAR; 32	PHO; 28	27th	301	
2021	JD Motorsports	4	Chevy										DOV; 26	COA	CLT; 16	MOH; 18	TEX; 24																				27th	301	
2022	JD Motorsports	6	Chevy	DAY; 18	CAL; 35	LVS; 32	PHO; 29	ATL; 12	COA; 30	RCH; 36	MAR; 25	TAL; 20	DOV; 26	DAR; 21	TEX; 38	CLT; 26		NSH; 19		ATL; 21	NHA; 19	POC; 25	IRC	MCH; 29	GLN	DAY; 6	DAR; 27	KAN; 33	BRI	TEX	TAL; 30	ROV; 24	LVS; 28	HOM	MAR; 29	PHO	26th	303	
2022	Mike Harmon Racing	47	Chevy														PIR; 23		ROA; DNQ																		26th	303	
2023	CHK Racing	74	Chevy	DAY; DNQ	CAL; DNQ	LVS; DNQ	PHO	ATL	COA	RCH	MAR	TAL	DOV	DAR	CLT	PIR	SON	NSH	CSC	ATL	NHA	POC	ROA	MCH	IRC	GLN	DAY	DAR	KAN	BRI	TEX	ROV	LVS	HOM	MAR	PHO	N/A	0^{1}	
2024	Jordan Anderson Racing	32	Chevy	DAY	ATL	LVS	PHO; 37	COA	RCH; 38																												68th	13	
2024	Mike Harmon Racing	74	Chevy							MAR; DNQ	TEX	TAL	DOV	DAR	CLT	PIR	SON	IOW	NHA	NSH	CSC	POC	IND	MCH	DAY	DAR	ATL	GLN	BRI	KAN; 29	TAL	ROV	LVS; 34	HOM	MAR	PHO	68th	13	

==== Craftsman Truck Series ====
NASCAR Craftsman Truck Series results
Year	Team	No.	Make	1	2	3	4	5	6	7	8	9	10	11	12	13	14	15	16	17	18	19	20	21	22	23	NCTC	Pts	Ref
2023	On Point Motorsports	30	Toyota	DAY	LVS	ATL; 14	COA	TEX; 8	BRD	MAR	KAN	DAR; 27	NWS	CLT; 26	GTW	NSH	MOH; 23	POC	RCH; 30	IRP	MLW	KAN	BRI	TAL; 17	HOM	PHO	32nd	114	

==== Canada Series ====
NASCAR Canada Series results
Year	Team	No.	Make	1	2	3	4	5	6	7	8	9	10	11	12	Rank	Points	Ref
2025	DJK Racing	28	Dodge	MSP; 12	RIS; 3	EDM; 6	SAS; 5	CMP; 22	ACD; 7	CTR; 27	ICAR	MSP	DEL; 8	DEL; 4	AMS	8th	303	

==== Whelen Euro Series – EuroNASCAR PRO ====
NASCAR Whelen Euro Series – EuroNASCAR PRO results
Year	Team	No.	Make	1	2	3	4	5	6	7	8	9	10	11	12	13	NWES	Pts
2023	3F Racing	30	Chevy	ESP	ESP	GBR	GBR	ITA	ITA	CZE	CZE	GER; 10	GER; 10	BEL; 15	BEL; 11		22nd	150
2024	3F Racing	30	Chevy	ESP; 11	ESP; 12	ITA; 12	ITA; 23	GBR; 15	GBR; 10	NLD; 5	CZE; 12	CZE; 10	GER; 6	GER; 16			10th	423
2024	Race Planet Team Bleekemolen	11	Ford												BEL; 10	BEL; 12	10th	423
2025	Marko Stipp Motorsport	48	Chevy	ESP	ESP	ITA	ITA	GBR	GBR	CZE	CZE	GER	GER	BEL; 13	BEL; 11		26th	100

==== Whelen Euro Series – EuroNASCAR 2 ====
NASCAR Whelen Euro Series – EuroNASCAR 2 results
Year	Team	No.	Make	1	2	3	4	5	6	7	8	9	10	11	12	13	NWES	Pts
2024	3F Racing	30	Chevy	ESP	ESP	ITA	ITA	GBR	GBR	NLD; 3	CZE	CZE	GER	GER	BEL	BEL	30th	34

=== ARCA Menards Series ===
(key) (Bold – Pole position awarded by qualifying time. Italics – Pole position earned by points standings or practice time. * – Most laps led.)

ARCA Menards Series results
Year	Team	No.	Make	1	2	3	4	5	6	7	8	9	10	11	12	13	14	15	16	17	18	19	20	AMSC	Pts	Ref
2025	Maples Motorsports	67	Chevy	DAY	PHO; 32	TAL													DSF; 18	BRI	SLM; 10	KAN	TOL	42nd	106	
2025	Maples Motorsports	67	Ford				KAN; 10	CLT	MCH	BLN	ELK	LRP	DOV	IRP	IOW	GLN	ISF	MAD						42nd	106	
2026	Maples Motorsports	91	Ford	DAY; 8	PHO; 17	KAN; 11	TAL; 8			MCH; 12	POC; 10	BER	ELK	CHI	LRP	IRP; Wth^{†}	IOW; 9	ISF	MAD					15th	387	
2026	Maples Motorsports	34	Chevy					GLN; 14																15th	387	
2026	Maples Motorsports	91	Chevy						TOL; 9											DSF; 10	SLM	BRI	KAN	15th	387	
^{†} – Practiced but replaced by Michael Maples

==== ARCA Menards Series East ====
ARCA Menards Series East results
Year	Team	No.	Make	1	2	3	4	5	6	7	8	9	10	11	12	13	14	AMSEC	Pts	Ref
2018	Rev Racing	2	Toyota	NSM; 12	BRI; 13	LGY; 9	SBO; 16	SBO; 11	MEM; 7	NJM; 6	TMP; 10	NHA; 11	IOW; 7	GLN; 18	GTW; 13	NHA; 14	DOV; 7	6th	462	
2026	Maples Motorsports	91	Chevy	HCY	CAR	NSV	TOL; 9											34th	73	
2026	Maples Motorsports	91	Ford					IRP; Wth^{†}	FRS	IOW; 9	BRI							34th	73	
^{†} – Practiced but replaced by Michael Maples

==== ARCA Menards Series West ====
ARCA Menards Series West results
Year	Team	No.	Make	1	2	3	4	5	6	7	8	9	10	11	12	13	AMSWC	Pts	Ref
2025	Maples Motorsports	67	Chevy	KER	PHO; 32	TUC	CNS	KER	SON	TRI	PIR	AAS	MAD	LVS	PHO		81st	12	
2026	Maples Motorsports	91	Ford	KER	PHO; 17	TUC	SHA	CNS	TRI	SON							40th	49	
2026	Performance P-1 Motorsports	77	Toyota								PIR; 22	AAS	MAD	LVS	PHO	KER	40th	49	

^{*} Season still in progress
^{1} Ineligible for series points
