= 2022 Crayon 200 =

18th race of the 2022 NASCAR Xfinity Series

Race details
- Race 18 of 33 of the 2022 NASCAR Xfinity Series
- Date: July 16, 2022
- Official name: 28th Annual Crayon 200
- Location: New Hampshire Motor Speedway, Loudon, New Hampshire
- Course: Permanent racing facility
- Course length: 1.058 miles (1.703 km)
- Distance: 200 laps, 211.6 mi (340.5 km)
- Scheduled distance: 200 laps, 211.6 mi (340.5 km)
- Average speed: 86.240 mph (138.790 km/h)

Pole position
Driver	Josh Berry	JR Motorsports
- Time: 29.952

Most laps led
Driver	Ty Gibbs	Joe Gibbs Racing
- Laps: 49

Winner
No. 7	Justin Allgaier	JR Motorsports

Television in the United States
- Network: USA Network
- Announcers: Rick Allen, Jeff Burton and Steve Letarte

Radio in the United States
- Radio: Performance Racing Network

The 2022 Crayon 200 was the 18th stock car race of the 2022 NASCAR Xfinity Series, and the 32nd iteration of the event. The race was held on Saturday, July 16, 2022, in Loudon, New Hampshire at New Hampshire Motor Speedway, a 1.058 miles (1.703 km) permanent oval-shaped racetrack. The race took the scheduled 200 laps to complete. At race's end, Justin Allgaier, driving for JR Motorsports, took the lead late in the race, and earned his 19th career NASCAR Xfinity Series win, along with his third of the season. To fill out the podium, Trevor Bayne, driving for Joe Gibbs Racing, and Brandon Brown, driving for his family team, Brandonbilt Motorsports, would finish in 2nd and 3rd, respectively. Landon Cassill and Noah Gragson initially finished 3rd and 4th, but were both disqualified after the race, as both of their cars were too low to the ground.

This was the debut race for the NASCAR Whelen Euro Series driver, and the former contestant on the 26th season of the CBS reality show, Survivor, Julia Landauer.

== Background ==
New Hampshire Motor Speedway is a 1.058-mile (1.703 km) oval speedway located in Loudon, New Hampshire, which has hosted NASCAR racing annually since 1990, as well as the longest-running motorcycle race in North America, the Loudon Classic. Nicknamed "The Magic Mile", the speedway is often converted into a 1.6-mile (2.6 km) road course, which includes much of the oval.

The track was originally the site of Bryar Motorsports Park before being purchased and redeveloped by Bob Bahre. The track is currently one of eight major NASCAR tracks owned and operated by Speedway Motorsports.

=== Entry list ===
#	Driver	Team	Make
1	Sam Mayer	JR Motorsports	Chevrolet
02	Brett Moffitt	Our Motorsports	Chevrolet
2	Sheldon Creed (R)	Richard Childress Racing	Chevrolet
4	Bayley Currey	JD Motorsports	Chevrolet
5	Josh Williams	B. J. McLeod Motorsports	Chevrolet
6	Ryan Vargas	JD Motorsports	Chevrolet
07	Joe Graf Jr.	SS-Green Light Racing	Ford
7	Justin Allgaier	JR Motorsports	Chevrolet
08	David Starr	SS-Green Light Racing	Ford
8	Josh Berry	JR Motorsports	Chevrolet
9	Noah Gragson	JR Motorsports	Chevrolet
10	Landon Cassill	Kaulig Racing	Chevrolet
11	Daniel Hemric	Kaulig Racing	Chevrolet
13	Akinori Ogata (i)	MBM Motorsports	Toyota
16	A. J. Allmendinger	Kaulig Racing	Chevrolet
18	Trevor Bayne	Joe Gibbs Racing	Toyota
19	Brandon Jones	Joe Gibbs Racing	Toyota
21	Austin Hill (R)	Richard Childress Racing	Chevrolet
23	Anthony Alfredo	Our Motorsports	Chevrolet
26	Derek Griffith	Sam Hunt Racing	Toyota
27	Jeb Burton	Our Motorsports	Chevrolet
31	Myatt Snider	Jordan Anderson Racing	Chevrolet
34	Kyle Weatherman	Jesse Iwuji Motorsports	Chevrolet
35	Patrick Emerling	Emerling-Gase Motorsports	Toyota
36	Alex Labbé	DGM Racing	Chevrolet
38	C. J. McLaughlin	RSS Racing	Ford
39	Ryan Sieg	RSS Racing	Ford
44	Howie DiSavino III	Alpha Prime Racing	Chevrolet
45	Julia Landauer	Alpha Prime Racing	Chevrolet
47	Bobby McCarty (i)	Mike Harmon Racing	Chevrolet
48	Ty Dillon (i)	Big Machine Racing	Chevrolet
51	Jeremy Clements	Jeremy Clements Racing	Chevrolet
54	Ty Gibbs	Joe Gibbs Racing	Toyota
66	J. J. Yeley	MBM Motorsports	Toyota
68	Brandon Brown	Brandonbilt Motorsports	Chevrolet
78	Matt Mills (i)	B. J. McLeod Motorsports	Chevrolet
88	William Byron (i)	JR Motorsports	Chevrolet
91	Mason Massey	DGM Racing	Chevrolet
98	Riley Herbst	Stewart-Haas Racing	Ford
Official entry list

== Practice ==
The only 30-minute practice session was held on Friday, July 15, at 5:00 PM EST. Ty Gibbs, driving for Joe Gibbs Racing, was the fastest in the session, with a lap of 30.166, and an average speed of 126.261 mph (203.197 km/h).

Pos.	#	Driver	Team	Make	Time	Speed
1	54	Ty Gibbs	Joe Gibbs Racing	Toyota	30.166	126.261
2	18	Trevor Bayne	Joe Gibbs Racing	Toyota	30.249	125.915
3	88	William Byron (i)	JR Motorsports	Chevrolet	30.254	125.894
Full practice results

== Qualifying ==
Qualifying was held on Friday, July 15, at 5:30 PM EST. Since New Hampshire Motor Speedway is an oval track, the qualifying system used is a single-car, single-lap system with only one round. Whoever sets the fastest time in the round wins the pole.

Josh Berry, driving for JR Motorsports, would score the pole for the race, with a lap of 29.952, and an average speed of 127.163 mph (204.649 km/h).

Pos.	#	Driver	Team	Make	Time	Speed
1	8	Josh Berry	JR Motorsports	Chevrolet	29.952	127.163
2	11	Daniel Hemric	Kaulig Racing	Chevrolet	30.007	126.930
3	7	Justin Allgaier	JR Motorsports	Chevrolet	30.031	126.829
4	54	Ty Gibbs	Joe Gibbs Racing	Toyota	30.042	126.783
5	10	Landon Cassill	Kaulig Racing	Chevrolet	30.044	126.774
6	18	Trevor Bayne	Joe Gibbs Racing	Toyota	30.071	126.660
7	16	A. J. Allmendinger	Kaulig Racing	Chevrolet	30.093	126.568
8	19	Brandon Jones	Joe Gibbs Racing	Toyota	30.127	126.425
9	9	Noah Gragson	JR Motorsports	Chevrolet	30.166	126.261
10	88	William Byron (i)	JR Motorsports	Chevrolet	30.192	126.153
11	39	Ryan Sieg	RSS Racing	Ford	30.237	125.965
12	1	Sam Mayer	JR Motorsports	Chevrolet	30.351	125.492
13	98	Riley Herbst	Stewart-Haas Racing	Ford	30.351	125.492
14	02	Brett Moffitt	Our Motorsports	Chevrolet	30.383	125.360
15	21	Austin Hill (R)	Richard Childress Racing	Chevrolet	30.401	124.285
16	23	Anthony Alfredo	Our Motorsports	Chevrolet	30.512	124.830
17	48	Ty Dillon (i)	Big Machine Racing	Chevrolet	30.514	124.821
18	2	Sheldon Creed (R)	Richard Childress Racing	Chevrolet	30.559	124.638
19	68	Brandon Brown	Brandonbilt Motorsports	Chevrolet	30.579	124.556
20	34	Kyle Weatherman	Jesse Iwuji Motorsports	Chevrolet	30.585	124.532
21	51	Jeremy Clements	Jeremy Clements Racing	Chevrolet	30.596	124.487
22	26	Derek Griffith	Sam Hunt Racing	Toyota	30.605	124.450
23	27	Jeb Burton	Our Motorsports	Chevrolet	30.665	124.207
24	4	Bayley Currey	JD Motorsports	Chevrolet	30.813	123.610
25	31	Myatt Snider	Jordan Anderson Racing	Chevrolet	30.949	123.067
26	07	Joe Graf Jr.	SS-Green Light Racing	Ford	30.952	123.055
27	36	Alex Labbé	DGM Racing	Chevrolet	31.041	122.702
28	35	Patrick Emerling	Emerling-Gase Motorsports	Toyota	31.114	122.414
29	5	Josh Williams	B. J. McLeod Motorsports	Chevrolet	31.123	122.379
30	91	Mason Massey	DGM Racing	Chevrolet	31.271	121.800
31	08	David Starr	SS-Green Light Racing	Ford	31.294	121.710
32	45	Julia Landauer	Alpha Prime Racing	Chevrolet	31.430	121.184
33	38	C. J. McLaughlin	RSS Racing	Ford	31.459	121.072
Qualified by owner's points
34	44	Howie DiSavino III	Alpha Prime Racing	Chevrolet	31.504	120.899
35	78	Matt Mills (i)	B. J. McLeod Motorsports	Chevrolet	31.661	120.299
36	6	Ryan Vargas	JD Motorsports	Chevrolet	31.665	120.284
37	13	Akinori Ogata (i)	MBM Motorsports	Toyota	32.217	118.223
38	66	J. J. Yeley	MBM Motorsports	Toyota	-	-
Failed to qualify
39	47	Bobby McCarty (i)	Mike Harmon Racing	Chevrolet	31.679	120.231
Official qualifying results
Official starting lineup

== Race results ==
Stage 1 Laps: 45

Pos.	#	Driver	Team	Make	Pts
1	39	Ryan Sieg	RSS Racing	Ford	10
2	54	Ty Gibbs	Joe Gibbs Racing	Toyota	9
3	16	A. J. Allmendinger	Kaulig Racing	Chevrolet	8
4	88	William Byron (i)	JR Motorsports	Chevrolet	0
5	68	Brandon Brown	Brandonbilt Motorsports	Chevrolet	6
6	18	Trevor Bayne	Joe Gibbs Racing	Toyota	5
7	23	Anthony Alfredo	Our Motorsports	Chevrolet	4
8	10	Landon Cassill	Kaulig Racing	Chevrolet	3
9	9	Noah Gragson	JR Motorsports	Chevrolet	2
10	11	Daniel Hemric	Kaulig Racing	Chevrolet	1

Stage 2 Laps: 45

Pos.	#	Driver	Team	Make	Pts
1	88	William Byron (i)	JR Motorsports	Chevrolet	0
2	10	Landon Cassill	Kaulig Racing	Chevrolet	9
3	54	Ty Gibbs	Joe Gibbs Racing	Toyota	9
4	16	A. J. Allmendinger	Kaulig Racing	Chevrolet	7
5	18	Trevor Bayne	Joe Gibbs Racing	Toyota	6
6	11	Daniel Hemric	Kaulig Racing	Chevrolet	5
7	7	Justin Allgaier	JR Motorsports	Chevrolet	4
8	8	Josh Berry	JR Motorsports	Chevrolet	3
9	98	Riley Herbst	Stewart-Haas Racing	Ford	2
10	39	Ryan Sieg	RSS Racing	Ford	1

Stage 3 Laps: 110

Fin.	St	#	Driver	Team	Make	Laps	Led	Status	Pts
1	3	7	Justin Allgaier	JR Motorsports	Chevrolet	200	47	Running	44
2	6	18	Trevor Bayne	Joe Gibbs Racing	Toyota	200	17	Running	46
3	19	68	Brandon Brown	Brandonbilt Motorsports	Chevrolet	200	12	Running	38
4	21	51	Jeremy Clements	Jeremy Clements Racing	Chevrolet	200	0	Running	31
5	18	2	Sheldon Creed (R)	Richard Childress Racing	Chevrolet	200	10	Running	30
6	17	48	Ty Dillon (i)	Big Machine Racing	Chevrolet	200	0	Running	0
7	15	21	Austin Hill (R)	Richard Childress Racing	Chevrolet	200	0	Running	28
8	20	34	Kyle Weatherman	Jesse Iwuji Motorsports	Chevrolet	200	0	Running	27
9	30	91	Mason Massey	DGM Racing	Chevrolet	200	0	Running	26
10	24	4	Bayley Currey	JD Motorsports	Chevrolet	200	0	Running	25
11	31	08	David Starr	SS-Green Light Racing	Ford	200	0	Running	24
12	26	07	Joe Graf Jr.	SS-Green Light Racing	Ford	200	0	Running	23
13	33	38	C. J. McLaughlin	RSS Racing	Ford	200	0	Running	22
14	14	02	Brett Moffitt	Our Motorsports	Chevrolet	200	0	Running	21
15	12	1	Sam Mayer	JR Motorsports	Chevrolet	200	0	Running	20
16	28	35	Patrick Emerling	Emerling-Gase Motorsports	Toyota	200	0	Running	19
17	34	44	Howie DiSavino III	Alpha Prime Racing	Chevrolet	200	0	Running	18
18	22	26	Derek Griffith	Sam Hunt Racing	Toyota	198	0	Running	17
19	36	6	Ryan Vargas	JD Motorsports	Chevrolet	198	0	Running	16
20	7	16	A. J. Allmendinger	Kaulig Racing	Chevrolet	197	0	Running	30
21	4	54	Ty Gibbs	Joe Gibbs Racing	Toyota	196	49	Running	31
22	35	78	Matt Mills (i)	B. J. McLeod Motorsports	Chevrolet	192	0	Running	0
23	38	66	J. J. Yeley	MBM Motorsports	Toyota	190	0	Running	12
24	29	5	Josh Williams	B. J. McLeod Motorsports	Chevrolet	189	0	Electrical	11
25	37	13	Akinori Ogata (i)	MBM Motorsports	Toyota	169	0	Engine	0
26	10	88	William Byron (i)	JR Motorsports	Chevrolet	163	22	Electrical	0
27	27	36	Alex Labbé	DGM Racing	Chevrolet	143	0	Accident	8
28	8	19	Brandon Jones	Joe Gibbs Racing	Toyota	142	0	Accident	7
29	16	23	Anthony Alfredo	Our Motorsports	Chevrolet	138	0	Accident	10
30	13	98	Riley Herbst	Stewart-Haas Racing	Ford	133	0	Accident	7
31	8	8	Josh Berry	JR Motorsports	Chevrolet	127	11	Accident	7
32	11	39	Ryan Sieg	RSS Racing	Ford	124	10	Accident	14
33	23	27	Jeb Burton	Our Motorsports	Chevrolet	124	0	Accident	2
34	25	31	Myatt Snider	Jordan Anderson Racing	Chevrolet	124	0	Accident	1
35	2	11	Daniel Hemric	Kaulig Racing	Chevrolet	105	5	Accident	7
36	32	45	Julia Landauer	Alpha Prime Racing	Chevrolet	90	0	Accident	1
DSQ	5	10	Landon Cassill (Note: Cassill and Gragson initially finished 3rd and 4th respectively, but were both disqualified after height violations were found in post-race inspection.)	Kaulig Racing	Chevrolet	200	17	Height violation	1
DSQ	9	9	Noah Gragson	JR Motorsports	Chevrolet	200	0	Height violation	1
Official race results

== Standings after the race ==
Drivers' Championship standings

	Pos	Driver	Points
	1	A. J. Allmendinger	702
1	2	Justin Allgaier	686 (-16)
1	3	Ty Gibbs	674 (-28)
	4	Josh Berry	615 (-87)
	5	Noah Gragson	603 (-99)
	6	Austin Hill	569 (-133)
	7	Brandon Jones	537 (-165)
	8	Sam Mayer	512 (-190)
	9	Riley Herbst	493 (-209)
	10	Daniel Hemric	465 (-237)
	11	Ryan Sieg	439 (-263)
	12	Landon Cassill	422 (-280)
Official driver's standings

- Note: Only the first 12 positions are included for the driver standings.

== Notes ==
Previous race: 2022 Alsco Uniforms 250	NASCAR Xfinity Series; 2022 season	Next race: 2022 Explore the Pocono Mountains 225
