= 2022 Alsco Uniforms 300 (Charlotte) =

Thirteenth race of the 2022 NASCAR Xfinity Series

Race details
- Race 13 of 33 of the 2022 NASCAR Xfinity Series
- Date: May 28, 2022
- Official name: 45th Annual Alsco Uniforms 300
- Location: Concord, North Carolina, Charlotte Motor Speedway
- Course: Permanent racing facility
- Course length: 1.5 miles (2.4 km)
- Distance: 200 laps, 300 mi (480 km)
- Scheduled distance: 200 laps, 300 mi (480 km)
- Average speed: 117.557 mph (189.190 km/h)

Pole position
Driver	Sam Mayer	JR Motorsports
- Time: 30.018

Most laps led
Driver	Josh Berry	JR Motorsports
- Laps: 89

Winner
No. 8	Josh Berry	JR Motorsports

Television in the United States
- Network: Fox Sports 1
- Announcers: Kevin Harvick, Ryan Blaney, Joey Logano

Radio in the United States
- Radio: Motor Racing Network

The 2022 Alsco Uniforms 300 was the thirteenth stock car race of the 2022 NASCAR Xfinity Series and the 45th iteration of the event. The race was held on Saturday, May 28, 2022, in Concord, North Carolina at Charlotte Motor Speedway, a 1.5 miles (2.4 km) permanent quad-oval racetrack. The race was contested over 200 laps. At race's end, Josh Berry, driving for JR Motorsports, took the win, after an exciting battle with teammate Justin Allgaier with 80 laps to go. This was Berry's 4th career Xfinity Series win, and his second of the season. To fill out the podium, Ty Gibbs of Joe Gibbs Racing and Sam Mayer of JR Motorsports would finish second and third, respectively.

== Background ==
Charlotte Motor Speedway is a motorsport complex located in Concord, North Carolina, 13 mi (21 km) outside Charlotte. The complex features a 1.5 mi (2.4 km) quad oval track that hosts NASCAR racing including the prestigious Coca-Cola 600 on Memorial Day weekend, and the Bank of America Roval 400. The speedway was built in 1959 by Bruton Smith and is considered the home track for NASCAR with many race teams located in the Charlotte area. The track is owned and operated by Speedway Motorsports with Greg Walter as track president.

The 2,000 acres (810 ha) complex also features a state-of-the-art 0.25 mi (0.40 km) drag racing strip, ZMAX Dragway. It is the only all-concrete, four-lane drag strip in the United States and hosts NHRA events. Alongside the drag strip is a state-of-the-art clay oval that hosts dirt racing including the World of Outlaws finals among other popular racing events.

=== Entry list ===
- (R) denotes rookie driver.
- (i) denotes driver who are ineligible for series driver points.

#	Driver	Team	Make
1	Sam Mayer	JR Motorsports	Chevrolet
02	Brett Moffitt	Our Motorsports	Chevrolet
2	Sheldon Creed (R)	Richard Childress Racing	Chevrolet
4	Bayley Currey	JD Motorsports	Chevrolet
5	Ryan Preece (i)	B. J. McLeod Motorsports	Ford
6	Ryan Vargas	JD Motorsports	Chevrolet
07	Joe Graf Jr.	SS-Green Light Racing	Ford
7	Justin Allgaier	JR Motorsports	Chevrolet
08	David Starr	SS-Green Light Racing	Ford
8	Josh Berry	JR Motorsports	Chevrolet
9	Noah Gragson	JR Motorsports	Chevrolet
10	Landon Cassill	Kaulig Racing	Chevrolet
11	Daniel Hemric	Kaulig Racing	Chevrolet
13	Timmy Hill (i)	MBM Motorsports	Toyota
16	A. J. Allmendinger	Kaulig Racing	Chevrolet
18	Trevor Bayne	Joe Gibbs Racing	Toyota
19	Brandon Jones	Joe Gibbs Racing	Toyota
21	Austin Hill (R)	Richard Childress Racing	Chevrolet
23	Anthony Alfredo	Our Motorsports	Chevrolet
26	Jeffrey Earnhardt	Sam Hunt Racing	Toyota
27	Jeb Burton	Our Motorsports	Chevrolet
28	Kyle Sieg	RSS Racing	Ford
31	Myatt Snider	Jordan Anderson Racing	Chevrolet
34	Kyle Weatherman	Jesse Iwuji Motorsports	Chevrolet
35	Shane Lee	Emerling-Gase Motorsports	Toyota
36	Garrett Smithley	DGM Racing	Chevrolet
38	C. J. McLaughlin	RSS Racing	Ford
39	Ryan Sieg	RSS Racing	Ford
44	Ryan Ellis	Alpha Prime Racing	Chevrolet
45	Stefan Parsons	Alpha Prime Racing	Chevrolet
47	Brennan Poole (i)	Mike Harmon Racing	Chevrolet
48	Austin Dillon (i)	Big Machine Racing	Chevrolet
51	Jeremy Clements	Jeremy Clements Racing	Chevrolet
54	Ty Gibbs	Joe Gibbs Racing	Toyota
55	Matt Mills	B. J. McLeod Motorsports	Chevrolet
66	J. J. Yeley	MBM Motorsports	Ford
68	Brandon Brown	Brandonbilt Motorsports	Chevrolet
77	Ronnie Bassett Jr.	Bassett Racing	Chevrolet
78	Josh Williams	B. J. McLeod Motorsports	Chevrolet
91	Mason Massey	DGM Racing	Chevrolet
98	Riley Herbst	Stewart-Haas Racing	Ford
99	Nick Sanchez	B. J. McLeod Motorsports	Chevrolet
Official entry list

== Practice ==
The only 30-minute practice session was held on Friday, May 27, at 3:30 PM EST. Trevor Bayne of Joe Gibbs Racing was the fastest in the session, with a time of 30.645 seconds, and a speed of 176.211 mph (283.584 km/h).

Pos.	#	Driver	Team	Make	Time	Speed
1	18	Trevor Bayne	Joe Gibbs Racing	Toyota	30.645	176.211
2	9	Noah Gragson	JR Motorsports	Chevrolet	30.724	175.758
3	7	Justin Allgaier	JR Motorsports	Chevrolet	30.808	175.279
Full practice results

== Qualifying ==
Qualifying was held on Friday, May 27, at 4:00 PM EST. Since Charlotte Motor Speedway is an oval track, the qualifying system used is a single-car, one-lap system with only one round. Whoever sets the fastest time in the round wins the pole.

Sam Mayer of JR Motorsports scored his first career pole for the race, with a time of 30.018 seconds, and a speed of 179.892 mph (289.508 km/h).

Pos.	#	Driver	Team	Make	Time	Speed
1	1	Sam Mayer	JR Motorsports	Chevrolet	30.018	179.892
2	7	Justin Allgaier	JR Motorsports	Chevrolet	30.240	178.571
3	5	Ryan Preece (i)	B. J. McLeod Motorsports	Ford	30.261	178.448
4	8	Josh Berry	JR Motorsports	Chevrolet	30.295	178.247
5	19	Brandon Jones	Joe Gibbs Racing	Toyota	30.323	178.083
6	18	Trevor Bayne	Joe Gibbs Racing	Toyota	30.498	177.061
7	9	Noah Gragson	JR Motorsports	Chevrolet	30.518	176.945
8	16	A. J. Allmendinger	Kaulig Racing	Chevrolet	30.577	176.603
9	13	Timmy Hill (i)	MBM Motorsports	Toyota	30.659	176.131
10	11	Daniel Hemric	Kaulig Racing	Chevrolet	30.670	176.068
11	45	Stefan Parsons	Alpha Prime Racing	Chevrolet	30.676	175.033
12	10	Landon Cassill	Kaulig Racing	Chevrolet	30.684	175.987
13	48	Austin Dillon (i)	Big Machine Racing	Chevrolet	30.692	175.942
14	02	Brett Moffitt	Our Motorsports	Chevrolet	30.827	174.171
15	27	Jeb Burton	Our Motorsports	Chevrolet	30.881	173.865
16	66	J. J. Yeley	MBM Motorsports	Ford	31.147	173.371
17	6	Ryan Vargas	JD Motorsports	Chevrolet	31.160	173.299
18	2	Sheldon Creed (R)	Richard Childress Racing	Chevrolet	31.165	173.271
19	47	Brennan Poole (i)	Mike Harmon Racing	Chevrolet	31.203	173.060
20	21	Austin Hill (R)	Richard Childress Racing	Chevrolet	31.227	172.927
21	34	Kyle Weatherman	Jesse Iwuji Motorsports	Chevrolet	31.272	172.678
22	39	Ryan Sieg	RSS Racing	Ford	31.278	172.645
23	51	Jeremy Clements	Jeremy Clements Racing	Chevrolet	31.279	172.640
24	07	Joe Graf Jr.	SS-Green Light Racing	Ford	31.335	172.331
25	4	Bayley Currey	JD Motorsports	Chevrolet	31.358	172.205
26	78	Josh Williams	B. J. McLeod Motorsports	Chevrolet	31.400	171.975
27	55	Matt Mills	B. J. McLeod Motorsports	Chevrolet	31.425	171.838
28	35	Shane Lee	Emerling-Gase Motorsports	Toyota	31.465	171.619
29	44	Ryan Ellis	Alpha Prime Racing	Chevrolet	31.476	171.559
30	23	Anthony Alfredo	Our Motorsports	Chevrolet	31.507	171.390
31	99	Nick Sanchez	B. J. McLeod Motorsports	Chevrolet	31.595	170.913
32	68	Brandon Brown	Brandonbilt Motorsports	Chevrolet	31.616	170.800
33	31	Myatt Snider	Jordan Anderson Racing	Chevrolet	31.640	170.670
Qualified by owner's points
34	36	Garrett Smithley	DGM Racing	Chevrolet	31.855	169.518
35	38	C. J. McLaughlin	RSS Racing	Ford	32.081	168.324
36	54	Ty Gibbs	Joe Gibbs Racing	Toyota	-	-
37	98	Riley Herbst	Stewart-Haas Racing	Ford	-	-
38	26	Jeffrey Earnhardt	Sam Hunt Racing	Toyota	-	-
Failed to qualify
39	91	Mason Massey	DGM Racing	Chevrolet	31.796	169.833
40	08	David Starr	SS-Green Light Racing	Ford	32.740	164.936
41	77	Ronnie Bassett Jr.	Bassett Racing	Chevrolet	-	-
42	28	Kyle Sieg	RSS Racing	Ford	-	-
Official qualifying results
Official starting lineup

== Race results ==
Stage 1 Laps: 45

Pos.	#	Driver	Team	Make	Pts
1	8	Josh Berry	JR Motorsports	Chevrolet	10
2	7	Justin Allgaier	JR Motorsports	Chevrolet	9
3	9	Noah Gragson	JR Motorsports	Chevrolet	8
4	16	A. J. Allmendinger	Kaulig Racing	Chevrolet	7
5	11	Daniel Hemric	Kaulig Racing	Chevrolet	6
6	1	Sam Mayer	JR Motorsports	Chevrolet	5
7	5	Ryan Preece (i)	B. J. McLeod Motorsports	Ford	0
8	54	Ty Gibbs	Joe Gibbs Racing	Toyota	3
9	19	Brandon Jones	Joe Gibbs Racing	Toyota	2
10	02	Brett Moffitt	Our Motorsports	Chevrolet	1

Stage 2 Laps: 45

Pos.	#	Driver	Team	Make	Pts
1	7	Justin Allgaier	JR Motorsports	Chevrolet	10
2	8	Josh Berry	JR Motorsports	Chevrolet	9
3	1	Sam Mayer	JR Motorsports	Chevrolet	8
4	18	Trevor Bayne	Joe Gibbs Racing	Toyota	7
5	5	Ryan Preece (i)	B. J. McLeod Motorsports	Ford	0
6	16	A. J. Allmendinger	Kaulig Racing	Chevrolet	5
7	54	Ty Gibbs	Joe Gibbs Racing	Toyota	4
8	2	Sheldon Creed (R)	Richard Childress Racing	Chevrolet	3
9	11	Daniel Hemric	Kaulig Racing	Chevrolet	2
10	02	Brett Moffitt	Our Motorsports	Chevrolet	1

Stage 3 Laps: 110

Fin.	St	#	Driver	Team	Make	Laps	Led	Status	Pts
1	4	8	Josh Berry	JR Motorsports	Chevrolet	200	89	Running	59
2	36	54	Ty Gibbs	Joe Gibbs Racing	Toyota	200	0	Running	42
3	1	1	Sam Mayer	JR Motorsports	Chevrolet	200	2	Running	47
4	7	9	Noah Gragson	JR Motorsports	Chevrolet	200	36	Running	41
5	3	5	Ryan Preece (i)	B. J. McLeod Motorsports	Ford	200	10	Running	0
6	10	11	Daniel Hemric	Kaulig Racing	Chevrolet	200	0	Running	39
7	2	7	Justin Allgaier	JR Motorsports	Chevrolet	199	63	Running	49
8	18	2	Sheldon Creed (R)	Richard Childress Racing	Chevrolet	199	0	Running	32
9	6	18	Trevor Bayne	Joe Gibbs Racing	Toyota	199	0	Running	35
10	33	31	Myatt Snider	Jordan Anderson Racing	Chevrolet	199	0	Running	27
11	14	02	Brett Moffitt	Our Motorsports	Chevrolet	199	0	Running	28
12	15	27	Jeb Burton	Our Motorsports	Chevrolet	199	0	Running	25
13	29	44	Ryan Ellis	Alpha Prime Racing	Chevrolet	199	0	Running	24
14	20	21	Austin Hill (R)	Richard Childress Racing	Chevrolet	199	0	Running	23
15	25	4	Bayley Currey	JD Motorsports	Chevrolet	198	0	Running	22
16	5	19	Brandon Jones	Joe Gibbs Racing	Toyota	198	0	Running	23
17	32	68	Brandon Brown	Brandonbilt Motorsports	Chevrolet	198	0	Running	20
18	16	66	J. J. Yeley	MBM Motorsports	Ford	198	0	Running	19
19	8	16	A. J. Allmendinger	Kaulig Racing	Chevrolet	198	0	Running	30
20	27	55	Matt Mills	B. J. McLeod Motorsports	Chevrolet	198	0	Running	17
21	34	36	Garrett Smithley	DGM Racing	Chevrolet	197	0	Running	16
22	23	51	Jeremy Clements	Jeremy Clements Racing	Chevrolet	197	0	Running	15
23	35	38	C. J. McLaughlin	RSS Racing	Ford	196	0	Running	14
24	28	35	Shane Lee	Emerling-Gase Motorsports	Toyota	196	0	Running	13
25	37	98	Riley Herbst	Stewart-Haas Racing	Ford	196	0	Running	12
26	17	6	Ryan Vargas	JD Motorsports	Chevrolet	187	0	Running	11
27	26	78	Josh Williams	B. J. McLeod Motorsports	Chevrolet	175	0	Suspension	10
28	31	99	Nick Sanchez	B. J. McLeod Motorsports	Chevrolet	173	0	Ignition	9
29	12	10	Landon Cassill	Kaulig Racing	Chevrolet	131	0	Running	8
30	11	45	Stefan Parsons	Alpha Prime Racing	Chevrolet	119	0	Accident	7
31	13	48	Austin Dillon (i)	Big Machine Racing	Chevrolet	109	0	Accident	0
32	22	39	Ryan Sieg	RSS Racing	Ford	109	0	Accident	5
33	30	23	Anthony Alfredo	Our Motorsports	Chevrolet	109	0	Accident	4
34	24	07	Joe Graf Jr.	SS-Green Light Racing	Ford	109	0	Accident	3
35	19	47	Brennan Poole (i)	Mike Harmon Racing	Chevrolet	71	0	Brakes	0
36	21	34	Kyle Weatherman	Jesse Iwuji Motorsports	Chevrolet	41	0	Accident	1
37	38	26	Jeffrey Earnhardt	Sam Hunt Racing	Toyota	41	0	Accident	1
38	9	13	Timmy Hill (i)	MBM Motorsports	Toyota	25	0	Accident	0
Official race results

== Standings after the race ==
Drivers' Championship standings

Pos	Driver	Points
1	A. J. Allmendinger	530
2	Noah Gragson	497 (-33)
3	Ty Gibbs	490 (-40)
4	Justin Allgaier	472 (-58)
5	Josh Berry	470 (-60)
6	Sam Mayer	423 (-107)
7	Brandon Jones	400 (-130)
8	Austin Hill	365 (-165)
9	Riley Herbst	362 (-168)
10	Daniel Hemric	351 (-179)
11	Landon Cassill	334 (-196)
12	Ryan Sieg	324 (-206)
Official driver's standings

- Note: Only the first 12 positions are included for the driver standings.

Previous race: 2022 SRS Distribution 250	NASCAR Xfinity Series; 2022 season	Next race: 2022 Pacific Office Automation 147
