= 3F Racing =

German-American stock car racing team

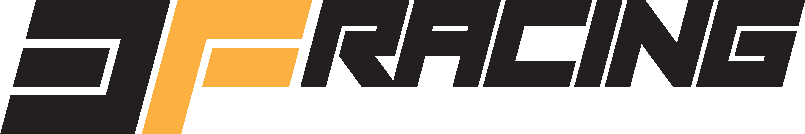
- Owner: Dennis Hirtz
- Base: Welcome, North Carolina
- Series: NASCAR Whelen Euro Series
- Race drivers: Cup Series: 30. TBA. Ryan Vargas (reserve); Euro Series: 30. Ryan Vargas
- Manufacturer: Chevrolet
- Opened: 2022

Career
- Races competed: Total: 17; Cup Series: 0 Xfinity Series: 0 NASCAR Whelen Euro Series: 17
- Drivers' Championships: Total: 0 Cup Series: 0 Xfinity Series:
- Race victories: Total: 0 Cup Series: 0 Xfinity Series:
- Pole positions: Total: 0 Cup Series: 0 Xfinity Series: 0

3F Racing is a German stock car racing team that will debut in NASCAR starting in 2024. They fielded the No. 30 Chevrolet Camaro full-time for Ryan Vargas in the NASCAR Whelen Euro Series, under a technical alliance with Dutch team Race Planet Team Bleekemolen. They also planned to compete part-time in the NASCAR Cup Series, fielding the No. 30 Chevrolet Camaro ZL1. The team was founded by the German entrepreneur Dennis Hirtz (former Marketing Director of Phoenix Racing and two other friends, who have since left the project. The team is now managed by Hirtz. 3F Racing will also have a technical alliance with Richard Childress Racing and have their shop on RCR's campus in Welcome, North Carolina.

== History ==
=== NASCAR Cup Series ===
==== Car No. 30 history ====
The team had announced their plans on July 18, 2022, but was not widely known about until August 3, 2022 when a NASCAR Reddit user discovered the team. The team's initial plans were to run the final five races of the 2022 season, starting with the Bank of America Roval 400. Hirtz stated that "Our driver for the Roval will be a two-time 24 Hours of Le Mans winner with a strong European background, and for the remaining races we will field a very experienced and well-known US American NASCAR driver." The team did not announce their drivers and sponsors for 2022 in their initial announcement. Many fans speculated that Justin Allgaier would be the driver for the oval tracks as he was a follower of the team on social media when they were first discovered. Fans also speculated that Earl Bamber would be the driver for the Roval since he has extensive sports car racing experience in Europe, including two 24 Hours of Le Mans wins (matching Hirtz's description), and he has made a NASCAR start previously (the 2020 Xfinity Series race at the Daytona Road Course).

On October 6, Hirtz told TobyChristie.com that the team would be delaying their debut until 2023. He stated that the team plans to run ten Cup Series races in 2023 with hopes to run full-time in 2024.

On July 18, 2023, it was announced that Ryan Vargas would be signed as the teams director of team and driver development, as well as being the reserve driver for the No. 30.

As of March 24, 2026, the team is still developing and active, but have not yet made a debut.

=== NASCAR Whelen Euro Series ===
On September 12, 2023, the team announced it would be fielding the No. 30 for Vargas at the GP Germany on September 23 and 24, 2023. The team finished 10th in both races.

The team followed up a few weeks later at an appearance at the GP Belgium finishing 15th and 11th in both races. The team finished 27th overall in the points standings.

On March 6, 2024, it was announced that the team will run full-time in the Euro Series in 2024, fielding the No. 30 for Vargas in the EuroNASCAR Pro category.

The team earned its first podium, on June 29, 2024, at Raceway Venray, with Vargas driving.
