= ImHalal =

Search engine with Islamic cultural values

ImHalal.com
- Website type: Search engine
- Website: imhalal.com
- Commercial: Yes
- Launched: 1 September 2009
- Current status: Closed (2011)

I'mHalal.com was a search engine built on top of social-cultural Islamic values. The search engines algorithm differed from regular search engines because the relevancy of the results was based on the culture, mindset and lifestyle of Muslims. The engine did not index content such as pornography, nudity, or anything else that might be "haram".

The founders of I'mHalal.com, launched the search engine to attract more Middle Easterners to the World Wide Web by providing all households a relevant and safe search portal to gather information and explore the web. The company was expecting a large percentage of their userbase from the Middle East. The website received mostly positive comments from Muslims, The search engine was going to opensource a part of its source by publishing an API It was subsequently closed in 2011 due to financial difficulties.

In late 2011, I'mHalal.com closed its search service due to lack of funds.
