= Thomas Toffel =

Swiss racing driver

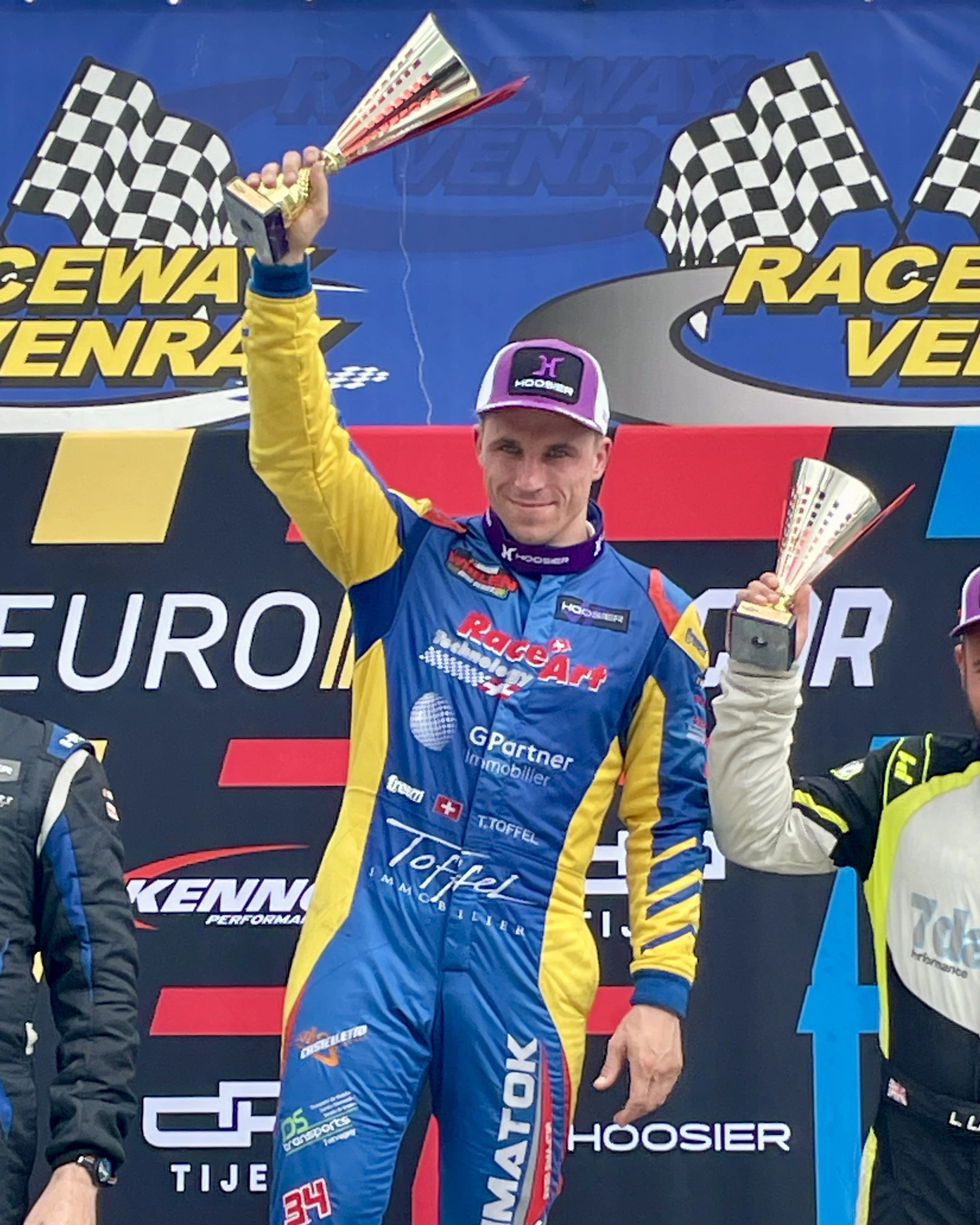
- Thomas Toffel Podium in NASCAR Euro Series
- Born: May 3, 1991 (age 35); Fribourg, Switzerland
- Occupation: Racing driver

Thomas Toffel (born May 3, 1991) is a Swiss racing driver who competes in the NASCAR Whelen Euro Series.

== Early life ==
Thomas Toffel was born on May 3, 1991, in Fribourg, Switzerland. He was introduced to pocket bike racing by his cousin and later transitioned to auto racing, where he competed in touring car and Legends car events.

== Professional career ==
In 2006, Toffel participated in the Swiss Pocket Bike Championship. In 2009, he competed in the European Championship and won the title of Swiss champion. The following year, he finished as the Swiss vice-champion before stepping away from pocket bike racing in 2011.

In 2013, Toffel transitioned to auto racing, debuting in the Mitjet Series France.

Toffel made his international racing debut in the 2015 FIM Superstock 1000 Cup season. Competing as a wildcard on Motos Vionnet's BMW S1000RR, he was forced to retire from his first Superstock 1000 race. In 2016, he joined Motos Vionnet for part-time participation in the Superstock 1000, racing a BMW S1000RR with the No. 34.

In 2022, Toffel competed in the NASCAR Whelen Euro Series with Race Art Technology, a Swiss-based team, debuting in the finals held in Rijeka, Croatia. In 2023, he transitioned to EuroNASCAR after several years of training in four-wheel racing.

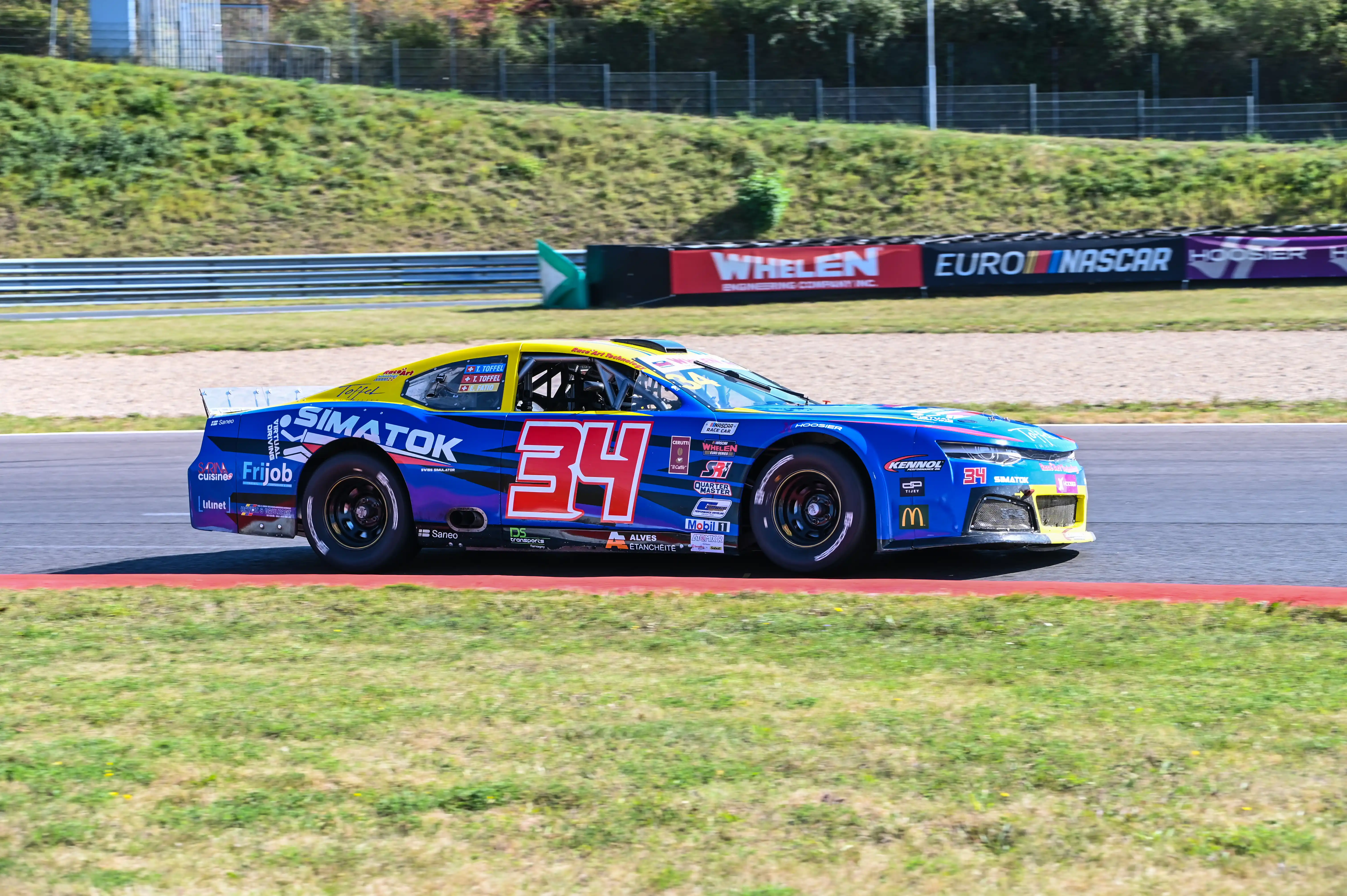
Thomas Toffel Racing in Most 2024

In 2024, Toffel competed in both the EuroNASCAR PRO and EuroNASCAR 2 divisions at Circuit Ricardo Tormo. He contended for top positions in EuroNASCAR 2 and won the Challenger Trophy in both EuroNASCAR PRO races. He assisted his team in securing victory in the first round of the Team Endurance Championship, with a total race time of 1:58:09.994 hours across four races, earning 40 points.

== Achievements ==
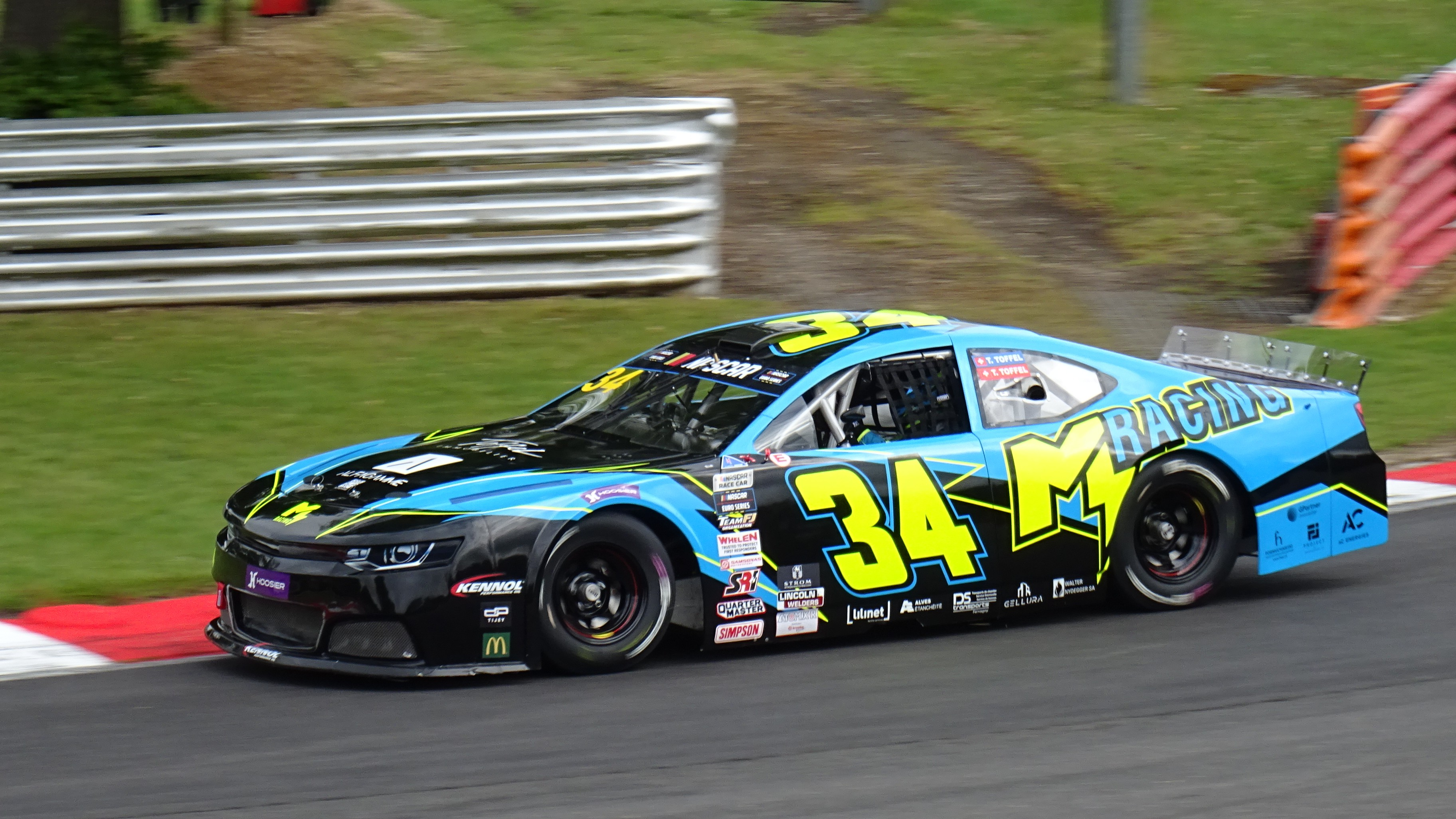
Toffel at Brands Hatch in 2025

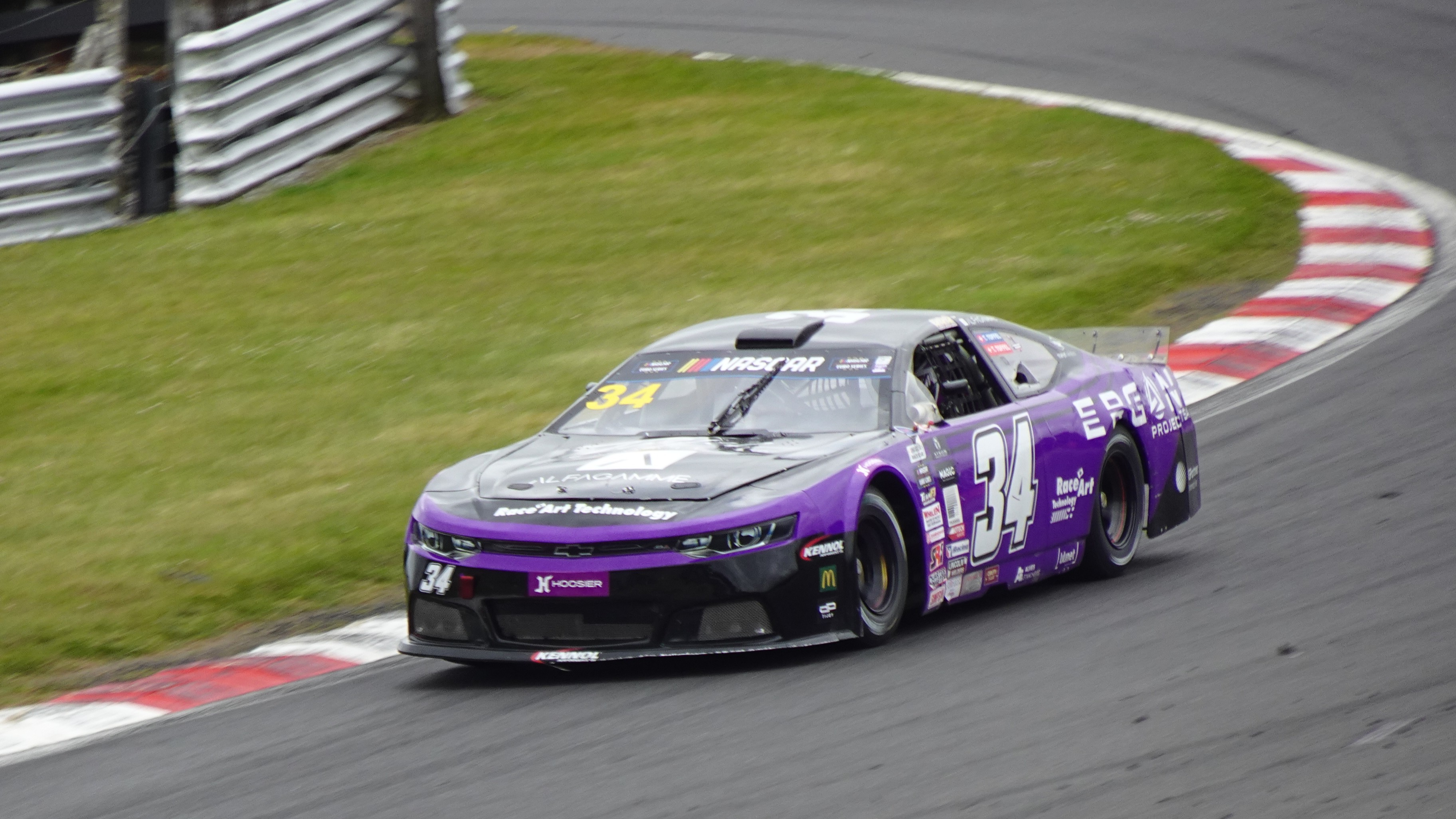
Toffel racing at Brands Hatch in 2026

- 2007: Partial participation in the Swiss Pocketbike Championship
- 2008: 6th overall in the Swiss Pocketbike Championship
- 2009:
  - Swiss Pocketbike Championship title
  - Participation in the European Pocketbike Championship
- 2010: Swiss Pocketbike Vice-Champion
- 2011: Partial participation in the Swiss Pocketbike Championship
- 2013: Competed in the Mitjet Series France Automobile Championship
- 2015:
  - Partial participation in the Swiss 1000cc Motorcycle Championship
  - European Superstock 1000 Motorcycle Championship, hindered by injuries
- 2016: Partial participation in the European Superstock 1000 Motorcycle Championship due to injuries
- 2021: Partial participation in the Swiss and Italian Legendcar Automobile Championships
- 2022:
  - Partial participation in the Italian Legendcar Championship
  - One race in the Euronascar Championship
- 2023: Competed in the Euronascar Championship in EN2 and Pro categories
- 2024: Competed in the Euronascar Championship in EN2 and Pro categories, finishing 4th overall in the EN2 category

== Career statistics ==
=== Superstock 1000 Cup ===
==== Races by year ====
(key) (Races in bold indicate pole position) (Races in italics indicate fastest lap)

Year	Bike	1	2	3	4	5	6	7	8	Pos	Pts
2015	BMW	ARA	NED	IMO	DON	ALG	MIS	JER	MAG; Ret	NC	0
2016	BMW	ARA; 27	NED; DNQ	IMO; DNQ	DON; DNQ	MIS	LAU	MAG	JER	NC	0
