= 2024 Focused Health 250 (COTA) =

Stock car race in Austin, Texas

Race details
- Race 5 of 33 of the 2024 NASCAR Xfinity Series
- Date: March 23, 2024
- Official name: 4th Annual Focused Health 250
- Location: Circuit of the Americas in Austin, Texas
- Course: Permanent racing facility
- Course length: 3.426 miles (5.514 km)
- Distance: 50 laps, 170 mi (273 km)
- Scheduled distance: 46 laps, 157 mi (253 km)
- Average speed: 72.374 mph (116.475 km/h)

Pole position
Driver	Kyle Larson	Hendrick Motorsports
- Time: 2:12.076

Most laps led
Driver	A. J. Allmendinger; Shane van Gisbergen	Kaulig Racing
- Laps: 20

Winner
No. 17	Kyle Larson	Hendrick Motorsports

Television in the United States
- Network: FS1
- Announcers: Adam Alexander, Joey Logano, and Daniel Suárez

Radio in the United States
- Radio: PRN

The 2024 Focused Health 250 was the 5th stock car race of the 2024 NASCAR Xfinity Series, and the 4th iteration of the event. The race was held on Saturday, March 23, 2024, at Circuit of the Americas in Austin, Texas, a 3.426 miles (5.514 km) permanent asphalt road course. The race was originally scheduled to be contested over 46 laps, but was increased to 50 laps due to a NASCAR overtime finish. In a thrilling race that featured a wild finish, Kyle Larson, driving for Hendrick Motorsports, would benefit from newer tires and steal the win after Shane van Gisbergen made contact with Austin Hill on the final lap. Van Gisbergen bumped into the back of Hill in turn 16, forcing both drivers up the racetrack and allowing Larson to sneak past both of them. This was Larson's 15th career NASCAR Xfinity Series win, and his first of the season. Van Gisbergen and teammate A. J. Allmendinger were the most consistent drivers of the race, both leading a race-high 20 laps. To fill out the podium, Hill, driving for Richard Childress Racing, and John Hunter Nemechek, driving for Joe Gibbs Racing, would finish 2nd and 3rd, respectively. Van Gisbergen, who originally finished in 2nd, was given a 30-second time penalty on the final lap for cutting the course. He was officially credited with a 27th place finish.

== Report ==
=== Background ===
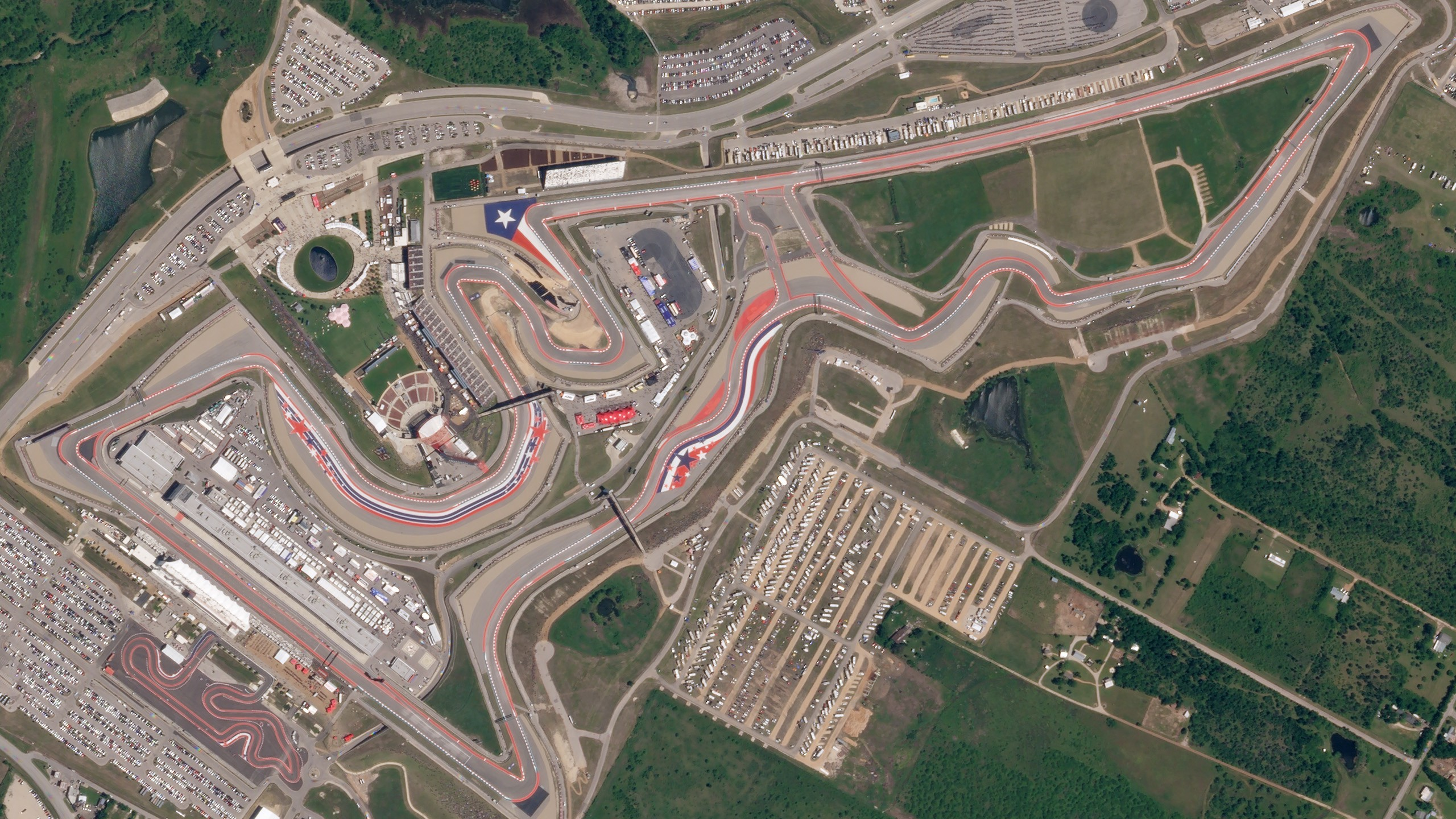
Aerial view of Circuit of the Americas, the circuit where the race will be held.

Circuit of the Americas (COTA) is a grade 1 FIA-specification motorsports facility located within the extraterritorial jurisdiction of Austin, Texas. It features a 3.426-mile (5.514 km) road racing circuit. The facility is home to the Formula One United States Grand Prix, and the Motorcycle Grand Prix of the Americas, a round of the FIM Road Racing World Championship. It previously hosted the Supercars Championship, the FIA World Endurance Championship, the IMSA SportsCar Championship, and IndyCar Series.

==== Entry list ====
- (R) denotes rookie driver.
- (i) denotes driver who is ineligible for series driver points.

#	Driver	Team	Make
00	Cole Custer	Stewart–Haas Racing	Ford
1	Sam Mayer	JR Motorsports	Chevrolet
2	Jesse Love (R)	Richard Childress Racing	Chevrolet
4	Patrick Gallagher	JD Motorsports	Chevrolet
5	Anthony Alfredo	Our Motorsports	Chevrolet
6	Ty Dillon (i)	JD Motorsports	Chevrolet
07	Daniil Kvyat	SS-Green Light Racing	Chevrolet
7	Justin Allgaier	JR Motorsports	Chevrolet
8	Sammy Smith	JR Motorsports	Chevrolet
9	Brandon Jones	JR Motorsports	Chevrolet
11	Josh Williams (Note: Due to baby watch, Daniel Hemric will practice and qualify Williams' No. 11 car. Williams is expected to make the race.)	Kaulig Racing	Chevrolet
14	R. C. Enerson	SS-Green Light Racing	Chevrolet
15	Hailie Deegan (R)	AM Racing	Ford
16	A. J. Allmendinger	Kaulig Racing	Chevrolet
17	Kyle Larson (i)	Hendrick Motorsports	Chevrolet
18	Sheldon Creed	Joe Gibbs Racing	Toyota
19	Ty Gibbs (i)	Joe Gibbs Racing	Toyota
20	John Hunter Nemechek (i)	Joe Gibbs Racing	Toyota
21	Austin Hill	Richard Childress Racing	Chevrolet
24	Ed Jones	Sam Hunt Racing	Toyota
26	Sage Karam	Sam Hunt Racing	Toyota
27	Jeb Burton	Jordan Anderson Racing	Chevrolet
28	Kaz Grala (i)	RSS Racing	Ford
29	Blaine Perkins	RSS Racing	Ford
31	Parker Retzlaff	Jordan Anderson Racing	Chevrolet
32	Austin Green	Jordan Anderson Racing	Chevrolet
35	Alex Labbé	Joey Gase Motorsports	Toyota
39	Ryan Sieg	RSS Racing	Ford
42	Leland Honeyman (R)	Young's Motorsports	Chevrolet
43	Ryan Ellis	Alpha Prime Racing	Chevrolet
44	Brennan Poole	Alpha Prime Racing	Chevrolet
45	Brad Perez	Alpha Prime Racing	Chevrolet
48	Parker Kligerman	Big Machine Racing	Chevrolet
50	Preston Pardus	Pardus Racing	Chevrolet
51	Jeremy Clements	Jeremy Clements Racing	Chevrolet
81	Chandler Smith	Joe Gibbs Racing	Toyota
91	Kyle Weatherman	DGM Racing	Chevrolet
92	Josh Bilicki	DGM Racing	Chevrolet
97	Shane van Gisbergen (R)	Kaulig Racing	Chevrolet
98	Riley Herbst	Stewart–Haas Racing	Ford
Official entry list

== Practice ==
The first and only practice session was held on Friday, March 22, at 4:30 PM CST, and would last for 20 minutes. Shane van Gisbergen, driving for Kaulig Racing, would set the fastest time in the session, with a lap of 2:14.728, and a speed of 91.117 mph (146.639 km/h).

Pos.	#	Driver	Team	Make	Time	Speed
1	97	Shane van Gisbergen (R)	Kaulig Racing	Chevrolet	2:14.728	91.117
2	16	A. J. Allmendinger	Kaulig Racing	Chevrolet	2:15.087	90.875
3	17	Kyle Larson (i)	Hendrick Motorsports	Chevrolet	2:15.394	90.669
Full practice results

== Qualifying ==
Qualifying was held on Friday, March 22, at 5:00 PM CST. Since Circuit of the Americas is a road course, the qualifying system is a two group system, with two rounds. Drivers will be separated into two groups, Group A and Group B. Each driver will have multiple laps to set a time. The fastest 5 drivers from each group will advance to the final round. The fastest driver to set a time in that round will win the pole.

Under a 2021 rule change, the timing line in road course qualifying is "not" the start-finish line. Instead, the timing line for qualifying will be set at the exit of Istanbul 8. Kyle Larson, driving for Hendrick Motorsports, would win the pole after advancing from the preliminary round and setting the fastest time in Round 2, with a track record lap of 2:12.076, and a speed of 92.946 mph (149.582 km/h).

Two drivers would fail to qualify: Kaz Grala and Preston Pardus.

=== Qualifying results ===
Pos.	#	Driver	Team	Make	Time (R1)	Speed (R1)	Time (R2)	Speed (R2)
1	17	Kyle Larson (i)	Hendrick Motorsports	Chevrolet	2:12.374	92.737	2:12.076	92.946
2	97	Shane van Gisbergen (R)	Kaulig Racing	Chevrolet	2:12.754	92.472	2:12.499	92.650
3	19	Ty Gibbs (i)	Joe Gibbs Racing	Toyota	2:12.669	92.531	2:12.660	92.537
4	81	Chandler Smith	Joe Gibbs Racing	Toyota	2:13.323	92.077	2:13.130	92.211
5	16	A. J. Allmendinger	Kaulig Racing	Chevrolet	2:13.094	92.236	2:13.162	92.188
6	26	Sage Karam	Sam Hunt Racing	Toyota	2:13.067	92.254	2:13.279	92.108
7	18	Sheldon Creed	Joe Gibbs Racing	Toyota	2:13.773	91.767	2:13.412	92.016
8	00	Cole Custer	Stewart–Haas Racing	Ford	2:13.477	91.971	2:13.486	91.965
9	11	Daniel Hemric (i)	Kaulig Racing	Chevrolet	2:13.240	92.134	2:13.523	91.939
10	1	Sam Mayer	JR Motorsports	Chevrolet	2:12.473	92.668	2:13.554	91.918
Eliminated in Round 1
11	21	Austin Hill	Richard Childress Racing	Chevrolet	2:13.585	91.897	—	—
12	48	Parker Kligerman	Big Machine Racing	Chevrolet	2:13.754	91.780	—	—
13	8	Sammy Smith	JR Motorsports	Chevrolet	2:13.789	91.756	—	—
14	2	Jesse Love (R)	Richard Childress Racing	Chevrolet	2:13.801	91.748	—	—
15	7	Justin Allgaier	JR Motorsports	Chevrolet	2:14.067	91.566	—	—
16	24	Ed Jones	Sam Hunt Racing	Toyota	2:14.534	91.248	—	—
17	31	Parker Retzlaff	Jordan Anderson Racing	Chevrolet	2:14.541	91.244	—	—
18	9	Brandon Jones	JR Motorsports	Chevrolet	2:14.577	91.219	—	—
19	98	Riley Herbst	Stewart–Haas Racing	Ford	2:14.690	91.143	—	—
20	20	John Hunter Nemechek (i)	Joe Gibbs Racing	Toyota	2:14.767	91.091	—	—
21	27	Jeb Burton	Jordan Anderson Racing	Chevrolet	2:15.589	90.538	—	—
22	07	Daniil Kvyat	SS-Green Light Racing	Chevrolet	2:15.596	90.534	—	—
23	92	Josh Bilicki	DGM Racing	Chevrolet	2:15.644	90.502	—	—
24	51	Jeremy Clements	Jeremy Clements Racing	Chevrolet	2:15.661	90.490	—	—
25	32	Austin Green	Jordan Anderson Racing	Chevrolet	2:15.804	90.395	—	—
26	35	Alex Labbé	Joey Gase Motorsports	Toyota	2:15.862	90.356	—	—
27	39	Ryan Sieg	RSS Racing	Ford	2:15.907	90.326	—	—
28	6	Ty Dillon (i)	JD Motorsports	Chevrolet	2:16.150	90.165	—	—
29	44	Brennan Poole	Alpha Prime Racing	Chevrolet	2:16.155	90.162	—	—
30	5	Anthony Alfredo	Our Motorsports	Chevrolet	2:16.197	90.134	—	—
31	45	Brad Perez	Alpha Prime Racing	Chevrolet	2:16.241	90.105	—	—
32	91	Kyle Weatherman	DGM Racing	Chevrolet	2:16.274	90.083	—	—
33	4	Patrick Gallagher	JD Motorsports	Chevrolet	2:16.417	89.989	—	—
Qualified by owner's points
34	42	Leland Honeyman (R)	Young's Motorsports	Chevrolet	2:16.522	89.920	—	—
35	15	Hailie Deegan (R)	AM Racing	Ford	2:16.590	89.875	—	—
36	29	Blaine Perkins	RSS Racing	Ford	2:16.742	89.775	—	—
37	14	R. C. Enerson	SS-Green Light Racing	Chevrolet	2:17.158	89.503	—	—
38	43	Ryan Ellis	Alpha Prime Racing	Chevrolet	2:17.356	89.374	—	—
Failed to qualify
39	28	Kaz Grala (i)	RSS Racing	Ford	2:16.445	89.970	—	—
40	50	Preston Pardus	Pardus Racing	Chevrolet	2:38.472	77.465	—	—
Official qualifying results
Official starting lineup

== Race results ==
Stage 1 Laps: 14

Pos.	#	Driver	Team	Make	Pts
1	48	Parker Kligerman	Big Machine Racing	Chevrolet	10
2	8	Sammy Smith	JR Motorsports	Chevrolet	9
3	26	Sage Karam	Sam Hunt Racing	Toyota	8
4	31	Parker Retzlaff	Jordan Anderson Racing	Chevrolet	7
5	98	Riley Herbst	Stewart–Haas Racing	Ford	6
6	21	Austin Hill	Richard Childress Racing	Chevrolet	5
7	35	Alex Labbé	Joey Gase Motorsports	Toyota	4
8	16	A. J. Allmendinger	Kaulig Racing	Chevrolet	3
9	92	Josh Bilicki	DGM Racing	Chevrolet	2
10	97	Shane van Gisbergen (R)	Kaulig Racing	Chevrolet	1

Stage 2 Laps: 16

Pos.	#	Driver	Team	Make	Pts
1	98	Riley Herbst	Stewart–Haas Racing	Ford	10
2	00	Cole Custer	Stewart–Haas Racing	Ford	9
3	16	A. J. Allmendinger	Kaulig Racing	Chevrolet	8
4	17	Kyle Larson (i)	Hendrick Motorsports	Chevrolet	0
5	97	Shane van Gisbergen (R)	Kaulig Racing	Chevrolet	6
6	35	Alex Labbé	Joey Gase Motorsports	Toyota	5
7	39	Ryan Sieg	RSS Racing	Ford	4
8	92	Josh Bilicki	DGM Racing	Chevrolet	3
9	19	Ty Gibbs (i)	Joe Gibbs Racing	Toyota	0
10	81	Chandler Smith	Joe Gibbs Racing	Toyota	1

Stage 3 Laps: 20

Fin	St	#	Driver	Team	Make	Laps	Led	Status	Pts
1	1	17	Kyle Larson (i)	Hendrick Motorsports	Chevrolet	50	1	Running	0
2	11	21	Austin Hill	Richard Childress Racing	Chevrolet	50	1	Running	40
3	20	20	John Hunter Nemechek (i)	Joe Gibbs Racing	Toyota	50	0	Running	0
4	8	00	Cole Custer	Stewart–Haas Racing	Ford	50	0	Running	42
5	12	48	Parker Kligerman	Big Machine Racing	Chevrolet	50	4	Running	42
6	14	2	Jesse Love (R)	Richard Childress Racing	Chevrolet	50	0	Running	31
7	25	32	Austin Green	Jordan Anderson Racing	Chevrolet	50	0	Running	30
8	4	81	Chandler Smith	Joe Gibbs Racing	Toyota	50	0	Running	30
9	10	1	Sam Mayer	JR Motorsports	Chevrolet	50	0	Running	28
10	5	16	A. J. Allmendinger	Kaulig Racing	Chevrolet	50	20	Running	38
11	17	31	Parker Retzlaff	Jordan Anderson Racing	Chevrolet	50	0	Running	33
12	30	5	Anthony Alfredo	Our Motorsports	Chevrolet	50	0	Running	25
13	15	7	Justin Allgaier	JR Motorsports	Chevrolet	50	0	Running	24
14	27	39	Ryan Sieg	RSS Racing	Ford	50	0	Running	27
15	29	44	Brennan Poole	Alpha Prime Racing	Chevrolet	50	0	Running	22
16	18	9	Brandon Jones	JR Motorsports	Chevrolet	50	1	Running	21
17	6	26	Sage Karam	Sam Hunt Racing	Toyota	50	0	Running	28
18	31	45	Brad Perez	Alpha Prime Racing	Chevrolet	50	0	Running	19
19	24	51	Jeremy Clements	Jeremy Clements Racing	Chevrolet	50	0	Running	18
20	34	42	Leland Honeyman (R)	Young's Motorsports	Chevrolet	50	0	Running	17
21	22	07	Daniil Kvyat	SS-Green Light Racing	Chevrolet	50	0	Running	16
22	36	29	Blaine Perkins	RSS Racing	Ford	50	0	Running	15
23	35	15	Hailie Deegan (R)	AM Racing	Ford	50	0	Running	14
24	3	19	Ty Gibbs (i)	Joe Gibbs Racing	Toyota	50	1	Running	0
25	33	4	Patrick Gallagher	JD Motorsports	Chevrolet	50	0	Running	12
26	26	35	Alex Labbé	Joey Gase Motorsports	Toyota	50	0	Running	20
27	2	97	Shane van Gisbergen (R)	Kaulig Racing	Chevrolet	50	20	Running	17
28	37	14	R. C. Enerson	SS-Green Light Racing	Chevrolet	50	0	Running	9
29	32	91	Kyle Weatherman	DGM Racing	Chevrolet	50	0	Running	8
30	21	27	Jeb Burton	Jordan Anderson Racing	Chevrolet	49	0	Running	7
31	23	92	Josh Bilicki	DGM Racing	Chevrolet	48	0	Suspension	11
32	7	18	Sheldon Creed	Joe Gibbs Racing	Toyota	47	0	Running	5
33	38	43	Ryan Ellis	Alpha Prime Racing	Chevrolet	45	0	Accident	4
34	19	98	Riley Herbst	Stewart–Haas Racing	Ford	45	2	Accident	19
35	16	24	Ed Jones	Sam Hunt Racing	Toyota	42	0	Accident	2
36	13	8	Sammy Smith	JR Motorsports	Chevrolet	36	0	Accident	10
37	28	6	Ty Dillon (i)	JD Motorsports	Chevrolet	33	0	Suspension	0
38	9	11	Josh Williams	Kaulig Racing	Chevrolet	24	0	Overheating	1
Official race results

== Standings after the race ==
Drivers' Championship standings

	Pos	Driver	Points
1	1	Austin Hill	222
1	2	Chandler Smith	213 (-9)
	3	Cole Custer	192 (–30)
1	4	Jesse Love	166 (–56)
1	5	Riley Herbst	165 (–57)
1	6	A. J. Allmendinger	162 (–60)
4	7	Parker Kligerman	147 (–75)
	8	Justin Allgaier	143 (–79)
	9	Brandon Jones	139 (–83)
4	10	Sheldon Creed	135 (–87)
1	11	Sammy Smith	124 (–98)
	12	Anthony Alfredo	123 (–99)
Official driver's standings

Manufacturers' Championship standings

Pos	Manufacturer	Points
1	Chevrolet	188
2	Toyota	174 (–14)
3	Ford	153 (–35)

- Note: Only the first 12 positions are included for the driver standings.

Previous race: 2024 Call811.com Every Dig. Every Time. 200	NASCAR Xfinity Series; 2024 season	Next race: 2024 ToyotaCare 250
