= Spec Miata =

Type of racing car

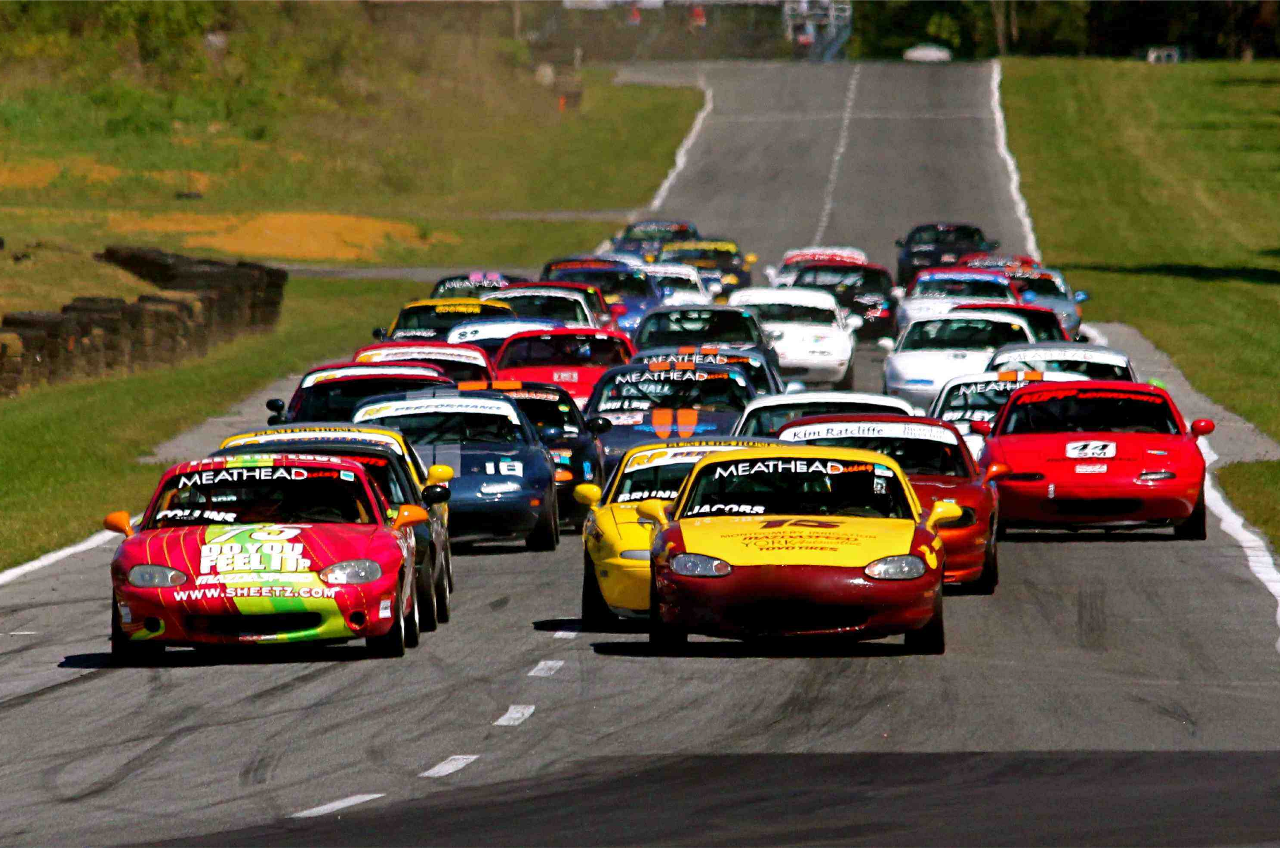
Spec Miata start

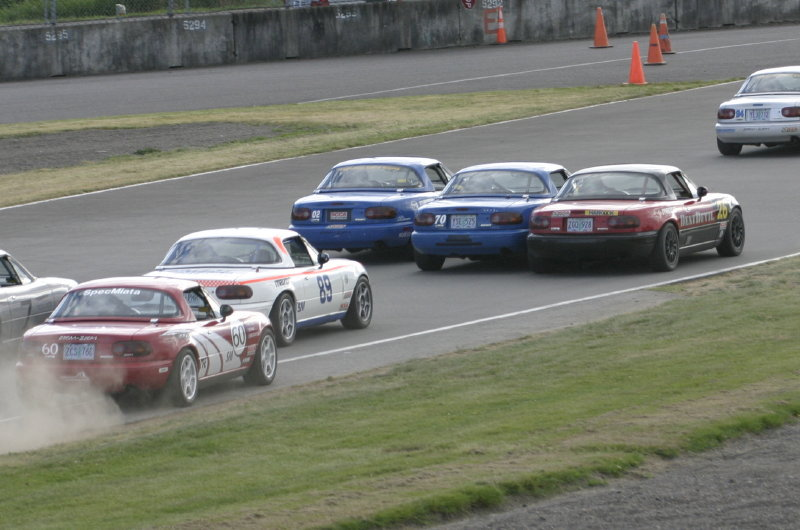
Spec Miata cars on track

Spec Miata is a class of racing car used in Sports Car Club of America (SCCA), National Auto Sport Association (NASA), Midwestern Council of Sports Car Clubs (MCSCC) road racing, and other club events.

The Spec Miata (SM) class is intended to provide the opportunity to compete in low-cost cars with limited modifications, suitable for racing competition. It is intended to encourage low cost, entry level, production car based competition. Spec Miata currently races both sprints and enduros where available.

Mazda MX-5s (also known as Mazda Miata Roadsters) in model years 1990 through 1993 with 1600 cc engines, model years 1994 through 1997 with 1800 cc engines, and model years 1999 through 2005 with 1800 cc engines have been approved by the SCCA for regional racing in all divisions of the SCCA. The class was approved for national SCCA racing beginning in the 2006 racing season.

Spec Miata was first approved as a regional class in the Southwest Division of SCCA in 1999 and the first race as an official class was at the Fiesta Carrera Regional, Texas World Speedway 2.90 road course on July 24, 1999, at 1:05 pm and included a starting field of four drivers: Tim Evans, Shannon McMasters, Bob Reinhardt and David Obeney finishing in that order.

The first Spec Miata race for the National Auto Sport Association was held in February 2000 by the NorCal Region. At the national level, the "UPR Racing Supply First Ever Spec Miata National" was held in Avondale, Arizona, at Phoenix International Raceway's infield road course on January 13, 2006 with Brad Rampelberg as the "First Ever" national race winner.

As its name shows, Spec Miata is a "specified" class. This means that the rules for allowable modifications to the car are very strict. The class intends to put drivers on a very even footing by making their cars as identical as possible. The rules are far more conservative than the Improved Touring category, but provide equivalent safety measures.

Because of the support of Mazda, the wide availability of the car on the used market, plentiful and inexpensive parts, and the simplicity of maintenance on the cars, Spec Miata has become a very popular class. Also adding to the appeal is the fact that a Spec Miata can be raced in both SM and ITA/ITS in SCCA regional competition. A typical race-ready Spec Miata can be purchased on the market for anywhere between $6000 and $65,000 depending on race win history and specific modifications.

Spec Racing continues in Later Models of the NC and ND chassis Miatas, though they are not intended to serve as a replacement to the NA-NB based "Spec Miata". A new MX-5 Cup (professional class) based on the ND series MX-5 costs $80,000 turnkey, and champions of the national series can win over $200,000 to advance up the motorsport ladder.

In August 2019, Mazda Motorsports and Winding Road Racing announced Spec MX-5 or "SMX", a racing class structure based around the MX-5 NC that is designed to be an affordable, tech-able, reliable and fun-to-drive option for club racers. Race cars in the division will feature Roush Performance cylinder heads, Penske Racing shocks, Eibach springs and sway bars, Pagid brake pads, Toyo tires, and more, and will have a curb weight of 2,500 lb (1,100 kg). Spec MX-5 will have select events starting in 2020.

== Class rules ==
This section is not an exhaustive set of rules; it is intended to give an idea of the preparation level of the cars in this class.

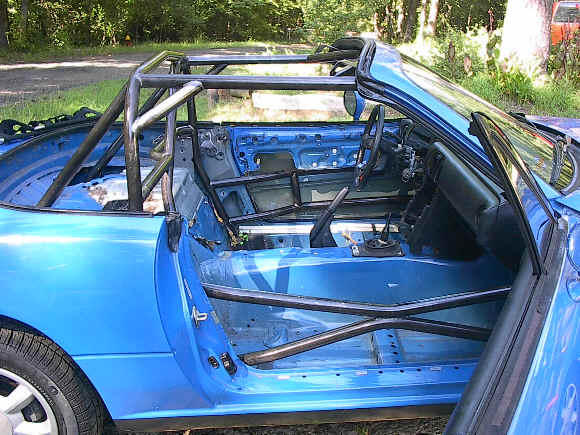
An example of Spec Miata safety roll cage by Racefab Inc.

Spec Miatas used a specific Bilstein shock with an adjustable coil-over suspension with Eibach springs and adjustable front and rear sway bars. Beginning in 2019 the Bilstein was replaced with a Penske shock. Springs remain the same, but the shocks, top mounts and integrated adjusters/perches are different from the original Bilstein setup.

Depending on the club, Toyo or Hoosier tires are specified. For SCCA SM, the Hoosier SM7.5 is the dry tire and SMW (SM Wet) is the wet tire. For NASA, the Toyo RR is the dry tire and RA-1 is the wet tire. (205/50R15) is the spec tire size. Hoosier Tires will provide the spec tire for all National SCCA Events. The wheel size is fixed at 15 × 7, with the wheels weighing no less than 13 pounds.

Cars with 1.6 liter engines (1990-1993) have a race weight of 2275 pounds (1057 kg) and first generation cars with a 1.8 liter displacement engine (1994-1997) have a minimum race weight of 2400 pounds. "NB1 Miatas" (1999-2000) have a minimum weight of 2400 pounds. "NB2 Miatas (2001-2005) have a minimum weight of 2450. Overbore engines are a 15 lb addition.

The 1.8 liter displacement cars may not run an aftermarket air intake and NB models must run a throttle restrictor, while the 1.6 liter displacement cars do not require a restrictor, they may run a modified air box, and may remove the driver corner light. The class calls for "stock" engines with some modifications allowed in the name of balancing factory tolerances. Engine builders have been taking advantage of this for years, and "Top Prep" engines make 10-20 horsepower more than a healthy stock engine and cost several thousand dollars. The full SCCA rules for the class may be found in the current Spec Miata Category Specifications of the SCCA rule book, called the GCR (General Competition Rules & Specifications). * The current NASA SM Rules are downloadable at .

== SCCA national champions ==
- 2024 Ethan Goulart, Shelton, Connecticut
- 2023 Nick Bruni, Arlington, Virginia, and Preston Pardus, New Smyrna Beach, Florida
- 2022 Nick Bruni, Arlington, Virginia
- 2021 Preston Pardus, New Smyrna Beach, Florida
- 2020 Preston Pardus, New Smyrna Beach, Florida
- 2019 Todd Buras, Melbourne, Florida
- 2018 Mark Drennan, San Jose, California
- 2017 Preston Pardus, New Smyrna Beach, Florida
- 2016 Justin Hille, Ypsilanti, Michigan
- 2015 Johnathan Goring, Norfolk, Connecticut
- 2014 Erik Stearns, Van Buren, Ohio
- 2013 Jim Drago, Memphis, Tennessee
- 2012 Jim Drago, Memphis, Tennessee
- 2011 Elivan Goulart, Shelton, Connecticut
- 2010 Andrew Charbonneau, Delray Beach, Florida
- 2009 Steven Gorriaran, Providence, Rhode Island
- 2008 Eric Foss, Northeast Oklahoma Region
- 2007 Brad Rampelberg, San Francisco Region
- 2006 Andrew Caddell, Northwest Region

== NASA national champions ==
- 2025 Lincoln Larson
- 2024 Dan Williams
- 2023 Michael Carter
- 2022 Aaron Jeansonne
- 2021 Preston Pardus
- 2020 Race was not held.
- 2019 Jim Drago
- 2018 Danny Steyn
- 2017 Michael Ross (East)
- 2017 Tristan Littlehale (West)
- 2016 Tyler Kicera (East)
- 2016 Nick Sommers (West)
- 2015 Mark Drennan (East)
- 2015 Mark Drennan (West)
- 2014 Alex Bolanos
- 2013 Matt Schultz
- 2012 Yiannis Tsiounis
- 2011 Nathanial Sparks
- 2010 Dan Mackeever
- 2009 Andy Rushing
- 2008 Todd Lamb
- 2007 Todd Lamb
- 2006 Greg Stasiowski
