= Preston Pardus =

American racing driver (born 1997)

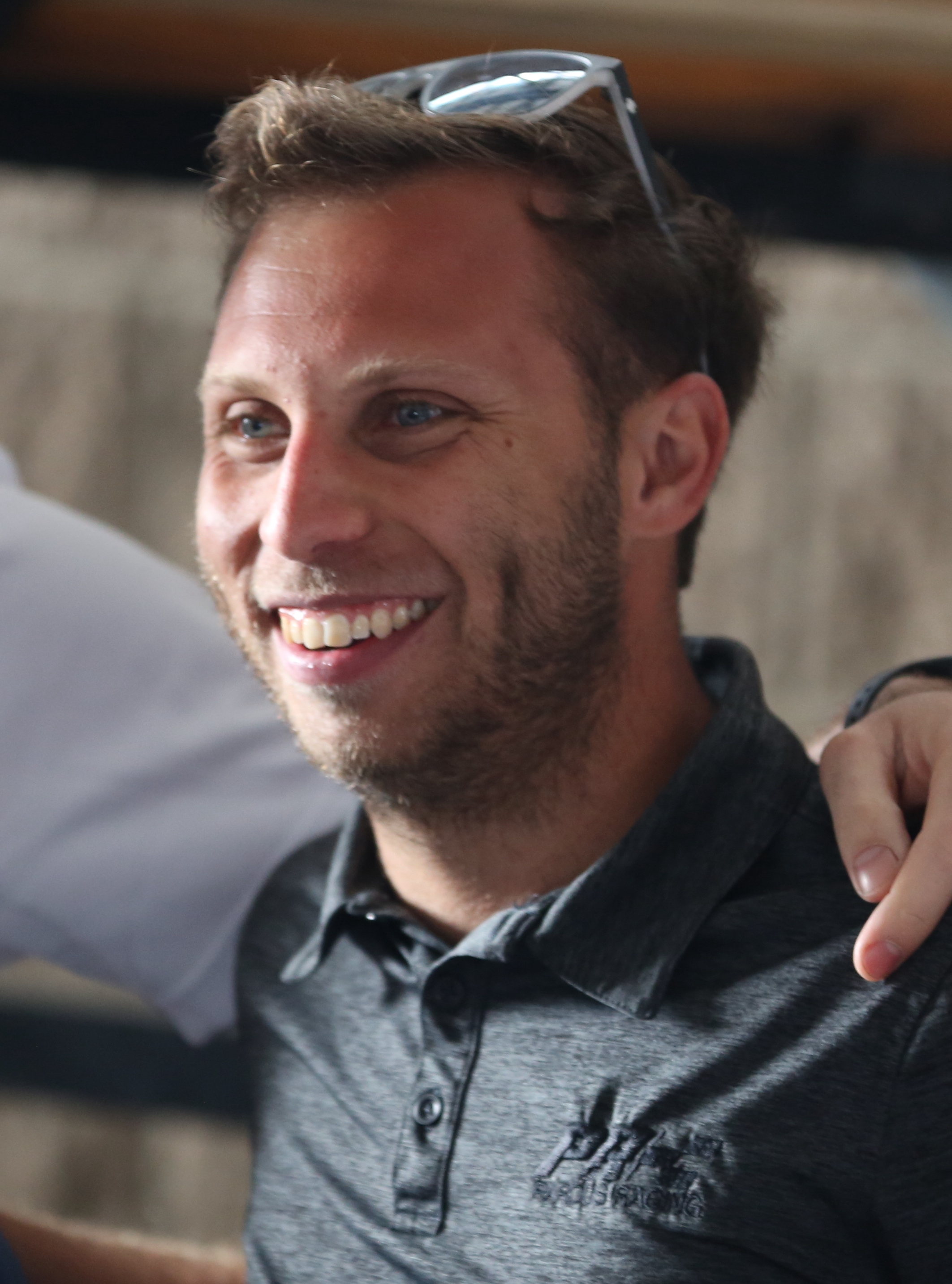
- Pardus at Sonoma Raceway in 2024
- Born: Preston Joseph Pardus; February 15, 1997 (age 29); New Smyrna Beach, Florida, U.S.
- Achievements: 2023 SCCA National Championship Runoffs champion (Spec Miata); 2021 SCCA National Championship Runoffs champion (Spec Miata); 2020 SCCA Super Sweep (Spec Miata); 2020 SCCA National Championship Runoffs champion (Spec Miata); 2017 SCCA National Championship Runoffs champion (Spec Miata)

NASCAR O'Reilly Auto Parts Series career
- 38 races run over 8 years
- Car no., team: No. 50 (Pardus Racing Inc.)
- 2026 position: 39th
- Best finish: 36th (2021)
- First race: 2019 CTECH Manufacturing 180 (Road America)
- Last race: 2026 O'Reilly Auto Parts 300 (Homestead)
| Wins | Top tens | Poles |
|---|---|---|
| 0 | 3 | 0 |
- Statistics up to date as of November 7, 2026.

Preston Joseph Pardus (born February 15, 1997) is an American professional racing driver. He competes part-time in the NASCAR O'Reilly Auto Parts Series, driving the No. 50 Chevrolet Camaro SS for Pardus Racing Inc. He also competes in the Sports Car Club of America. Pardus won the Spec Miata class at the 2017 SCCA National Championship Runoffs and claimed the 2020 Super Sweep in the Spec Miata division. He is the son of former NASCAR driver Dan Pardus.

== Racing career ==
Racing Spec Miatas, Pardus won the 2017 SCCA National Championship Runoffs on a last-lap pass. Pardus was also selected by Mazda Motorsports as a finalist to compete at the Mazda Road to 24 Shootout in late 2017. In 2019, Pardus started the Super Tour off with a win at Sebring International Raceway in January, competing in the Central Florida region of the SCCA. He went on to win the SCCA Majors Southeast Conference Championship that year, topping a series with over 150 entrants.

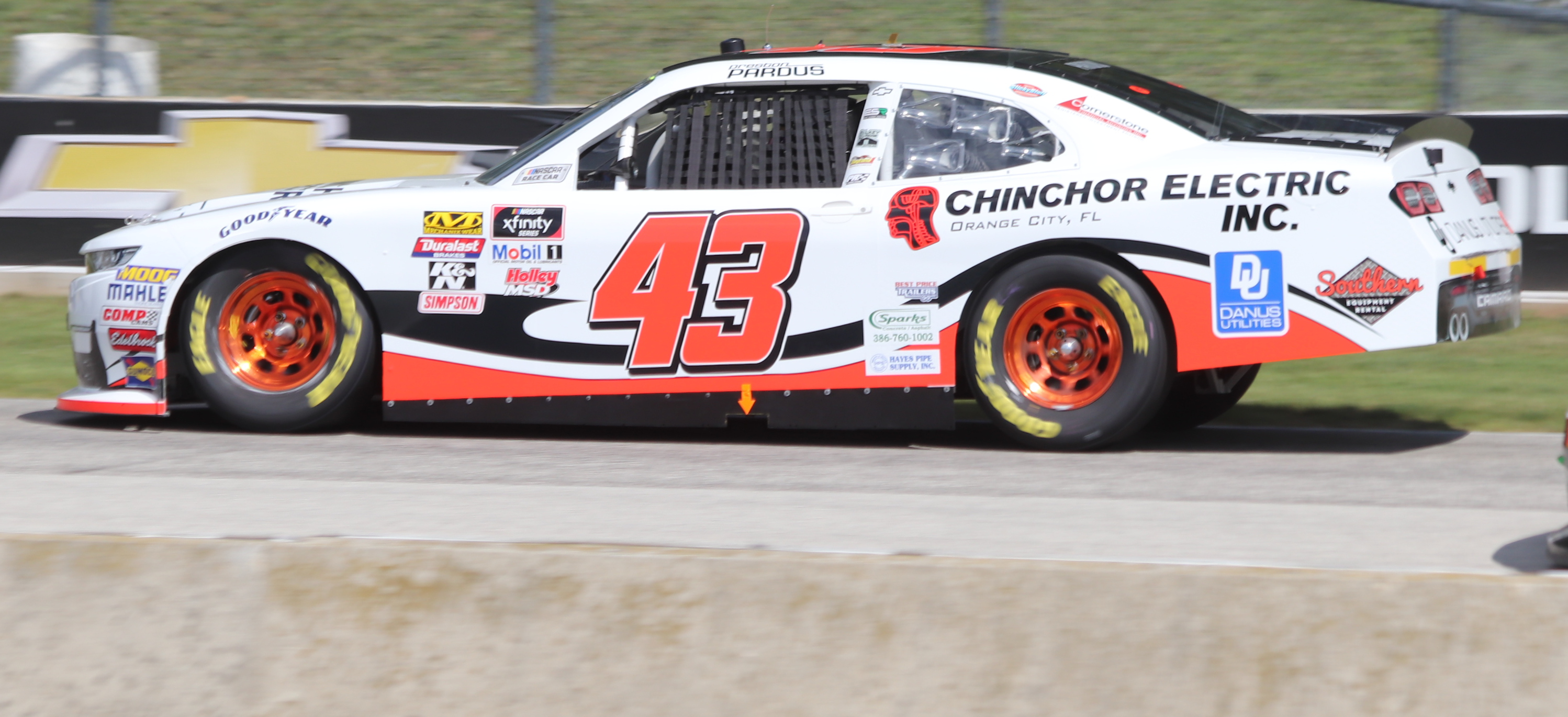
Pardus in his Xfinity Series debut in 2019 at Road America

In August 2019, Pardus made his NASCAR Xfinity Series debut in the 2019 CTECH Manufacturing 180 at Road America. While the start came with his family Pardus Racing Inc. team, Pardus' car was an old Chip Ganassi Racing chassis, was powered by an Earnhardt Childress Engines engine, and the at-track effort was headed by Tony Furr, who served as crew chief. He returned to the series in July 2020 for the Pennzoil 150 on the Indianapolis Motor Speedway road course, driving for DGM Racing. After starting nineteenth, Pardus ended the race in tenth for his first top-ten finish in NASCAR. At the SCCA Runoffs that year, Pardus avoided a first-lap melee and went from seventh to the lead on the final lap to claim his second Runoffs victory in the Spec Miata class. In doing so, he also garnered the 2020 Super Sweep award for the Spec Miata division, awarded to any driver who wins the Runoffs, point standings and a major conference championship in the same season.

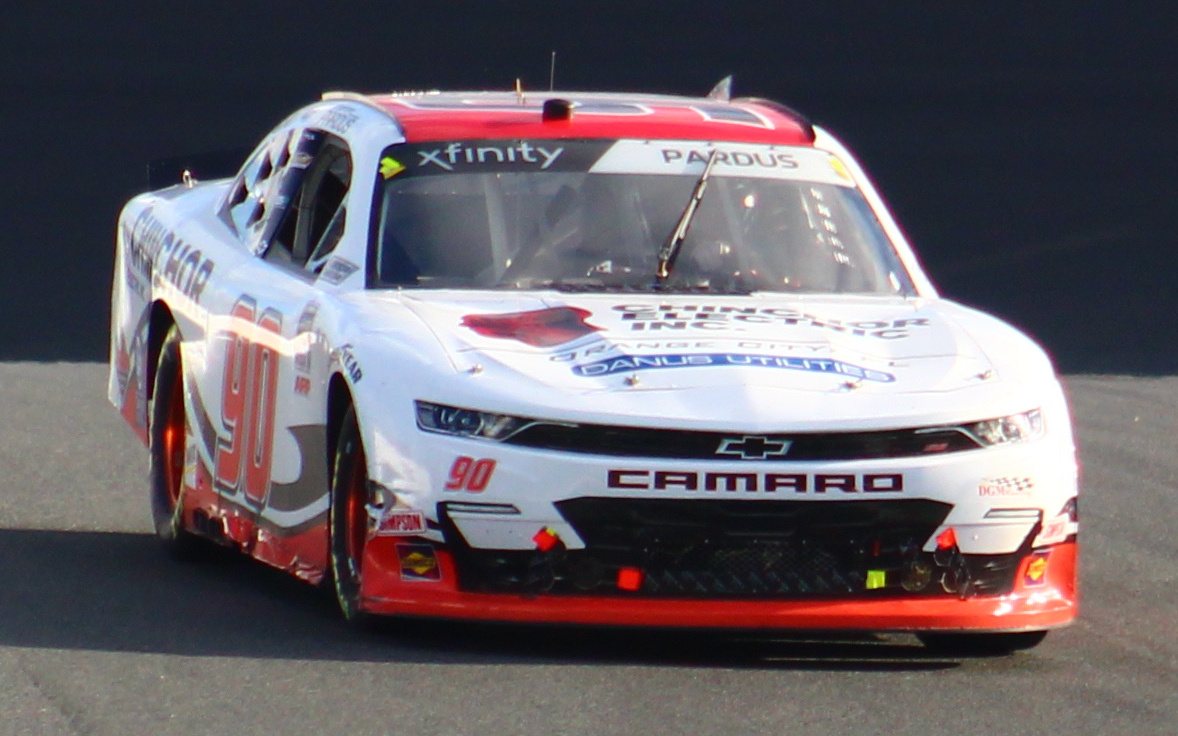
Pardus in the DGM Racing No. 90 car at the Charlotte Motor Speedway Roval in 2021

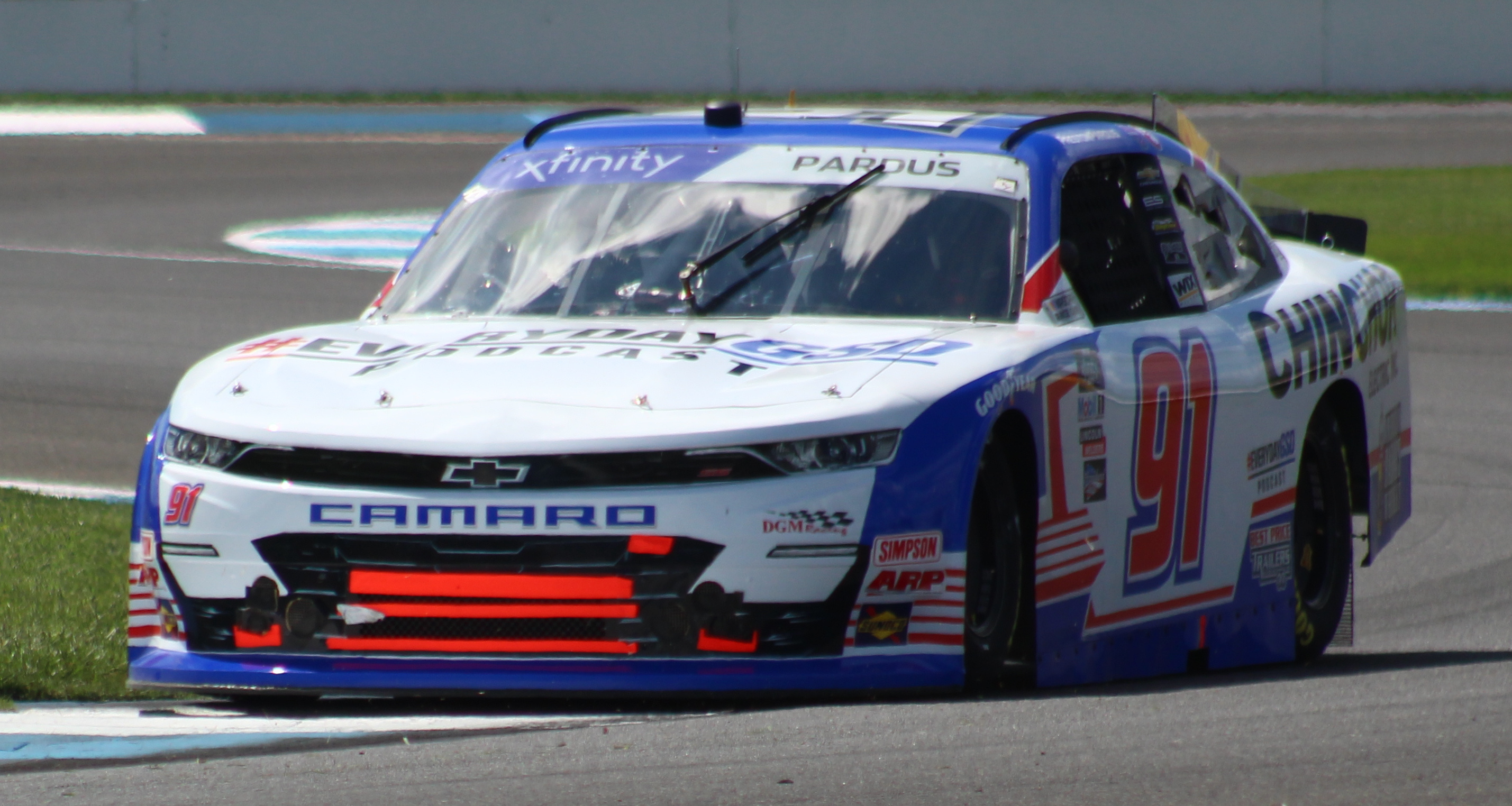
Pardus in the DGM Racing No. 91 car at the Indianapolis Motor Speedway Road Course in 2022

In 2021, Pardus returned to DGM for the second year in a row to run the road course races in the Xfinity Series. In his first race on his schedule, the Daytona Road Course, he was entered in the team's No. 91, a new part-time fourth car for them, but due to there being over forty cars on the entry list and the race not having qualifying, the No. 91 was excluded and missed the field as a result of being too low in owner points. DGM then moved Pardus to their full-time No. 90 car, which was to be driven by Caesar Bacarella that weekend until he was replaced by Pardus. He came back to the 91 at the Pit Boss 250. Pardus posted his best finish of 7th at the Charlotte Roval.

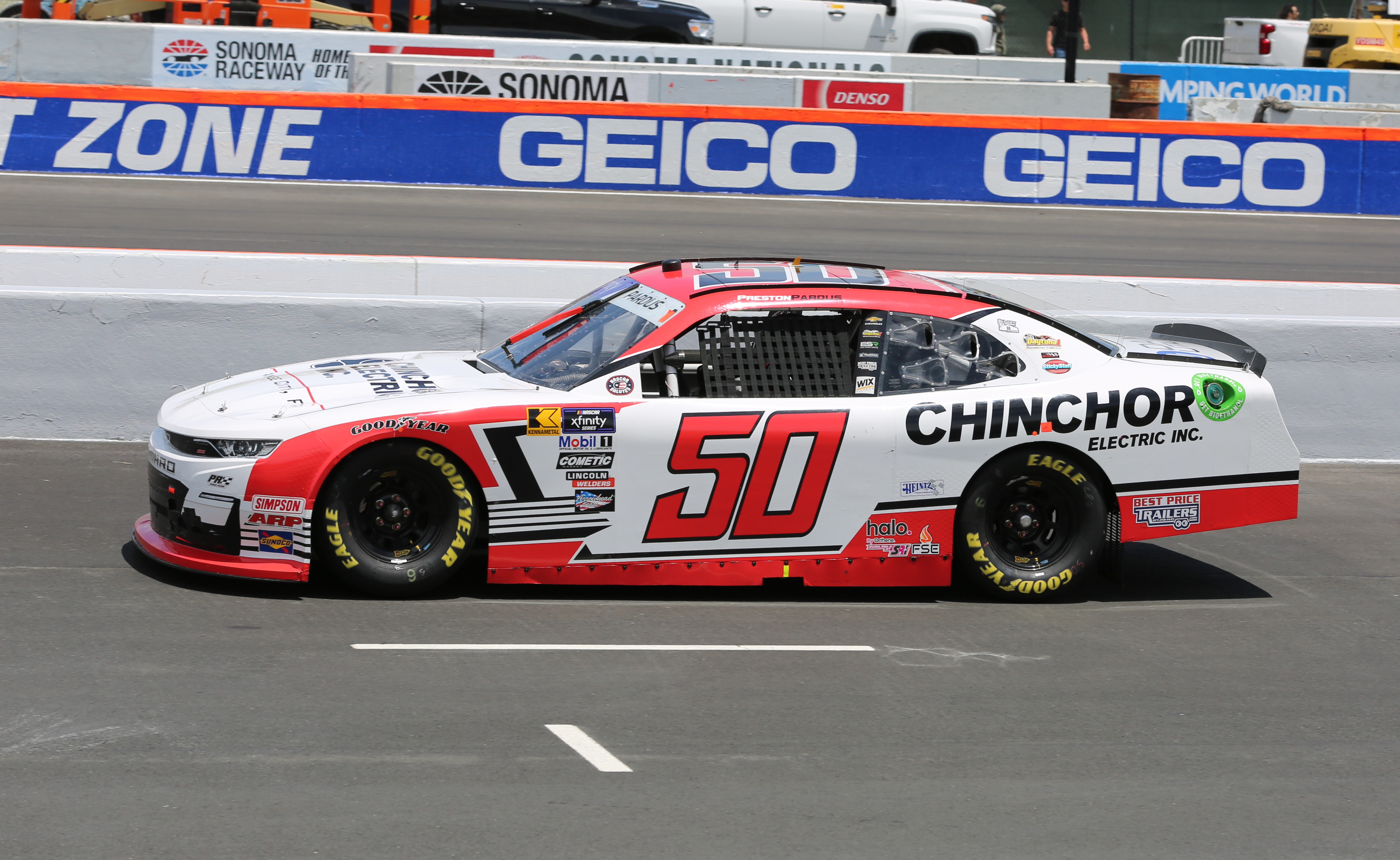
Pardus' No. 50 car at Sonoma Raceway in 2024

In 2023, Pardus returned to driving for his own team in the Xfinity Series, which he last did in 2019. However, "Inc." was no longer a part of the re-started Pardus family team's name and the No. 43, which the team used in 2019, was taken by Alpha Prime Racing starting in 2023, so the team switched to the No. 50, a number that Pardus' father Dan used in the Cup Series in 1999 driving for Midwest Transit Racing. The first Xfinity Series race Preston and his team would run in 2023 was Circuit of the Americas. He would race two more races for his own team, which were at the Chicago Street Course and the Indianapolis Motor Speedway Road Course. Also, he would race for SS-Green Light Racing in 2023.

== Personal life ==
Pardus' father Dan formerly competed in the NASCAR Winston Cup Series, NASCAR Busch Series and ARCA Re/Max Series. He graduated from Spruce Creek High School in 2015.

Pardus' family owns Danus Utilities, Inc., an underground utility company that he works for when he is not racing. Danus Utilities has also sponsored his race cars.

== Motorsports career results ==
=== SCCA National Championship Runoffs ===
| Year | Track | Car | Engine | Class | Finish | Start | Status |
|---|---|---|---|---|---|---|---|
| 2015 | Daytona | Mazda Miata | Mazda | Spec Miata | 19 | 5 | Running |
| 2017 | Indianapolis | Mazda Miata | Mazda | Spec Miata | 1 | 2 | Running |
| 2018 | Sonoma | Mazda Miata | Mazda | Spec Miata | 5 | 10 | Running |
| 2019 | VIR | Mazda Miata | Mazda | Spec Miata | 2 | 2 | Running |
| 2020 | Road America | Mazda Miata | Mazda | Spec Miata | 1 | 9 | Running |
| 2021 | Indianapolis | Mazda Miata | Mazda | Spec Miata | 1 | 2 | Running |
| 2022 | VIR | Mazda Miata | Mazda | Spec Miata | 8 | 2 | Running |
| 2023 | VIR | Mazda Miata | Mazda | Spec Miata | 1 | 2 | Running |
| 2024 | Road America | Mazda Miata | Mazda | Spec Miata | 3 | 5 | Running |

=== NASCAR ===
(key) (Bold – Pole position awarded by qualifying time. Italics – Pole position earned by points standings or practice time. * – Most laps led.)

==== O'Reilly Auto Parts Series ====
NASCAR O'Reilly Auto Parts Series results
| Year | Team | No. | Make | 1 | 2 | 3 | 4 | 5 | 6 | 7 | 8 | 9 | 10 | 11 | 12 | 13 | 14 | 15 | 16 | 17 | 18 | 19 | 20 | 21 | 22 | 23 | 24 | 25 | 26 | 27 | 28 | 29 | 30 | 31 | 32 | 33 | NOAPSC | Pts | Ref |
|---|---|---|---|---|---|---|---|---|---|---|---|---|---|---|---|---|---|---|---|---|---|---|---|---|---|---|---|---|---|---|---|---|---|---|---|---|---|---|---|
| 2019 | Pardus Racing Inc. | 43 | Chevy | DAY | ATL | LVS | PHO | CAL | TEX | BRI | RCH | TAL | DOV | CLT | POC | MCH | IOW | CHI | DAY | KEN | NHA | IOW | GLN | MOH | BRI | ROA; 36 | DAR | IND | LVS | RCH | ROV; 27 | DOV | KAN | TEX | PHO | HOM | 73rd | 11 | |
| 2020 | DGM Racing | 36 | Chevy | DAY | LVS | CAL | PHO | DAR | CLT | BRI | ATL | HOM | HOM | TAL | POC | IRC; 10 | KEN | KEN | TEX | KAN | ROA; 8 | DRC; 31 | DOV | DOV | DAY | DAR | RCH | RCH | BRI | LVS | TAL | | | | | | 44th | 74 | |
| 2020 | DGM Racing | 90 | Chevy | | | | | | | | | | | | | | | | | | | | | | | | | | | | | ROV; 32 | KAN | TEX | MAR | PHO | 44th | 74 | |
| 2021 | DGM Racing | 91 | Chevy | DAY | DRC; DNQ | | | | | | | | | COA; 14 | CLT | | | | | | | | | | | | | | | | | | | | | | 36th | 127 | |
| 2021 | DGM Racing | 90 | Chevy | | DRC; 33 | HOM | LVS | PHO | ATL | MAR | TAL | DAR | DOV | | | MOH; 25 | TEX | NSH | POC | ROA; 16 | ATL | NHA | GLN; 23 | IRC; 35 | MCH | DAY | DAR | RCH | BRI | LVS | TAL | ROV; 7 | TEX | KAN | MAR; 18 | PHO | 36th | 127 | |
| 2022 | DGM Racing | 91 | Chevy | DAY | CAL | LVS | PHO | ATL | COA; 14 | RCH | MAR | TAL | DOV | DAR | TEX | CLT | PIR | NSH | ROA; 11 | ATL | NHA | POC | IRC; 29 | MCH | GLN; 21 | DAY | DAR | KAN | BRI | TEX | TAL | ROV; 21 | LVS | HOM | MAR | PHO | 42nd | 100 | |
| 2023 | Pardus Racing | 50 | Chevy | DAY | CAL | LVS | PHO | ATL | COA; 36 | RCH | MAR | TAL | DOV | DAR | CLT | | | | CSC; 12 | ATL | NHA | POC | ROA | MCH | IRC; 24 | GLN | DAY | DAR | KAN | BRI | TEX | ROV; DNQ | LVS | HOM | MAR | PHO | 49th | 45 | |
| 2023 | SS-Green Light Racing | 08 | Ford | | | | | | | | | | | | | PIR; 31 | SON | NSH | | | | | | | | | | | | | | | | | | | 49th | 45 | |
| 2024 | Pardus Racing Inc. | 50 | Chevy | DAY | ATL | LVS | PHO | COA; DNQ | RCH | MAR | TEX | TAL | DOV | DAR | CLT | | SON; 25 | IOW | NHA | NSH | CSC; 32 | POC | IND | MCH | DAY | DAR | ATL | GLN | BRI | KAN | TAL | ROV; 21 | LVS | HOM | MAR; 24 | PHO | 51st | 47 | |
| 2024 | DGM Racing | 36 | Chevy | | | | | | | | | | | | | PIR; 38 | | | | | | | | | | | | | | | | | | | | | 51st | 47 | |
| 2025 | Pardus Racing Inc. | 50 | Chevy | DAY | ATL | COA; 36 | PHO | LVS | HOM | MAR | DAR | BRI | CAR | TAL | TEX | CLT | NSH | MXC | POC | ATL | CSC; 29 | SON | DOV | IND | IOW | | | | | | | ROV; 38 | LVS | TAL | MAR; DNQ | PHO | 67th | 13 | |
| 2025 | SS-Green Light Racing | 07 | Chevy | | | | | | | | | | | | | | | | | | | | | | | GLN; 34 | DAY | PIR | GTW | BRI | KAN | | | | | | 67th | 13 | |
| 2026 | Pardus Racing Inc. | 50 | Chevy | DAY | ATL | COA; 27 | PHO | LVS | DAR | MAR | CAR | BRI | KAN | TAL | TEX | GLN; 21 | DOV | CLT | NSH | POC | COR; 18 | SON | CHI | ATL | | | | | | | | | | | | HOM; 24 | 39th | 79 | |
| 2026 | DGM Racing with Jesse Iwuji Motorsports | 92 | Chevy | | | | | | | | | | | | | | | | | | | | | | IND; 30 | IOW | DAY | DAR; 23 | GTW | BRI | LVS | CLT | PHO | TAL | MAR | | 39th | 79 | |

^{*} Season still in progress
^{1} Ineligible for series points
