= 2020 Drive for the Cure 250 =

2020 Drive for the Cure 250 presented by Blue Cross Blue Shield of North Carolina
Race details
- Race 29 of 33 in the 2020 NASCAR Xfinity Series
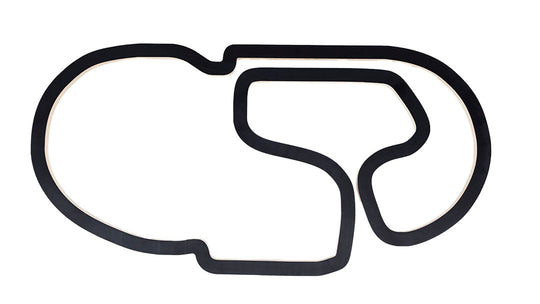
- Date: October 10, 2020
- Location: Concord, North Carolina, Charlotte Motor Speedway
- Course: Permanent racing facility
- Course length: 2.28 miles (3.669 km)
- Distance: 68 laps, 155.04 mi (249.513 km)
- Scheduled distance: 67 laps, 152.76 mi (245.843 km)
- Average speed: 58.041 miles per hour (93.408 km/h)

Most laps led
Driver	Chase Briscoe	Stewart-Haas Racing
- Laps: 23

Winner
No. 16	A. J. Allmendinger	Kaulig Racing

Television in the United States
- Network: NBC, CNBC
- Announcers: Rick Allen, Jeff Burton, Dale Earnhardt Jr., Steve Letarte

Radio in the United States
- Radio: Performance Racing Network

The 2020 Drive for the Cure 250 presented by Blue Cross Blue Shield of North Carolina was the 29th stock car race of the 2020 NASCAR Xfinity Series, the 48th iteration of the event, the third race of the playoffs, and the final, and therefore cutoff race for the Round of 12. The race took place on Saturday, October 10, 2020, in Concord, North Carolina at the Charlotte Motor Speedway roval, a permanent 2.28 miles (3.67 km) road course, using part of the oval and part of the infield road course. The race was extended from 67 to 68 laps due to NASCAR overtime finish. A. J. Allmendinger would survive the race, avoiding crashing in the rain and a charging Noah Gragson to win the race. Noah Gragson of JR Motorsports and Daniel Hemric of JR Motorsports would finish 2nd and 3rd, respectively.

The race is known for the heavy rain that fell down on the track that day, leading to several spins and wrecks. Numerous cars were spinning during 7 laps to go in Stage 1, starting with Kyle Weatherman. Eventually, the rain would get so bad that the leader spun from the lead, multiple drivers ended up in the tire barriers (Tommy Joe Martins, Matt Mills, Austin Hill), and a red flag was thrown. While rain did still fall down, the race was continued and finished in the same day it was started. However, many drivers would still spin out or worse.

== Background ==
=== Entry list ===
#	Driver	Team	Make	Sponsor
0	Jeffrey Earnhardt	JD Motorsports	Chevrolet	Contec, Inc.
1	Michael Annett	JR Motorsports	Chevrolet	Pilot, Flying J
02	Brett Moffitt	Our Motorsports	Chevrolet	Our Motorsports
4	B.J. McLeod	JD Motorsports	Chevrolet	Swenson Advisors
5	Matt Mills	B. J. McLeod Motorsports	Toyota	J. F. Electric, Thompson Electric
6	Ryan Vargas	JD Motorsports	Chevrolet	TikTok
7	Justin Allgaier	JR Motorsports	Chevrolet	Brandt Professional Agriculture
07	Jade Buford	SS-Green Light Racing	Chevrolet	Big Machine Distillery
8	Daniel Hemric	JR Motorsports	Chevrolet	OnDeck Capital
08	Joe Graf, Jr.	SS-Green Light Racing	Chevrolet	Watchonista
9	Noah Gragson	JR Motorsports	Chevrolet	Lionel Racing NASCAR Authentics
10	Ross Chastain	Kaulig Racing	Chevrolet	Nutrien Ag Solutions
11	Justin Haley	Kaulig Racing	Chevrolet	LeafFilter Gutter Protection
13	Stephen Leicht	MBM Motorsports	Toyota	Jani-King
15	Jesse Little	JD Motorsports	Chevrolet	Tufco Flooring
16	A.J. Allmendinger	Kaulig Racing	Chevrolet	Ellsworth Advisors
17	Cody Ware	Rick Ware Racing	Ford	Thriv5 "Don't Just Live... Thriv5"
18	Riley Herbst	Joe Gibbs Racing	Toyota	Monster Energy
19	Brandon Jones	Joe Gibbs Racing	Toyota	Toyota Service Centers "Keep Your Toyota a Toyota"
20	Harrison Burton	Joe Gibbs Racing	Toyota	DEX Imaging
21	Kaz Grala	Richard Childress Racing	Chevrolet	Ruedebusch Development & Construction
22	Austin Cindric	Team Penske	Ford	Würth
36	Alex Labbé	DGM Racing	Chevrolet	Can-Am
39	Ryan Sieg	RSS Racing	Chevrolet	CMR Construction & Roofing
44	Tommy Joe Martins	Martins Motorsports	Chevrolet	AAN Adjusters
47	Kyle Weatherman	Mike Harmon Racing	Chevrolet	Thin Gold Line Solutions, #BackTheBlue
51	Jeremy Clements	Jeremy Clements Racing	Chevrolet	All South Electric
52	Kody Vanderwal	Jimmy Means Racing	Chevrolet	Alton Lewis McBride 3
61	Austin Hill	Hattori Racing Enterprises	Toyota	Aisin
66	Timmy Hill	MBM Motorsports	Toyota	LeithCars.com
68	Brandon Brown	Brandonbilt Motorsports	Chevrolet	Ray's Siding Co.
74	Gray Gaulding	Mike Harmon Racing	Chevrolet	CountOnMeNC.org
78	Josh Bilicki	B. J. McLeod Motorsports	Toyota	Insurance King
90	Preston Pardus	DGM Racing	Chevrolet	Chinchor Electric, Inc.
92	Josh Williams	DGM Racing	Chevrolet	Startron, General Formulations
93	Myatt Snider	RSS Racing	Chevrolet	Louisiana Hot Sauce
98	Chase Briscoe	Stewart-Haas Racing	Ford	Ford Performance Racing School, HighPoint.com
99	C.J. McLaughlin	B. J. McLeod Motorsports	Chevrolet	Trade Hounds, Carolina Industrial Trucks, Hyundai Material Handling
Official entry list

== Starting lineup ==
Qualifying was set by a formula set on the previous race. As a result, Noah Gragson of JR Motorsports was given the pole.

Pos.	#	Driver	Team	Make
1	9	Noah Gragson	JR Motorsports	Chevrolet
2	11	Justin Haley	Kaulig Racing	Chevrolet
3	8	Daniel Hemric	JR Motorsports	Chevrolet
4	19	Brandon Jones	Joe Gibbs Racing	Toyota
5	10	Ross Chastain	Kaulig Racing	Chevrolet
6	39	Ryan Sieg	RSS Racing	Chevrolet
7	68	Brandon Brown	Brandonbilt Motorsports	Chevrolet
8	98	Chase Briscoe	Stewart-Haas Racing	Ford
9	20	Harrison Burton	Joe Gibbs Racing	Toyota
10	7	Justin Allgaier	JR Motorsports	Chevrolet
11	22	Austin Cindric	Team Penske	Ford
12	21	Kaz Grala	Richard Childress Racing	Chevrolet
13	18	Riley Herbst	Joe Gibbs Racing	Toyota
14	1	Michael Annett	JR Motorsports	Chevrolet
15	92	Josh Williams	DGM Racing	Chevrolet
16	36	Alex Labbé	DGM Racing	Chevrolet
17	44	Tommy Joe Martins	Martins Motorsports	Chevrolet
18	51	Jeremy Clements	Jeremy Clements Racing	Chevrolet
19	02	Brett Moffitt	Our Motorsports	Chevrolet
20	66	Timmy Hill	MBM Motorsports	Toyota
21	93	Myatt Snider	RSS Racing	Chevrolet
22	16	A.J. Allmendinger	Kaulig Racing	Chevrolet
23	5	Matt Mills	B. J. McLeod Motorsports	Toyota
24	07	Jade Buford	SS-Green Light Racing	Chevrolet
25	6	Ryan Vargas	JD Motorsports	Chevrolet
26	0	Jeffrey Earnhardt	JD Motorsports	Chevrolet
27	61	Austin Hill	Hattori Racing Enterprises	Toyota
28	13	Stephen Leicht	MBM Motorsports	Toyota
29	4	B.J. McLeod	JD Motorsports	Chevrolet
30	90	Preston Pardus	DGM Racing	Chevrolet
31	08	Joe Graf, Jr.	SS-Green Light Racing	Chevrolet
32	78	Josh Bilicki	B. J. McLeod Motorsports	Toyota
33	74	Gray Gaulding	Mike Harmon Racing	Chevrolet
34	52	Kody Vanderwal	Jimmy Means Racing	Chevrolet
35	47	Kyle Weatherman	Mike Harmon Racing	Chevrolet
36	99	C.J. McLaughlin	B. J. McLeod Motorsports	Chevrolet
37	15	Jesse Little	JD Motorsports	Chevrolet
38	17	Cody Ware	Rick Ware Racing	Ford
Official starting lineup

== Race results ==
Stage 1 Laps: 20

Fin	#	Driver	Team	Make	Pts
1	21	Kaz Grala	Richard Childress Racing	Chevrolet	10
2	9	Noah Gragson	JR Motorsports	Chevrolet	9
3	36	Alex Labbé	DGM Racing	Chevrolet	8
4	11	Justin Haley	Kaulig Racing	Chevrolet	7
5	7	Justin Allgaier	JR Motorsports	Chevrolet	6
6	10	Ross Chastain	Kaulig Racing	Chevrolet	5
7	8	Daniel Hemric	JR Motorsports	Chevrolet	4
8	92	Josh Williams	DGM Racing	Chevrolet	3
9	90	Preston Pardus	DGM Racing	Chevrolet	2
10	68	Brandon Brown	Brandonbilt Motorsports	Chevrolet	1

Stage 2 Laps: 20

Fin	#	Driver	Team	Make	Pts
1	98	Chase Briscoe	Stewart-Haas Racing	Ford	10
2	10	Ross Chastain	Kaulig Racing	Chevrolet	9
3	36	Alex Labbé	DGM Racing	Chevrolet	8
4	22	Austin Cindric	Team Penske	Ford	7
5	9	Noah Gragson	JR Motorsports	Chevrolet	6
6	8	Daniel Hemric	JR Motorsports	Chevrolet	5
7	68	Brandon Brown	Brandonbilt Motorsports	Chevrolet	4
8	7	Justin Allgaier	JR Motorsports	Chevrolet	3
9	74	Gray Gaulding	Mike Harmon Racing	Chevrolet	0
10	07	Jade Buford	SS-Green Light Racing	Chevrolet	1

Stage 3 Laps: 28

Fin	St	#	Driver	Team	Make	Laps	Led	Status	Pts
1	22	16	A.J. Allmendinger	Kaulig Racing	Chevrolet	68	12	running	40
2	1	9	Noah Gragson	JR Motorsports	Chevrolet	68	16	running	50
3	3	8	Daniel Hemric	JR Motorsports	Chevrolet	68	0	running	43
4	16	36	Alex Labbé	DGM Racing	Chevrolet	68	0	running	49
5	5	10	Ross Chastain	Kaulig Racing	Chevrolet	68	0	running	46
6	11	22	Austin Cindric	Team Penske	Ford	68	0	running	38
7	38	17	Cody Ware	Rick Ware Racing	Ford	68	0	running	30
8	24	07	Jade Buford	SS-Green Light Racing	Chevrolet	68	0	running	30
9	14	1	Michael Annett	JR Motorsports	Chevrolet	68	0	running	28
10	4	19	Brandon Jones	Joe Gibbs Racing	Toyota	68	0	running	27
11	26	0	Jeffrey Earnhardt	JD Motorsports	Chevrolet	68	0	running	26
12	13	18	Riley Herbst	Joe Gibbs Racing	Toyota	68	7	running	25
13	32	78	Josh Bilicki	B. J. McLeod Motorsports	Toyota	68	0	running	24
14	21	93	Myatt Snider	RSS Racing	Chevrolet	68	0	running	23
15	31	08	Joe Graf, Jr.	SS-Green Light Racing	Chevrolet	68	0	running	22
16	18	51	Jeremy Clements	Jeremy Clements Racing	Chevrolet	68	0	running	21
17	25	6	Ryan Vargas	JD Motorsports	Chevrolet	68	0	running	20
18	8	98	Chase Briscoe	Stewart-Haas Racing	Ford	68	23	running	29
19	20	66	Timmy Hill	MBM Motorsports	Toyota	68	0	running	0
20	34	52	Kody Vanderwal	Jimmy Means Racing	Chevrolet	68	0	running	17
21	6	39	Ryan Sieg	RSS Racing	Chevrolet	68	0	running	16
22	29	4	B.J. McLeod	JD Motorsports	Chevrolet	68	0	running	15
23	10	7	Justin Allgaier	JR Motorsports	Chevrolet	68	0	running	23
24	28	13	Stephen Leicht	MBM Motorsports	Toyota	68	0	running	13
25	23	5	Matt Mills	B. J. McLeod Motorsports	Toyota	67	0	running	12
26	7	68	Brandon Brown	Brandonbilt Motorsports	Chevrolet	63	0	crash	16
27	17	44	Tommy Joe Martins	Martins Motorsports	Chevrolet	63	0	running	10
28	33	74	Gray Gaulding	Mike Harmon Racing	Chevrolet	60	0	electrical	0
29	36	99	C.J. McLaughlin	B. J. McLeod Motorsports	Chevrolet	54	0	running	8
30	37	15	Jesse Little	JD Motorsports	Chevrolet	48	0	engine	7
31	12	21	Kaz Grala	Richard Childress Racing	Chevrolet	44	3	suspension	16
32	30	90	Preston Pardus	DGM Racing	Chevrolet	41	0	ignition	7
33	9	20	Harrison Burton	Joe Gibbs Racing	Toyota	37	0	transmission	4
34	15	92	Josh Williams	DGM Racing	Chevrolet	36	0	crash	6
35	2	11	Justin Haley	Kaulig Racing	Chevrolet	34	7	crash	9
36	27	61	Austin Hill	Hattori Racing Enterprises	Toyota	13	0	crash	0
37	35	47	Kyle Weatherman	Mike Harmon Racing	Chevrolet	13	0	crash	1
38	19	02	Brett Moffitt	Our Motorsports	Chevrolet	2	0	crash	0
Official race results

Previous race: 2020 Ag-Pro 300	NASCAR Xfinity Series; 2020 season	Next race: 2020 Kansas Lottery 300
