= 2023 Pennzoil 150 =

22nd race of the 2023 NASCAR Xfinity Series

2023 Pennzoil 150 Presented by Advance Auto Parts
Race details
- Race 22 of 33 of the 2023 NASCAR Xfinity Series
- Date: August 12, 2023
- Official name: 20th Annual Pennzoil 150 Presented by Advance Auto Parts
- Location: Indianapolis Motor Speedway, Speedway, Indiana
- Course: Permanent racing facility
- Course length: 2.439 miles (3.925 km)
- Distance: 62 laps, 151 mi (243 km)
- Scheduled distance: 62 laps, 151 mi (243 km)
- Average speed: 77.174 mph (124.200 km/h)

Pole position
Driver	A. J. Allmendinger	Kaulig Racing
- Time: 1:34.428

Most laps led
Driver	Ty Gibbs	Joe Gibbs Racing
- Laps: 28

Winner
No. 19	Ty Gibbs	Joe Gibbs Racing

Television in the United States
- Network: USA
- Announcers: Rick Allen, Jeff Burton, Steve Letarte, and Dale Earnhardt Jr.

Radio in the United States
- Radio: PRN; IMS Radio

The 2023 Pennzoil 150 Presented by Advance Auto Parts was the 22nd stock car race of the 2023 NASCAR Xfinity Series, and the 20th iteration of the event. The race was held on Saturday, August 12, 2023, in Speedway, Indiana at the Indianapolis Motor Speedway road course, a 2.439 miles (3.925 km) permanent road course. The race took the scheduled 62 laps to complete. Ty Gibbs, driving for Joe Gibbs Racing, would dominate the final 15 laps of the race, and earn his 12th career NASCAR Xfinity Series win, and his first of the season. Gibbs and A. J. Allmendinger would dominate the entire race, leading 28 and 21 laps, respectively. To fill out the podium, Sam Mayer, driving for JR Motorsports, and Allmendinger, driving for Kaulig Racing, would finish 2nd and 3rd, respectively.

== Background ==
The Indianapolis Motor Speedway, located in Speedway, Indiana, (an enclave suburb of Indianapolis) in the United States, is the home of the Indianapolis 500 and the Brickyard 400. It is located on the corner of 16th Street and Georgetown Road, approximately six miles (10 km) west of Downtown Indianapolis.

Constructed in 1909, it is the original speedway, the first racing facility so named. It has a permanent seating capacity estimated at 235,000 with infield seating raising capacity to an approximate 400,000. It is the highest-capacity sports venue in the world.

=== Entry list ===
- (R) denotes rookie driver.
- (i) denotes driver who is ineligible for series driver points.

#	Driver	Team	Make
00	Cole Custer	Stewart-Haas Racing	Ford
1	Sam Mayer	JR Motorsports	Chevrolet
02	Blaine Perkins (R)	Our Motorsports	Chevrolet
2	Sheldon Creed	Richard Childress Racing	Chevrolet
4	Kyle Weatherman	JD Motorsports	Chevrolet
6	Brennan Poole	JD Motorsports	Chevrolet
07	Colin Garrett (i)	SS-Green Light Racing	Chevrolet
7	Justin Allgaier	JR Motorsports	Chevrolet
08	Camden Murphy	SS-Green Light Racing	Ford
8	Josh Berry	JR Motorsports	Chevrolet
9	Brandon Jones	JR Motorsports	Chevrolet
10	A. J. Allmendinger (i)	Kaulig Racing	Chevrolet
11	Daniel Hemric	Kaulig Racing	Chevrolet
16	Chandler Smith (R)	Kaulig Racing	Chevrolet
18	Sammy Smith (R)	Joe Gibbs Racing	Toyota
19	Ty Gibbs (i)	Joe Gibbs Racing	Toyota
20	John Hunter Nemechek	Joe Gibbs Racing	Toyota
21	Austin Hill	Richard Childress Racing	Chevrolet
24	Connor Mosack (R)	Sam Hunt Racing	Toyota
25	Brett Moffitt	AM Racing	Ford
26	Kaz Grala	Sam Hunt Racing	Toyota
27	Jeb Burton	Jordan Anderson Racing	Chevrolet
28	Kyle Sieg	RSS Racing	Ford
31	Parker Retzlaff (R)	Jordan Anderson Racing	Chevrolet
34	Andre Castro	Jesse Iwuji Motorsports	Chevrolet
35	Alex Labbé	Emerling-Gase Motorsports	Toyota
36	Josh Bilicki	DGM Racing	Chevrolet
38	Joe Graf Jr.	RSS Racing	Ford
39	Ryan Sieg	RSS Racing	Ford
43	Ryan Ellis	Alpha Prime Racing	Chevrolet
44	Conor Daly (i)	Alpha Prime Racing	Chevrolet
45	Sage Karam	Alpha Prime Racing	Chevrolet
48	Parker Kligerman	Big Machine Racing	Chevrolet
50	Preston Pardus	Pardus Racing	Chevrolet
51	Jeremy Clements	Jeremy Clements Racing	Chevrolet
53	Brad Perez	Emerling-Gase Motorsports	Chevrolet
66	Will Rodgers (i)	MBM Motorsports	Toyota
78	Anthony Alfredo	B. J. McLeod Motorsports	Chevrolet
88	Miguel Paludo	JR Motorsports	Chevrolet
91	Ross Chastain (i)	DGM Racing	Chevrolet
92	Josh Williams	DGM Racing	Chevrolet
98	Riley Herbst	Stewart-Haas Racing	Ford
Official entry list

== Practice ==
The first and only practice session was held on Saturday, August 12, at 9:35 AM EST, and would last for 20 minutes. A. J. Allmendinger, driving for Kaulig Racing, would set the fastest time in the session, with a lap of 1:40.181, and an average speed of 87.645 mph (141.051 km/h).

Pos.	#	Driver	Team	Make	Time	Speed
1	10	A. J. Allmendinger (i)	Kaulig Racing	Chevrolet	1:40.181	87.645
2	1	Sam Mayer	JR Motorsports	Chevrolet	1:40.545	87.328
3	19	Ty Gibbs (i)	Joe Gibbs Racing	Toyota	1:40.625	87.259
Full practice results

== Qualifying ==
Qualifying is scheduled to be held on Saturday, August 12, at 10:05 AM EST. Despite Indianapolis Motor Speedway being a road course, the qualifying system used was a multi-car, multi-lap system with only one round. In that round, whoever sets the fastest time will win the pole. A. J. Allmendinger, driving for Kaulig Racing, would score the pole for the race, with a lap of 1:34.428, and an average speed of 92.985 mph (149.645 km/h).

Pos.	#	Driver	Team	Make	Time	Speed
1	10	A. J. Allmendinger (i)	Kaulig Racing	Chevrolet	1:34.428	92.985
2	19	Ty Gibbs (i)	Joe Gibbs Racing	Toyota	1:35.075	92.352
3	8	Josh Berry	JR Motorsports	Chevrolet	1:35.086	92.342
4	21	Austin Hill	Richard Childress Racing	Chevrolet	1:35.207	92.224
5	11	Daniel Hemric	Kaulig Racing	Chevrolet	1:35.505	91.937
6	00	Cole Custer	Stewart-Haas Racing	Ford	1:35.622	91.824
7	91	Ross Chastain (i)	DGM Racing	Chevrolet	1:35.808	91.646
8	20	John Hunter Nemechek	Joe Gibbs Racing	Toyota	1:35.826	91.629
9	2	Sheldon Creed	Richard Childress Racing	Chevrolet	1:36.026	91.438
10	98	Riley Herbst	Stewart-Haas Racing	Ford	1:36.260	91.215
11	50	Preston Pardus	Pardus Racing	Chevrolet	1:36.265	91.211
12	48	Parker Kligerman	Big Machine Racing	Chevrolet	1:36.305	91.173
13	7	Justin Allgaier	JR Motorsports	Chevrolet	1:36.330	91.149
14	27	Jeb Burton	Jordan Anderson Racing	Chevrolet	1:36.488	91.000
15	1	Sam Mayer	JR Motorsports	Chevrolet	1:36.545	90.946
16	24	Connor Mosack (R)	Sam Hunt Racing	Toyota	1:36.695	90.805
17	18	Sammy Smith (R)	Joe Gibbs Racing	Toyota	1:36.719	90.783
18	16	Chandler Smith (R)	Kaulig Racing	Chevrolet	1:36.729	90.773
19	36	Josh Bilicki	DGM Racing	Chevrolet	1:36.748	90.755
20	51	Jeremy Clements	Jeremy Clements Racing	Chevrolet	1:36.942	90.574
21	26	Kaz Grala	Sam Hunt Racing	Toyota	1:37.080	90.445
22	88	Miguel Paludo	JR Motorsports	Chevrolet	1:37.119	90.409
23	25	Brett Moffitt	AM Racing	Ford	1:37.133	90.396
24	31	Parker Retzlaff (R)	Jordan Anderson Racing	Chevrolet	1:37.519	90.038
25	9	Brandon Jones	JR Motorsports	Chevrolet	1:37.727	89.846
26	35	Alex Labbé	Emerling-Gase Motorsports	Toyota	1:37.859	89.725
27	45	Sage Karam	Alpha Prime Racing	Chevrolet	1:38.202	89.412
28	34	Andre Castro	Jesse Iwuji Motorsports	Chevrolet	1:38.389	89.242
29	4	Kyle Weatherman	JD Motorsports	Chevrolet	1:38.405	89.227
30	39	Ryan Sieg	RSS Racing	Ford	1:38.484	89.156
31	53	Brad Perez	Emerling-Gase Motorsports	Chevrolet	1:38.484	89.156
32	78	Anthony Alfredo	B. J. McLeod Motorsports	Chevrolet	1:38.555	89.091
33	43	Ryan Ellis	Alpha Prime Racing	Chevrolet	1:38.611	89.041
Qualified by owner's points
34	92	Josh Williams	DGM Racing	Chevrolet	1:39.080	88.619
35	6	Brennan Poole	JD Motorsports	Chevrolet	1:40.218	87.613
36	28	Kyle Sieg	RSS Racing	Ford	1:40.752	87.149
37	38	Joe Graf Jr.	RSS Racing	Ford	1:41.081	86.865
38	02	Blaine Perkins (R)	Our Motorsports	Chevrolet	–	–
Failed to qualify
39	08	Camden Murphy	SS-Green Light Racing	Ford	1:39.629	88.131
40	44	Conor Daly (i)	Alpha Prime Racing	Chevrolet	1:39.781	87.997
41	66	Will Rodgers (i)	MBM Motorsports	Toyota	1:39.972	87.829
42	07	Colin Garrett (i)	SS-Green Light Racing	Chevrolet	1:41.431	86.565
Official qualifying results
Official starting lineup

== Race results ==
Stage 1 Laps: 20

Pos.	#	Driver	Team	Make	Pts
1	10	A. J. Allmendinger (i)	Kaulig Racing	Chevrolet	0
2	1	Sam Mayer	JR Motorsports	Chevrolet	9
3	11	Daniel Hemric	Kaulig Racing	Chevrolet	8
4	48	Parker Kligerman	Big Machine Racing	Chevrolet	7
5	7	Justin Allgaier	JR Motorsports	Chevrolet	6
6	19	Ty Gibbs (i)	Joe Gibbs Racing	Toyota	0
7	31	Parker Retzlaff (R)	Jordan Anderson Racing	Chevrolet	4
8	16	Chandler Smith (R)	Kaulig Racing	Chevrolet	3
9	8	Josh Berry	JR Motorsports	Chevrolet	2
10	00	Cole Custer	Stewart-Haas Racing	Ford	1

Stage 2 Laps: 20

Pos.	#	Driver	Team	Make	Pts
1	10	A. J. Allmendinger (i)	Kaulig Racing	Chevrolet	0
2	19	Ty Gibbs (i)	Joe Gibbs Racing	Toyota	0
3	1	Sam Mayer	JR Motorsports	Chevrolet	8
4	2	Sheldon Creed	Richard Childress Racing	Chevrolet	7
5	98	Riley Herbst	Stewart-Haas Racing	Ford	6
6	21	Austin Hill	Richard Childress Racing	Chevrolet	5
7	16	Chandler Smith (R)	Kaulig Racing	Chevrolet	4
8	20	John Hunter Nemechek	Joe Gibbs Racing	Toyota	3
9	11	Daniel Hemric	Kaulig Racing	Chevrolet	2
10	51	Jeremy Clements	Jeremy Clements Racing	Chevrolet	1

Stage 3 Laps: 22

Pos.	St	#	Driver	Team	Make	Laps	Led	Status	Pts
1	2	19	Ty Gibbs (i)	Joe Gibbs Racing	Toyota	62	28	Running	0
2	15	1	Sam Mayer	JR Motorsports	Chevrolet	62	5	Running	52
3	1	10	A. J. Allmendinger (i)	Kaulig Racing	Chevrolet	62	21	Running	0
4	4	21	Austin Hill	Richard Childress Racing	Chevrolet	62	0	Running	38
5	13	7	Justin Allgaier	JR Motorsports	Chevrolet	62	0	Running	38
6	6	00	Cole Custer	Stewart-Haas Racing	Ford	62	0	Running	32
7	12	48	Parker Kligerman	Big Machine Racing	Chevrolet	62	0	Running	37
8	9	2	Sheldon Creed	Richard Childress Racing	Chevrolet	62	1	Running	36
9	21	26	Kaz Grala	Sam Hunt Racing	Toyota	62	0	Running	28
10	23	25	Brett Moffitt	AM Racing	Ford	62	0	Running	27
11	26	35	Alex Labbé	Emerling-Gase Motorsports	Toyota	62	0	Running	26
12	10	98	Riley Herbst	Stewart-Haas Racing	Ford	62	0	Running	31
13	8	20	John Hunter Nemechek	Joe Gibbs Racing	Toyota	62	0	Running	27
14	3	8	Josh Berry	JR Motorsports	Chevrolet	62	2	Running	25
15	27	45	Sage Karam	Alpha Prime Racing	Chevrolet	62	0	Running	22
16	14	27	Jeb Burton	Jordan Anderson Racing	Chevrolet	62	0	Running	21
17	24	31	Parker Retzlaff (R)	Jordan Anderson Racing	Chevrolet	62	0	Running	24
18	19	36	Josh Bilicki	DGM Racing	Chevrolet	62	1	Running	19
19	20	51	Jeremy Clements	Jeremy Clements Racing	Chevrolet	62	1	Running	19
20	29	4	Kyle Weatherman	JD Motorsports	Chevrolet	62	0	Running	17
21	25	9	Brandon Jones	JR Motorsports	Chevrolet	62	0	Running	16
22	22	88	Miguel Paludo	JR Motorsports	Chevrolet	62	0	Running	15
23	32	78	Anthony Alfredo	B. J. McLeod Motorsports	Chevrolet	62	0	Running	14
24	11	50	Preston Pardus	Pardus Racing	Chevrolet	62	0	Running	13
25	35	6	Brennan Poole	JD Motorsports	Chevrolet	62	0	Running	12
26	16	24	Connor Mosack (R)	Sam Hunt Racing	Toyota	62	0	Running	11
27	5	11	Daniel Hemric	Kaulig Racing	Chevrolet	61	3	Running	20
28	17	18	Sammy Smith (R)	Joe Gibbs Racing	Toyota	61	0	Running	9
29	33	43	Ryan Ellis	Alpha Prime Racing	Chevrolet	61	0	Running	8
30	36	28	Kyle Sieg	RSS Racing	Ford	61	0	Running	7
31	38	02	Blaine Perkins (R)	Our Motorsports	Chevrolet	60	0	Running	6
32	30	39	Ryan Sieg	RSS Racing	Ford	57	0	Suspension	5
33	34	92	Josh Williams	DGM Racing	Chevrolet	57	0	Running	4
34	18	16	Chandler Smith (R)	Kaulig Racing	Chevrolet	56	0	Suspension	10
35	37	38	Joe Graf Jr.	RSS Racing	Ford	46	0	Axle	2
36	28	34	Andre Castro	Jesse Iwuji Motorsports	Chevrolet	39	0	Suspension	1
37	7	91	Ross Chastain (i)	DGM Racing	Chevrolet	38	0	Suspension	0
38	31	53	Brad Perez	Emerling-Gase Motorsports	Chevrolet	24	0	Brakes	1
Official race results

== Standings after the race ==
Drivers' Championship standings

	Pos	Driver	Points
1	1	Austin Hill	849
1	2	John Hunter Nemechek	838 (-11)
	3	Justin Allgaier	815 (–34)
	4	Cole Custer	737 (–112)
	5	Josh Berry	685 (–164)
	6	Sam Mayer	682 (–167)
	7	Chandler Smith	622 (–227)
	8	Daniel Hemric	621 (–228)
	9	Riley Herbst	605 (–244)
1	10	Sheldon Creed	588 (–261)
1	11	Parker Kligerman	571 (–278)
2	12	Sammy Smith	567 (–282)
Official driver's standings

- Note: Only the first 12 positions are included for the driver standings.

Previous race: 2023 Cabo Wabo 250	NASCAR Xfinity Series; 2023 season	Next race: 2023 Shriners Children's 200 at The Glen
