= 2024 National Debt Relief 250 =

32nd race of the 2024 NASCAR Xfinity Series

Race details
- Race 32 of 33 of the 2024 NASCAR Xfinity Series
- Date: November 2, 2024
- Location: Martinsville Speedway in Ridgeway, Virginia
- Course: Permanent racing facility
- Course length: 0.526 miles (0.847 km)
- Distance: 250 laps, 131 mi (211 km)
- Scheduled distance: 250 laps, 131 mi (211 km)
- Average speed: 60.000 mph (96.561 km/h)

Pole position
Driver	Parker Retzlaff	Jordan Anderson Racing
- Time: 19.901

Most laps led
Driver	Aric Almirola	Joe Gibbs Racing
- Laps: 150

Winner
No. 20	Aric Almirola	Joe Gibbs Racing

Television in the United States
- Network: The CW (produced by NBC Sports)
- Announcers: Rick Allen, Jeff Burton and Steve Letarte.

Radio in the United States
- Radio: MRN

The 2024 National Debt Relief 250 was the 32nd stock car race of the 2024 NASCAR Xfinity Series, the sixth race of the Playoffs, the final race of the Round of 8, and the fifth iteration of the event. The race was held on Saturday, November 2, 2024, at Martinsville Speedway in Ridgeway, Virginia, a 0.526 miles (0.847 km) permanent paper-clip shaped racetrack. The race took the scheduled 250 laps to complete. In an action-packed race with numerous cautions, Aric Almirola, driving for Joe Gibbs Racing, would put on a dominating performance, winning both stages and leading a race-high 150 laps to earn his eighth career NASCAR Xfinity Series win, and his third of the season. He would also lock the No. 20 team into the Championship 4 of the owner's playoffs. To fill out the podium, Sammy Smith, driving for JR Motorsports, and Chandler Smith, driving for Joe Gibbs Racing, would finish 2nd and 3rd, respectively.

Following the race, Chandler Smith and Cole Custer confronted each other on pit road, with Smith taking a swing at Custer before being pulled away by track officials and pit crew members. Chandler, Jesse Love, Sam Mayer, and Sammy Smith were eliminated from playoff contention following the race. Austin Hill, A. J. Allmendinger, Custer, and Justin Allgaier would advance into the Championship 4.

== Report ==
=== Background ===
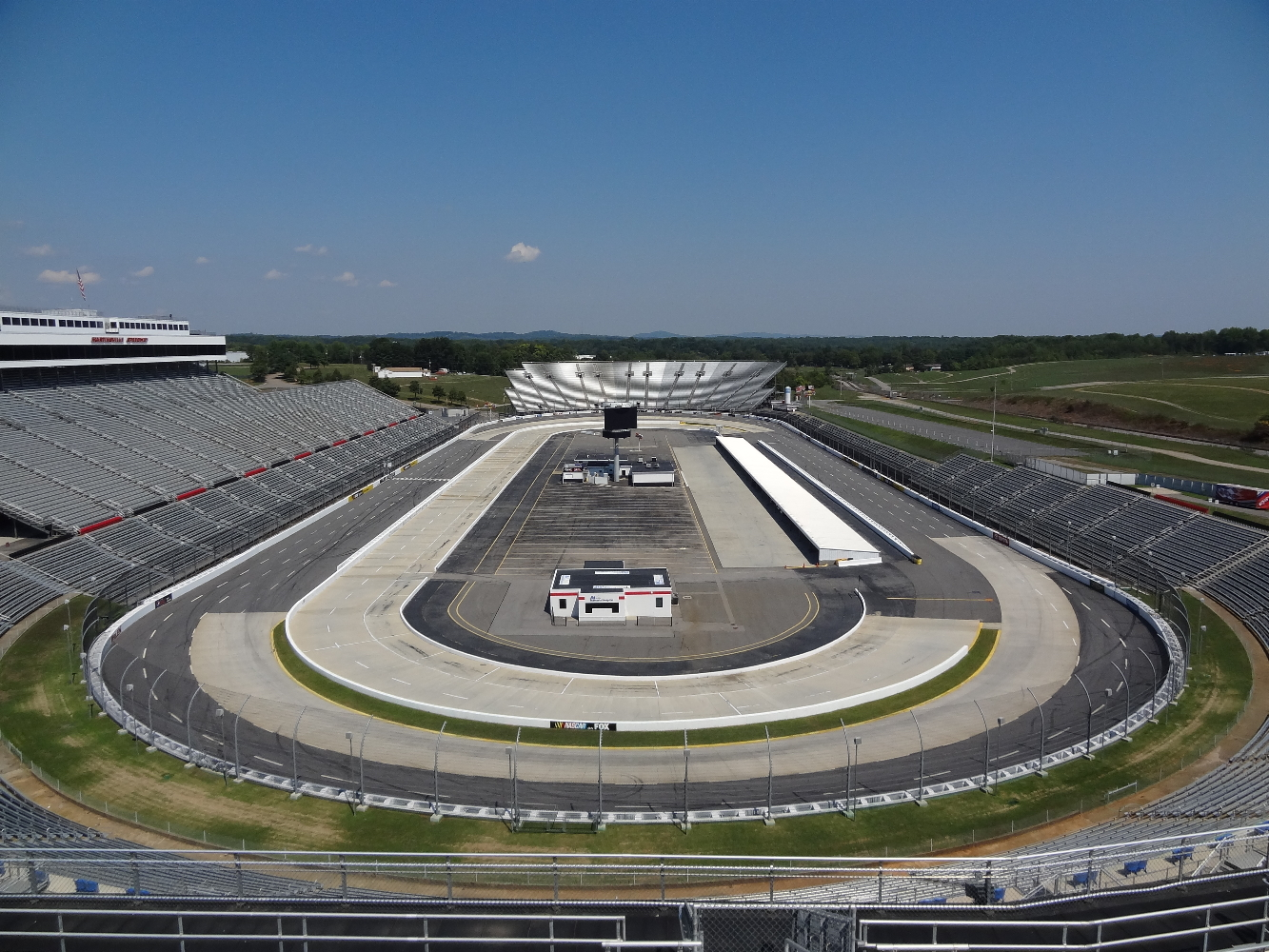
Martinsville Speedway, the circuit where the race was held.

Martinsville Speedway is an International Speedway Corporation-owned NASCAR stock car racing track located in Henry County, in Ridgeway, Virginia, just to the south of Martinsville. At 0.526 miles (0.847 km) in length, it is the shortest track in the NASCAR Cup Series. The track is also one of the first paved oval tracks in NASCAR, being built in 1947 by H. Clay Earles. It is also the only race track that has been on the NASCAR circuit from its beginning in 1948. Along with this, Martinsville is the only NASCAR oval track on the entire NASCAR track circuit to have asphalt surfaces on the straightaways, then concrete to cover the turns.

==== Entry list ====
- (R) denotes rookie driver.
- (i) denotes driver who is ineligible for series driver points.
- (P) denotes playoff driver.
- (OP) denotes owner's playoff car.

#	Driver	Team	Make
00	Cole Custer (P)	Stewart–Haas Racing	Ford
1	Sam Mayer (P)	JR Motorsports	Chevrolet
2	Jesse Love (R) (P)	Richard Childress Racing	Chevrolet
5	Anthony Alfredo	Our Motorsports	Chevrolet
07	Patrick Emerling	SS-Green Light Racing	Chevrolet
7	Justin Allgaier (P)	JR Motorsports	Chevrolet
8	Sammy Smith (P)	JR Motorsports	Chevrolet
9	Brandon Jones	JR Motorsports	Chevrolet
11	Josh Williams	Kaulig Racing	Chevrolet
14	Greg Van Alst	SS-Green Light Racing	Chevrolet
15	Dylan Lupton	AM Racing	Ford
16	A. J. Allmendinger (P)	Kaulig Racing	Chevrolet
18	Sheldon Creed	Joe Gibbs Racing	Toyota
19	William Sawalich (i)	Joe Gibbs Racing	Toyota
20	Aric Almirola (OP)	Joe Gibbs Racing	Toyota
21	Austin Hill (P)	Richard Childress Racing	Chevrolet
26	Bubba Pollard	Sam Hunt Racing	Toyota
27	Jeb Burton	Jordan Anderson Racing	Chevrolet
28	Ryan Sieg	RSS Racing	Ford
29	Blaine Perkins	RSS Racing	Ford
31	Parker Retzlaff	Jordan Anderson Racing	Chevrolet
35	Carson Ware	Joey Gase Motorsports	Chevrolet
38	Matt DiBenedetto	RSS Racing	Ford
39	Kyle Sieg	RSS Racing	Ford
42	Leland Honeyman (R)	Young's Motorsports	Chevrolet
43	Ryan Ellis	Alpha Prime Racing	Chevrolet
44	Brennan Poole	Alpha Prime Racing	Chevrolet
45	Garrett Smithley	Alpha Prime Racing	Chevrolet
48	Parker Kligerman	Big Machine Racing	Chevrolet
50	Preston Pardus	Pardus Racing	Chevrolet
51	Jeremy Clements	Jeremy Clements Racing	Chevrolet
53	Mason Maggio (i)	Joey Gase Motorsports	Ford
74	Logan Bearden	Mike Harmon Racing	Chevrolet
81	Chandler Smith (P)	Joe Gibbs Racing	Toyota
91	Myatt Snider	DGM Racing	Chevrolet
92	Dawson Cram (i)	DGM Racing	Chevrolet
97	Shane van Gisbergen (R)	Kaulig Racing	Chevrolet
98	Riley Herbst	Stewart–Haas Racing	Ford
Official entry list

== Practice ==
For practice, drivers were separated into two groups, Group A and B. Both sessions were 15 minutes long, and was held on Friday, November 1, at 3:35 PM EST. Jesse Love, driving for Richard Childress Racing, would set the fastest time between both sessions, with a lap of 20.454, and a speed of 92.579 mph (148.991 km/h).

Pos.	#	Driver	Team	Make	Time	Speed
1	2	Jesse Love (R) (P)	Richard Childress Racing	Chevrolet	20.454	92.579
2	38	Matt DiBenedetto	RSS Racing	Ford	20.465	92.529
3	19	William Sawalich (i)	Joe Gibbs Racing	Toyota	20.472	92.497
Full practice results

== Qualifying ==
Qualifying was held on Friday, November 1, at 4:10 PM EST. Since Martinsville Speedway is a short track, the qualifying system used is a single-car, two-lap system with only one round. Drivers will be on track by themselves and will have two laps to post a qualifying time, and whoever sets the fastest time will win the pole.

Parker Retzlaff, driving for Jordan Anderson Racing, would score the pole for the race, with a lap of 19.901, and a speed of 95.151 mph (153.131 km/h).

No drivers would fail to qualify.

=== Qualifying results ===
Pos.	#	Driver	Team	Make	Time	Speed
1	31	Parker Retzlaff	Jordan Anderson Racing	Chevrolet	19.901	95.151
2	5	Anthony Alfredo	Our Motorsports	Chevrolet	19.913	95.094
3	81	Chandler Smith (P)	Joe Gibbs Racing	Toyota	19.917	95.075
4	2	Jesse Love (R) (P)	Richard Childress Racing	Chevrolet	19.922	95.051
5	7	Justin Allgaier (P)	JR Motorsports	Chevrolet	19.934	94.993
6	21	Austin Hill (P)	Richard Childress Racing	Chevrolet	19.940	94.965
7	8	Sammy Smith (P)	JR Motorsports	Chevrolet	19.963	94.855
8	18	Sheldon Creed	Joe Gibbs Racing	Toyota	19.964	94.851
9	20	Aric Almirola (OP)	Joe Gibbs Racing	Toyota	19.981	94.770
10	00	Cole Custer (P)	Stewart–Haas Racing	Ford	20.019	94.590
11	16	A. J. Allmendinger (P)	Kaulig Racing	Chevrolet	20.026	94.557
12	1	Sam Mayer (P)	JR Motorsports	Chevrolet	20.039	94.496
13	98	Riley Herbst	Stewart–Haas Racing	Ford	20.107	94.176
14	9	Brandon Jones	JR Motorsports	Chevrolet	20.144	94.003
15	19	William Sawalich (i)	Joe Gibbs Racing	Toyota	20.152	93.966
16	38	Matt DiBenedetto	RSS Racing	Ford	20.192	93.780
17	26	Bubba Pollard	Sam Hunt Racing	Toyota	20.204	93.724
18	48	Parker Kligerman	Big Machine Racing	Chevrolet	20.210	93.696
19	44	Brennan Poole	Alpha Prime Racing	Chevrolet	20.213	93.682
20	97	Shane van Gisbergen (R)	Kaulig Racing	Chevrolet	20.240	93.557
21	27	Jeb Burton	Jordan Anderson Racing	Chevrolet	20.310	93.235
22	91	Myatt Snider	DGM Racing	Chevrolet	20.318	93.198
23	11	Josh Williams	Kaulig Racing	Chevrolet	20.320	93.189
24	29	Blaine Perkins	RSS Racing	Ford	20.322	93.180
25	42	Leland Honeyman (R)	Young's Motorsports	Chevrolet	20.345	93.074
26	43	Ryan Ellis	Alpha Prime Racing	Chevrolet	20.350	93.052
27	39	Kyle Sieg	RSS Racing	Ford	20.456	92.569
28	92	Dawson Cram (i)	DGM Racing	Chevrolet	20.502	92.362
29	51	Jeremy Clements	Jeremy Clements Racing	Chevrolet	20.505	92.348
30	45	Garrett Smithley	Alpha Prime Racing	Chevrolet	20.613	91.864
31	15	Dylan Lupton	AM Racing	Ford	20.658	91.664
32	50	Preston Pardus	Pardus Racing	Chevrolet	20.690	91.522
33	35	Carson Ware	Joey Gase Motorsports	Chevrolet	20.919	90.521
Qualified by owner's points
34	74	Logan Bearden	Mike Harmon Racing	Chevrolet	20.919	90.521
35	07	Patrick Emerling	SS-Green Light Racing	Chevrolet	20.923	90.503
36	53	Mason Maggio (i)	Joey Gase Motorsports	Ford	20.931	90.469
37	14	Greg Van Alst	SS-Green Light Racing	Chevrolet	21.875	86.565
38	28	Ryan Sieg	RSS Racing	Ford	–	–
Official qualifying results
Official starting lineup

== Post-race fight ==
During the race, both Chandler Smith and Cole Custer were racing each other hard for 2nd. The two had been racing each other hard during the course of the year including at Kansas a month before where the two had a conversation about the incident after the race. During one of the early stages of the race, Smith moved Custer to take the position from him. On a restart with 29 to go, Smith was in 2nd with Custer right behind him when Custer bumped Smith into turn 1 sending him up the track. But Custer also slid up the track and both lost 2 positions in the process. This angered Smith as Smith said on the radio "What he is gonna do is get his fucking ass beat after the race if he keeps fucking around little punk ass bitch!" Both were able to get top 5 finishes after another late race restart with Smith finishing 3rd and Custer finishing 4th, but this eliminated Smith from contending for the Championship as he needed a win to do so as he was 28 points behind Custer for the last spot in the Championship to end the race. After the race, the two parked on pit road behind one another and got out of their cars. Smith and Custer got into an intense screaming match at one another for about 10 seconds before Smith slapped Custer across the face in the process. Custer's team ran over to the scene and were immeadietly there and shoved Smith back to protect their driver with NASCAR officials and security there to break up the fight. In his interview, Custer said, "Obviously he's not happy but at the end of the day, he's put us in the wall a few times this year and his mistakes caught up with him. He used the bumper on me. I used the bumper on him. So what comes around goes around in this deal. I don't know how we're not even. Then, he punches me in the face. I can't even tell if he really punched me in the face, it was so soft." When asked about the slap, Smith said, "I was planning to do more than that. I was extremely pissed off. I gave him five laps before that caution came out and beat his bumper off and never shipped him or anything like that. Then finally, it's like, alright, the laps are winding down. I’m in a must-win. The 20's [Almirola] starting to drive away. He was really good all day. I can't waste any more time with him. So I finally had a good enough run and pushed him up the racetrack and went on our way." He also mentioned he was surprised Custer chose the outside for the restart despite being in 3rd. He finished his interview saying, "He's got more stakes than I do next weekend." Eventually, NASCAR fined Smith $10,000 for the slap.

== Race results ==
Stage 1 Laps: 60

Pos.	#	Driver	Team	Make	Pts
1	20	Aric Almirola (OP)	Joe Gibbs Racing	Toyota	10
2	00	Cole Custer (P)	Stewart–Haas Racing	Ford	9
3	7	Justin Allgaier (P)	JR Motorsports	Chevrolet	8
4	81	Chandler Smith (P)	Joe Gibbs Racing	Toyota	7
5	2	Jesse Love (R) (P)	Richard Childress Racing	Chevrolet	6
6	98	Riley Herbst	Stewart–Haas Racing	Ford	5
7	11	Josh Williams	Kaulig Racing	Chevrolet	4
8	8	Sammy Smith (P)	JR Motorsports	Chevrolet	3
9	18	Sheldon Creed	Joe Gibbs Racing	Toyota	2
10	27	Jeb Burton	Jordan Anderson Racing	Chevrolet	1

Stage 2 Laps: 60

Pos.	#	Driver	Team	Make	Pts
1	20	Aric Almirola (OP)	Joe Gibbs Racing	Toyota	10
2	28	Ryan Sieg	RSS Racing	Ford	9
3	18	Sheldon Creed	Joe Gibbs Racing	Toyota	8
4	8	Sammy Smith (P)	JR Motorsports	Chevrolet	7
5	7	Justin Allgaier (P)	JR Motorsports	Chevrolet	6
6	81	Chandler Smith (P)	Joe Gibbs Racing	Toyota	5
7	00	Cole Custer (P)	Stewart–Haas Racing	Ford	4
8	98	Riley Herbst	Stewart–Haas Racing	Ford	3
9	19	William Sawalich (i)	Joe Gibbs Racing	Toyota	0
10	44	Brennan Poole	Alpha Prime Racing	Chevrolet	1

Stage 3 Laps: 136

Pos.	St	#	Driver	Team	Make	Laps	Led	Status	Pts
1	9	20	Aric Almirola (OP)	Joe Gibbs Racing	Toyota	250	150	Running	60
2	7	8	Sammy Smith (P)	JR Motorsports	Chevrolet	250	0	Running	45
3	3	81	Chandler Smith (P)	Joe Gibbs Racing	Toyota	250	34	Running	46
4	10	00	Cole Custer (P)	Stewart–Haas Racing	Ford	250	17	Running	46
5	5	7	Justin Allgaier (P)	JR Motorsports	Chevrolet	250	0	Running	46
6	8	18	Sheldon Creed	Joe Gibbs Racing	Toyota	250	13	Running	41
7	2	5	Anthony Alfredo	Our Motorsports	Chevrolet	250	0	Running	30
8	18	48	Parker Kligerman	Big Machine Racing	Chevrolet	250	0	Running	29
9	21	27	Jeb Burton	Jordan Anderson Racing	Chevrolet	250	0	Running	29
10	22	91	Myatt Snider	DGM Racing	Chevrolet	250	0	Running	27
11	13	98	Riley Herbst	Stewart–Haas Racing	Ford	250	0	Running	34
12	4	2	Jesse Love (R) (P)	Richard Childress Racing	Chevrolet	250	0	Running	31
13	19	44	Brennan Poole	Alpha Prime Racing	Chevrolet	250	0	Running	25
14	6	21	Austin Hill (P)	Richard Childress Racing	Chevrolet	250	0	Running	23
15	38	28	Ryan Sieg	RSS Racing	Ford	250	13	Running	31
16	16	38	Matt DiBenedetto	RSS Racing	Ford	250	0	Running	21
17	23	11	Josh Williams	Kaulig Racing	Chevrolet	250	0	Running	24
18	26	43	Ryan Ellis	Alpha Prime Racing	Chevrolet	250	0	Running	19
19	24	29	Blaine Perkins	RSS Racing	Ford	250	0	Running	18
20	31	15	Dylan Lupton	AM Racing	Ford	250	0	Running	17
21	27	39	Kyle Sieg	RSS Racing	Ford	250	3	Running	16
22	36	53	Mason Maggio (i)	Joey Gase Motorsports	Ford	250	0	Running	0
23	35	07	Patrick Emerling	SS-Green Light Racing	Chevrolet	250	0	Running	14
24	32	50	Preston Pardus	Pardus Racing	Chevrolet	250	0	Running	13
25	28	92	Dawson Cram (i)	DGM Racing	Chevrolet	250	0	Running	0
26	37	14	Greg Van Alst	SS-Green Light Racing	Chevrolet	250	0	Running	11
27	29	51	Jeremy Clements	Jeremy Clements Racing	Chevrolet	249	0	Running	10
28	20	97	Shane van Gisbergen (R)	Kaulig Racing	Chevrolet	249	0	Running	9
29	14	9	Brandon Jones	JR Motorsports	Chevrolet	234	0	DVP	8
30	12	1	Sam Mayer (P)	JR Motorsports	Chevrolet	228	0	Accident	7
31	17	26	Bubba Pollard	Sam Hunt Racing	Toyota	223	0	Running	6
32	30	45	Garrett Smithley	Alpha Prime Racing	Chevrolet	205	0	Ignition	5
33	15	19	William Sawalich (i)	Joe Gibbs Racing	Toyota	164	0	Suspension	0
34	34	74	Logan Bearden	Mike Harmon Racing	Chevrolet	162	0	Brakes	3
35	25	42	Leland Honeyman (R)	Young's Motorsports	Chevrolet	56	0	Accident	2
36	1	31	Parker Retzlaff	Jordan Anderson Racing	Chevrolet	53	20	Accident	1
37	33	35	Carson Ware	Joey Gase Motorsports	Chevrolet	44	0	Brakes	1
38	11	16	A. J. Allmendinger (P)	Kaulig Racing	Chevrolet	13	0	Accident	1
Official race results

== Standings after the race ==
Drivers' Championship standings

	Pos	Driver	Points
2	1	Austin Hill	4,000
2	2	A. J. Allmendinger	4,000 (–0)
1	3	Cole Custer	4,000 (–0)
3	4	Justin Allgaier	4,000 (–0)
	5	Chandler Smith	2,273 (–1,727)
3	6	Sheldon Creed	2,217 (–1,783)
1	7	Jesse Love	2,208 (–1,792)
2	8	Riley Herbst	2,194 (–1,806)
2	9	Sam Mayer	2,170 (–1,830)
1	10	Parker Kligerman	2,167 (–1,833)
3	11	Sammy Smith	2,163 (–1,837)
	12	Shane van Gisbergen	2,132 (–1,868)
Official driver's standings

Manufacturers' Championship standings

Pos	Manufacturer	Points
1	Chevrolet	1,193
2	Toyota	1,138 (–55)
3	Ford	1,032 (–161)

- Note: Only the first 12 positions are included for the driver standings.

Previous race: 2024 Credit One NASCAR Amex Credit Card 300	NASCAR Xfinity Series; 2024 season	Next race: 2024 NASCAR Xfinity Series Championship Race
