= 2023 Drive for the Cure 250 =

29th race of the 2023 NASCAR Xfinity Series

2023 Drive for the Cure 250 presented by BlueCross BlueShield of North Carolina
Race details
- Race 29 of 33 of the 2023 NASCAR Xfinity Series
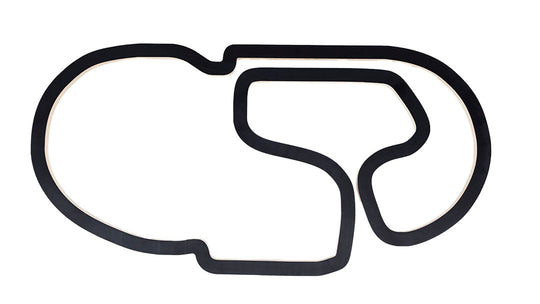
- Date: October 7, 2023
- Official name: 42nd Annual Drive for the Cure 250 presented by BlueCross BlueShield of North Carolina
- Location: Charlotte Motor Speedway, Concord, North Carolina
- Course: Permanent racing facility
- Course length: 2.28 miles (3.67 km)
- Distance: 67 laps, 155 mi (250 km)
- Scheduled distance: 67 laps, 155 mi (250 km)
- Average speed: 77.387 mph (124.542 km/h)

Pole position
Driver	Sam Mayer	JR Motorsports
- Time: 1:22.045

Most laps led
Driver	Sam Mayer	JR Motorsports
- Laps: 50

Winner
No. 1	Sam Mayer	JR Motorsports

Television in the United States
- Network: NBC
- Announcers: Rick Allen, Jeff Burton, Steve Letarte, and Dale Earnhardt Jr.

Radio in the United States
- Radio: PRN

The 2023 Drive for the Cure 250 presented by BlueCross BlueShield of North Carolina was the 29th stock car race of the 2023 NASCAR Xfinity Series, the final race of the Round of 12, and the 42nd iteration of the event. The race was held on Saturday, October 7, 2023, in Concord, North Carolina at the Charlotte Motor Speedway roval layout, a 2.28 miles (3.67 km) permanent road course. The race took the scheduled 67 laps to complete. Sam Mayer, driving for JR Motorsports, would put on a blistering performance, winning the pole and leading a race-high 50 laps, earning his third career NASCAR Xfinity Series win, and his third of the season. He would also earn a spot in the next round of the playoffs. To fill out the podium, Cole Custer, driving for Stewart-Haas Racing, and Josh Berry, driving for JR Motorsports, would finish 2nd and 3rd, respectively.

The eight drivers that would advance into the next round are John Hunter Nemechek, Austin Hill, Justin Allgaier, Sam Mayer, Cole Custer, Chandler Smith, Sheldon Creed, and Sammy Smith. Daniel Hemric, Parker Kligerman, Josh Berry, and Jeb Burton would be eliminated from championship contention.

== Background ==
Since 2018, deviating from past NASCAR events at Charlotte, the race will utilize a road course configuration of Charlotte Motor Speedway, promoted and trademarked as the "Roval". The course is 2.28 miles (3.67 km) in length and features 17 turns, utilizing the infield road course and portions of the oval track. The race will be contested over a scheduled distance of 109 laps, 400 kilometres (250 mi).

During July 2018 tests on the road course, concerns were raised over drivers "cheating" the backstretch chicane on the course. The chicanes were modified with additional tire barriers and rumble strips in order to encourage drivers to properly drive through them, and NASCAR will enforce drive-through penalties on drivers who illegally "short-cut" parts of the course. The chicanes will not be used during restarts. In the summer of 2019, the bus stop on the backstretch was changed and deepened, becoming a permanent part of the circuit, compared to the previous year where it was improvised.

If a driver fails to legally make the backstretch bus stop, the driver must skip the frontstretch chicane and make a complete stop by the dotted line on the exit before being allowed to continue. A driver who misses the frontstretch chicane must stop before the exit.

=== Entry list ===
- (R) denotes rookie driver.
- (i) denotes driver who is ineligible for series driver points.
- (P) denotes playoff driver.

#	Driver	Team	Make
00	Cole Custer (P)	Stewart-Haas Racing	Ford
1	Sam Mayer (P)	JR Motorsports	Chevrolet
02	Blaine Perkins (R)	Our Motorsports	Chevrolet
2	Sheldon Creed (P)	Richard Childress Racing	Chevrolet
4	Kyle Weatherman	JD Motorsports	Chevrolet
6	Brennan Poole	JD Motorsports	Chevrolet
07	Josh Bilicki	SS-Green Light Racing	Ford
7	Justin Allgaier (P)	JR Motorsports	Chevrolet
08	Stefan Parsons	SS-Green Light Racing	Chevrolet
8	Josh Berry (P)	JR Motorsports	Chevrolet
9	Brandon Jones	JR Motorsports	Chevrolet
10	Daniel Hemric (P)	Kaulig Racing	Chevrolet
11	Jordan Taylor	Kaulig Racing	Chevrolet
16	Chandler Smith (R) (P)	Kaulig Racing	Chevrolet
17	Boris Said	Hendrick Motorsports	Chevrolet
18	Sammy Smith (R) (P)	Joe Gibbs Racing	Toyota
19	Myatt Snider	Joe Gibbs Racing	Toyota
20	John Hunter Nemechek (P)	Joe Gibbs Racing	Toyota
21	Austin Hill (P)	Richard Childress Racing	Chevrolet
24	Connor Mosack (R)	Sam Hunt Racing	Toyota
25	Brett Moffitt	AM Racing	Ford
26	Kaz Grala	Sam Hunt Racing	Toyota
27	Jeb Burton (P)	Jordan Anderson Racing	Chevrolet
28	Kyle Sieg	RSS Racing	Ford
31	Parker Retzlaff (R)	Jordan Anderson Racing	Chevrolet
35	Alex Guenette	Emerling-Gase Motorsports	Toyota
38	Joe Graf Jr.	RSS Racing	Ford
39	Ryan Sieg	RSS Racing	Ford
43	Ryan Ellis	Alpha Prime Racing	Chevrolet
44	Rajah Caruth (i)	Alpha Prime Racing	Chevrolet
45	Leland Honeyman	Alpha Prime Racing	Chevrolet
48	Parker Kligerman (P)	Big Machine Racing	Chevrolet
50	Preston Pardus	Pardus Racing	Chevrolet
51	Jeremy Clements	Jeremy Clements Racing	Chevrolet
53	Conor Daly (i)	Emerling-Gase Motorsports	Chevrolet
66	Sage Karam	MBM Motorsports	Ford
74	Devin Jones	CHK Racing	Chevrolet
78	Anthony Alfredo	B. J. McLeod Motorsports	Chevrolet
87	Andy Lally (i)	Peterson Racing Group	Chevrolet
91	Alex Labbé	DGM Racing	Chevrolet
92	Josh Williams	DGM Racing	Chevrolet
98	Riley Herbst	Stewart-Haas Racing	Ford
Official entry list

== Practice ==
The first and only practice session was held on Saturday, October 7, at 10:00 AM CST, and would last for 20 minutes. Justin Allgaier, driving for JR Motorsports, would set the fastest time in the session, with a lap of 1:23.043, and an average speed of 100.574 mph (161.858 km/h).

Pos.	#	Driver	Team	Make	Time	Speed
1	7	Justin Allgaier (P)	JR Motorsports	Chevrolet	1:23.043	100.574
2	91	Alex Labbé	DGM Racing	Chevrolet	1:23.263	100.309
3	26	Kaz Grala	Sam Hunt Racing	Toyota	1:23.275	100.294
Full practice results

== Qualifying ==
Qualifying was held on Saturday, October 7, at 10:30 AM CST. Since the Charlotte Motor Speedway roval layout is a road course, the qualifying system is a two group system, with two rounds. Drivers will be separated into two groups, Group A and Group B. Each driver will have multiple laps to set a time. The fastest 5 drivers from each group will advance to the final round. The fastest driver to set a time in the final round will win the pole.

The final round of qualifying was cancelled due to the cleanup of fluid on the track from Boris Said's car. Sam Mayer, driving for JR Motorsports, would score the pole for the race, with a lap of 1:22.045, and an average speed of 101.798 mph (163.828 km/h) in the first round. Andy Lally, Preston Pardus, Boris Said, and Devin Jones would fail to qualify.

Pos.	#	Driver	Team	Make	Time	Speed
1	1	Sam Mayer (P)	JR Motorsports	Chevrolet	1:22.045	101.798
2	7	Justin Allgaier (P)	JR Motorsports	Chevrolet	1:22.083	101.751
3	8	Josh Berry (P)	JR Motorsports	Chevrolet	1:22.509	101.225
4	10	Daniel Hemric (P)	Kaulig Racing	Chevrolet	1:22.548	101.177
5	2	Sheldon Creed (P)	Richard Childress Racing	Chevrolet	1:22.645	101.059
6	48	Parker Kligerman (P)	Big Machine Racing	Chevrolet	1:22.698	100.994
7	00	Cole Custer (P)	Stewart-Haas Racing	Ford	1:22.743	100.939
8	21	Austin Hill (P)	Richard Childress Racing	Chevrolet	1:22.794	100.877
9	98	Riley Herbst	Stewart-Haas Racing	Ford	1:22.828	100.835
10	91	Alex Labbé	DGM Racing	Chevrolet	1:22.939	100.701
11	9	Brandon Jones	JR Motorsports	Chevrolet	1:23.080	100.530
12	11	Jordan Taylor	Kaulig Racing	Chevrolet	1:23.135	100.463
13	4	Kyle Weatherman	JD Motorsports	Chevrolet	1:23.223	100.357
14	26	Kaz Grala	Sam Hunt Racing	Toyota	1:23.249	100.326
15	51	Jeremy Clements	Jeremy Clements Racing	Chevrolet	1:23.333	100.224
16	24	Connor Mosack (R)	Sam Hunt Racing	Toyota	1:23.340	100.216
17	16	Chandler Smith (R) (P)	Kaulig Racing	Chevrolet	1:23.384	100.163
18	07	Josh Bilicki	SS-Green Light Racing	Ford	1:23.426	100.113
19	27	Jeb Burton (P)	Jordan Anderson Racing	Chevrolet	1:23.456	100.077
20	66	Sage Karam	MBM Motorsports	Ford	1:23.611	99.891
21	78	Anthony Alfredo	B. J. McLeod Motorsports	Chevrolet	1:23.622	99.878
22	18	Sammy Smith (R) (P)	Joe Gibbs Racing	Toyota	1:23.652	99.842
23	31	Parker Retzlaff (R)	Jordan Anderson Racing	Chevrolet	1:23.672	99.818
24	02	Blaine Perkins (R)	Our Motorsports	Chevrolet	1:23.741	99.736
25	39	Ryan Sieg	RSS Racing	Ford	1:23.752	99.723
26	45	Leland Honeyman	Alpha Prime Racing	Chevrolet	1:23.775	99.696
27	25	Brett Moffitt	AM Racing	Ford	1:23.786	99.683
28	44	Rajah Caruth (i)	Alpha Prime Racing	Chevrolet	1:23.819	99.643
29	08	Stefan Parsons	SS-Green Light Racing	Chevrolet	1:23.849	99.608
30	43	Ryan Ellis	Alpha Prime Racing	Chevrolet	1:23.894	99.554
31	19	Myatt Snider	Joe Gibbs Racing	Toyota	1:24.016	99.410
32	6	Brennan Poole	JD Motorsports	Chevrolet	1:24.222	99.166
33	92	Josh Williams	DGM Racing	Chevrolet	1:24.285	99.092
Qualified by owner's points
34	53	Conor Daly (i)	Emerling-Gase Motorsports	Chevrolet	1:24.649	98.666
35	38	Joe Graf Jr.	RSS Racing	Ford	1:24.652	98.663
36	28	Kyle Sieg	RSS Racing	Ford	1:25.579	97.594
37	35	Alex Guenette	Emerling-Gase Motorsports	Toyota	1:25.920	97.207
38	20	John Hunter Nemechek (P)	Joe Gibbs Racing	Toyota	–	–
Failed to qualify
39	87	Andy Lally (i)	Peterson Racing Group	Chevrolet	1:24.369	98.994
40	50	Preston Pardus	Pardus Racing	Chevrolet	1:24.685	98.624
41	17	Boris Said	Hendrick Motorsports	Chevrolet	1:26.296	96.783
42	74	Devin Jones	CHK Racing	Chevrolet	1:33.471	89.354
Official qualifying results
Official starting lineup

== Race results ==
Stage 1 Laps: 20

Pos.	#	Driver	Team	Make	Pts
1	7	Justin Allgaier (P)	JR Motorsports	Chevrolet	10
2	10	Daniel Hemric (P)	Kaulig Racing	Chevrolet	9
3	2	Sheldon Creed (P)	Richard Childress Racing	Chevrolet	8
4	48	Parker Kligerman (P)	Big Machine Racing	Chevrolet	7
5	21	Austin Hill (P)	Richard Childress Racing	Chevrolet	6
6	16	Chandler Smith (R) (P)	Kaulig Racing	Chevrolet	5
7	18	Sammy Smith (R) (P)	Joe Gibbs Racing	Toyota	4
8	1	Sam Mayer (P)	JR Motorsports	Chevrolet	3
9	27	Jeb Burton (P)	Jordan Anderson Racing	Chevrolet	2
10	07	Josh Bilicki	SS-Green Light Racing	Ford	1

Stage 2 Laps: 20

Pos.	#	Driver	Team	Make	Pts
1	20	John Hunter Nemechek (P)	Joe Gibbs Racing	Toyota	10
2	10	Daniel Hemric (P)	Kaulig Racing	Chevrolet	9
3	48	Parker Kligerman (P)	Big Machine Racing	Chevrolet	8
4	2	Sheldon Creed (P)	Richard Childress Racing	Chevrolet	7
5	91	Alex Labbé	DGM Racing	Chevrolet	6
6	18	Sammy Smith (R) (P)	Joe Gibbs Racing	Toyota	5
7	1	Sam Mayer (P)	JR Motorsports	Chevrolet	4
8	16	Chandler Smith (R) (P)	Kaulig Racing	Chevrolet	3
9	07	Josh Bilicki	SS-Green Light Racing	Ford	2
10	08	Stefan Parsons	SS-Green Light Racing	Chevrolet	1

Stage 3 Laps: 27

Pos.	St	#	Driver	Team	Make	Laps	Led	Status	Pts
1	1	1	Sam Mayer (P)	JR Motorsports	Chevrolet	67	50	Running	47
2	7	00	Cole Custer (P)	Stewart-Haas Racing	Ford	67	4	Running	35
3	3	8	Josh Berry (P)	JR Motorsports	Chevrolet	67	0	Running	34
4	9	98	Riley Herbst	Stewart-Haas Racing	Ford	67	0	Running	33
5	14	26	Kaz Grala	Sam Hunt Racing	Toyota	67	0	Running	32
6	6	48	Parker Kligerman (P)	Big Machine Racing	Chevrolet	67	0	Running	46
7	4	10	Daniel Hemric (P)	Kaulig Racing	Chevrolet	67	0	Running	48
8	38	20	John Hunter Nemechek (P)	Joe Gibbs Racing	Toyota	67	2	Running	39
9	8	21	Austin Hill (P)	Richard Childress Racing	Chevrolet	67	0	Running	34
10	5	2	Sheldon Creed (P)	Richard Childress Racing	Chevrolet	67	0	Running	42
11	22	18	Sammy Smith (R) (P)	Joe Gibbs Racing	Toyota	67	0	Running	35
12	17	16	Chandler Smith (R) (P)	Kaulig Racing	Chevrolet	67	0	Running	33
13	25	39	Ryan Sieg	RSS Racing	Ford	67	0	Running	24
14	31	19	Myatt Snider	Joe Gibbs Racing	Toyota	67	0	Running	23
15	10	91	Alex Labbé	DGM Racing	Chevrolet	67	0	Running	28
16	12	11	Jordan Taylor	Kaulig Racing	Chevrolet	67	0	Running	21
17	32	6	Brennan Poole	JD Motorsports	Chevrolet	67	0	Running	20
18	29	08	Stefan Parsons	SS-Green Light Racing	Chevrolet	67	0	Running	20
19	28	44	Rajah Caruth (i)	Alpha Prime Racing	Chevrolet	67	0	Running	0
20	33	92	Josh Williams	DGM Racing	Chevrolet	67	0	Running	17
21	26	45	Leland Honeyman	Alpha Prime Racing	Chevrolet	67	0	Running	16
22	23	31	Parker Retzlaff (R)	Jordan Anderson Racing	Chevrolet	67	0	Running	15
23	15	51	Jeremy Clements	Jeremy Clements Racing	Chevrolet	67	0	Running	14
24	16	24	Connor Mosack (R)	Sam Hunt Racing	Toyota	67	0	Running	13
25	18	07	Josh Bilicki	SS-Green Light Racing	Ford	67	0	Running	15
26	13	4	Kyle Weatherman	JD Motorsports	Chevrolet	67	0	Running	11
27	20	66	Sage Karam	MBM Motorsports	Ford	67	0	Running	10
28	24	02	Blaine Perkins (R)	Our Motorsports	Chevrolet	67	0	Running	9
29	11	9	Brandon Jones	JR Motorsports	Chevrolet	67	0	Running	8
30	21	78	Anthony Alfredo	B. J. McLeod Motorsports	Chevrolet	67	0	Running	7
31	35	38	Joe Graf Jr.	RSS Racing	Ford	67	0	Running	6
32	36	28	Kyle Sieg	RSS Racing	Ford	67	0	Running	5
33	37	35	Alex Guenette	Emerling-Gase Motorsports	Toyota	67	0	Running	4
34	19	27	Jeb Burton (P)	Jordan Anderson Racing	Chevrolet	66	1	Running	5
35	34	53	Conor Daly (i)	Emerling-Gase Motorsports	Chevrolet	66	0	Running	0
36	30	43	Ryan Ellis	Alpha Prime Racing	Chevrolet	63	0	Accident	1
37	2	7	Justin Allgaier (P)	JR Motorsports	Chevrolet	60	10	Accident	11
38	27	25	Brett Moffitt	AM Racing	Ford	40	0	Ignition	1
Official race results

== Standings after the race ==
Drivers' Championship standings

	Pos	Driver	Points
	1	John Hunter Nemechek	3,055
2	2	Austin Hill	3,039 (-16)
1	3	Justin Allgaier	3,035 (–20)
8	4	Sam Mayer	3,020 (–35)
2	5	Cole Custer	3,018 (–37)
1	6	Chandler Smith	3,009 (–46)
	7	Sheldon Creed	3,008 (–47)
2	8	Sammy Smith	3,006 (–49)
1	9	Daniel Hemric	2,103 (–952)
1	10	Parker Kligerman	2,100 (–955)
	11	Josh Berry	2,062 (–993)
2	12	Jeb Burton	2,041 (–1,014)
Official driver's standings

- Note: Only the first 12 positions are included for the driver standings.

Previous race: 2023 Andy's Frozen Custard 300	NASCAR Xfinity Series; 2023 season	Next race: 2023 Alsco Uniforms 302
