= Van Gisbergen =

Van Gisbergen is a Dutch surname. Notable people with the surname include:

- Mark Van Gisbergen (born 1977), New Zealand-born rugby union player
- Shane Van Gisbergen (born 1989), New Zealand racecar driver
