= Ross Chastain =

American racing driver (born 1992)

- Chastain at Las Vegas Motor Speedway in 2026
- Born: Ross Lee Chastain; December 4, 1992 (age 33); Alva, Florida, U.S.
- Achievements: As Driver: 2025 Coca-Cola 600 Winner; 2022 GEICO 500 Winner; 2011 World Series Of Asphalt Limited Late Model Champion; Records: 14th driver in history to win a NASCAR race in all 3 national series at the same track (Charlotte)
- Awards: 2019 NASCAR Gander Outdoors Truck Series Most Popular Driver

NASCAR Cup Series career
- 295 races run over 10 years
- Car no., team: No. 1 (Trackhouse Racing)
- 2026 position: 18th
- Best finish: 2nd (2022)
- First race: 2017 AAA 400 Drive for Autism (Dover)
- Last race: 2026 Season Finale 400 (Homestead)
- First win: 2022 EchoPark Texas Grand Prix (Austin)
- Last win: 2025 Coca-Cola 600 (Charlotte)
Wins	Top tens	Poles
6	78	3

NASCAR O'Reilly Auto Parts Series career
- 223 races run over 13 years
- Car no., team: No. 9 (JR Motorsports)
- 2026 position: 71st
- Best finish: 7th (2020)
- First race: 2014 History 300 (Charlotte)
- Last race: 2026 Hy-Vee PERKS 250 (Iowa)
- First win: 2018 DC Solar 300 (Las Vegas)
- Last win: 2026 Charbroil 300 (Charlotte)
Wins	Top tens	Poles
3	64	2

NASCAR FedEx Freight Truck Series career
- 125 races run over 15 years
- 2026 position: 98th
- Best finish: 2nd (2019)
- First race: 2011 AAA Insurance 200 (IRP)
- Last race: 2026 DQS Solutions & Staffing 250 (Michigan)
- First win: 2019 Digital Ally 250 (Kansas)
- Last win: 2024 Buckle Up South Carolina 200 (Darlington)
Wins	Top tens	Poles
5	56	4

ARCA Menards Series East career
- 2 races run over 1 year
- Best finish: 39th (2014)
- First race: 2014 JEGS 150 (Columbus)
- Last race: 2014 Autolite Iridium XP 150 (Iowa)
Wins	Top tens	Poles
0	1	0
- Statistics up to date as of November 8, 2026.

Ross Lee Chastain (born December 4, 1992) is an American professional stock car racing driver. He competes full-time in the NASCAR Cup Series, driving the No. 1 Chevrolet Camaro ZL1 for Trackhouse Racing, and part-time in the NASCAR O'Reilly Auto Parts Series, driving the No. 9 Chevrolet Camaro SS for JR Motorsports. He is the older brother of former fellow NASCAR driver Chad Chastain.

== Early career ==
Chastain started racing at the age of twelve, and his interest was piqued by his father's hobby of racing and other kids his age racing. His home track was Punta Gorda Speedway in Punta Gorda, Florida, at age twelve, competing in both late model and Fastruck Series events. Even those races, at tracks like Citrus County Speedway, Auburndale Speedway and DeSoto Speedway, were run on a tight budget, a theme that carried on to much of Chastain's career in the higher ranks of NASCAR. His short track career saw Chastain scoring over fifty wins in feature events, including the Limited Late Model portion of the 2011 World Series Of Asphalt Stock Car Racing at New Smyrna Speedway, winning three of eight events in the series.

== NASCAR ==
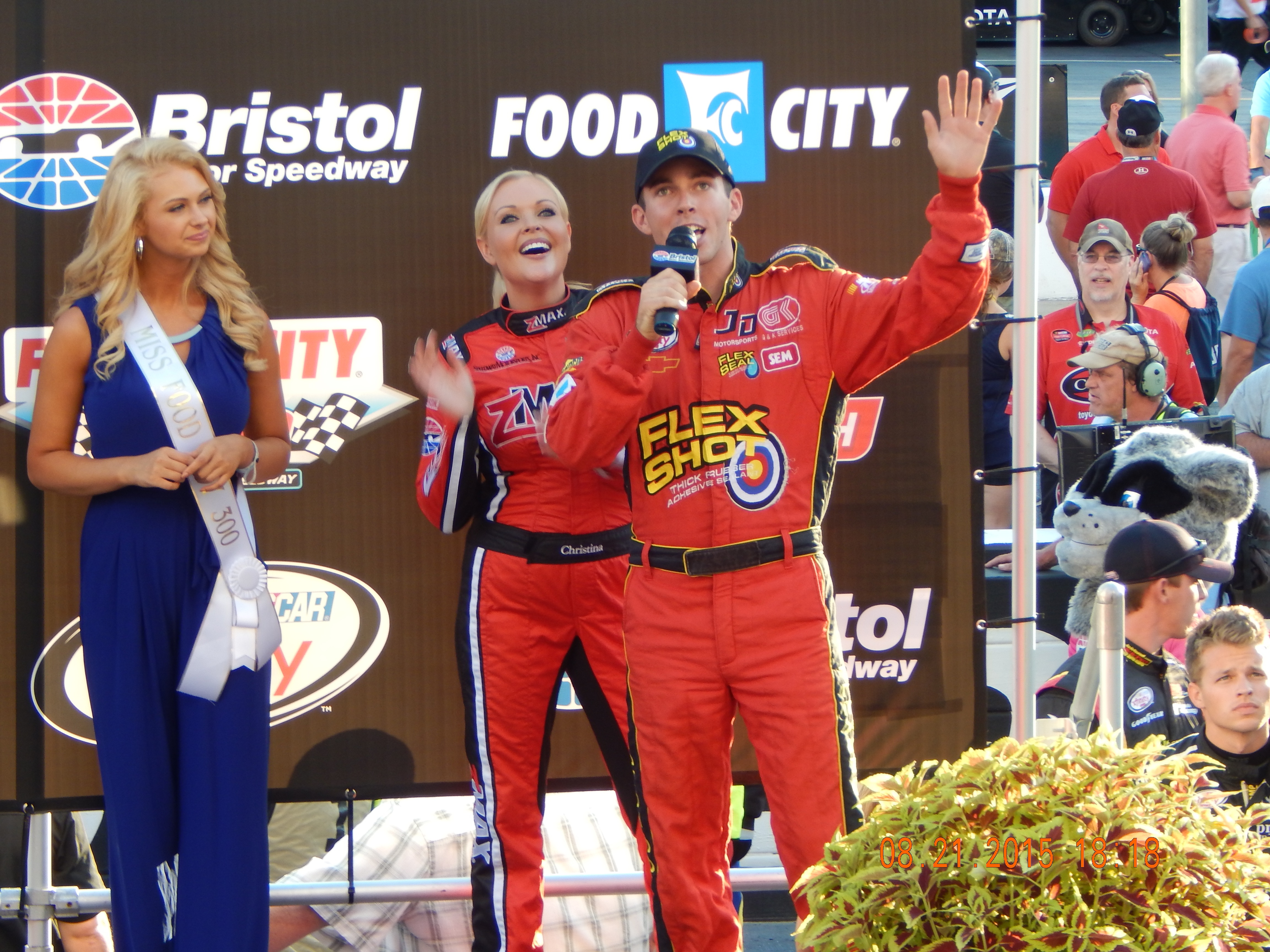
Chastain at Bristol Motor Speedway in 2015

After making the move to Charlotte in mid-2011, Chastain took over the No. 66 Turn One Racing entry in the NASCAR Camping World Truck Series after Justin Marks vacated the seat. His first Truck race, at Lucas Oil Raceway at Indianapolis, was his first race with live pit stops. He finished tenth in that event. Connections in the watermelon farming industry got Chastain four more races, which were marred by incidents at Bristol Motor Speedway and Kentucky Speedway. At Homestead-Miami Speedway, rain prevented the Turn One team from making the race, so the team bought an RSS Racing start and park entry and ran the full race, finishing two laps down. It was later announced that Chastain would compete for Rookie of the Year honors with SS-Green Light Racing in 2012. Driving the No. 08 truck sponsored by the National Watermelon Association and National Watermelon Promotion Board, he scored a career-best finish of seventh in the second race of the season at Martinsville Speedway. He bested his seventh-place finish with a third-place finish at Bristol in August.

In January 2013, it was announced that Chastain would drive in fifteen Camping World Truck Series races in 2013 for Brad Keselowski Racing. At Iowa Speedway in September, Chastain won his first career Truck Series pole for the Fan Appreciation 200; he led the most laps in the race, finishing second to James Buescher as the race underwent a green–white–checkered finish. Chastain also came close to the win at the penultimate race at Phoenix, finishing second to Erik Jones after leading over sixty laps. Years later, Chastain said that he initially made the move to BKR as an attempt to get in a Team Penske ride, but that BKR and Penske did not view the situation that way.

=== 2014–2016 ===
Leaving BKR after the 2013 season, Chastain moved to RBR Enterprises for a part-time schedule in the NASCAR Camping World Truck Series for 2014. Comments before and after the Martinsville race, as well as racing actions during the race, led the team to fire Chastain from the ride. In May, he made his debut in the Nationwide Series (now The O’Reilly Auto Parts Series) at Charlotte Motor Speedway, driving the No. 55 for Viva Motorsports. Chastain later drove for Hattori Racing Enterprises at Michigan International Speedway, replacing Johnny Sauter. If that opportunity did not arise, Chastain was set to replace another driver that weekend, John Wes Townley in the No. 5 Wauters Motorsports truck at Gateway Motorsports Park. In the race with HRE, Chastain finished twelfth, which was to that point the team's best finish in NASCAR competition. The finish eventually turned into more sporadic appearances with HRE throughout the rest of the season. Chastain also joined the team for a part-time NASCAR K&N Pro Series East effort that year.

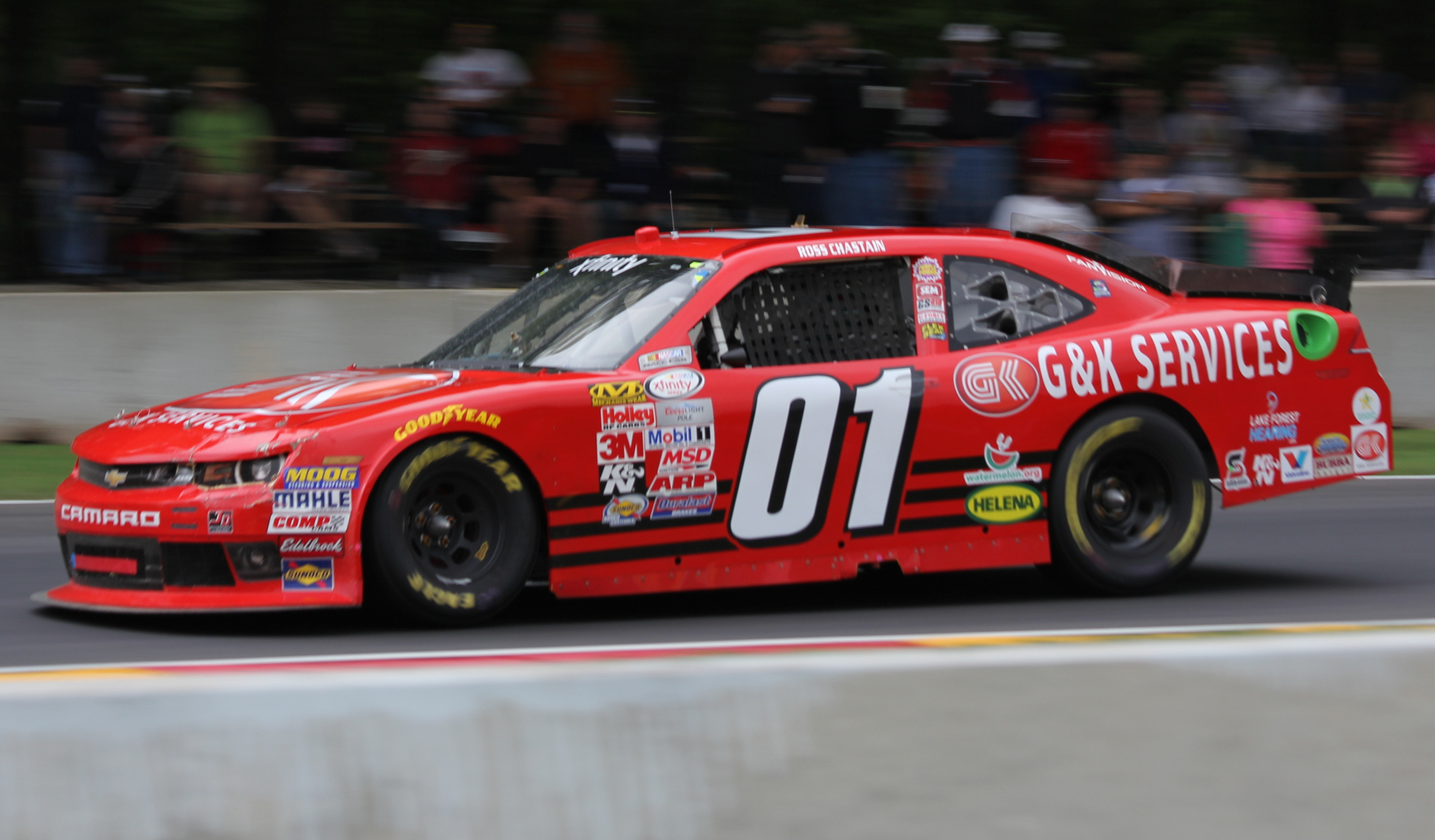
2015 Xfinity Series car at Road America

He then joined JD Motorsports in 2015, replacing Jeffrey Earnhardt. The opportunity emerged after Chastain raced with TriStar Motorsports at the end of the 2014 season. His car was comparable to the performance of the JDM cars, which led to a deal in the offseason. Chastain logged four top-tens on the year, ninth in the season-opening PowerShares QQQ 300, tenth at the other Daytona race, tenth at Iowa, and tenth at Darlington, and got into an altercation with Ryan Reed after a race at Richmond International Raceway. Reed claimed Chastain made too much contact on late restarts and vowed payback, while Chastain simply brushed the incident off as a difference of opinion in short-track racing.

=== 2017 ===
Chastain's 2017 Xfinity season was the best of his career, scoring a top-five at Iowa and two top tens as well as finishing thirteenth in points, the highest of the non-playoff drivers. He achieved this after a tight points battle with J. J. Yeley for the spot in the last four races of the season. In the second half of the season, Chastain rarely finished outside the top twenty and mainly finished in the mid-teens.

The season was marred by two fights with fellow Xfinity drivers, one with Jeremy Clements at Bristol after Clements confronted him and one with Brendan Gaughan at Texas after heated on-track competition. Chastain, Gaughan, and crew members from both teams brawled behind Victory Lane after the night race. A crew member from JD Motorsports, teammate Garrett Smithley, was taken to the hospital with a head injury after the fight. Chastain blamed the confrontation on Gaughan, saying the Richard Childress Racing driver attacked him, but also acknowledged that he races hard and does not play favorites. Gaughan initially avoided discussing the incident with reporters but later boasted about the incident on SiriusXM NASCAR Radio and said that he received several text messages from fellow drivers who were happy about the incident. He did admit that he could've handled the situation later, but didn't care about it. That opinion was likely influenced by the fact that 2017 was Gaughan's final Xfinity season, as any retaliation had to happen within the next two races.

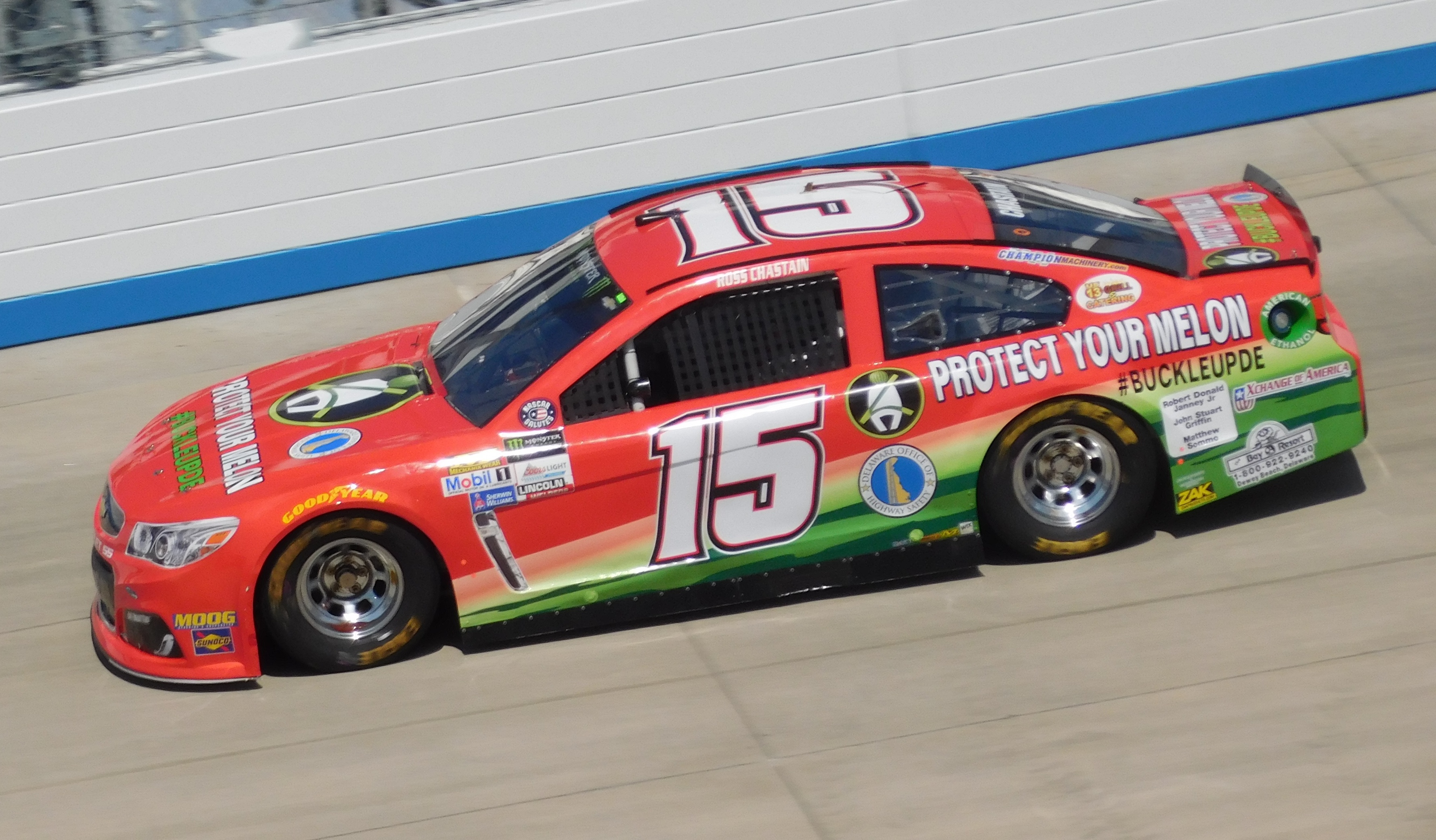
Chastain during his Cup Series debut at Dover International Speedway in 2017

In 2017, Chastain joined Premium Motorsports' No. 15 car for his Monster Energy NASCAR Cup Series debut in the AAA 400 Drive for Autism at Dover, an opportunity he initially resisted after being informed of the opportunity by Xfinity team owner Johnny Davis. he finished twentieth. Chastain heard from various sources that his driving style made multiple drivers mad on-track, but Chastain says it doesn't bother him. He also drove the No. 15 at the fall Dover race, finishing 38th. Chastain was originally on the entry list to drive the No. 7 car, the second car for Premium Motorsports, at the Cup series season finale at Homestead, but the team withdrew.

=== 2018 ===
In late September 2017, Chastain announced that he would return to JD Motorsports for a fourth year, running the entire 2018 NASCAR Xfinity Series season, as well as hinting at another part-time Cup schedule with Premium Motorsports. He started off the Xfinity season with a top-ten at Daytona International Speedway, and ran his first Cup race of 2018 the week after at Atlanta Motor Speedway. By the Easter off weekend, Chastain had expanded his Cup schedule, which had included every race since Atlanta, to all of the race weekends where the Monster Energy NASCAR Cup Series and NASCAR Xfinity Series run at the same track. Chastain also returned to the truck series at Iowa on an off week for the Cup Series and a companion race with the Xfinity Series, driving the No. 50 truck for Beaver Motorsports. He continued to run most of the Cup schedule, running the entirety of the summer schedule save for the Sonoma Raceway event, where Justin Marks drove. Chastain tied his career-best Xfinity Series finish at Iowa Speedway, avoiding last-lap chaos to bring home another fourth-place finish. At the Xfinity Series race at Mid-Ohio, Chastain and Joey Gase made contact multiple times on the final lap, eventually leading Gase to spin off track. On pit road after the race, Gase swerved his car toward Chastain with spectators and crew members in the vicinity. The two later had a shouting match, and Gase was tackled by one of Chastain's crew members. After a trip to the NASCAR hauler, Gase called Chastain a "golden boy" and threatened to derail Chastain's playoff hopes. Chastain hopped in the Premium Motorsports No. 15 truck for the World of Westgate 200 and finished seventh, Premium's best-ever finish across all three NASCAR national series.

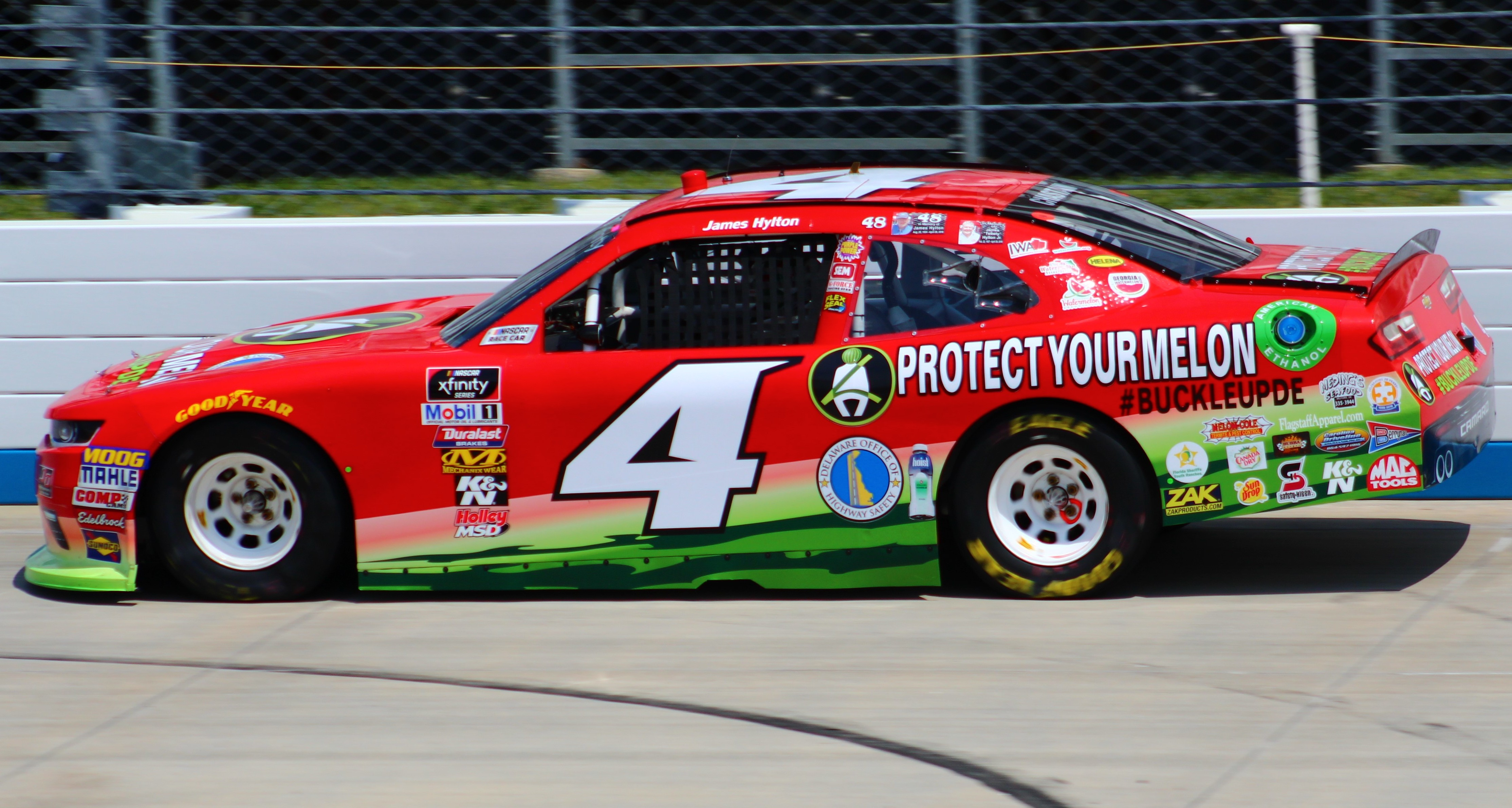
Chastain's No. 4 car at Dover in 2018

On the strength of a summer performance that saw him hold down the final Xfinity Series playoff spot, Chastain and Chip Ganassi Racing announced a three-race agreement for Chastain to pilot the organization's No. 42 entry for races at Darlington Raceway, Las Vegas Motor Speedway and Richmond Raceway. The races came at the expense of John Hunter Nemechek, who could not sell sponsorship for the races. DC Solar was announced as a backer for Chastain's effort. Chastain had previously met the CEO of DC Solar at Auto Club Speedway in 2018, and plans materialized from there. For the first race of the trio, Chastain held top-ten spots in both practices, finishing second in first practice. He later claimed the pole over Christopher Bell, and during the race won the first two stages. During the third stage, Chastain was battling for the race lead with Kevin Harvick with thirty-five laps to go. Through turns one and two of the traditionally one-groove Darlington track, the lapped car of Chad Finchum took the top-groove racing lane, leaving Harvick and Chastain jostling for positions in the bottom lanes. After clearing Finchum, Harvick slid up into Chastain, who then slid up into the wall. On the backstretch, Chastain hooked Harvick's machine into the outside wall, ending Harvick's day. Harvick later parked in Chastain's pit stall before giving a heated post-race interview calling Chastain "inexperienced" and saying that Chastain will "never get to drive many of them [events in top-tier cars] again. Chip Ganassi then responded on Twitter, defending Chastain's performance and stating that he "helped himself to many future opportunities"." Chastain, for his part, finished 25th after repairs and called running up front "cool" and also saying "I don't care what Harvick says."

"No matter what happens, if I go back to the farm tomorrow ... which I'm going to do one day after racing's over, if I had to back tomorrow I'll have no regrets, obviously."

— Chastain in a TV interview after the race

After running a race with JD Motorsports at Indianapolis, Chastain returned to CGR for the DC Solar 300 at Las Vegas Motor Speedway. He once again performed well throughout the weekend, securing the second-fastest time in final practice and the fifth starting spot for the race. Once again the class of the field, Chastain led all but twenty of the 200 laps in the race and prevailed over Justin Allgaier for the victory, his first in over 200 starts in NASCAR. True to his roots, Chastain smashed a watermelon on the track as a final victory celebration. In a post-race media conference, he admitted to getting emotional in the closing laps of the race due to the gravity of the win. With the win, a playoff berth was wrapped up, the first of his career. Chastain also revealed that he was not being paid to drive the car, something that he claimed was reason for ridicule within the sport. Chastain fell out of the playoffs after the opening round after Matt Tifft made a late-race rally at Dover, claiming the final spot by three points.

Towards the latter part of the 2018 season, Chastain joined Niece Motorsports for some NASCAR Camping World Truck Series races. Although some were surprised at how well Chastain ran in those races, Chastain instead said that the organization was better than the community gave it credit for.

=== 2019 ===
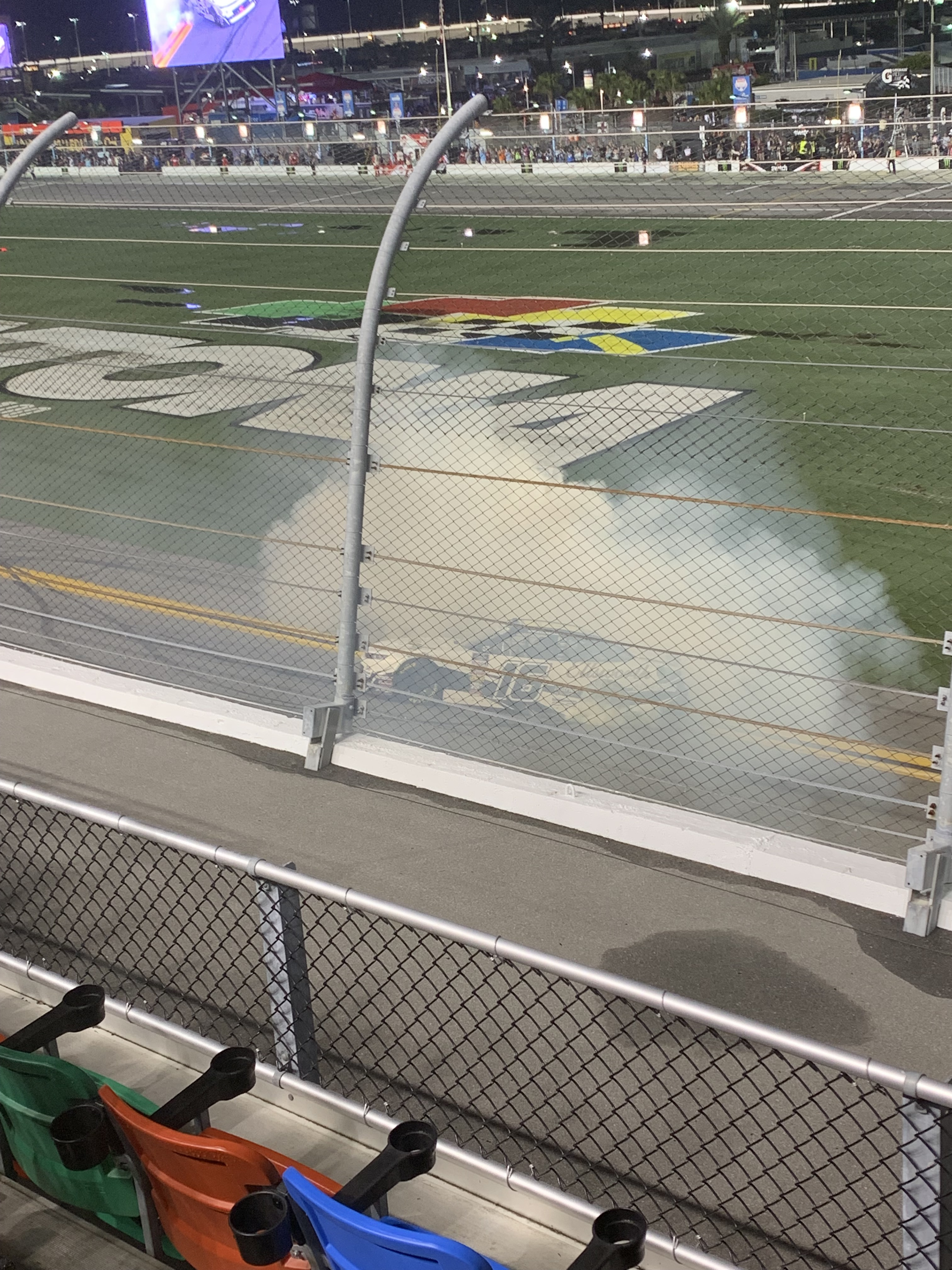
Chastain performing his victory burnout after winning the 2019 Circle K Firecracker 250 at Daytona

On October 6, 2018, it was reported that Chastain had agreed to drive the 2019 Monster Energy NASCAR Cup Series season with Premium Motorsports, and a deal with Chip Ganassi Racing for more Xfinity races was likely. On November 9, 2018, Chastain and CGR announced a full season in the No. 42 Xfinity Series car for 2019. DC Solar, instrumental in Chastain's introduction to the team, remained on as sponsor. However, after DC Solar was raided by the FBI on December 18, 2018, the team lost the sponsorship and shut down in January.

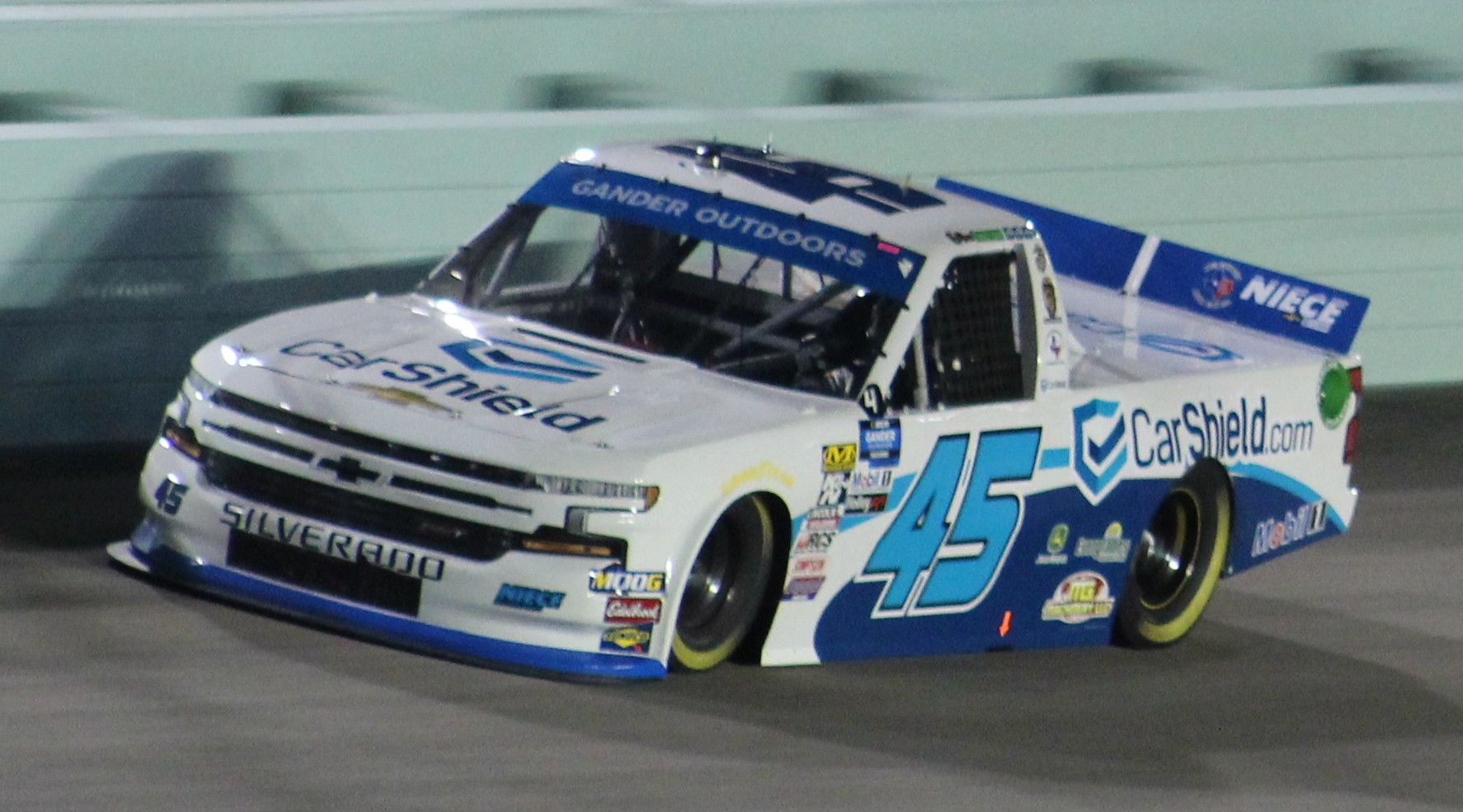
Chastain's No. 45 truck at Homestead–Miami Speedway in 2019

In January 2019, Chastain joined Niece Motorsports to drive the No. 45 Silverado part-time in the Truck Series, splitting the truck with Reid Wilson. On January 31, Chastain announced his return to the No. 4 JD Motorsports ride for 30 races, replacing Blake Koch, who stepped away to focus on business ventures. For the other three races of the schedule – Daytona in February, Chicagoland in June, and Texas in November – Chastain announced he would join Kaulig Racing, driving the organization's No. 10 entry. In his first race with Niece, Chastain began the season with a third-place finish in the 2019 NextEra Energy 250. At his first ever Daytona 500, Chastain scored his first career top-ten in the Cup Series with a tenth-place finish despite starting 36th in the race.

During the spring, Chastain broke the all-time NASCAR record for most consecutive races run across all three national series to start a season through the Xfinity race in the 2019 LTi Printing 250 at Michigan International Speedway totaling 36, surpassing the mark of 22 set by Kyle Busch set in 2008.

On May 10, 2019, Chastain won his first career NASCAR Gander Outdoors Truck Series race in the 2019 Digital Ally 250 at Kansas Speedway. He nearly spun out with twenty laps to go but saved the truck, later inheriting the lead from Stewart Friesen after he ran out of fuel. In June, he announced his intention to switch to Truck Series points to compete for a championship in the series.

In June's M&M's 200 at Iowa, Chastain led 141 of 200 laps and swept the stages to score the win, but his truck failed post-race inspection and his victory was forfeited to Brett Moffitt under NASCAR's newly introduced disqualification policy. Chastain was the first driver to have a win revoked since Dale Jarrett was disqualified from a Busch Series race in 1995, relegated to last in the official standings. Chastain's team appealed the penalty, though it was eventually upheld after a hearing with National Motorsports Appeals panelist Bryan Moss. He earned redemption the following week in Gateway's CarShield 200, however, leading 21 laps and scoring the victory after taking only fuel and no tires on his final pit stop.

Chastain won the 2019 Circle K Firecracker 250 at Daytona, driving the No. 16 Camaro for Kaulig Racing. Chastain's teammates Justin Haley and A. J. Allmendinger finished behind him, though Allmendinger was subsequently disqualified for failing post-race inspection. Chastain later won at Pocono Raceway in the Truck Series in commanding fashion, dedicating his win to Kaulig crew chief Nick Harrison, who had died the previous week. In Xfinity Series competition at Watkins Glen International, Chastain sent Justin Allgaier spinning off the track in the bus stop portion of the circuit; Allgaier, thinking the move was intentional, wrecked Chastain in the same section of the track later in the race, relegating Chastain to a 34th-place finish. Chastain chalked his side of the incidents up to mistakes while Allgaier cited instances of Daytona earlier in 2018 and Las Vegas in 2018 as further dirty racing by Chastain. Once Chastain's berth in the Truck Series playoffs was secure, CarShield announced full sponsorship of his playoff efforts.

Chastain earned his second top-five of 2019 when he finished second to Christopher Bell at Texas Motor Speedway in November, leading 29 laps.

=== 2020 ===
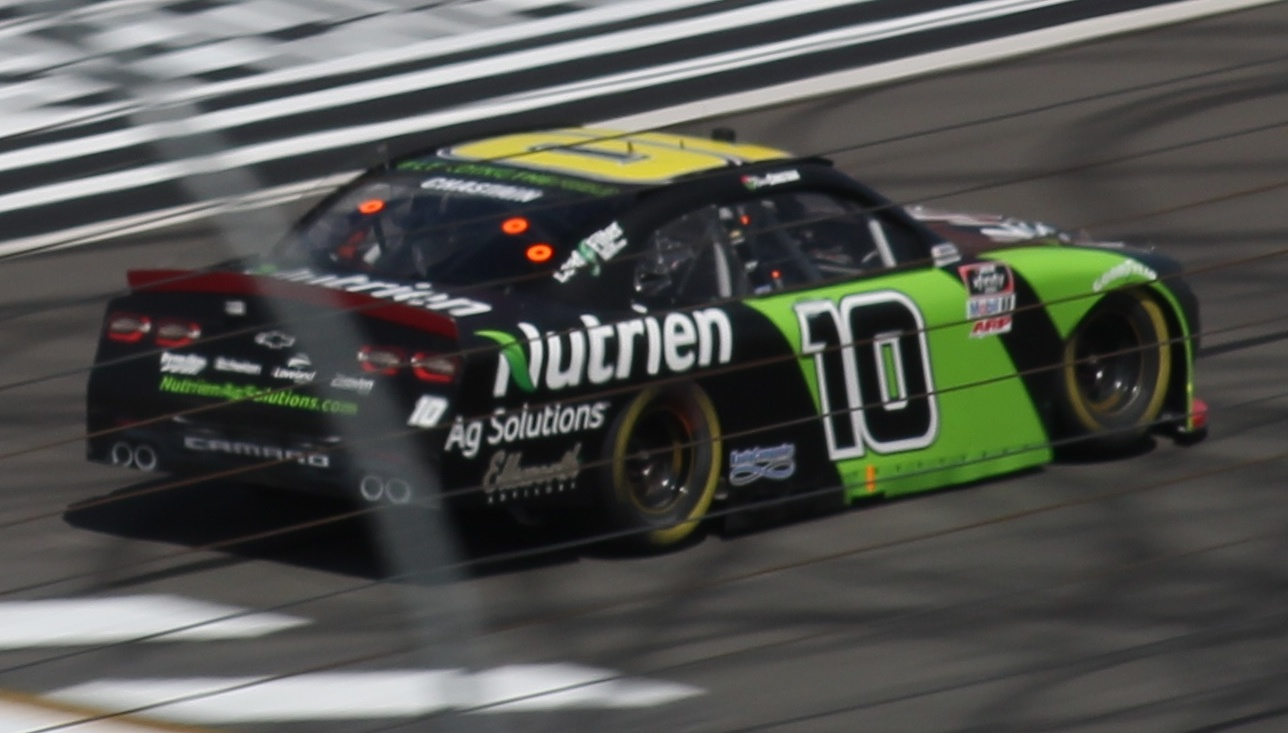
Chastain's 2020 Xfinity Series car

On October 15, 2019, it was announced that Chastain would be driving for Kaulig Racing full-time in the 2020 NASCAR Xfinity Series. Chastain also returned to the Cup Series at the Daytona 500 and Coca-Cola 600, driving the No. 77 in a partnership between Chip Ganassi Racing and Spire Motorsports. He also retained his ride with Niece Motorsports in the Truck Series in a part-time capacity, moving over to the organization's No. 44 entry and sharing the ride with Carson Hocevar and Natalie Decker.

Chastain failed to qualify for the Xfinity season opener at Daytona after mechanical issues plagued his car. However, Kaulig and RSS Racing forged an agreement that RSS driver Jeff Green would surrender his No. 38 car to Chastain for the race. In the Daytona 500, Chastain was involved in a late wreck with Ryan Preece that took him out of the race.

On February 19, 2020, Roush Fenway Racing announced Chastain as the replacement driver for an injured Ryan Newman in the team's No. 6 Ford starting with the Pennzoil 400 at Las Vegas. Chastain drove the No. 6 for three races before the season was put on hold due to the COVID-19 pandemic. Newman returned to the No. 6 when the season resumed, while Chastain returned to Spire Motorsports part-time.

On September 21, 2020, Chip Ganassi Racing named Chastain as the driver of the No. 42 Chevrolet in 2021, replacing Matt Kenseth. He finished a career-high seventh in the Xfinity standings with 27 top-tens (the most of any driver that season) and fifteen top-fives (including five runner-up finishes), despite not winning a race.

=== 2021 ===
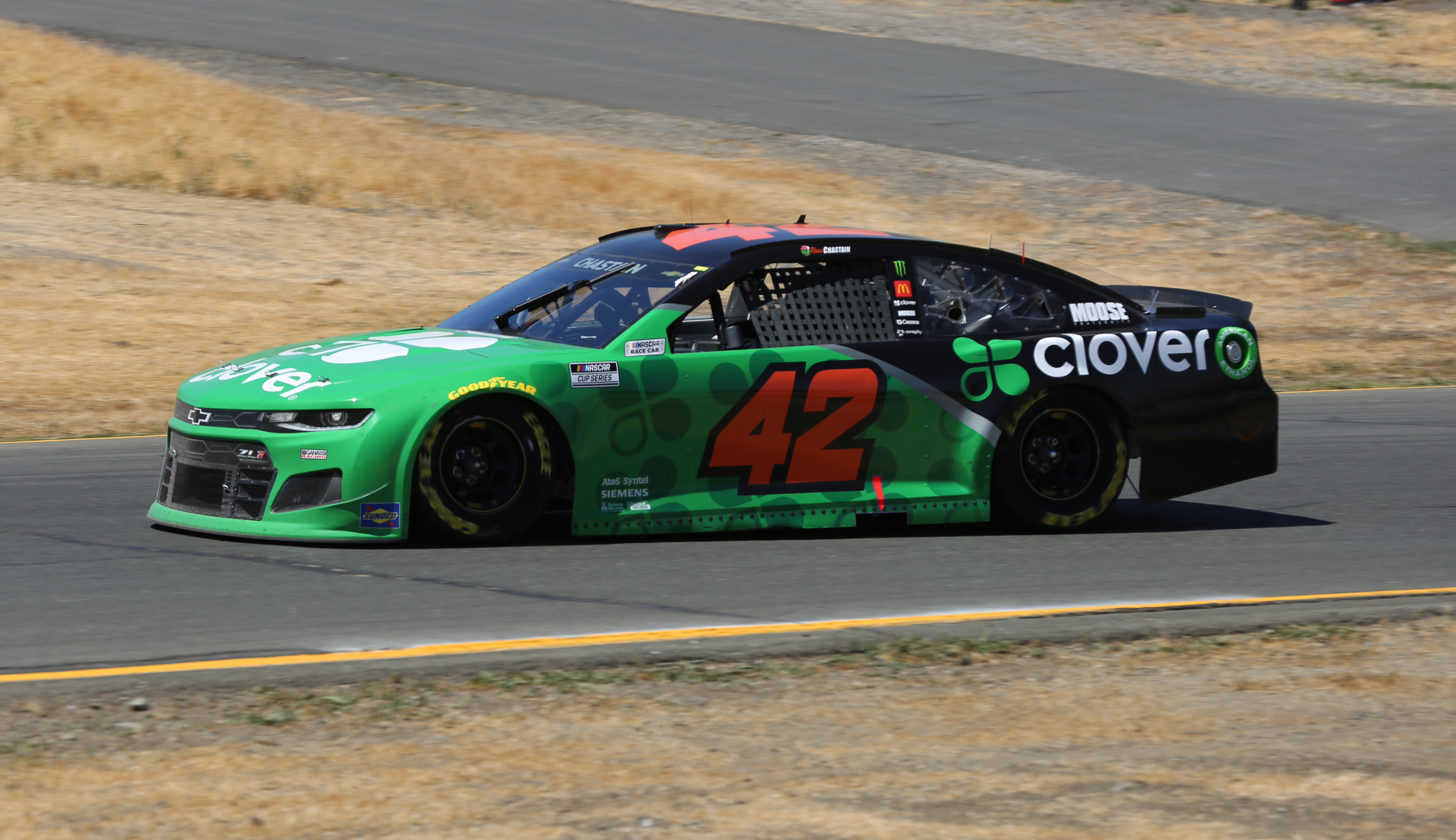
Chastain in the No. 42 at Sonoma Raceway in 2021

Chastain's Cup tenure with Ganassi began with a seventh-place finish in the 2021 Daytona 500, his best Cup finish up to that point. During the race's rain delay, he became the subject of a viral video from CGR in which he ordered food at a McDonald's (a team sponsor) drive-through for the team.

In March, Chastain rejoined Niece for the Truck race at Atlanta. In May, he reunited with SS-Green Light Racing to drive their No. 07 car in the Xfinity Series race at Circuit of the Americas, replacing its normal driver, Joe Graf Jr.

On June 30, 2021, Justin Marks, co-founder of Trackhouse Racing, announced that he had purchased Chip Ganassi Racing's entire NASCAR operations after the 2021 season, leaving Chastain as a free agent. On August 3, 2021, it was revealed that Chastain was the driver for the No. 1 Chevrolet Camaro ZL1 for Trackhouse Racing's upcoming second Cup team, alongside the No. 99 of Daniel Suárez, in a multi-year deal beginning in 2022.

=== 2022: Breakout season ===
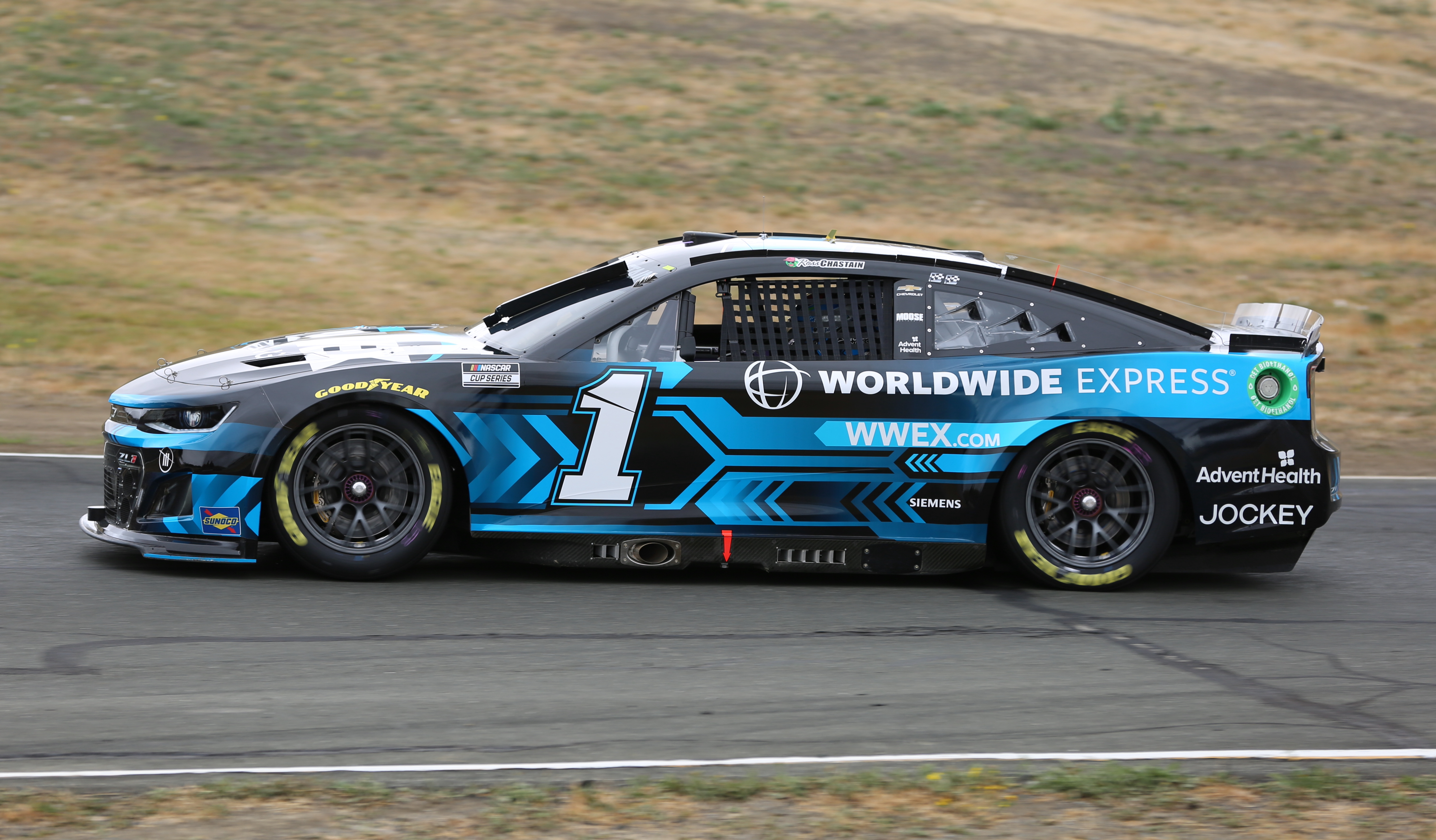
Ross Chastain in the No. 1 at Sonoma Raceway in 2022

Chastain began the 2022 season with a 40th-place finish at the 2022 Daytona 500 and a 29th-place finish at Auto Club Speedway. He then rebounded with a third-place finish, while leading an at the time, career-high 83 laps at Las Vegas Motor Speedway and two runner-up finishes at Phoenix Raceway, and at Atlanta Motor Speedway, after recovering a two lap deficit upon crashing in lead position. Chastain scored his first career Cup win at the Circuit of the Americas, battling against Alex Bowman and A. J. Allmendinger. A month later, he claimed his second victory at Talladega. At the 2022 NASCAR All-Star Race, Chastain finished 22nd after going airborne from colliding with Kyle Busch, taking Chase Elliott out in the process. At the Indianapolis road course, Chastain crossed the line second to Tyler Reddick, but was penalized and scored 27th place for crossing the access road during the final restart. He finished third at the Phoenix finale and a career-best second place in the points standings.

==== Feud with Denny Hamlin ====
In June at Gateway, Chastain began a feud with Denny Hamlin. Early in the race, Chastain ran into Hamlin's back bumper, causing Hamlin to spin and sustain damage to his car. Fifteen laps later, Hamlin attempted to slow Chastain by blocking him at a slower-than-normal speed. NASCAR intervened and told Hamlin that he "had made his point." Later in the same race, Chastain ran into Chase Elliott, causing him to spin. At the restart, Elliott pushed Chastain towards the wall while Hamlin made a tight pass to once again express his frustration. Chastain accepted fault for the incidents, saying, "I just drove over my head so many times".

Weeks later, at Atlanta, Chastain spun Hamlin with fourteen laps to go. This caused Hamlin, who was running in the top five, to fall to the back of the pack. Hamlin said that he had "reached his peak" when referring to dealing with Chastain.

==== "The Hail Melon" ====
In October, Chastain qualified for the Championship 4 by a thin margin at the 2022 Xfinity 500 held at Martinsville Speedway, where he, in tenth place on the last lap of the race, drove his car into the outside wall of the track in Turns 3 and 4 to pick up the unprecedented speed of up to 130 miles per hour (210 km/h), overtaking Hamlin and four other drivers to finish in fifth place (Chastain would later end up in fourth place, due to Brad Keselowski being disqualified in the post-race inspection due to his car being found to be underweight). Chastain set a record for the fastest lap during a NASCAR Cup Series race at the track.

The "wall-riding" move, nicknamed "Hail Melon" as a portmanteau of the Hail Mary pass in American football and "watermelon" in allusion to Chastain's background, was widely commented upon in the media. Chastain said that the move was inspired by playing the video game NASCAR 2005 on the GameCube as a kid with his brother Chad. Overtaken rival Hamlin, who was ultimately eliminated from the playoffs as a direct result of Chastain's move, described it as a "great move", adding that "when you have no other choice, it certainly is easy to do that." Although NASCAR ruled the maneuver legal, some race competitors and commentators criticized the move's safety and NASCAR banned the move the following season, indicating that all future occurrences would result in a time penalty.

Within days, footage of the move received more than 100 million views on Twitter and other social media.

=== 2023 ===
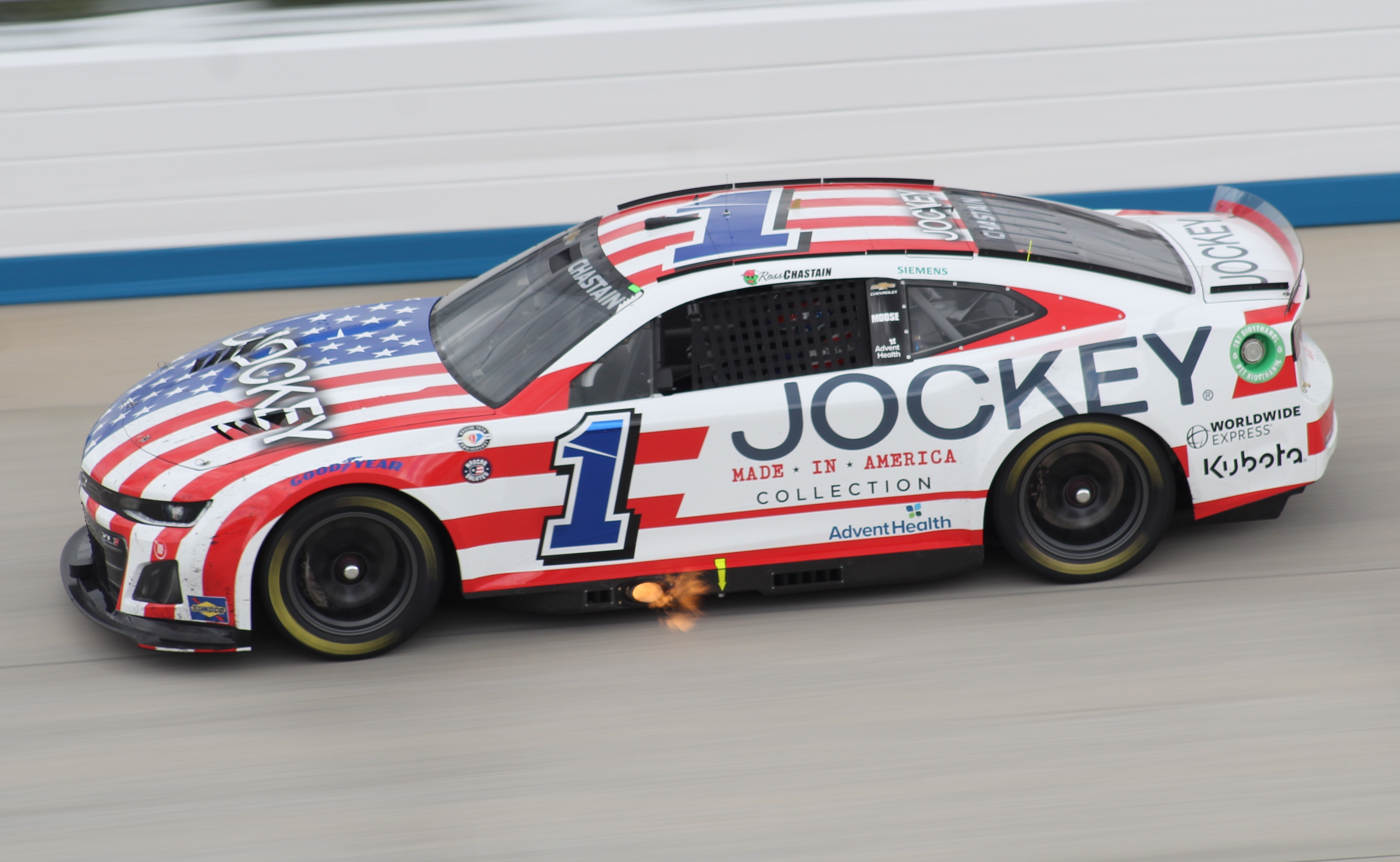
Chastain in the No. 1 at Dover Motor Speedway in 2023

Chastain started the 2023 season with a ninth-place finish at the 2023 Daytona 500. Shortly after finishing fifth at Kansas, Noah Gragson confronted him over a racing incident between them that resulted in Gragson hitting the outside wall. Gragson shoved Chastain, who retaliated with a punch to the face. Chastain scored his first win of the season at Nashville. He was eliminated from the Round of 12 at the conclusion of the Charlotte Roval race, but won the season finale at Phoenix and finished ninth in the points standings.

=== 2024: Missing the playoffs ===
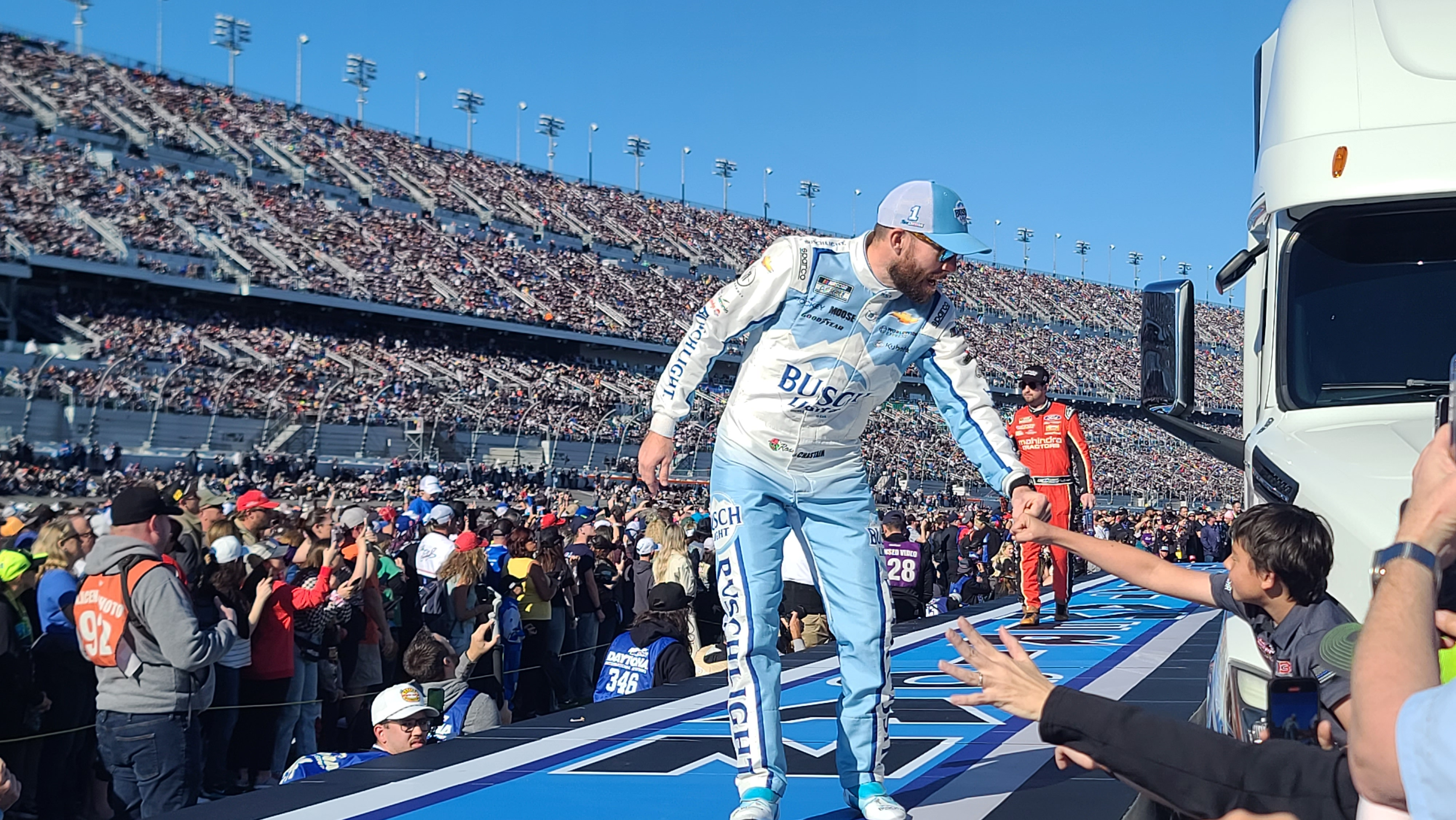
Chastain during driver introductions at the 2024 Daytona 500

Chastain started the 2024 season with a 21st-place finish at the 2024 Daytona 500. Despite having four top-fives and nine top-tens during the regular season, Chastain would go winless and would miss the playoffs for the first time since 2021. During the playoffs, he held off William Byron to win at Kansas. Following the Martinsville playoff race, the No. 1 was docked 50 owner and driver points and Chastain and the team were each fined US$100,000 for race manipulation, when Chastain and fellow Chevrolet driver Austin Dillon formed a blockade to allow William Byron to make the Championship 4. In addition, Surgen was suspended for the Phoenix finale.

In the Truck Series, Chastain returned to Niece Motorsports to drive the No. 45 truck to victory lane at Darlington.

=== 2025 ===
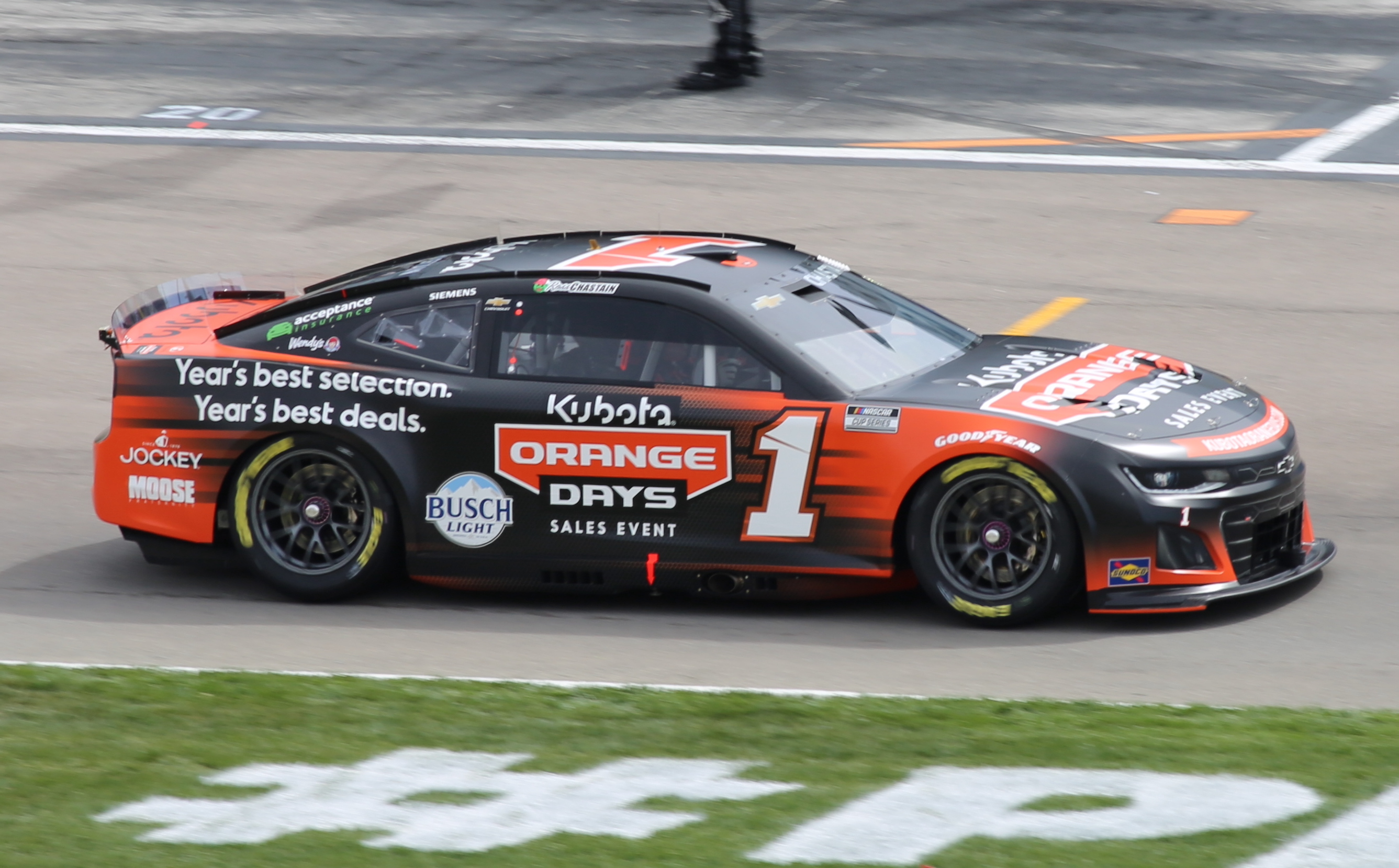
Ross Chastain's No. 1 Chevrolet at Las Vegas Motor Speedway in 2025.

Chastain started the 2025 season with a 40th-place DNF at Daytona. Three months later at Charlotte, he ran down and passed the dominant William Byron with five laps to go and scored his first win of the season, making history as he became the first driver in the modern Cup Series era to win a race in which he started last in. Chastain was eliminated from the Playoffs following Charlotte Roval.

=== 2026 ===
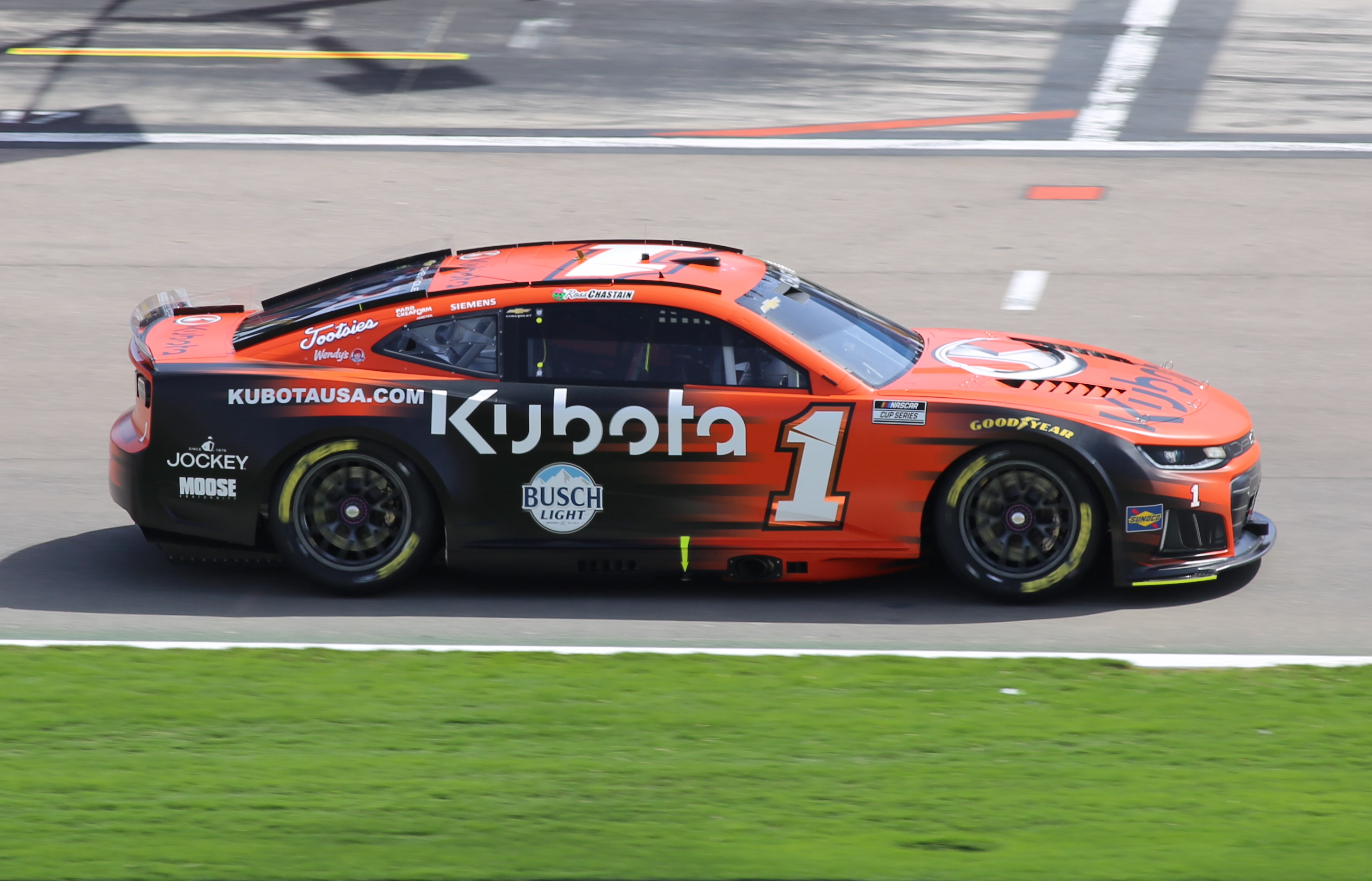
Ross Chastain's No. 1 Chevrolet at Las Vegas Motor Speedway in 2026.

Chastain began the 2026 season with a 20th-place finish at Daytona.

In the O'Reilly Auto Parts Series, Chastain won the rain-shortened race at Charlotte in what would be his first series victory since 2019. Following the race, Chastain performed Kyle Busch's signature bow celebration to honor the former Cup Series champion.

== Personal life ==
A native of Alva, Florida, Chastain was a watermelon farmer on his family's farm until he turned thirteen. He is a graduate of Riverdale High School in Fort Myers. Chastain attended Florida Gulf Coast University for a semester before he began racing in the Truck Series.

While Chastain's father raced as a hobby, Ross is the first generation of his family to race competitively. Ross started racing at age twelve after seeing his father's hobby race and seeing other kids his age race. Ross is the older brother of Chad Chastain.

Motorsports pundits and fans have come up with a variety of rhyming monikers for Chastain, such as Ross "The Boss" originally coined by Mike Joy directly following the finish to the 2022 GEICO 500 at Talladega Superspeedway which Chastain won.

He is the nephew of Roger Chastain, a former stock car racer, who passed away due to COVID-19 complications in 2021, and also of Jane Chastain, the first women's Sportscaster in American History. He is the cousin of professional wrestling Referee John Bryan Ledger of the Tampa Bay Professional Wrestling scene.

== Motorsports career results ==
=== Racing career summary ===
Season	Series	Team	Races	Wins	Top 5	Top 10	Points	Position
2011	NASCAR Camping World Truck Series	Turn One Racing	4	0	0	1	126	34th
2011	NASCAR Camping World Truck Series	Panhandle Motorsports	0	0	0	0	126	34th
2011	NASCAR Camping World Truck Series	RSS Racing	1	0	0	0	126	34th
2012	NASCAR Camping World Truck Series	SS-Green Light Racing	22	0	1	4	502	17th
2013	NASCAR Camping World Truck Series	Brad Keselowski Racing	14	0	4	7	484	18th
2014	NASCAR Xfinity Series	Viva Motorsports	2	0	0	0	0	NC†
2014	NASCAR Xfinity Series	Hattori Racing Enterprises	4	0	0	1	0	NC†
2014	NASCAR Xfinity Series	TriStar Motorsports	1	0	0	0	0	NC†
2014	NASCAR Camping World Truck Series	RBR Enterprises	2	0	0	0	77	45th
2014	NASCAR Camping World Truck Series	Win-Tron Racing	1	0	0	0	77	45th
2014	NASCAR K&N Pro Series East	Hattori Racing Enterprises	2	0	0	1	66	39th
2015	NASCAR Xfinity Series	JD Motorsports	33	0	0	4	785	15th
2015	NASCAR Camping World Truck Series	Hattori Racing Enterprises	0	0	0	0	0	NC†
2016	NASCAR Xfinity Series	JD Motorsports	33	0	0	0	670	16th
2016	NASCAR Camping World Truck Series	Bolen Motorsports	1	0	0	0	0	NC†
2017	NASCAR Cup Series	Premium Motorsports	2	0	0	0	0	NC†
2017	NASCAR Xfinity Series	JD Motorsports	33	0	1	2	595	13th
2017	NASCAR Camping World Truck Series	Bolen Motorsports	7	0	0	2	0	NC†
2018	NASCAR Cup Series	Premium Motorsports	34	0	0	0	0	NC†
2018	NASCAR Xfinity Series	JD Motorsports	30	0	1	6	2184	10th
2018	NASCAR Xfinity Series	Chip Ganassi Racing	3	1	2	2	2184	10th
2018	NASCAR Camping World Truck Series	Beaver Motorsports	2	0	0	0	0	NC†
2018	NASCAR Camping World Truck Series	Premium Motorsports	2	0	0	1	0	NC†
2018	NASCAR Camping World Truck Series	Niece Motorsports	3	0	0	0	0	NC†
2019	NASCAR Cup Series	Premium Motorsports	35	0	0	1	0	NC†
2019	NASCAR Xfinity Series	Kaulig Racing	6	1	2	4	0	NC†
2019	NASCAR Xfinity Series	JD Motorsports	13	0	0	1	0	NC†
2019	NASCAR Xfinity Series	B. J. McLeod Motorsports	0	0	0	0	0	NC†
2019	NASCAR Gander Outdoors Truck Series	Niece Motorsports	23	3	10	19	4033	**2nd**
2020	NASCAR Cup Series	Spire Motorsports	5	0	0	0	0	NC†
2020	NASCAR Cup Series	Roush Fenway Racing	3	0	0	0	0	NC†
2020	NASCAR Xfinity Series	Kaulig Racing	32	0	15	27	2270	7th
2020	NASCAR Xfinity Series	RSS Racing	1	0	0	0	2270	7th
2020	NASCAR Gander RV & Outdoors Truck Series	Niece Motorsports	9	0	1	6	0	NC†
2021	NASCAR Cup Series	Chip Ganassi Racing	36	0	3	8	729	20th
2021	NASCAR Xfinity Series	SS-Green Light Racing	1	0	0	0	0	NC†
2021	NASCAR Camping World Truck Series	Niece Motorsports	4	0	1	2	0	NC†
2022	NASCAR Cup Series	Trackhouse Racing	36	2	15	21	5034	**2nd**
2022	NASCAR Xfinity Series	DGM Racing	3	0	1	1	0	NC†
2022	NASCAR Xfinity Series	Big Machine Racing	2	0	1	1	0	NC†
2022	NASCAR Camping World Truck Series	Niece Motorsports	5	1	2	2	0	NC†
2023	NASCAR Cup Series	Trackhouse Racing	36	2	10	14	2299	9th
2023	NASCAR Xfinity Series	DGM Racing	6	0	0	1	0	NC†
2023	NASCAR Xfinity Series	Kaulig Racing	1	0	0	1	0	NC†
2023	NASCAR Craftsman Truck Series	Niece Motorsports	7	0	2	3	0	NC†
2024	NASCAR Cup Series	Trackhouse Racing	36	1	6	14	852	19th
2024	NASCAR Xfinity Series	DGM Racing	4	0	0	2	0	NC†
2024	NASCAR Craftsman Truck Series	Niece Motorsports	5	1	3	3	0	NC†
2024	Michelin Pilot Challenge – GS	Skip Barber Racing AMR	1	0	0	0	150	64th
2025	NASCAR Cup Series	Trackhouse Racing	36	1	4	12	2272	10th
2025	NASCAR Xfinity Series	JR Motorsports	5	0	3	4	0	NC†
2025	NASCAR Craftsman Truck Series	Niece Motorsports	5	0	1	3	0	NC†

^{†} As Chastain was a guest driver, he was ineligible for championship points.

=== NASCAR ===
(key) (Bold – Pole position awarded by qualifying time. Italics – Pole position earned by points standings or practice time. * – Most laps led.)

==== Cup Series ====
NASCAR Cup Series results
Year	Team	No.	Make	1	2	3	4	5	6	7	8	9	10	11	12	13	14	15	16	17	18	19	20	21	22	23	24	25	26	27	28	29	30	31	32	33	34	35	36	NCSC	Pts	Ref
2017	Premium Motorsports	15	Chevy	DAY	ATL	LVS	PHO	CAL	MAR	TEX	BRI	RCH	TAL	KAN	CLT	DOV; 20	POC	MCH	SON	DAY	KEN	NHA	IND	POC	GLN	MCH	BRI	DAR	RCH	CHI	NHA	DOV; 38	CLT	TAL	KAN	MAR	TEX	PHO	HOM	54th	0^{1}	
2018	Premium Motorsports	15	Chevy	DAY	ATL; 30	LVS; 29	PHO; 27	CAL; 29	MAR; 29	TEX; 18	BRI; 39	RCH; 28	TAL; 25	DOV; 28	KAN; 26	CLT; 24	POC; 28	MCH; 26	SON	CHI; 30	DAY; 21	KEN; 28	NHA; 25	POC; 35	GLN; 32	MCH; 35	BRI; 26	DAR; 28	IND; 26	LVS; 20	RCH; 33		DOV; 37	TAL; 24	KAN; 39	MAR; 29	TEX; 32	PHO; 24	HOM; 33	58th	0^{1}	
2018	Premium Motorsports	7	Chevy																													ROV; 24								58th	0^{1}	
2019	Premium Motorsports	15	Chevy	DAY; 10	ATL; 31	LVS; 33	PHO; 27	CAL; 28	MAR; 34	TEX; 29	BRI; 29	RCH; 30	TAL; 26	DOV; 30	KAN; 31	CLT; 36	POC; 24	MCH	SON; 33	CHI; 26		KEN; 31	NHA; 25	POC; 30	GLN; 27	MCH; 29	BRI; 26	DAR; 28	IND; 22	LVS; 31	RCH; 36	ROV; 22	DOV; 31	TAL; 12	KAN; 27	MAR; 29		PHO; 28		44th	0^{1}	
2019	Premium Motorsports	27	Chevy																		DAY; 30																TEX; 31		HOM; 35	44th	0^{1}	
2020	Spire Motorsports	77	Chevy	DAY; 25						CLT; 21	CLT	BRI	ATL	MAR	HOM	TAL	POC	POC	IND; 17	KEN	TEX	KAN	NHA	MCH	MCH	DRC	DOV	DOV	DAY; 16	DAR; 29	RCH	BRI	LVS	TAL	ROV	KAN	TEX	MAR	PHO	43rd	0^{1}	
2020	Roush Fenway Racing	6	Ford		LVS; 27	CAL; 17	PHO; 23	DAR	DAR																															43rd	0^{1}	
2021	Chip Ganassi Racing	42	Chevy	DAY; 7	DRC; 39	HOM; 17	LVS; 23	PHO; 19	ATL; 14	BRD; 35	MAR; 17	RCH; 15	TAL; 16	KAN; 14	DAR; 15	DOV; 15	COA; 4	CLT; 37	SON; 7	NSH; 2	POC; 33	POC; 26	ROA; 7	ATL; 21	NHA; 8	GLN; 12	IRC; 29	MCH; 35	DAY; 18	DAR; 3	RCH; 7	BRI; 14	LVS; 23	TAL; 33	ROV; 23	TEX; 28	KAN; 13	MAR; 27	PHO; 14	20th	729	
2022	Trackhouse Racing	1	Chevy	DAY; 40	CAL; 29	LVS; 3*	PHO; 2	ATL; 2	COA; 1*	RCH; 19	MAR; 5	BRD; 33	TAL; 1	DOV; 3	DAR; 30	KAN; 7	CLT; 15*	GTW; 8	SON; 7	NSH; 5	ROA; 4	ATL; 2	NHA; 8	POC; 32	IRC; 27	MCH; 24	RCH; 18	GLN; 21	DAY; 33	DAR; 20	KAN; 7	BRI; 6	TEX; 13	TAL; 4*	ROV; 37	LVS; 2*	HOM; 2	MAR; 4	PHO; 3	2nd	5034	
2023	Trackhouse Racing	1	Chevy	DAY; 9	CAL; 3*	LVS; 12	PHO; 24	ATL; 13	COA; 4	RCH; 3	BRD; 28	MAR; 13	TAL; 23	DOV; 2	KAN; 5	DAR; 29	CLT; 22	GTW; 22	SON; 10	**NSH**; 1*	CSC; 22	ATL; 35	NHA; 23	POC; 13	RCH; 24	MCH; 7	IRC; 17	GLN; 18	DAY; 17	DAR; 5	KAN; 13	BRI; 23	TEX; 2	TAL; 37	ROV; 10	LVS; 5	HOM; 31	MAR; 14	PHO; 1*	9th	2299	
2024	Trackhouse Racing	1	Chevy	DAY; 21	ATL; 7	LVS; 4	PHO; 6	BRI; 15	COA; 7	RCH; 15	MAR; 14	TEX; 32	TAL; 13	DOV; 12	KAN; 19	DAR; 11	CLT; 8	GTW; 12	SON; 5	IOW; 11	NHA; 10	NSH; 33	CSC; 22	POC; 36	IND; 15	RCH; 5	MCH; 25	DAY; 12	DAR; 5	ATL; 13	**GLN**; 4*	BRI; 10	KAN; 1	TAL; 40	ROV; 28	LVS; 7	HOM; 33	MAR; 8	PHO; 19	19th	852	
2025	Trackhouse Racing	1	Chevy	DAY; 40	ATL; 8	COA; 12	PHO; 11	LVS; 5	HOM; 31	MAR; 6	DAR; 7	BRI; 7	TAL; 20	TEX; 2	KAN; 18	CLT; 1	NSH; 11	MCH; 6	MXC; 16	POC; 26	ATL; 33	CSC; 10	SON; 24	DOV; 33	IND; 39	IOW; 11	GLN; 10	RCH; 19	DAY; 15	DAR; 11	GTW; 24	BRI; 19	NHA; 9	KAN; 11	ROV; 21	LVS; 23	TAL; 13	MAR; 4	PHO; 13	10th	2272	
2026	Trackhouse Racing	1	Chevy	DAY; 20	ATL; 3	COA; 35	PHO; 28	LVS; 17	DAR; 16	MAR; 16	BRI; 20	KAN; 26	TAL; 7	TEX; 26	GLN; 27	CLT; 35	NSH; 37	MCH; 16	POC; 8	COR; 7	SON; 14	CHI; 18	ATL; 11	NWS; 27	IND; 23	IOW; 7	RCH; 12	NHA; 36	**DAY**; 24	DAR; 27	GTW; 5	BRI; 12	KAN; 15	LVS; 30	CLT; 16	PHO; 9	TAL; 4	MAR; 11	HOM; 27	18th	752	

===== Daytona 500 =====
Year	Team	Manufacturer	Start	Finish
2019	Premium Motorsports	Chevrolet	36	10
2020	Spire Motorsports	Chevrolet	20	25
2021	Chip Ganassi Racing	Chevrolet	34	7
2022	Trackhouse Racing	Chevrolet	19	40
2023	Trackhouse Racing	Chevrolet	23	9
2024	Trackhouse Racing	Chevrolet	21	21
2025	Trackhouse Racing	Chevrolet	9	40
2026	Trackhouse Racing	Chevrolet	37	20

==== O'Reilly Auto Parts Series ====
NASCAR O'Reilly Auto Parts Series results
Year	Team	No.	Make	1	2	3	4	5	6	7	8	9	10	11	12	13	14	15	16	17	18	19	20	21	22	23	24	25	26	27	28	29	30	31	32	33	NOAPSC	Pts	Ref
2014	Viva Motorsports	55	Chevy	DAY	PHO	LVS	BRI	CAL	TEX	DAR	RCH	TAL	IOW	CLT; 18	DOV				DAY; 29	NHA	CHI	IND	IOW	GLN	MOH	BRI	ATL	RCH									96th^{1}	0^{1}	
2014	Hattori Racing Enterprises	80	Toyota													MCH; 12	ROA	KEN											CHI; 19	KEN; 10	DOV	KAN	CLT; 21	TEX	PHO		96th^{1}	0^{1}	
2014	TriStar Motorsports	10	Toyota																																	HOM; 14	96th^{1}	0^{1}	
2015	JD Motorsports	4	Chevy	DAY; 9	ATL; 24	LVS; 18	PHO; 27	CAL; 17	TEX; 21	BRI; 27	RCH; 17	TAL; 25	IOW; 32	CLT; 31	DOV; 16	MCH; 21		DAY; 10	KEN; 20	NHA; 37	IND; 22	IOW; 10	GLN; 17	MOH; 19	BRI; 17		DAR; 10	RCH; 15	CHI; 16	KEN; 18	DOV; 37	CLT; 24	KAN; 14	TEX; 16	PHO; 19	HOM; 19	15th	785	
2015	JD Motorsports	01	Chevy														CHI; 18									ROA; 27											15th	785	
2016	JD Motorsports	4	Chevy	DAY; 22	ATL; 28	LVS; 16	PHO; 24	CAL; 19	TEX; 21	BRI; 22	RCH; 18	TAL; 16	DOV; 20	CLT; 17	POC; 19	MCH; 16	IOW; 14	DAY; 11	KEN; 22	NHA; 31	IND; 21	IOW; 18	GLN; 14	MOH; 14	BRI; 32	ROA; 33	DAR; 29	RCH; 24	CHI; 39	KEN; 19	DOV; 12	CLT; 21	KAN; 13	TEX; 21	PHO; 20	HOM; 22	16th	670	
2017	JD Motorsports	4	Chevy	DAY; 16	ATL; 25	LVS; 25	PHO; 22	CAL; 37	TEX; 23	BRI; 31	RCH; 38	TAL; 19	CLT; 15	DOV; 21	POC; 24	MCH; 19	IOW; 4	DAY; 6	KEN; 20	NHA; 19	IND; 16	IOW; 18	GLN; 19	MOH; 15	BRI; 15	ROA; 13	DAR; 14	RCH; 28	CHI; 22	KEN; 21	DOV; 12	CLT; 14	KAN; 17	TEX; 19	PHO; 19	HOM; 17	13th	595	
2018	JD Motorsports	4	Chevy	DAY; 9	ATL; 16	LVS; 18	PHO; 19	CAL; 10	TEX; 28	BRI; 9	RCH; 18	TAL; 34	DOV; 16	CLT; 26	POC; 11	MCH; 14	IOW; 19	CHI; 13	DAY; 10	KEN; 17	NHA; 26	IOW; 4	GLN; 20	MOH; 16	BRI; 12	ROA; 7		IND; 12			ROV; 12	DOV; 13	KAN; 25	TEX; 11	PHO; 15	HOM; 16	10th	2184	
2018	Chip Ganassi Racing	42	Chevy																								**DAR**; 25*		LVS; 1*	RCH; 2							10th	2184	
2019	Kaulig Racing	10	Chevy	DAY; 13								TAL; 30						CHI; 8															KAN; 10	TEX; 2	PHO	HOM	80th	0^{2}	
2019	JD Motorsports	4	Chevy		ATL; 14	LVS; 7	PHO; 17	CAL; 18	TEX; 16	BRI; 33	RCH; 11		DOV; 12	CLT; 11	POC; 14	MCH; 14	IOW						GLN; 33	MOH	BRI	ROA	DAR	IND	LVS	RCH	ROV	DOV; 13					80th	0^{2}	
2019	Kaulig Racing	16	Chevy																DAY; 1*	KEN																	80th	0^{2}	
2019	B. J. McLeod Motorsports	78	Chevy																		NHA; QL^{†}	IOW															80th	0^{2}	
2020	Kaulig Racing	10	Chevy	DAY; DNQ	LVS; 10	CAL; 8	PHO; 9	DAR; 8	CLT; 4	BRI; 28	ATL; 7	HOM; 9	HOM; 3	TAL; 2*	POC; 2*	IRC; 6	KEN; 3	KEN; 4	TEX; 9	KAN; 5	ROA; 7	DRC; 36	DOV; 3	DOV; 2	DAY; 6	DAR; 2	RCH; 5	RCH; 3	BRI; 2	LVS; 16	TAL; 6	ROV; 5	KAN; 12	TEX; 16	MAR; 5	PHO; 7	7th	2270	
2020	RSS Racing	38	Chevy	DAY; 22																																	7th	2270	
2021	SS-Green Light Racing	07	Chevy	DAY	DRC	HOM	LVS	PHO	ATL	MAR	TAL	DAR	DOV	COA; 30	CLT	MOH	TEX	NSH	POC	ROA	ATL	NHA	GLN	IRC	MCH	DAY	DAR	RCH	BRI	LVS	TAL	ROV	TEX	KAN	MAR	PHO	100th	0^{1}	
2022	DGM Racing	92	Chevy	DAY	CAL	LVS	PHO	ATL	COA; 17	RCH	MAR	TAL	DOV	DAR	TEX	CLT	PIR	NSH	ROA	ATL	NHA	POC	IRC; 4	MCH	GLN; 28	DAY											81st	0^{1}	
2022	Big Machine Racing	48	Chevy																								DAR; 15	KAN; 5	BRI	TEX	TAL	ROV	LVS	HOM	MAR	PHO	81st	0^{1}	
2023	DGM Racing	91	Chevy	DAY	CAL; 24	LVS	PHO	ATL	COA	RCH	MAR	TAL	DOV	DAR; 18	CLT	PIR	SON; 18	NSH	CSC	ATL	NHA	POC	ROA		IRC; 37	GLN; 4	DAY	DAR; 23	KAN	BRI	TEX	ROV	LVS	HOM	MAR	PHO	80th	0^{1}	
2023	Kaulig Racing	10	Chevy																					MCH; 7													80th	0^{1}	
2024	DGM Racing	92	Chevy	DAY	ATL	LVS	PHO	COA	RCH	MAR	TEX	TAL	DOV	DAR	CLT	PIR	SON	IOW; 9	NHA	NSH; 27	CSC	POC	IND	MCH	DAY	DAR; 12	ATL	GLN; 6	BRI	KAN	TAL	ROV	LVS	HOM	MAR	PHO	86th	0^{1}	
2025	JR Motorsports	9	Chevy	DAY	ATL	COA; 8	PHO	LVS	HOM	MAR	DAR; 4	BRI	CAR	TAL	TEX	CLT	NSH; 5	MXC	POC	ATL	CSC	SON	DOV; 38	IND	IOW; 3*	GLN	DAY	PIR	GTW	BRI	KAN	ROV	LVS	TAL	MAR	PHO	82nd	0^{1}	
2026	Jordan Anderson Racing	32	Chevy	DAY	ATL; 6	COA; 9	PHO	LVS								GLN; 4						SON; 37	CHI	ATL													71st	0^{1}	
2026	JR Motorsports	9	Chevy						DAR; 14								**DOV**; 13	CLT; 1	NSH	POC	COR				IND; 3*	IOW; 4	DAY	DAR	GTW	BRI	LVS	CLT	PHO	TAL	MAR	HOM	71st	0^{1}	
2026	DGM Racing with Jesse Iwuji Motorsports	91	Chevy							MAR; 8	CAR	BRI	KAN	TAL	TEX																						71st	0^{1}	
^{†} – Qualified for Vinnie Miller

==== Craftsman Truck Series ====
NASCAR Craftsman Truck Series results
Year	Team	No.	Make	1	2	3	4	5	6	7	8	9	10	11	12	13	14	15	16	17	18	19	20	21	22	23	24	25	NCTC	Pts	Ref
2011	Turn One Racing	66	Chevy	DAY	PHO	DAR	MAR	NSH	DOV	CLT	KAN	TEX	KEN	IOW	NSH	IRP; 10	POC	MCH	BRI; 19	ATL	CHI	NHA	KEN; 22	LVS	TAL	MAR	TEX; 16		34th	126	
2011	Panhandle Motorsports	20	Chevy																									HOM; DNQ	34th	126	
2011	RSS Racing	93	Chevy																									HOM; 27	34th	126	
2012	SS-Green Light Racing	08	Toyota	DAY; 28	MAR; 7	CAR; 25	KAN; 34	CLT; 35	DOV; 15	TEX; 16	KEN; 33	IOW; 16	CHI; 13	POC; 10	MCH; 18	BRI; 3	ATL; 20	IOW; 11	KEN; 28	LVS; 25	TAL; 34	MAR; 23	TEX; 31		HOM; 10				17th	502	
2012	SS-Green Light Racing	07	Chevy																					PHO; 33					17th	502	
2013	Brad Keselowski Racing	19	Ford	DAY; 14	MAR; 20	CAR	KAN	CLT; 9	DOV; 16	TEX; 13	KEN	IOW; 13	ELD	POC; 5	MCH	BRI	MSP; 7	**IOW**; 2*	CHI	LVS; 14	TAL; 3	MAR; 14	TEX	**PHO**; 2	HOM; 8				18th	484	
2014	RBR Enterprises	92	Ford	DAY; 30	MAR; 14	KAN	CLT	DOV	TEX	GTW	KEN	IOW	ELD	POC	MCH	BRI	MSP	CHI	NHA	LVS	TAL	MAR	TEX	PHO					45th	77	
2014	Win-Tron Racing	35	Toyota																						HOM; 11				45th	77	
2015	Hattori Racing Enterprises	18	Toyota	DAY	ATL	MAR	KAN	CLT	DOV	TEX	GTW	IOW	KEN	ELD	POC	MCH	BRI	MSP	CHI; DNQ	NHA	LVS	TAL	MAR	TEX	PHO	HOM			112th	0^{1}	
2016	Bolen Motorsports	66	Chevy	DAY	ATL	MAR	KAN	DOV	CLT	TEX	IOW	GTW	KEN	ELD	POC	BRI	MCH	MSP	CHI	NHA	LVS	TAL; 15	MAR	TEX	PHO	HOM			95th	0^{1}	
2017	Bolen Motorsports	66	Chevy	DAY; 30	ATL; 10	MAR; 7	KAN; 18	CLT; 19	DOV; 15	TEX	GTW	IOW	KEN; 13	ELD	POC	MCH	BRI	MSP	CHI	NHA	LVS	TAL	MAR	TEX	PHO	HOM			80th	0^{1}	
2018	Beaver Motorsports	50	Chevy	DAY	ATL	LVS	MAR	DOV	KAN	CLT	TEX	IOW; 30	GTW; 29																96th	0^{1}	
2018	Premium Motorsports	15	Chevy											CHI; 26	KEN	ELD	POC	MCH			LVS; 7	TAL	MAR						96th	0^{1}	
2018	Niece Motorsports	38	Chevy																BRI; 12	MSP				TEX; 26	PHO	HOM; 16			96th	0^{1}	
2019	Niece Motorsports	45	Chevy	DAY; 3	ATL; 6	LVS; 10	MAR; 4	TEX; 7	DOV; 10	KAN; 1	CLT; 10			GTW; 1	CHI; 7	KEN; 4	POC; 1*	ELD; 12	**MCH**; 30	BRI; 3*	MSP; 8	LVS; 2*	TAL; 22	MAR; 2	PHO; 9	HOM; 4			2nd	4033^{2}	
2019	Niece Motorsports	38	Chevy									TEX; 10																	2nd	4033^{2}	
2019	Niece Motorsports	44	Chevy										IOW; 32*																2nd	4033^{2}	
2020	Niece Motorsports	40	Chevy	DAY; 8	LVS; 14				POC; 6	KEN		KAN; 34	KAN	MCH	DRC	DOV	GTW	DAR	RCH										81st	0^{1}	
2020	Niece Motorsports	42	Chevy			CLT; 11	ATL; 6				TEX; 10									BRI; 8	LVS	TAL	KAN	TEX	MAR	PHO			81st	0^{1}	
2020	Niece Motorsports	44	Chevy					HOM; 3																					81st	0^{1}	
2021	Niece Motorsports	44	Chevy	DAY	DRC	LVS	ATL; 7	BRD	RCH	KAN; 2	DAR	COA	CLT																96th	0^{1}*	
2021	Niece Motorsports	45	Chevy											TEX; 36	NSH; 22	POC	KNX	GLN	GTW	DAR	BRI	LVS	TAL	MAR	PHO				96th	0^{1}*	
2022	Niece Motorsports	41	Chevy	DAY	LVS	ATL; 23	COA	MAR	BRD	DAR; 26	KAN	TEX; 12	CLT; 1	GTW	SON; 4	KNX	NSH	MOH	POC	IRP	RCH	KAN	BRI	TAL	HOM	PHO			87th	0^{1}	
2023	Niece Motorsports	41	Chevy	DAY	LVS; 24	ATL	**COA**; 5	TEX	BRD	MAR; 12	KAN; 5	DAR; 13	NWS; 9	CLT	GTW	NSH	MOH	POC; 30	RCH	IRP	MLW	KAN	BRI	TAL	HOM	PHO			93rd	0^{1}	
2024	Niece Motorsports	45	Chevy	DAY	ATL	LVS	BRI	COA; 5	MAR	TEX	KAN	DAR; 1	NWS; 15	CLT	GTW	NSH	POC; 5	IRP; 11	RCH	MLW	BRI	KAN	TAL	HOM	MAR	PHO			80th	0^{1}	
2025	Niece Motorsports	44	Chevy	DAY	ATL	LVS	HOM; 6	MAR	BRI	CAR	TEX	KAN	NWS	CLT; 2	NSH	MCH; 26	POC	LRP	IRP; 9	GLN; 30	RCH	DAR	BRI	NHA	ROV	TAL	MAR	PHO	80th	0^{1}	
2026	Niece Motorsports	45	Chevy	DAY	ATL	STP	DAR; 2	CAR	BRI; 4	TEX; 12	GLN; 28	DOV; 18	CLT; 29	NSH; 4	MCH; 17	COR	LRP	NWS	IRP	RCH	NHA	BRI	KAN	CLT	PHO	TAL	MAR	HOM	98th	0^{1}	

^{*} Season still in progress
^{1} Ineligible for series points
^{2} Chastain began the 2019 season racing for Xfinity Series points but switched to Truck Series points before the SpeedyCash.com 400 at Texas.

==== K&N Pro Series East ====
NASCAR K&N Pro Series East results
Year	Team	No.	Make	1	2	3	4	5	6	7	8	9	10	11	12	13	14	15	16	NKNPSEC	Pts	Ref
2014	Hattori Racing Enterprises	1	Toyota	NSM	DAY	BRI	GRE	RCH	IOW	BGS	FIF	LGY	NHA	COL; 6	IOW; 17	GLN	VIR	GRE	DOV	39th	66	

==== CARS Late Model Stock Car Tour ====
(key) (Bold – Pole position awarded by qualifying time. Italics – Pole position earned by points standings or practice time. * – Most laps led. ** – All laps led.)

CARS Late Model Stock Car Tour results
Year	Team	No.	Make	1	2	3	4	5	6	7	8	9	10	11	12	13	14	15	16	CLMSCTC	Pts	Ref
2023	Pinnacle Racing Group	28	Chevy	SNM	FLC	HCY	ACE	NWS; 19	LGY	DOM	CRW	HCY	ACE	TCM	WKS	AAS	SBO	TCM	CRW	69th	14	

Achievements
Preceded by Christopher Bell	Coca-Cola 600 Winner; 2025	Succeeded by Daniel Suárez
