= Kelly Gregg =

American football player and radio host (born 1976)

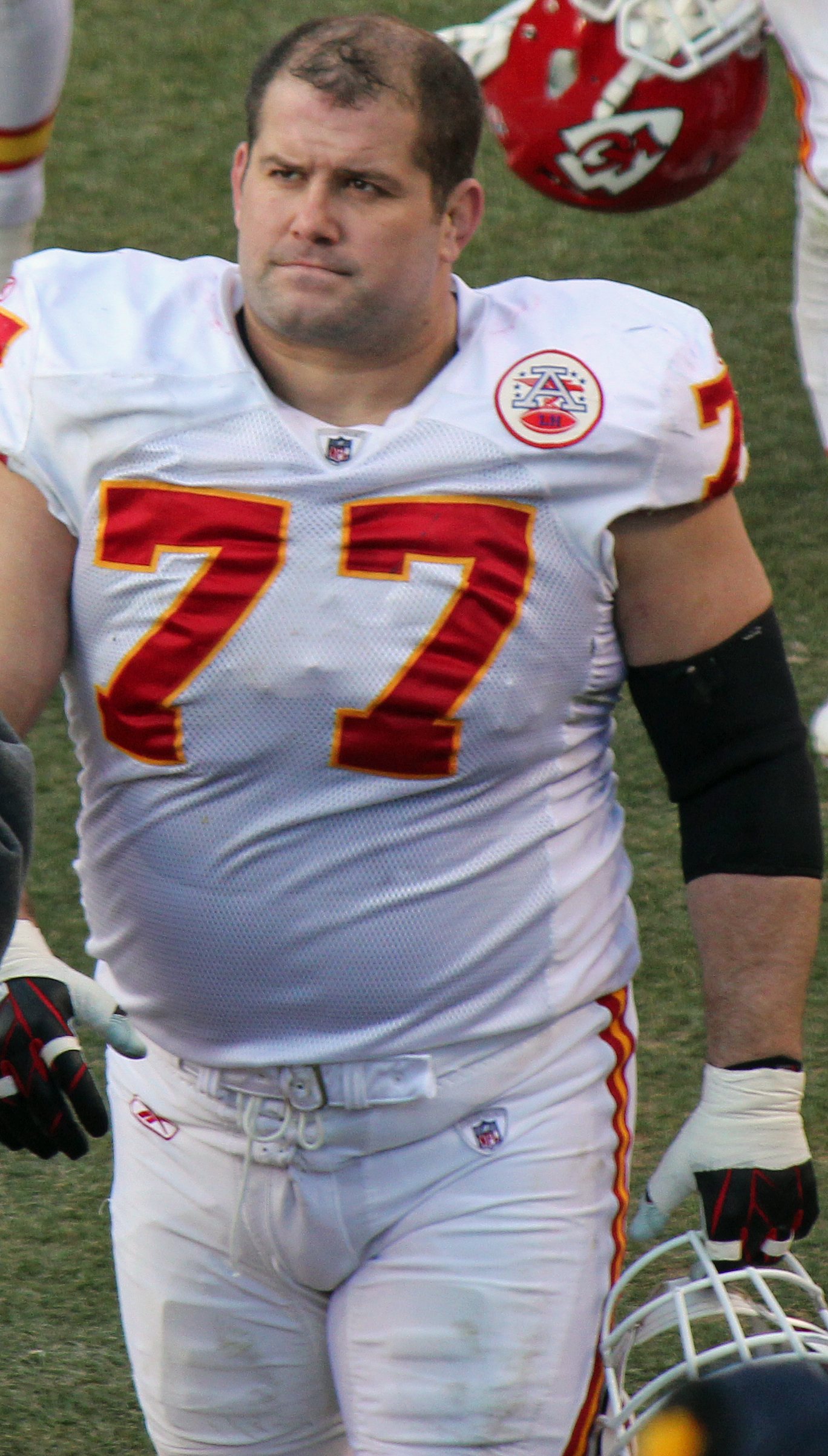
- Gregg with the Kansas City Chiefs in 2011

No. 94, 73, 97, 77
- Position: Nose tackle

Personal information
- Born: November 1, 1976 (age 50); Wichita, Kansas, U.S.
- Listed height: 6 ft 0 in (1.83 m)
- Listed weight: 320 lb (145 kg)

Career information
- College: Oklahoma
- NFL draft: 1999: 6th round, 173rd overall pick

Career history
- Cincinnati Bengals (1999)*; Philadelphia Eagles (1999–2000); Baltimore Ravens (2000–2010); → Rhein Fire (2001); Kansas City Chiefs (2011)
- * Offseason or practice squad member only

Awards and highlights
- Super Bowl champion (XXXV); First-team All-Big 12 (1998); Second-team All-Big 12 (1997)

Career NFL statistics
- Total tackles: 551
- Sacks: 20.5
- Forced fumbles: 2
- Stats at Pro Football Reference

Kelly Michael Gregg (born November 1, 1976) is an American former professional football player who was a nose tackle in the National Football League (NFL). He currently contributes to various radio programs in Oklahoma City on 107.7 "The Franchise". He was selected by the Cincinnati Bengals in the sixth round of the 1999 NFL draft. He played college football for the Oklahoma Sooners.

Gregg was a member of the Baltimore Ravens practice squad during the team's Super Bowl XXXV-winning season. He played with the Ravens through the 2010 season. He spent time in his early career with the Cincinnati Bengals and Philadelphia Eagles, and was a starter for the Kansas City Chiefs in 2011. His nickname "Buddy Lee" was coined by Tony Siragusa when they first met on the day Gregg signed with the Ravens in September 2000.

== Early life ==
Gregg attended Edmond North High School in Edmond, Oklahoma, and was a standout in football and wrestling. In wrestling, he was a three-time state champion, 1993-1994-1995 in the Heavyweight division. He was named wrestler of the year by the Daily Oklahoman in 1995.

In football, he was a two-time All-State selection and was named the city's Defensive Player of the Year by the Daily Oklahoman as a senior in 1994.

== College career ==
Gregg chose to play college football at the University of Oklahoma. Named All-Big 12 first-team as a Junior (1997) and Senior (1998), despite playing for teams with losing records in both seasons. Recorded 117 tackles during his senior season at Oklahoma in 1998, including a Big 12-leading and still-standing Sooner record of 24 tackles for loss. His 53 career tackles for loss still rank second all-time at Oklahoma. He also tallied nine sacks in 1998, which still ranks as the 5th best season by a Sooner. His 19 career sacks are seventh all-time for the sooners. He led the Sooners in tackles his final two seasons with 117 (1998) and 98 (1997), becoming the first defensive lineman to do so in 30 years. He majored in sociology.

=== Statistics ===
Season	Tackles			Sacks		Tackles for loss	
Season	UT	AT	TT	Sack	YdsL	TFL	Yds
1995	17	7	24	3	11	3	22
1996	53	27	80	2	2	17	22
1997	70	28	98	5	24	10	21
1998	73	44	117	9	51	23	74
Career	213	106	319	19	88	53	160

== Professional career ==
Pre-draft measurables
Height	Weight	Arm length	Hand span	40-yard dash	10-yard split	20-yard split	20-yard shuttle	Three-cone drill	Vertical jump	Broad jump	Bench press
6 ft 0 3/8 in (1.84 m)	302 lb (137 kg)	30 in (0.76 m)	9 1/8 in (0.23 m)	5.34 s	1.83 s	3.03 s	4.45 s	7.72 s	24.0 in (0.61 m)	8 ft 0 in (2.44 m)	26 reps
All values from NFL Combine

=== Cincinnati Bengals ===
Gregg was selected by the Cincinnati Bengals in the sixth round (173rd overall) of the 1999 NFL draft. He was waived by the team on September 6 then re-signed to the practice squad on September 8.

=== Philadelphia Eagles ===
On December 12, 1999, Gregg was signed to the active roster of the Philadelphia Eagles. He was waived on September 12, 2000.

=== Baltimore Ravens ===
Gregg was signed to the practice squad of the Baltimore Ravens on September 13, 2000. He earned a Super Bowl ring when the Ravens, having an NFL record-setting defense, beat the New York Giants in Super Bowl XXXV. The following offseason, Gregg recorded six sacks in NFL Europe as a member of the Rhein Fire.

He contributed more as an active member of the roster in 2001, and the following year, after the loss of many veteran members of the 2000 Super Bowl winning defense, including nose tackle Tony Siragusa, Gregg became the full-time starting nose-tackle for the Ravens in 2002. He maintained that starting role through the 2010 season. His first full year as a starter, he collected 56 tackles and two sacks. By the following season, he was already considered one of the toughest nose tackles in the league, especially against the run. 2003 was a standout season for him, as he produced 80 tackles and 2 sacks.

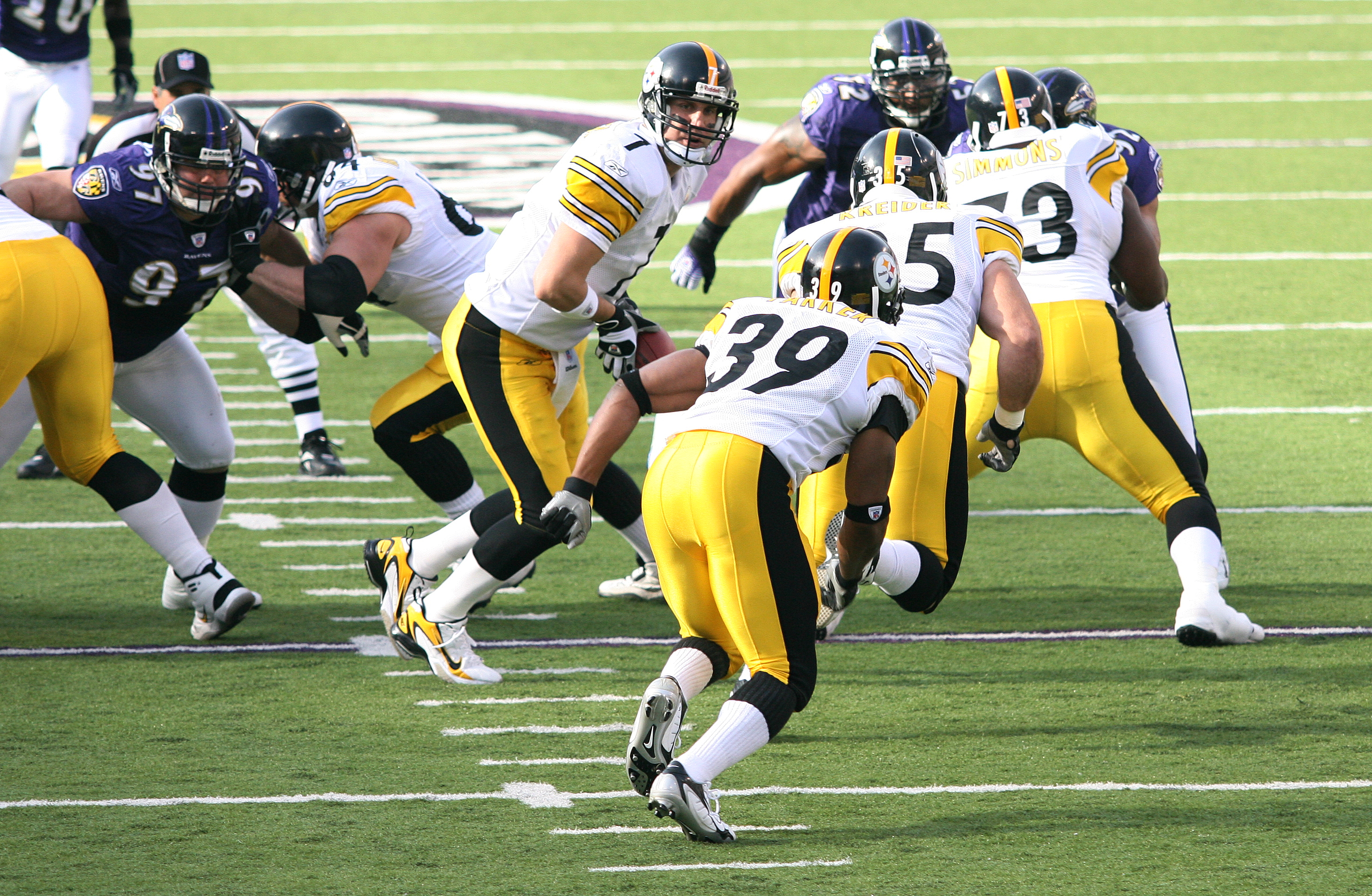
Gregg (97) playing against the Pittsburgh Steelers in 2006.

Over the following years, he helped maintain the Baltimore Ravens' reputation as a team with a top notch defense. He was a key part of several multi-game stretches of time where the Ravens defense did not allow a 100-yard rusher in a single game. Perhaps the best stretch of his career, was in 2006 and 2007. In 2006, he was a big part of the Ravens #1 ranked defense, and had a career-high 3.5 sacks. In 2007, he also notched a career-high 83 tackles, as well as 3 sacks.

Gregg was placed on season-ending injured reserve on October 8, 2008, after he underwent microfracture surgery on his left knee. The team signed defensive tackle Brandon McKinney to replace him on the roster. Gregg returned in 2009 and put in a strong year with 63 tackles (46 solo) and 3 sacks. In the 2010 season, he remained the starter, but split playing time with rookie Terrence Cody. He still recorded 34 tackles.

Gregg was released on July 28, 2011, due to salary cap constraints. While never voted to a Pro Bowl in his ten years as a Baltimore Raven, he was often considered one of the most effective nose tackles—and one of the most underrated players—in the league. In 10 years as a Raven, he notched over 500 tackles, and 19.5 sacks, and 27 post-season tackles.

=== Kansas City Chiefs ===
Gregg was signed by the Kansas City Chiefs on July 30, 2011. In the 2011 season, Gregg finished with 39 tackles and 1 sack.

=== Career statistics ===
Year	Team	Games	Tackles					Misc.	
Year	Team	Games	Solo	Ast	Total	Sack	YdsL	FFum	PD
1999	PHI	3	2	0	2	0.0	0	0	0
2000	BAL	0	Did not play						
2001	BAL	8	7	3	10	1.0	7	0	1
2002	BAL	16	45	11	56	2.0	14	0	0
2003	BAL	16	63	17	80	3.0	15	0	0
2004	BAL	14	44	17	61	1.5	6	1	1
2005	BAL	16	36	25	61	2.5	15	0	2
2006	BAL	16	41	21	62	3.5	23	1	2
2007	BAL	16	56	27	83	3.0	15	0	3
2008	BAL	0	Did not play						
2009	BAL	16	46	17	63	3.0	0	0	0
2010	BAL	16	12	15	34	0.0	15	0	0
2011	KC	16	24	15	39	1.0	0	0	1
Career		127	352	153	512	19.5	98	2	9
