= Tommy Watkins =

American baseball player and coach (born 1980)

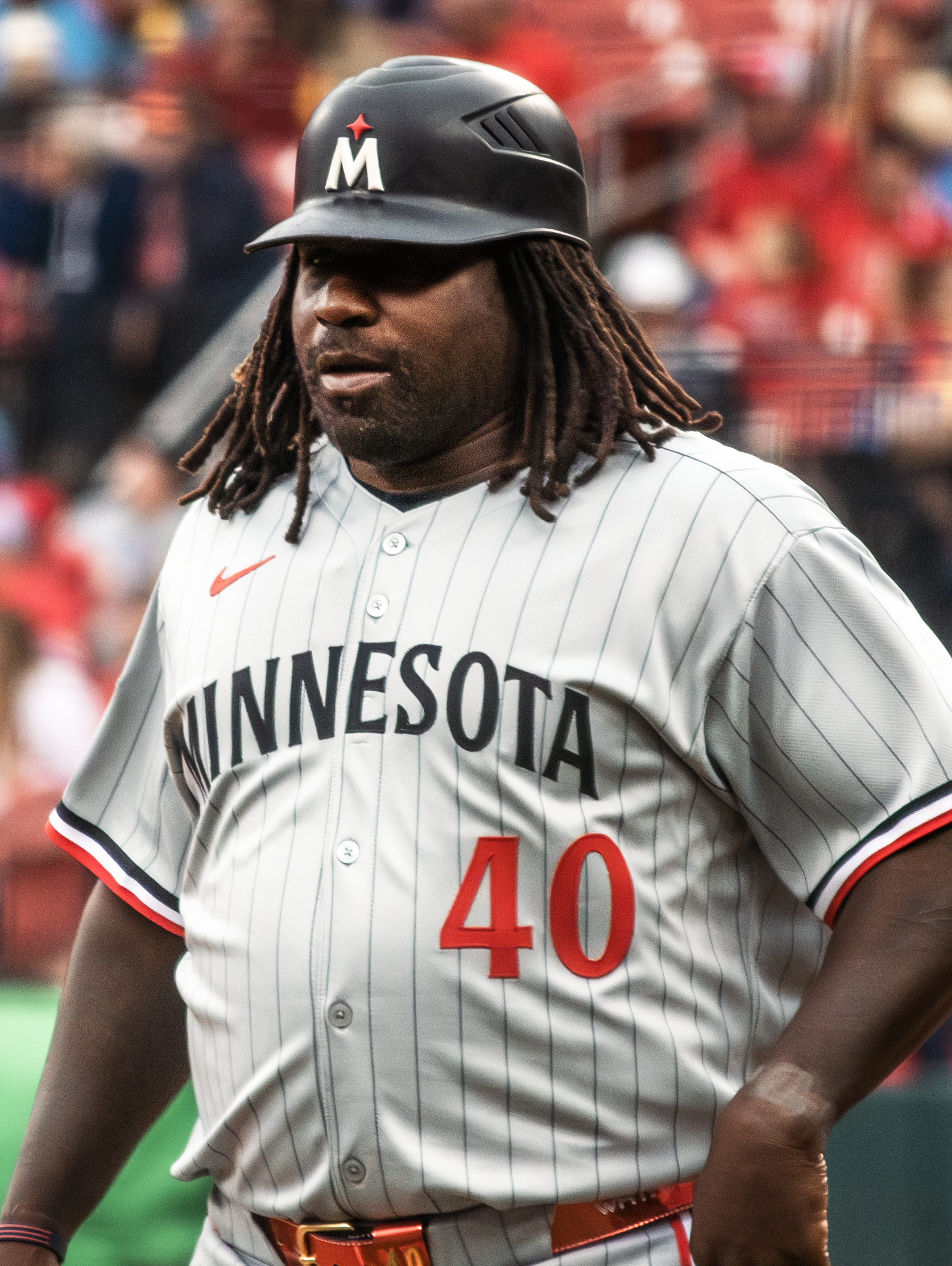
- Watkins with the Twins in 2025

Atlanta Braves – No. 84
- Third Baseman / Coach
- Born: June 18, 1980 (age 46); Fort Myers, Florida, U.S.

MLB debut
- August 10, 2007, for the Minnesota Twins

Last MLB appearance
- August 22, 2007, for the Minnesota Twins

MLB statistics
- Games: 9
- Batting average: .357
- Runs scored: 2
- Stats at Baseball Reference

Teams
- As player: Minnesota Twins (2007); As coach: Minnesota Twins (2019–2025); Atlanta Braves (2026–present)

Thomas Gray "The Mayor" Watkins, Jr. (born June 18, 1980) is an American former professional baseball third baseman and current coach. He is the third base coach for the Atlanta Braves of Major League Baseball (MLB). He played in MLB for the Minnesota Twins. In 2018 he served as manager of the Twins' Double-A affiliate, the Chattanooga Lookouts of the Southern League, after almost a decade as a coach in the Twins' farm system.

== Hometown favorite ==
Watkins was drafted by the Twins in the 38th round of the 1998 Major League Baseball draft from Riverdale High School in Fort Myers, Florida, and was a fan favorite during his two-year stint with the Twins high A affiliate, the Fort Myers Miracle (2002–2003). Watkins' popularity with Miracle fans translated into one of the more interesting promotions in minor league history when he was the subject of the "Tommy Watkins Bobble-Butt" late in the 2003 season.

It was while with the Miracle that Watkins became more of a utility player. In 2002, he made 41 appearances at shortstop, 33 at third base, 19 at second base and three in the outfield. In 2003, he made his debut as a first baseman (8 times), and played all three outfield positions (38 total appearances), as well as making 28 appearances at third, 17 at shortstop, and nine at second.

== MLB debut ==
Watkins hit eight home runs his second season with the triple-A Rochester Red Wings to match his minor-league career high of eight home runs in 2004 with the New Britain Rock Cats (Double-A). Also in 2007, he reached a career high in batting average (.272), doubles (22) and RBIs (49).

The Twins promoted Watkins on August 8, 2007, from Triple-A Rochester. Twins general manager Terry Ryan announced his call-up while visiting the Red Wings; the news was very well received by his teammates. Watkins spent ten years in the minors, all with the Twins, before making his major league debut.

Red Wings Manager Stan Cliburn stated that Watkins' promotion to the big leagues "was one of the most emotional call-ups [he had] ever been involved with." The announcement "set off a joyous celebration in the clubhouse, because of everyone's love, passion and respect for Tommy."

Watkins was the 14th player from the Red Wings to be promoted to the Minnesota Twins in 2007. He was with the Red Wings in Rochester, New York and joined the Twins in Kansas City, Missouri. Watkins made his major league debut on August 10, 2007. He recorded his first major league hit August 15, 2007, while playing the Seattle Mariners. He is the first player in Twins history to wear No. 61.

According to Twins manager Ron Gardenhire, "He has a good smile in his face and comes to play every day. You can play anywhere you put him, outfield, infield, so it will be fine to have him up there." Watkins played nine games, with his major league debut being as pinch-hitter, August 10 against the Los Angeles Angels. He started the remaining eight games he appeared in, all at third base (he shifted to shortstop for the last two innings of one game). His first hit was a single off Jarrod Washburn on August 15 at Seattle. He had ten hits in 28 at-bats, all of them singles. He scored two runs; his first on a Torii Hunter grand slam. His Major League journey ended on August 22 when he suffered what was thought to be a lower abdominal muscle strain but was later determined to be a torn groin muscle.

== Coaching ==
=== Minnesota Twins ===
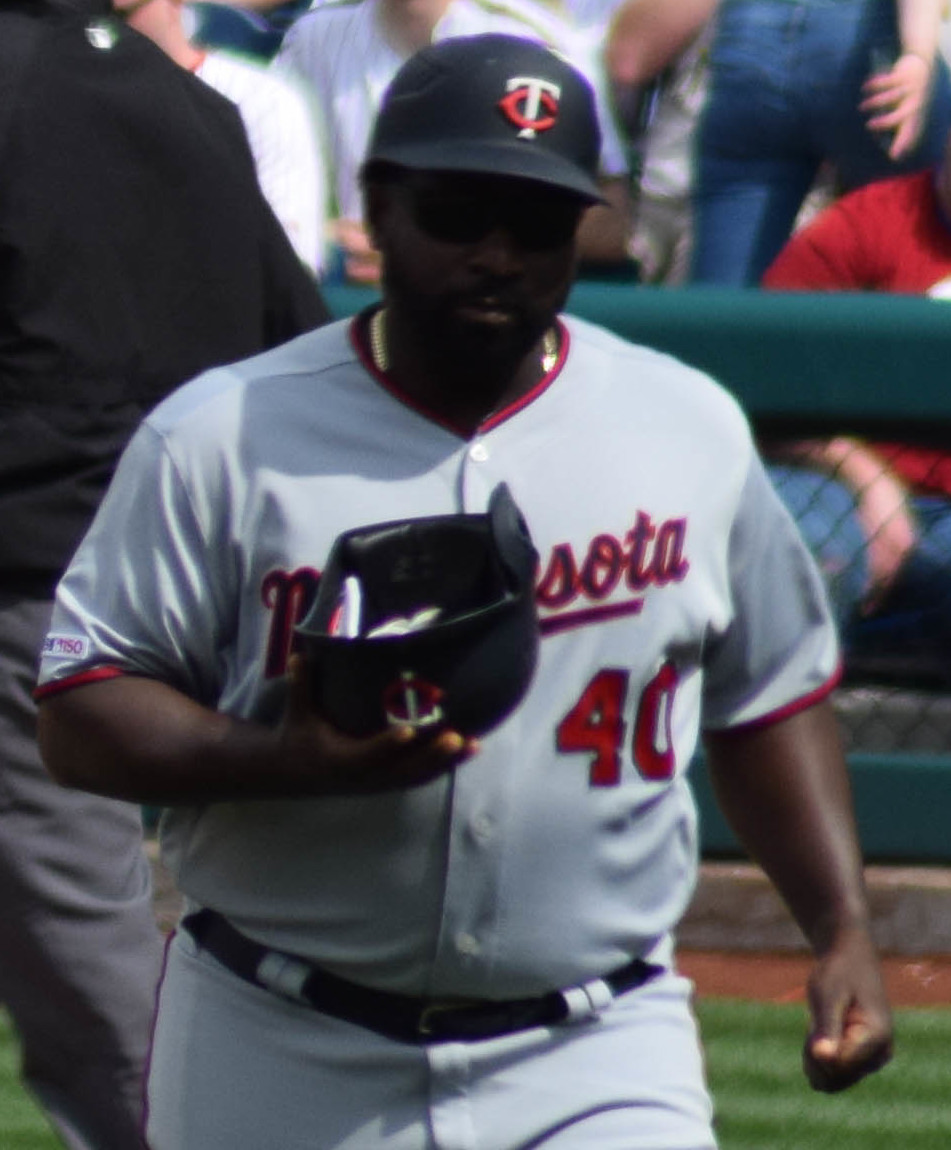
Tommy Waltkins as the first base coach for the Minnesota Twins during a game against the Philadelphia Phillies at Citizens Bank Park in Philadelphia, PA in 2019. (Cropped out Max Kepler)

Watkins spent all of 2008 with Rochester, where he batted .219 with one home run and 18 RBIs in 76 games. He became a free agent at the end of the season, and in January 2009, he re-signed with the Twins. Watkins was batting .254 at Rochester when he accepted a coaching job in the Twins organization. He helped coach the Gulf Coast League Twins, managed by Jake Mauer, and Class A Fort Myers during home games for the remainder of the season, and in 2010, accepted a position as Batting Coach with the Midwest League's Beloit Snappers. With the transfer from Beloit Snappers to the Cedar Rapids Kernels, batting coach Tommy Watkins continued his tenure with the Twins Organization.

After the 2018 season, the Twins named Watkins their major league first base coach.

Watkins served as the third base coach for the Twins in 2025.

=== Atlanta Braves ===
In November 2025, Watkins was announced as the third base coach for the Atlanta Braves.
