= Riverdale High School (Florida) =

Coordinates: 26.7061801°N 81.7242488°W

Location
- 2600 Buckingham Road; Fort Myers, Florida 33905; United States

Information
- Type: Public
- Motto: "Success is a choice"
- School district: Lee County School District
- Principal: 2016-2025 Scott Cook 2025-present interim principal Julie Powell
- Staff: 64.30 (FTE)
- Grades: 9-12
- Enrollment: 1,870 (2023-2024)
- Student to teacher ratio: 29.08
- Colors: Garnet and gold
- Mascot: Raider Man
- Nickname: Raiders
- Website: http://rdh.leeschools.net/

Riverdale High School, located in Fort Myers, Florida, United States, is one of the many high schools in Lee County.

The first two years of Riverdale began at the present-day site of Dunbar High School. Riverdale was located in this area for approximately two years while the current site was still in construction. Jack Hogg was the principal for the first two years. In the 1972–1973 school year, the school moved to its present-day location and the principal became Mike Prymas. The current principal is Scott Cook.

Riverdale High School offers the International Baccalaureate program, Advanced Placement, dual enrollment, vocational, honors and general education classes.

In 2019, Riverdale High School had the second highest enrollment of all high schools in the Lee County School District.

== Notable alumni ==
- Ross Chastain (Class of 2011) - NASCAR driver competing full-time in the NASCAR Cup Series in the No. 1 car for Trackhouse Racing.
- Terrence Cody (Class of 2006) - Former nose tackle for the Baltimore Ravens.
- Mindy McCready (Class of 1991) - American Country Music Singer.
- Tommy Watkins (Class of 1998) - Former third baseman and current third baseman coach for the Minnesota Twins.

== Lords of Chaos ==
Several Riverdale High students attracted national notoriety as members of a self-styled teen militia called the Lords of Chaos. They went on a crime spree culminating in the murder of Mark Schwebes, Riverdale High School's band director, on April 30, 1996.
