= Terrence Cody =

American football player (born 1988)

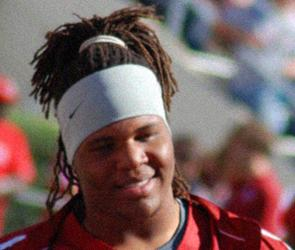
- Cody in 2008

No. 62
- Position: Defensive tackle

Personal information
- Born: June 28, 1988 (age 38); Fort Myers, Florida, U.S.
- Listed height: 6 ft 4 in (1.93 m)
- Listed weight: 345 lb (156 kg)

Career information
- High school: Riverdale (Fort Myers)
- College: Mississippi Gulf Coast CC (2006–2007); Alabama (2008–2009)
- NFL draft: 2010: 2nd round, 57th overall pick

Career history
- Baltimore Ravens (2010–2014)

Awards and highlights
- Super Bowl champion (XLVII); BCS national champion (2010); 2× Consensus All-American (2008, 2009); 2× First-team All-SEC (2008, 2009); First-team Junior College All-American (2007)

Career NFL statistics
- Total tackles: 87
- Stats at Pro Football Reference

Terrence Bernard Cody, Jr. (born June 28, 1988) is an American former professional football player who was a defensive tackle in the National Football League (NFL). He played college football for the Alabama Crimson Tide. He was selected by the Baltimore Ravens in the second round of the 2010 NFL draft and played five seasons in the NFL.

A native of Florida, Cody spent two seasons at Mississippi Gulf Coast Community College, where he helped the Bulldogs to an unbeaten season in 2007. Surprisingly nimble even at a peak weight of more than 400 pounds (180 kg), Cody drew the attention of major Division I programs. He finished his collegiate career at Alabama, where he earned consensus All-American honors twice while anchoring one of college football's best defenses during the 2008 and 2009 seasons. During his senior season with the Alabama Crimson Tide in 2009, he helped lead the Tide to an undefeated 14–0 season including a victory in the 2010 BCS National Championship Game.

Cody is one of the few football players ever to win a championship at Junior College, NCAA Division I College, and in the NFL.

== Early life ==
Cody was born in Fort Myers, Florida on June 28, 1988. As a child, he wore size-10 shoes by the age of eight and was never eligible for the Pop Warner youth leagues because he was always over the weight limit. He attended Riverdale High School in Fort Myers. Already 6 ft 2 in (1.88 m) and 275 lb (125 kg) as a ninth-grader, Cody began playing high school football and displayed a high degree of athleticism, causing his high school coach, Scott Jones, to predict "he could be making $2 million playing in the NFL" at some point. He played only two years of varsity football: as a freshman and then as a senior. He struggled academically, had to help take care of his seven younger siblings, and ended up "running with the wrong crowd".

After sitting out his sophomore and junior seasons, Cody dominated as a senior. In a game against North Fort Myers, he had a memorable collision with star running back Noel Devine. "Terrence hit and spun Noel Devine so hard that [Devine] was on the sideline puking," coach Jones said.

He also participated in track and field, competing in the throwing events. He got top-throws of 14.63 meters in the shot put and 46.32 meters in the discus throw.

Cody was not ranked among the nation's elite football prospects in 2006 by any recruiting service. Nonetheless, he was offered athletic scholarships by the University of Miami and the University of South Florida, but could not qualify academically. Cody eventually signed with Mississippi Gulf Coast Community College.

== College career ==
=== Mississippi Gulf Coast Community College ===
Cody played two seasons at Mississippi Gulf Coast Community College in Perkinston, Mississippi as a defensive tackle. As a freshman, he recorded 48 tackles with 2.5 sacks and an interception. In his sophomore year, he added 31 tackles and 3.5 sacks while anchoring a Bulldog defense that ranked number one in the state in rushing defense and total defense. Mississippi Gulf Coast finished the season with a 12–0 season record and a NJCAA Co-National Championship. Cody was named to the NJCAA All-American first team.

Despite his dominance, he had trouble drawing scholarship offers, as his weight of 410 pounds (190 kg) scared off many teams. "A lot of people are just wary of guys that big," Mississippi Gulf Coast coach Steve Campbell said. "You know when people say that if things seem too good to be true that they usually are. A big guy like that who's that athletic, you just don't believe what you're seeing." Particularly noted for his lower body strength, Cody had a squat max of 660 pounds (300 kg) in junior college.

However, after Cody had his weight down to 385 lb (175 kg), a number of schools offered him scholarships, including Tennessee, Ole Miss, and Florida State. He was heavily recruited particularly by Alabama Crimson Tide head coach Nick Saban, who was in need of a true nose tackle for his 3–4 defense. Cody recalls Saban telling him, "We need a body like yours in the middle, to stop the run, to change the rhythm of the game."

Considered a three-star recruit by 247Sports.com, Cody was listed as the No. 39 junior college prospect in 2008.

Cody committed to the Crimson Tide on November 29, 2007.

=== University of Alabama ===
==== 2008 season ====
"Offenses have to assign two blockers to [Cody] and he routinely clogs up the middle anyway. He forces running backs into other tacklers' arms and opens up rushing lanes for teammates."

— Yahoo! Sports' columnist Dan Wetzel.

Cody made an immediate impact for the Crimson Tide defensive line, recording four tackles—one for loss—in a 34–10 rout of the Clemson Tigers. He and the rest of the defense also held the Tigers, which included running backs James Davis and C. J. Spiller, to zero net rushing yards. With his presence in the middle of the Crimson Tide defensive line, Cody earned himself the nickname of "Mount Cody". By mid-season he was already considered the No. 1 nose tackle prospect for the 2009 NFL draft by league scouts.

Against Arkansas, Cody dominated Razorbacks center Jonathan Luigs—the 2007 Rimington Trophy winner—and helped the Crimson Tide to a 49–14 win. In a memorable play on a fourth-and-goal from the 1-yard line late in the first half, Cody blasted past Luigs and left guard Wade Grayson to grab running back Michael Smith before he could reach the end zone. In Alabama's rout over Georgia at Sanford Stadium, Cody was instrumental in holding Doak Walker award candidate Knowshon Moreno to just 34 yards rushing. In the seventh game of the season against Ole Miss, he received a knee injury during the third quarter which sidelined him for two weeks.

In the annual Iron Bowl versus rival Auburn, Cody and teammate Bobby Greenwood sacked quarterback Kodi Burns, giving Cody his first half-sack of the season. He also recovered a fumble, which set up an Alabama touchdown. In the 2008 SEC Championship Game versus Florida, Cody recorded three tackles in a 31–20 loss. In the loss, the Crimson Tide allowed 142 yards rushing—the second most in the 2008 season. In the season finale, he recorded one assisted tackle, while holding the Utah Utes to 13 yards rushing. However, Alabama went on to lose the game 31–17, finishing the season 12–2.

"Cody's statistics may not blow you away; [...b]ut he still can be the most dominant player on the field because of the double- and triple-teams opposing teams give him."

— NY Daily News columnist Dick Weiss.

Alabama's rush defense considerably improved in 2008. After giving up 128.4 rushing yards a game in 2007, the Crimson Tide only allowed 78.8 yards per game in 2008. "As far as one guy who has changed our team more than any, you'd have to go with Terrence," offensive lineman Mike Johnson said. Cody was subsequently given the team's Defensive Achievement Award for a newcomer who has played a critical role in the effectiveness of his unit.

Despite being commonly regarded as a top prospect, Cody decided to pass on from the 2009 NFL draft. On Christmas Day of 2008, an "announcement" on his Facebook page said that he was leaving early, but turned out to be a joke by his girlfriend.

==== 2009 season ====
Prior to the 2009 season Cody dropped about 10 pounds and worked on his conditioning, hoping to keep himself in the game on third-down passing situations. He was often replaced by Josh Chapman on passing downs in 2008. Nick Saban stated Cody needed to reduce his weight to 340 pounds (150 kg) in order to become an every-down player and pass-rusher; he reported for fall practice at 354 pounds (161 kg), set a goal to reach 345 pounds (156 kg) by the season opener, and eventually dropped his weight to 349 pounds (158 kg). Only a couple of days before the first game, Cody and a few of his teammates were sidelined with flu-like symptoms. Cody returned after a three-day absence.

Cody was named to the 2009 Lombardi Award, Lott Trophy, and Outland Trophy pre-season watch lists. Rivals.com ranked him as the No. 1 defensive tackle in college football in 2009. On October 14, 2009, Cody and teammate Rolando McClain were announced as two of the twelve finalists for the 2009 Lombardi Award. Cody was also named to The Sporting News and CBS Sports midseason college football All-American teams.

In a game against Tennessee on October 24, Cody blocked his first two field goals of his career, including a 44-yard attempt in the game's final seconds, to secure Alabama's 12–10 win. According to Yahoo! Sports' national columnist Dan Wetzel, Cody earned himself Heisman Trophy consideration with his performance against the Volunteers. A couple of weeks later, Mike Hiserman of the Los Angeles Times also called for Heisman consideration for Cody, describing him as "the best player on what might be college football's top defense."

"Other than [Ndamukong] Suh, there might not be another player in college football who disrupts a game plan the way Cody does. [... He] is a wall-to-wall space occupier. It takes two, sometimes three, offensive linemen to keep him from pushing the pile into the backfield."

— L.A. Times columnist Chris Dufresne.

On November 10, Cody was named one of four finalists for the Lombardi Award, alongside Jerry Hughes, Gerald McCoy, and Ndamukong Suh. He was the seventh Crimson Tide player to be named a finalist and the second in a row, joining offensive tackle Andre Smith, who was a finalist for the award in 2008. Former All-American linebacker Cornelius Bennett was the only Alabama player to win the Lombardi Award, capturing the honor in 1986. In the end, Nebraska's Ndamukong Suh won the award. On November 19, Cody joined Pat Angerer, Eric Berry, Jerry Hughes, and Ndamukong Suh as the five finalists for the 2009 Nagurski Trophy, but was again beat out by Suh for the award. On November 23, Cody, Brandon Spikes and Suh were announced as the three finalists for the 2009 Bednarik Award, which was eventually won by Suh as well.

In his two seasons at Alabama, Cody helped the Crimson Tide to lead the Southeastern Conference in rushing defense, allowing opponents a rushing average of only 78.8 and 78.1 yards per game in 2008 and 2009, respectively. No individual player reached the 100-yard rushing mark against the Crimson Tide in those two seasons; Anthony Dixon of Mississippi State came closest with 81 yards in 2009. Cody's presence improved Alabama's pass rush despite his not being an effective pass rusher himself. Wrote Michael Casagrande: "The power that comes with his size typically forces opposing lines to focus two players on blocking him, thus creating favorable rushing lanes for unblocked linebackers."

Prior to the 2010 BCS National Championship Game, Cody drew awestruck praise from Texas players and coaches. "They call him Mount Cody. Mount Cody is for a reason. He plays like he's 450 pounds. He can move like he's Sergio Kindle," said Longhorns guard Charlie Tanner. Alabama's defense held Texas to 81 yards rushing—more than 70 yards below their season average—on 28 attempts, and helped the Crimson Tide to their first national title since 1992.

Along with Crimson Tide teammates Javier Arenas, Mike Johnson, Leigh Tiffin, and Colin Peek, Cody participated in the 2010 Senior Bowl on January 30, 2010. In the Senior Bowl weigh-in at the Mobile Convention Center, Cody tipped the scales at 370 pounds, which hurt his draft status according to NFL Network draft analyst Mike Mayock.

=== College awards and honors ===
- 2007 Junior College First Team All-American
- 2008 AP All-SEC First Team
- 2008 AP All-American
- 2008 AFCA All-American
- 2008 CBS All-American
- 2008 FWAA All-American
- 2008 Rivals.com All-American
- 2008 Sporting News All-American
- 2008 Sports Illustrated All-American
- 2008 Walter Camp All-American Second Team
- 2009 Preseason 1st team All-American
- 2009 Sporting News Midseason All-American
- 2009 CBS Sports Midseason All-American
- 2009 Bednarik Award finalist
- 2009 Lombardi Award finalist
- 2009 Nagurski Trophy finalist
- 2009 AP All-SEC First Team (unanimous selection)
- 2009 CBS Sports All-American
- 2009 Walter Camp All-American
- 2009 FWAA All-American
- 2009 Scout.com All-American 1st team
- 2009 AP All-American 1st team
- 2009 SEC Championship
- 2010 BCS National Championship

=== College career statistics ===
Year	GP–GS	Tackles				Sacks	Pass Defense				Fumbles		Blocked
Year	GP–GS	Solo	Ast	Total	Loss–Yards	No–Yards	Int–Yards	BU	PD	QBH	Rcv–Yards	FF	Kick
2008	11–11	7	16	23	4.5–14	0.5–5	0–0	0	0	2	2–0	1	0
2009	14–14	12	16	28	6.0–11	0–0	0–0	1	1	3	0–0	0	2
Total		19	32	51	10.5–25	0.5–5	0–0	1	1	5	2–0	1	2

== Professional career ==
=== 2010 NFL draft ===
"Regardless of questions on weight or build, when you look for that 3–4 centerpiece, a guy who has the physical traits of a block-occupying clogger who will let your linebackers play with freedom, Cody's that type of guy."

— ESPN' analyst Mel Kiper, Jr.

Frequently drawing comparisons to Ted Washington and Shaun Rogers, Cody was considered one of the rare two-gap defensive tackles that NFL teams covet for their 3–4 type defenses. Many NFL experts therefore projected Cody to be selected in the first-round of the 2010 NFL draft. One of the teams interested in Cody was rumored to be his near-hometown Miami Dolphins, who lost their veteran defensive tackle Jason Ferguson to injury during the 2009 season.

Some pro scouts, however, were concerned about Cody's weight and said he needed to reduce it to 340 pounds (154 kg) in order to be an effective NFL player. They questioned whether he had the stamina to be a three-down player, or the quickness to be an effective pass rusher, at his college weight of about 360 pounds (163 kg). ESPN's K. C. Joyner analyzed Cody's relative playing time in a four-game SEC stretch in October 2009 (at Kentucky, at Mississippi, vs. South Carolina, vs. Tennessee), and found that Cody was in the Alabama defensive lineup on only 122 of 281 plays. Joyner also discovered that during that stretch Cody drew an impressively high amount of double-teams: 63.6 percent, compared to NFL player Albert Haynesworth's 2007 double-team mark of 51.3 percent.

At the 2010 Senior Bowl, Cody disappointed a lot of NFL scouts when he weighed in at 370 pounds (168 kg), 16 pounds (7 kg) above his official weight according to the 2009 Alabama media guide. In the game, however, Cody "moved pretty well for a 370-pound behemoth" and used "his hands well to create a little space to get penetration". He finished with 1.5 tackles for loss. Cody worked out at API in Pensacola, Florida, along with Sam Bradford, Jason Worilds, and former Alabama teammates Mike Johnson and Roy Upchurch. He made pre-draft visits to the Baltimore Ravens, New York Jets, San Diego Chargers, and Kansas City Chiefs.

At the NFL Combine, Cody weighed in at 354 pounds (161 kg), making him the heaviest combine participant since Aaron Gibson in 1999. He had managed to shed some weight since the Senior Bowl, but according to Mike Mayock he was still not worthy of a first-round pick. Cody ran a 5.71 sec 40-yard dash, the slowest by an eventually drafted defensive tackle since Corey Swinson, a seventh round pick in the 1995 NFL draft. Cody was selected in the second round (57th overall) by the Baltimore Ravens. He was the highest picked Alabama Crimson Tide defensive tackle since Cornelius Griffin was selected 42nd overall by the New York Giants in the 2000 NFL draft.

Pre-draft measurables
Height	Weight	Arm length	Hand span	40-yard dash	10-yard split	20-yard split	20-yard shuttle	Three-cone drill	Vertical jump	Broad jump	Bench press
6 ft 3 5/8 in (1.92 m)	354 lb (161 kg)	34 1/4 in (0.87 m)	11 in (0.28 m)	5.71 s	1.96 s	3.21 s	5.03 s	8.19 s	22 in (0.56 m)	7 ft 9 in (2.36 m)	22 reps
All values from Alabama Pro Day, except for measurables, 40 time, 20ss and 3-cone, which are from NFL combine

=== Baltimore Ravens ===
At Baltimore, Cody was projected to strengthen a Ravens defense that allowed the fewest rushing yards per carry (3.4) of any NFL team in 2009 and had a streak of 39 consecutive games without allowing a 100-yard rusher—broken when Cincinnati's Cedric Benson rushed for 120 yards on October 11, 2009. Regarded by Ravens director of player personnel Eric DeCosta as a first-round prospect "from an ability standpoint", Cody competed against Kelly Gregg for the starting defensive tackle spot in 2010. The combination of Cody and 345-pound defensive tackle Haloti Ngata gave Baltimore the AFC North's heaviest interior line, reminiscent of the Sam Adams and Tony Siragusa tandem on the 2000–2001 Ravens teams.

Cody signed a four-year, $3.385 million (equivalent to $5 million in 2025) maximum value contract with the Ravens on July 26, 2010. In training camp at McDaniel College, Cody—along with veteran cornerback Walt Harris—failed their conditioning test for the Ravens, and were thus placed on the physically unable to perform (PUP) list. He passed the conditioning test on his third try, allowing him to go to training camp for the Ravens.

In his professional debut, a preseason game against the Carolina Panthers, Cody had a solid performance, finishing with five tackles (four solo). His most impressive play came in the first half, when he tackled DeAngelo Williams single-armed for a loss while holding off Panthers center Ryan Kalil with the other. On November 21, he made his first official start, debuting against the Carolina Panthers at Bank of America Stadium. Unlike his preseason performance, he was criticized for his poor performance from fans. During a play, the Panthers offensive lineman pushed Cody out of the way, allowing Mike Goodson to have a 45-yard run. Cody finished the game without any tackles, as the Ravens defense allowed 120 rushing yards. As a rookie in 2010, Cody played 13 games with 13 tackles.

In the 2011 off-season, the team parted ways with their long-time starting defensive tackle Kelly Gregg. Cody spent the entire 2011 season as a full-time starter, registering 34 tackles and helping lead the Ravens defense to be ranked 2nd in the league against the run, ranked 3rd overall. In 2011, Cody eventually started all 16 games as the 3–4 type defensive tackle and finished the year with 39 tackles and 1 pass defended.

With the acquiring of Ma'ake Kemoeatu in the off-season, Cody's playing time was limited after a rough preseason and the Ravens using a 3–4 type defense. In 15 games (3 starts) of 2012, Cody made 25 tackles with 3 passes defended. With the Ravens clinching an AFC North title on a 10–6 record, the team eventually won Super Bowl XLVII 34–31 against the San Francisco 49ers, giving Cody his first NFL championship title.

Despite Kemoeatu being released following the Super Bowl victory, Haloti Ngata took over as the starting defensive tackle, again limiting Cody's playing time. In 2013, Cody appeared in 12 games with 1 start making 15 tackles.

On April 4, 2014, Cody was re-signed by the Ravens. He only appeared in one game in the 2014 season and did not record a single statistic that year.

On January 23, 2015, the Ravens announced they had released Cody.

=== NFL statistics ===
Year	Team	GP	COMB	TOTAL	AST	SACK	FF	FR	FR YDS	INT	IR YDS	AVG IR	LNG	TD	PD
2010	BAL	13	13	5	8	0.0	0	0	0	0	0	0	0	0	0
2011	BAL	16	34	21	13	0.0	0	0	0	0	0	0	0	0	1
2012	BAL	15	25	12	13	0.0	0	0	0	0	0	0	0	0	1
2013	BAL	12	15	7	8	0.0	0	0	0	0	0	0	0	0	0
2014	BAL	1	0	0	0	0.0	0	0	0	0	0	0	0	0	0
Career		57	87	45	42	0.0	0	0	0	0	0	0	0	0	2

== Legal troubles ==
=== Animal cruelty ===
On February 2, 2015, Cody was indicted on animal cruelty and drug charges by a Baltimore County grand jury. The indictment included 15 charges: Two counts of aggravated animal cruelty involving a dog, five counts of animal abuse or neglect involving the same dog, one count of illegal possession of an alligator, five counts of animal abuse or neglect involving the alligator, one count of possession with intent to use the drug paraphernalia, and one count of possession of marijuana. Cody's agent, Peter Schaffer, denied his client's guilt and said that Cody's dog died of worms and that there was no animal cruelty. The investigating veterinarian said the dog was neglected and starved to death.

On November 16, 2015, Cody was found not guilty of two felony counts of aggravated animal cruelty but he was convicted of five other counts related to failing to provide care for his dog, Taz. He was also found guilty of illegally possessing an alligator and of neglecting the alligator, and also two misdemeanor drug charges related to marijuana and paraphernalia that police found in his former home. The alligator was confiscated, and relocated to a sanctuary. Prosecuting state attorney Adam Lippe alleged Taz suffered more than four weeks of starvation in a cage in Cody's garage.

On January 4, 2016, Cody's sentencing was delayed because a psychological evaluation of Cody was being completed at the time.

On March 24, 2016, Cody was sentenced to nine months in jail for his role in the dog's starvation death and neglecting the illegal alligator. His girlfriend was acquitted of the aggravated animal cruelty, drug and alligator charges but found guilty of five counts in connection with neglecting Taz.

== Personal life ==
By his own description of his early family life, Cody grew up poor. His mother worked two jobs, as a traveling nurse and a bus driver, to care for him and his seven younger siblings. His parents were not married, but his father, a construction worker, was a big part of his life until he died in a car accident when Cody was 11. At the end of his junior year of high school, Cody moved in with the family of a high school teammate.

In his two years at Alabama, Cody became the Tide's most popular player because of his outsized personality and body. Former Alabama quarterback Greg McElroy said of Cody: "He's an enjoyable person to have on our team, have in the locker room, and (he) has great charisma. He has fun when he plays the game, and that's a big reason why he's so popular."
