= Tim Ward (racing driver) =

American racing driver

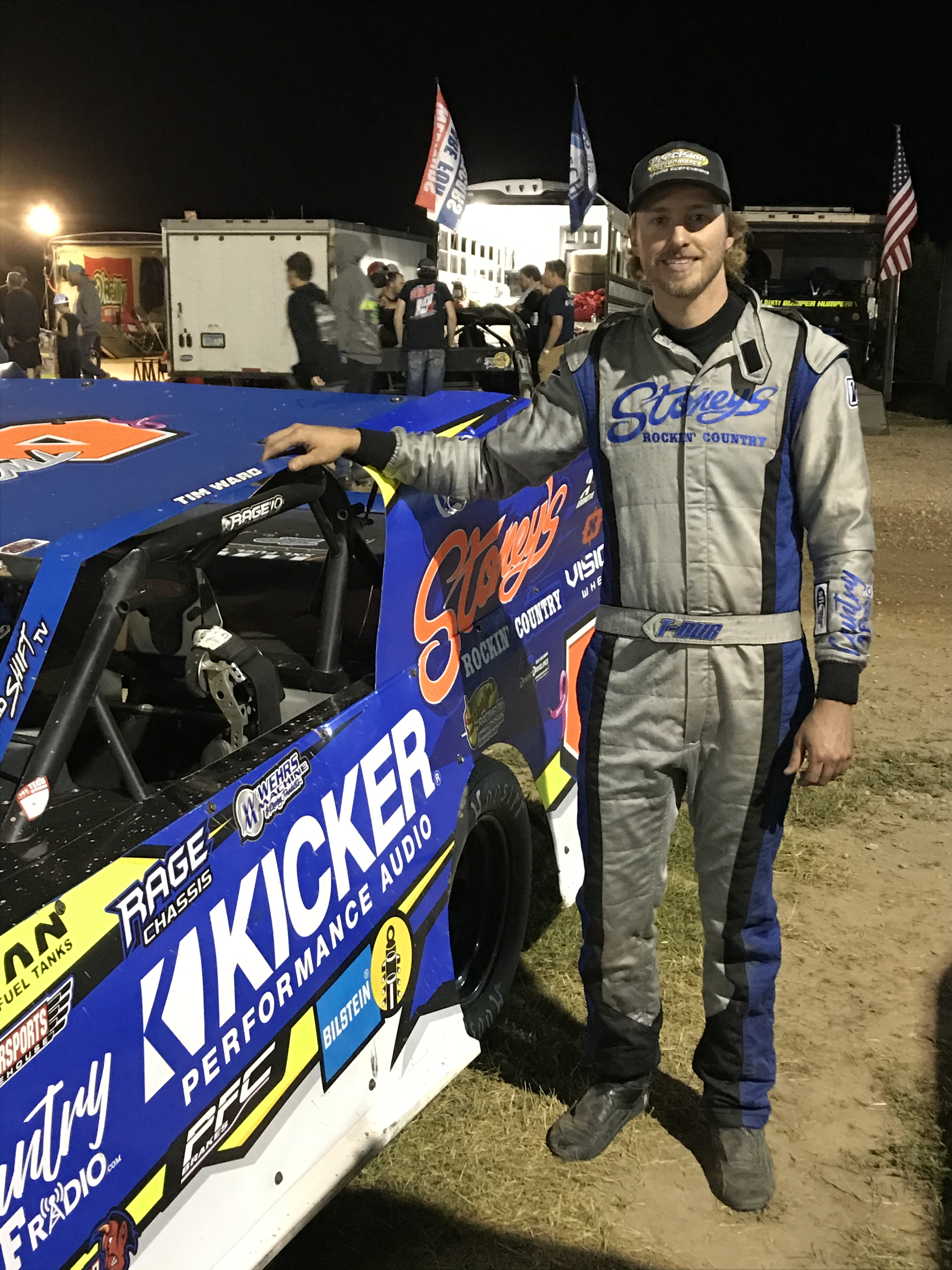
- Ward at 141 Speedway in 2020
- Born: February 23, 1994 (age 32); Harcourt, Iowa, U.S.
- Awards: 2008 DIRTcar Modified Series Rookie of the Year

NASCAR FedEx Freight Truck Series career
- 1 race run over 1 year
- 2019 position: 75th
- Best finish: 75th (2019)
- First race: 2019 Eldora Dirt Derby (Eldora)
Wins	Top tens	Poles
0	0	0
- Statistics up to date as of November 18, 2019.

Tim Ward (born February 23, 1994) is an American professional dirt track and stock car racing driver. Ward predominantly competes in dirt modified competition.

== Racing career ==
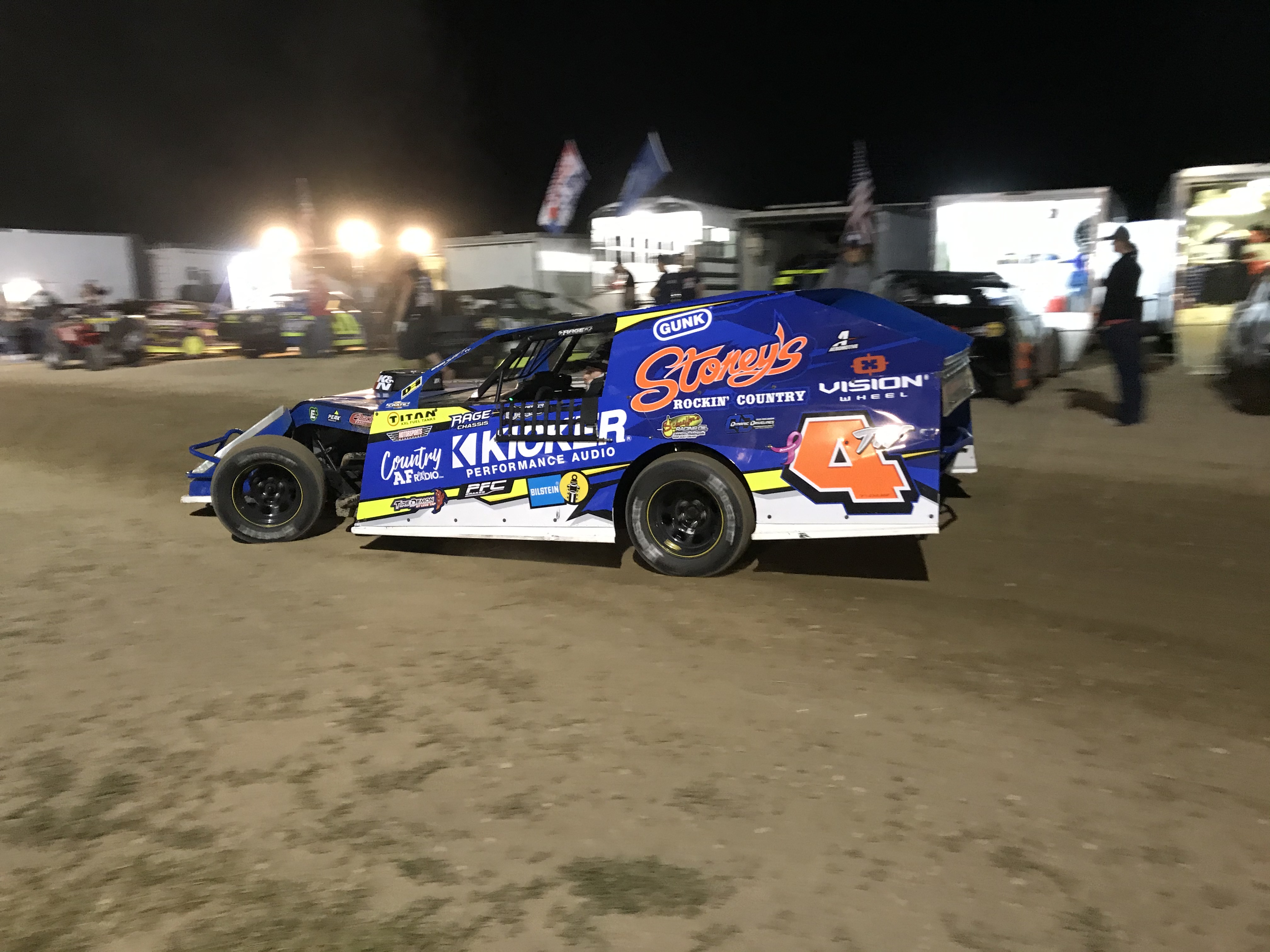
Ward's 2020 IMCA Modified car.

Ward won the DIRTcar Modified Series Rookie of the Year award in 2008. In 2018, Ward made his NASCAR K&N Pro Series West debut in the 2018 Star Nursery 100 at the Las Vegas Motor Speedway Dirt Track. He placed fourth in his heat race and fourteenth place in the main event. He later competed in the 2019 Eldora Dirt Derby, where he placed fifth in his heat race and sixteenth in the main event.

== Motorsports career results ==
=== NASCAR ===
(key) (Bold – Pole position awarded by qualifying time. Italics – Pole position earned by points standings or practice time. * – Most laps led.)

==== Gander Outdoors Truck Series ====
NASCAR Gander Outdoors Truck Series results
Year	Team	No.	Make	1	2	3	4	5	6	7	8	9	10	11	12	13	14	15	16	17	18	19	20	21	22	23	NGOTC	Pts	Ref
2019	Kart Idaho Racing	08	Toyota	DAY	ATL	LVS	MAR	TEX	DOV	KAN	CLT	TEX	IOW	GTW	CHI	KEN	POC	ELD; 16	MCH	BRI	MSP	LVS	TAL	MAR	PHO	HOM	75th	21	

==== K&N Pro Series West ====
NASCAR K&N Pro Series West results
Year	Team	No.	Make	1	2	3	4	5	6	7	8	9	10	11	12	13	14	15	NKNPSWC	Pts	Ref
2018	Patriot Motorsports Group	34	Ford	KCR	TUS	TUS	OSS	CNS	SON	DCS	SPO	IOW	EVG	GTW	LVS; 14	MER	AAS	KCR	48th	30	

^{*} Season still in progress
^{1} Ineligible for series points
