= Colt Gilliam =

American racing driver

- Born: Colt C. Gilliam; December 27, 1989 (age 36); Rock Hill, South Carolina, U.S.

NASCAR FedEx Freight Truck Series career
- 1 race run over 1 year
- 2019 position: 87th
- Best finish: 87th (2019)
- First race: 2019 Eldora Dirt Derby (Eldora)
Wins	Top tens	Poles
0	0	0
- Statistics up to date as of November 18, 2019.

Colt C. Gilliam (born December 27, 1989) is an American professional stock car racing driver. Gilliam competes in the super stock division at Carolina Speedway in Gastonia, North Carolina. He made his NASCAR Gander Outdoors Truck Series debut in the 2019 Eldora Dirt Derby driving the No. 8 Chevrolet Silverado for NEMCO Motorsports.

== Motorsports career results ==
=== NASCAR ===
(key) (Bold – Pole position awarded by qualifying time. Italics – Pole position earned by points standings or practice time. * – Most laps led.)

==== Gander Outdoors Truck Series ====
NASCAR Gander Outdoors Truck Series results
Year	Team	No.	Make	1	2	3	4	5	6	7	8	9	10	11	12	13	14	15	16	17	18	19	20	21	22	23	NGOTC	Pts	Ref
2019	NEMCO Motorsports	8	Chevy	DAY	ATL	LVS	MAR	TEX	DOV	KAN	CLT	TEX	IOW	GTW	CHI	KEN	POC	ELD; 27	MCH	BRI	MSP	LVS	TAL	MAR	PHO	HOM	87th	10	

^{*} Season still in progress
^{1} Ineligible for series points
