= Darwin Peters Jr. =

American racing driver

- Born: Darwin L. Peters Jr. November 7, 1964 (age 62); Olean, New York, U.S.

NASCAR FedEx Freight Truck Series career
- 1 race run over 1 year
- 2019 position: 76th
- Best finish: 76th (2019)
- First race: 2019 Eldora Dirt Derby (Eldora)
Wins	Top tens	Poles
0	0	0

Darwin L. Peters Jr. (born November 7, 1964) is an American professional stock car racing mechanic, crew chief, and driver. He last competed part-time in the NASCAR Gander Outdoors Truck Series, driving the No. 74 Chevrolet Silverado for Lou Goss Racing.

== Racing career ==
Peters has worked for various NASCAR teams in technical roles. In 2017, working at TJL Motorsports, he served as Mike Harmon's crew chief for the Truck Series race at Atlanta Motor Speedway. In 2019, he was a mechanic for MBM Motorsports.

As a driver, Peters made his debut at Eldora Speedway driving the No. 74 Chevrolet Silverado for Lou Goss Racing in a partnership with Mike Harmon Racing. He started 30th after finishing fifth of seven cars in the Last Chance Qualify and finished 17th in the main event.

== Motorsports career results ==
=== NASCAR ===
(key) (Bold – Pole position awarded by qualifying time. Italics – Pole position earned by points standings or practice time. * – Most laps led.)

==== Gander Outdoors Truck Series ====
NASCAR Gander Outdoors Truck Series results
Year	Team	No.	Make	1	2	3	4	5	6	7	8	9	10	11	12	13	14	15	16	17	18	19	20	21	22	23	NGOTC	Pts	Ref
2019	Lou Goss Racing	74	Chevy	DAY	ATL	LVS	MAR	TEX	DOV	KAN	CLT	TEX	IOW	GTW	CHI	KEN	POC	ELD; 17	MCH	BRI	MSP	LVS	TAL	MAR	PHO	HOM	76th	20	
