= Landon Huffman =

American racing driver (born 1996)

- Born: Landon Durant Huffman; January 30, 1996 (age 30); Claremont, North Carolina, U.S.
- Achievements: 2015 Paramount Kia Big 10 Challenge Champion; 2022 Hickory Motor Speedway Track Champion (LMSC); 2023 Old North State Nationals Winner

NASCAR FedEx Freight Truck Series career
- 5 races run over 3 years
- 2026 position: 125th
- Best finish: 49th (2017)
- First race: 2017 UNOH 200 (Bristol)
- Last race: 2019 UNOH 200 (Bristol)
Wins	Top tens	Poles
0	0	0

YouTube information
- Channel: Landon Huffman
- Years active: 2019–present
- Genres: vlog; stock car racing
- Subscribers: 44.8 thousand
- Views: 7 million
- Last updated: November 6, 2026

Landon Durant Huffman (born January 30, 1996) is an American professional stock car racing driver and team owner. He last competed full-time in the CARS Late Model Stock Car Tour and the Virginia Triple Crown, in the No. 57 Chevrolet Camaro for Carroll Speedshop. He also competes full-time in the late model stock division at Tri-County Speedway, in the No. 75 for his own team. Huffman has previously raced in the NASCAR Craftsman Truck Series. He is the son of Robert Huffman.

== Racing career ==
=== Craftsman Truck Series ===
Huffman drove in two races in 2017. He made his Truck Series debut in Bristol, driving the No. 63 truck for MB Motorsports. There, he finished twentieth. Later that season, he returned at Martinsville, driving the No. 83 truck for MB Motorsports. He improved on his last result, finishing seventeenth on the lead lap.

On January 22, 2018, NextGen Motorsports announced that the team would like to have Huffman drive between ten and fifteen races in the 2018 NASCAR Camping World Truck Series season. However, the deal fell through.

On October 12, 2018, it was announced that Huffman joined Niece Motorsports' No. 38 truck at Martinsville.

In August 2019, Huffman replaced an injured Spencer Boyd in the No. 20 of Young's Motorsports at Eldora.

Before the 2026 season, Huffman competed in Kaulig Racing's "Race For the Seat", competing against 14 other drivers to try to win a full-season ride in the team's No. 14 truck. In July of that year, it was revealed that he will drive the No. 75 Chevrolet for Henderson Motorsports at North Wilkesboro Speedway.

=== Xfinity Series ===
On January 22, 2018, NextGen Motorsports announced that they would like to have Huffman drive for the team in five 2018 NASCAR Xfinity Series events, starting at Bristol in April. However, the deal never came to fruition.

=== Late Models ===
Huffman won the track championship at Hickory Motor Speedway (a track which his father, Robert Huffman won two championships) in 2022 for Jason Smith Racing. In 2023, Huffman partnered with High Rock Vodka and Bumgarner Propane for his own No. 75 Huffman Racing effort, which included a few wins along the way at both Hickory & Tri-County Speedway, including a win at Hickory in which his Chevrolet Camaro late model had been modified to resemble an Oldsmobile Cutlass Supreme. Additionally, Huffman was signed mid-season to drive the No. 22 Chevrolet Camaro for Nelson Motorsports in the CARS Tour Late Model Stock division. This allowed Huffman to secure his first win in the series at Tri-County Speedway.

In 2024, Huffman was slated to drive the No. 37 Chevrolet Camaro for Jimmy Mooring Racing in the CARS Tour Late Model Stock division full-time in 2024, as well as running his own No. 75 High Rock Vodka machine part-time across short tracks in located in the Carolinas, such as Tri-County Speedway, Caraway Speedway, Wake County Speedway, and Florence Motor Speedway. He started off his 2024 campaign by running the No. 98 Shamrock Motorsports sponsored by High Rock Vodka at New Smyrna Speedway for their World Series of Asphalt Stock Car Racing.

=== Spotting ===
Huffman previously was the spotter for Zane Smith and his MDM Motorsports team in the ARCA Racing Series, and Anthony Alfredo's MDM entry in the NASCAR K&N Pro Series East.

== Esports ==
In 2019, Huffman founded esports team Total Advantage, which competes in Call of Duty games and iRacing Road to Pro.

== Personal life ==
Landon's father is former NASCAR driver Robert Huffman. Robert won two track championships at Hickory Motor Speedway and five championships in the Goody's Dash Series. When he has competed in the CARS Tour, Huffman has competed against another Landon Huffman. Although they are both from North Carolina and both are sons of unrelated former NASCAR drivers Robert and Shane, they are not the same person.

Huffman has a YouTube channel where he posts videos about his racing career and his short track program, along with all of his friends who help out on his team, such as RJ Williams, Seth Brotherton, Rich Hudson, and Kenny "Guttman" Little. He currently has 27K subscribers.

In April 2021, Huffman married his high school sweetheart, Brooke.

== Motorsports career results ==
=== Stock car career summary ===
Season	Series	Team	Races	Wins	Top 5	Top 10	Points	Position
2016	CARS Late Model Stock Car Tour	Landon Huffman Racing	2	0	1	1	45	26th
2016	ARCA Racing Series	Venturini Motorsports	1	0	0	0	150	114th
2017	CARS Late Model Stock Car Tour	Landon Huffman Racing	4	0	1	2	94	23rd
2017	NASCAR Camping World Truck Series	MB Motorsports	2	0	0	0	37	49th
2018	CARS Late Model Stock Car Tour	Jason Smith	2	0	0	0	22	49th
2018	NASCAR Camping World Truck Series	Niece Motorsports	1	0	0	0	12	76th
2019	NASCAR Gander Outdoors Truck Series	Young's Motorsports	2	0	0	0	34	58th
2021	CARS Late Model Stock Car Tour	Doug Houser	1	0	0	0	13	58th
2022	ARCA Menards Series	Jeff McClure Racing	1	0	0	0	28	96th
2023	CARS Late Model Stock Car Tour	Landon Huffman Racing	1	0	0	0	299	9th
2023	CARS Late Model Stock Car Tour	Nelson Motorsports	13	1	3	6	299	9th
2024	SMART Modified Tour	Justin Hanney	2	0	0	0	54	36th
2024	CARS Late Model Stock Car Tour	Jimmy Mooring Racing	6	0	0	0	143	22nd
2024	CARS Late Model Stock Car Tour	Carroll Speedshop	3	0	0	1	143	22nd
2025	SMART Modified Tour	Justin Hanney	4	0	0	1	116	22nd
2025	CARS Late Model Stock Car Tour	Carroll Speeedshop	15	0	4	8	478	4th
2026	CARS Pro Late Model Tour	RTD Motorsports	2	0	0	0	27	60th
2026	CARS Late Model Stock Car Tour	Carroll Speedshop	12	0	0	1	373	9th
2026	CARS Late Model Stock Car Tour	Huffman Racing Team LLC	2	0	0	0	373	9th
2026	NASCAR Craftsman Truck Series	Henderson Motorsports	0	0	0	0	0	125th

=== NASCAR ===
(key) (Bold – Pole position awarded by qualifying time. Italics – Pole position earned by points standings or practice time. * – Most laps led.)

==== Craftsman Truck Series ====
NASCAR Craftsman Truck Series results
Year	Team	No.	Make	1	2	3	4	5	6	7	8	9	10	11	12	13	14	15	16	17	18	19	20	21	22	23	24	25	NCTSC	Pts	Ref
2017	MB Motorsports	63	Chevy	DAY	ATL	MAR	KAN	CLT	DOV	TEX	GTW	IOW	KEN	ELD	POC	MCH	BRI; 20	MSP	CHI	NHA	LVS	TAL							49th	37	
2017	MB Motorsports	83	Chevy																				MAR; 17	TEX	PHO	HOM			49th	37	
2018	Niece Motorsports	38	Chevy	DAY	ATL	LVS	MAR	DOV	KAN	CLT	TEX	IOW	GTW	CHI	KEN	ELD	POC	MCH	BRI	MSP	LVS	TAL	MAR; DNQ	TEX	PHO; 25	HOM			76th	12	
2019	Young's Motorsports	20	Chevy	DAY	ATL	LVS	MAR	TEX	DOV	KAN	CLT	TEX	IOW	GTW	CHI	KEN	POC	ELD; 24	MCH	BRI; 16	MSP	LVS	TAL	MAR	PHO	HOM			58th	34	
2026	Henderson Motorsports	75	Chevy	DAY	ATL	STP	DAR	ROC	BRI	TEX	GLN	DOV	CLT	NSH	MCH	COR	LRP	NWS; DNQ	IRP	RCH	NHA	BRI	KAN	CLT	PHO	TAL	MAR	HOM	125th	0	

^{*} Season still in progress
^{1} Ineligible for series points

=== ARCA Menards Series ===
(key) (Bold – Pole position awarded by qualifying time. Italics – Pole position earned by points standings or practice time. * – Most laps led.)

ARCA Menards Series results
Year	Team	No.	Make	1	2	3	4	5	6	7	8	9	10	11	12	13	14	15	16	17	18	19	20	AMSC	Pts	Ref
2016	Venturini Motorsports	15	Toyota	DAY	NSH	SLM	TAL	TOL	NJE	POC	MCH	MAD	WIN	IOW	IRP	POC	BLN; 15	ISF	DSF	SLM	CHI	KEN	KAN	114th	150	
2022	Jeff McClure Racing	44	Ford	DAY	PHO	TAL	KAN	CLT	IOW	BLN	ELK	MOH	POC	IRP	MCH	GLN	ISF	MLW	DSF	KAN	BRI	SLM; 16	TOL	96th	28	

=== CARS Late Model Stock Car Tour ===
(key) (Bold – Pole position awarded by qualifying time. Italics – Pole position earned by points standings or practice time. * – Most laps led. ** – All laps led.)

CARS Late Model Stock Car Tour results
Year	Team	No.	Make	1	2	3	4	5	6	7	8	9	10	11	12	13	14	15	16	17	CLMSCTC	Pts	Ref
2016	Landon Huffman Racing	75	Toyota	SNM	ROU	**HCY**; 5	TCM; 17	GRE	ROU	CON	MYB	HCY	SNM								26th	45	
2017	Landon Huffman Racing	75	Chevy	CON	DOM	DOM	HCY; 5	HCY; 11	BRI												23rd	94	
2017	Landon Huffman Racing	44H	Toyota							AND; 13	ROU	TCM	ROU								23rd	94	
2017	Landon Huffman Racing	37	Toyota											HCY; 9	CON	SBO					23rd	94	
2018	Jason Smith	75	Toyota	TCM; 16	MYB	ROU	HCY	BRI	ACE	CCS	KPT										49th	22	
2018	Jason Smith	75	Chevy									HCY; 28	WKS	ROU	SBO						49th	22	
2021	Doug Houser	75	Chevy	DIL	HCY	OCS	ACE	CRW	LGY	DOM	HCY; 20	MMS	TCM	FLC	WKS	SBO					58th	13	
2023	Landon Huffman Racing	75	Chevy	SNM	FLC	HCY; 20															9th	299	
2023	Nelson Motorsports	22	Toyota				ACE; 18	NWS; 21	LGY; 21	DOM; 13	CRW; 12		ACE; 8	TCM; 1	WKS; 6	AAS; 16	SBO; 6				9th	299	
2023	Nelson Motorsports	22	Chevy									HCY; 17						TCM; 3	CRW; 3		9th	299	
2024	Jimmy Mooring Racing	37	Chevy	SNM; DNQ	HCY; 15	AAS; 24*	OCS; 29	ACE; 17	TCM; 25	LGY	DOM	CRW	HCY; 11								22nd	143	
2024	Carroll Speedshop	57	Chevy											NWS; 13	ACE	WCS; 9	FLC	SBO	TCM	NWS; 15	22nd	143	
2025	Carroll Speedshop	57	Chevy	AAS; 15	WCS; 12	CDL; 3	OCS; 7	ACE; 5	NWS; 6	LGY; 13	DOM; 17	CRW; 20		AND; 2	FLC; 14	SBO; 10	TCM; 6	NWS; 20			4th	478	
2025	Carroll Speedshop	39	Chevy										HCY; 4								4th	478	
2026	Carroll Speedshop	57	Chevy	SNM; 14	WCS; 7	NSV; 17	CRW; 16	ACE; 11	LGY; 12	DOM; 20	NWS; 16		AND; 20	FLC; 24	TCM; 20						9th	373	
2026	Carroll Speedshop	37H	Chevy									HCY; 12									9th	373	
2026	Huffman Racing Team LLC	75	Chevy													NPS; 14	SBO; 14				9th	373	

=== CARS Pro Late Model Tour ===
(key)

CARS Pro Late Model Tour results
Year	Team	No.	Make	1	2	3	4	5	6	7	8	9	10	11	CPLMTC	Pts	Ref
2026	RTD Motorsports	46	N/A	SNM; 21	NSV; 36	CRW	ACE	NWS	HCY	AND	FLC	TCM	NPS	SBO	60th	27	

=== SMART Modified Tour ===
SMART Modified Tour results
Year	Car owner	No.	Make	1	2	3	4	5	6	7	8	9	10	11	12	13	14	SMTC	Pts	Ref
2024	Justin Hanney	98	N/A	FLO	CRW	SBO	TRI	ROU	HCY	FCS	CRW	JAC	CAR	CRW	DOM; 12	SBO; 27	NWS	36th	54	
2025	Justin Hanney	98	N/A	FLO	AND; 6	SBO; 11	ROU	HCY	FCS; 17	CRW	CPS	CAR	CRW	DOM	FCS	TRI; 14	NWS; Wth	22nd	116	
