= Natalie Decker =

American racing driver (born 1997)

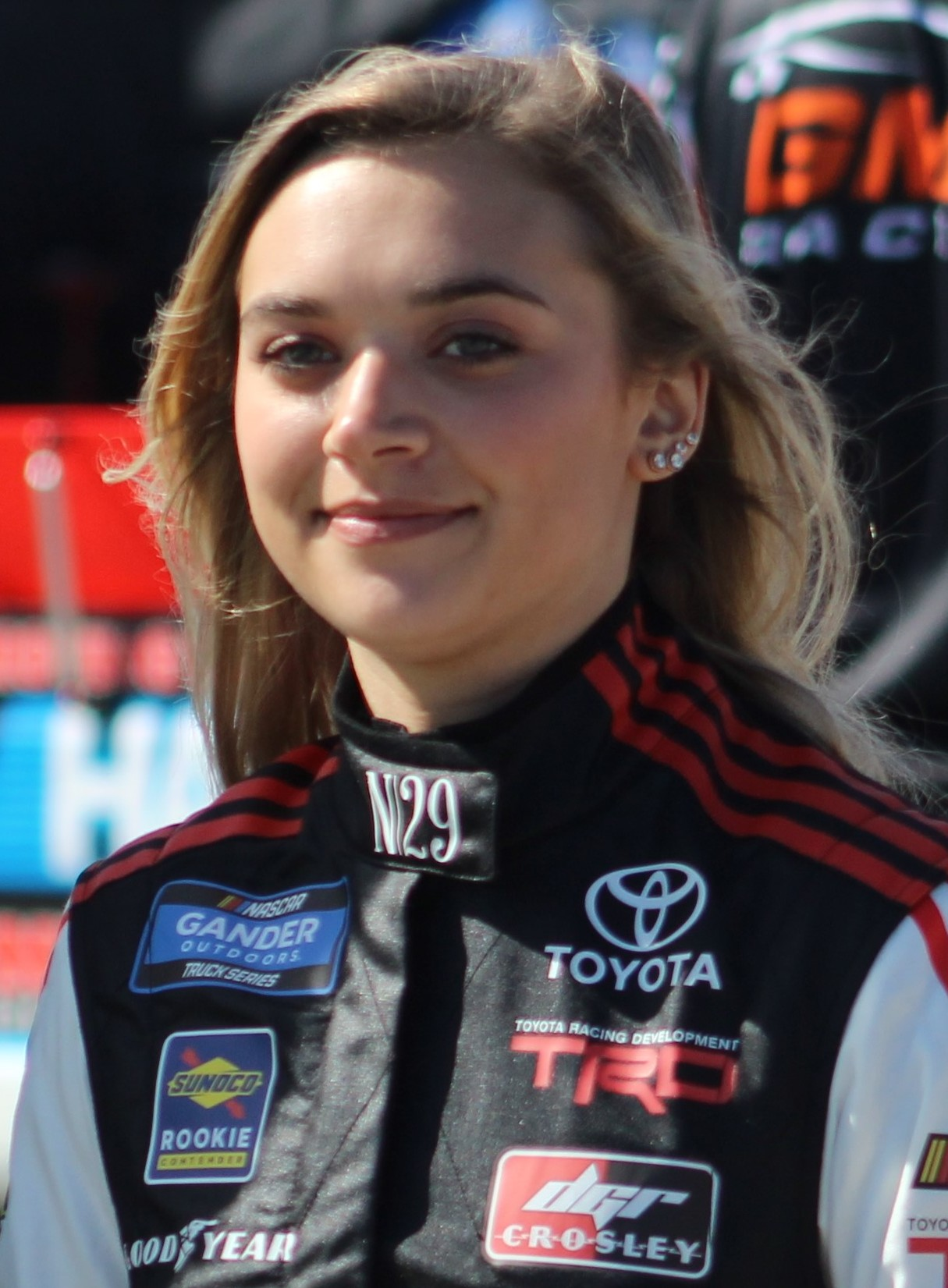
- Decker at Daytona International Speedway in 2019
- Born: Natalie Marie Decker; June 25, 1997 (age 29); Eagle River, Wisconsin, U.S.
- Achievements: Highest finishing female driver in the NASCAR Craftsman Truck Series (5th, Daytona, 2020); 2021 Trans-Am Series SGT Class ProAm Challenge Champion
- Awards: 2013 ARCA Midwest Tour Rookie of the Year

NASCAR O'Reilly Auto Parts Series career
- 18 races run over 6 years
- 2026 position: 87th
- Best finish: 53rd (2021)
- First race: 2021 Super Start Batteries 188 (Daytona RC)
- Last race: 2026 Food City 300 (Bristol)
Wins	Top tens	Poles
0	0	0

NASCAR FedEx Freight Truck Series career
- 34 races run over 3 years
- 2026 position: 86th
- Best finish: 19th (2019)
- First race: 2019 NextEra Energy 250 (Daytona)
- Last race: 2026 Ecosave 200 (Dover)
Wins	Top tens	Poles
0	1	0

ARCA Menards Series career
- 31 races run over 5 years
- Best finish: 7th (2018)
- First race: 2017 Menards 200 (Toledo)
- Last race: 2023 BRANDT 200 (Daytona)
Wins	Top tens	Poles
0	12	1

ARCA Menards Series East career
- 1 race run over 1 year
- Best finish: 47th (2019)
- First race: 2019 Zombie Auto 150 (Bristol)
Wins	Top tens	Poles
0	0	0
- Statistics up to date as of November 7, 2026.

Natalie Marie Decker Lemke (née Decker; born June 25, 1997) is an American amateur stock car racing driver. She last competed part-time in the NASCAR O'Reilly Auto Parts Series, driving the No. 35/53 Chevrolet Camaro SS/Toyota GR Supra for Joey Gase Motorsports with Scott Osteen, the No. 42 Chevrolet Camaro SS for Young's Motorsports, and the No. 47 Chevrolet Camaro SS for Mike Harmon Racing with Team Stange Racing. She was a 2015 NASCAR Drive for Diversity participant and 2016 Alan Kulwicki Driver Development competitor. She is the cousin of Claire Decker and Paige Decker who have also competed in NASCAR.

== Racing career ==
=== Local and regional racing ===
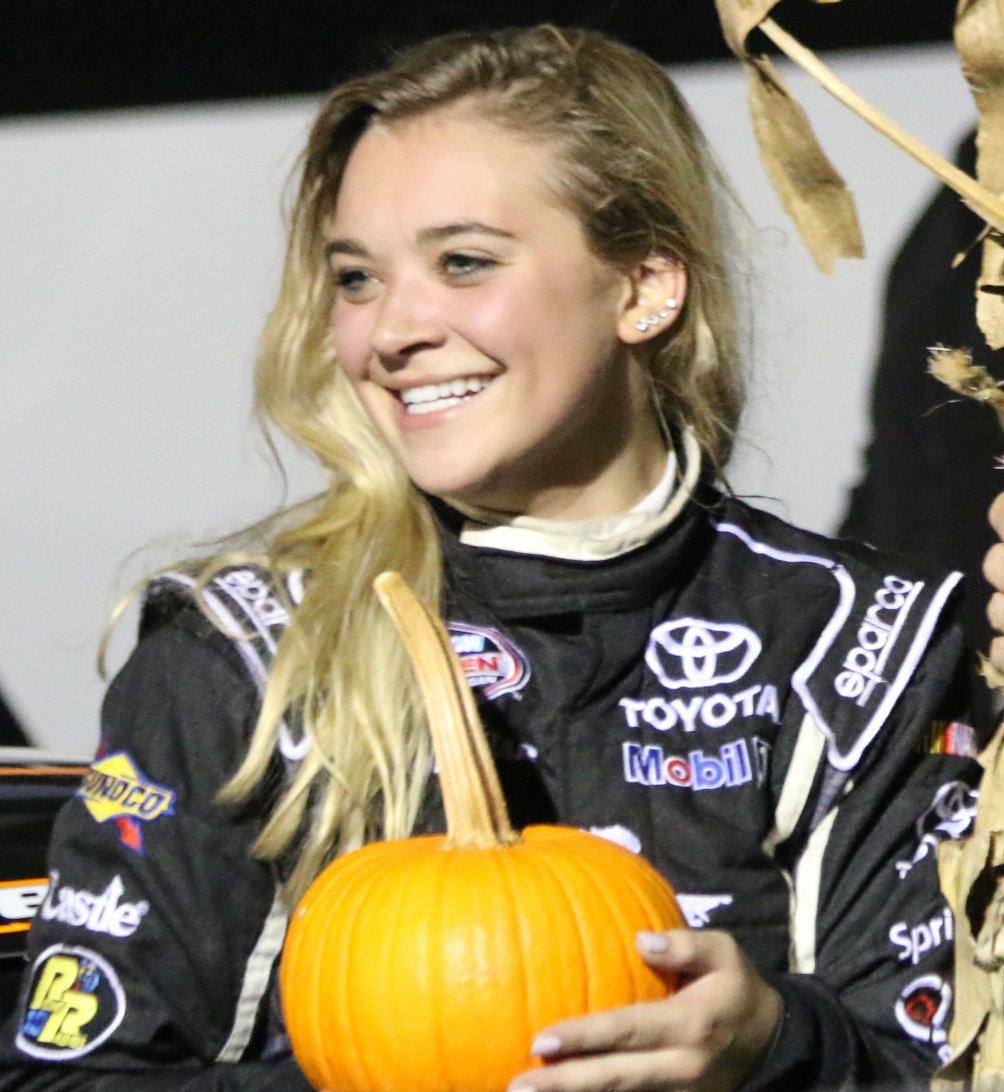
Decker at the Falloween Race at Dells Raceway Park in 2016.

Decker won four karting championships in two years. She began racing in 4-cylinder modified stock cars as a 12-year-old; in 2011, she moved up to the Super Stock class and won the 2012 class championship at Marshfield Motor Speedway. Decker began racing in the ARCA Midwest Tour She also took third that season in a three-race Midwest Truck Series at Madison International Speedway. In 2014, she won seven limited late model features and two super late model features. She was added to the Rev Racing team in 2015, as she was named to the NASCAR Drive for Diversity program.

=== NASCAR and ARCA ===
Decker was one of seven drivers to compete in the 2016 Alan Kulwicki Driver Development program; she was awarded $7,777. Decker joined her cousins Paige Decker and Claire Decker in attempting to make the field for the Alpha Energy Solutions 250 at Martinsville Speedway on April 2, 2016. Decker was 38th fastest in qualifying and her MAKE Motorsports entry did not make the field.

In 2017, it was announced that Decker would drive in three ARCA races for Venturini Motorsports (Elko, Toledo, and Pocono). Decker made her ARCA debut at Toledo Speedway. After spending much of the race in the top-ten, she finished eleventh on the lead lap.

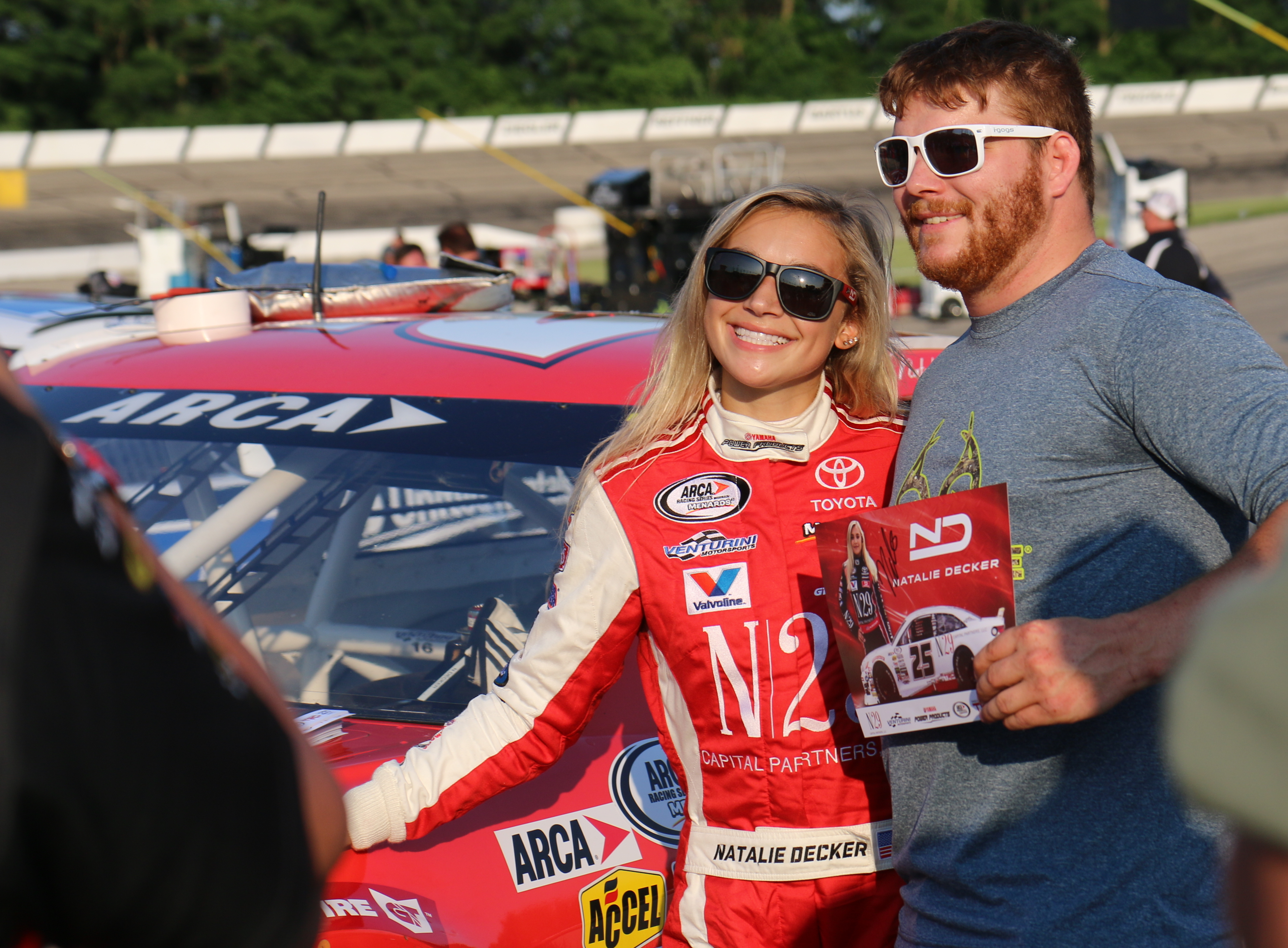
Decker poses with fans at Madison Speedway in the 2018 ARCA Racing Series.

Venturini later announced that they had signed Decker to drive the full 2018 ARCA schedule. Decker began the season by winning the pole at the season opening race at Daytona; she would finish fifth in a crash-filled race. Later on in the season, she was injured via hernia, and was forced to start the race and have Brennan Poole jump in, in which he would finish the race in eighth. She finished the season seventh in point standings, which was last among drivers who competed in every race.

On November 30, 2018, DGR-Crosley announced plans for Decker to run a partial Truck Series schedule for the team in the 2019 season, along with some ARCA and K&N Pro Series events.

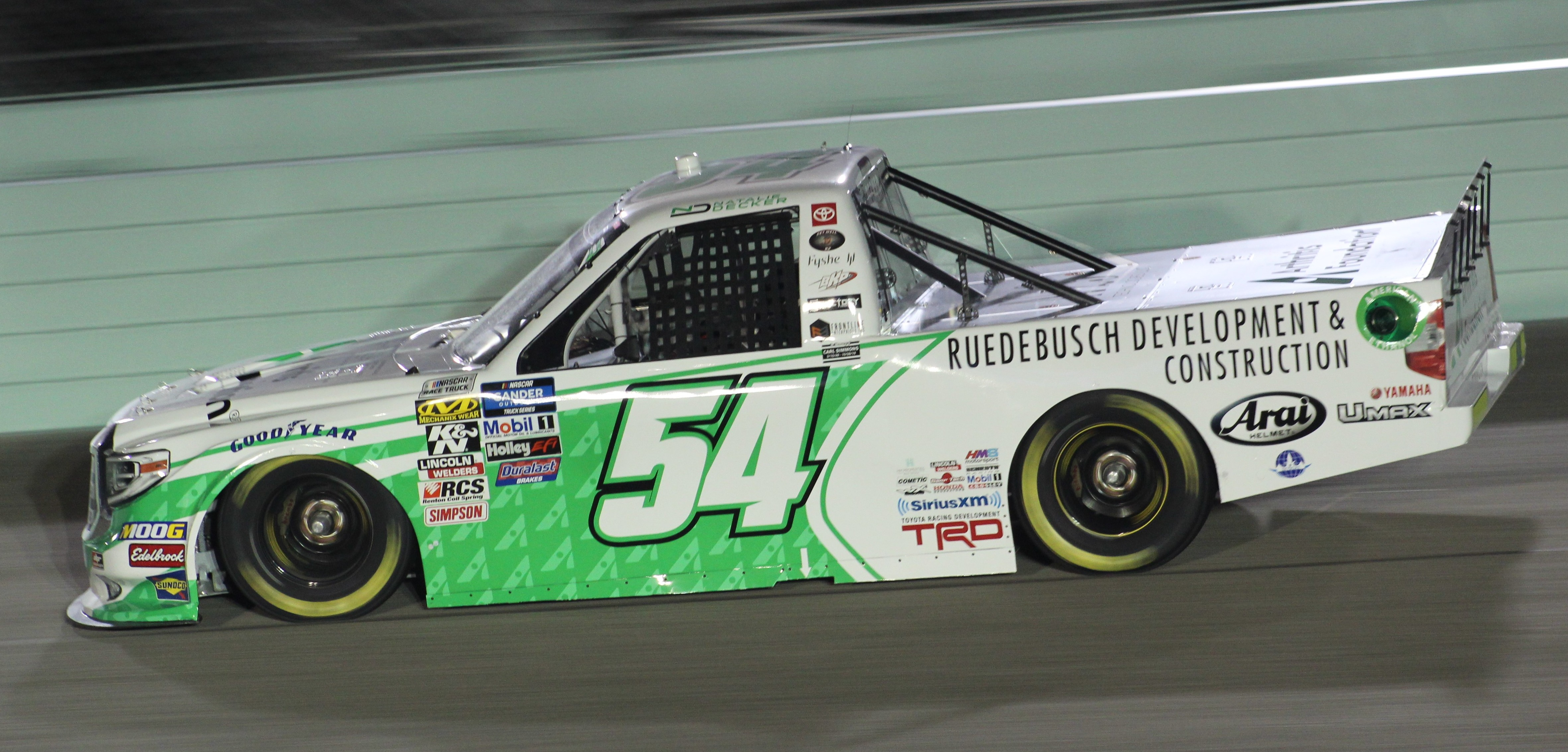
Decker racing at Homestead-Miami Speedway in the 2019 NASCAR Camping World Truck Series.

Decker's Truck series debut at Daytona saw her No. 54 Toyota cut a left front tire and rupture an oil line, setting the truck on fire on the first lap. At Kentucky Speedway in July, Decker was involved in an on-track incident with Spencer Boyd, eliminating both drivers from the race. Later, in the truck garage, Decker took Boyd’s hat off his head and slammed it on the ground before being verbally warned by a NASCAR official stating "that's enough". She was escorted away by her team.

Decker signed with Niece Motorsports for the 2020 season. On February 14, 2020, she finished fifth at Daytona, becoming the highest-finishing female driver in Truck Series history. She missed the Pocono race after being hospitalized for bile duct complications related to her gall bladder surgery in December 2019. On September 25, Decker was not medically cleared to race at Las Vegas after experiencing a high heart rate and high blood pressure; because her truck had cleared inspection and was placed on the starting grid, she was credited with a last-place finish in the race. Decker later pinpointed high blood pressure as the cause for fatigue, but with a deeper cause undetermined, she also missed the following race at Talladega Superspeedway, where Kaz Grala took the seat.

On February 5, 2021, it was announced that Decker would make her debut in the NASCAR Xfinity Series in 2021, driving the No. 23 for RSS Racing/Reaume Brothers Racing in at least five races beginning at the Daytona Road Course with sponsorship from Red Street Records, who will highlight the musicians they work with on the car, Jason Crabb being one of them. She remained in the No. 23 after Our Motorsports assumed operations.

In 2022, she attempted the Daytona season-opener with the No. 33 for Reaume Brothers Racing, but failed to qualify. However, she did qualify for the April Martinsville race, driving the No. 28 RSS Racing Ford in a collaboration with RBR. She also failed to qualify for the spring race at Talladega driving the No. 13 for MBM Motorsports. Decker was also going to run the race at Daytona in August, driving the No. 5 for B. J. McLeod Motorsports. However, her sponsor, Diesel Beverages, was not approved in time for the race. Diesel Beverages is a hemp/CBD product, which NASCAR had to examine to determine if it would be approved as a sponsor. She would be replaced in the car by Patrick Emerling. Decker stated that she hoped to run a different race later in the season if the sponsor is approved.

On February 8, 2023, it was announced that Decker would drive part-time for Emerling-Gase Motorsports in the Xfinity Series and the ARCA Menards Series in their No. 53 car in both series. It would be her first ARCA start since 2020 as well as EGM's first time fielding an entry in ARCA.

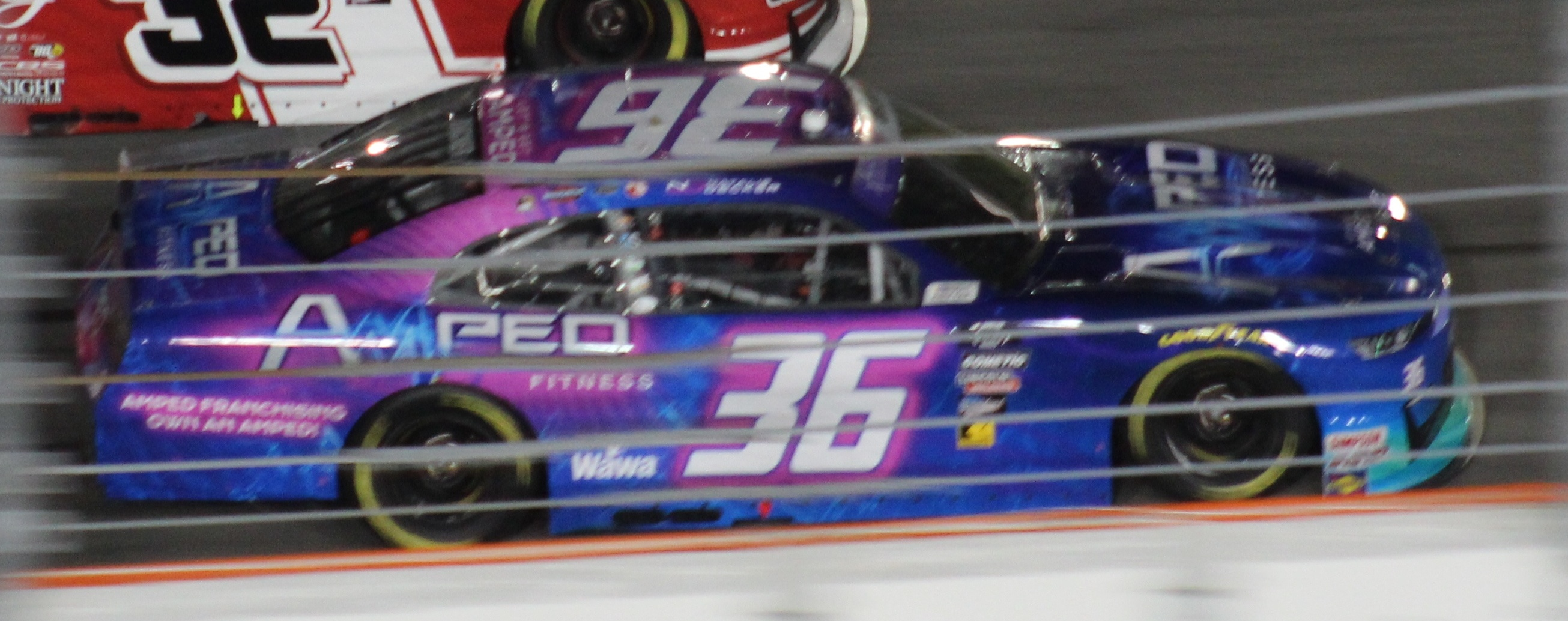
Decker racing at Daytona in the 2024 NASCAR Xfinity Series.

On February 7, 2024, DGM Racing announced that Decker would drive their No. 36 car in the Xfinity Series season-opener at Daytona. Decker was also going to drive the same car at Talladega in April, but like at Daytona in August 2022, had a sponsor that was not approved by NASCAR. As a result, DGM withdrew the No. 36 car, and she did not get to run that race. She would make another start for the team at Charlotte in May in their No. 92 car.

Decker became known in 2026 for a meltdown while driving for Team Reaume at Dover after NASCAR parked her for failing to maintain a reasonable pace. It was the second consecutive race she was black-flagged, after being parked for the same reason at Watkins Glen.

=== Other racing ===
On January 30 and 31, 2018, Decker tested a LMP3 sports car at Sebring International Raceway. The car was fielded by longtime Decker family friend Tony Ave. Ave wanted her to drive his car after he was impressed by her performance in the 2017 Road America ARCA race, where she finished seventh, which was her best finish of the season. In 2019, Decker is scheduled to race in five events for Ave's Trans Am team. She finished ninth in his TA car at Sebring International Raceway.

Decker was among the preliminary participants for the 2019 W Series. After making the initial cut from 55 drivers to 28, she did not survive the next round of cuts. Decker was scheduled to make her Trans-Am SGT class debut at Road Atlanta with Ave Motorsports in November 2020, but was forced to miss the race after testing positive for COVID-19.

In 2021, Decker raced several times for Ave in the Trans-Am Series. She took the SGT pole position in March at the Charlotte Roval and finished second in the race. She also finished second at Watkins Glen. She won the race at the Circuit of the Americas and won the SGT ProAm Challenge Title.

== Personal life ==
Decker is the cousin of sisters Paige and Claire Decker (daughters of Allen Decker). Her father is Chuck Decker, the former owner of the Eagle River Derby Track, which hosts the World Championship Snowmobile Derby. The Track was sold in August 2018 and is now called the World Championship Derby Complex.

The Decker family was prominent in snowmobile racing in the 1970s and 1980s; four Decker brothers raced snowmobiles including Allen Decker, a factory rider for Bombardier (and onetime teammate to Jacques Villeneuve), and Natalie's father Chuck, who won the 1987 World Championship Derby race at Eagle River. The Deckers also raced snowmobiles alongside the family of Danica Patrick. Sue Decker, Natalie's aunt, introduced Patrick's parents.

On September 29, 2019, Decker revealed that she has rheumatoid arthritis, which she was first diagnosed with at the age of two.

In December 2022, Decker got engaged to fellow NASCAR driver Derek Lemke (who would make his Truck Series debut for Reaume Brothers Racing in 2023). Decker and Lemke got married on New Year's Eve in 2023.

On August 14, 2024, Decker announced that she was expecting her first child. In February 2025, Decker gave birth to her first child, a son named Levi. She later stated that she had experienced complications during the delivery. Approximately six months after giving birth, she competed in the NASCAR Xfinity Series at Daytona International Speedway.

== Motorsports career results ==
=== NASCAR ===
(key) (Bold – Pole position awarded by qualifying time. Italics – Pole position earned by points standings or practice time. * – Most laps led.)

==== O'Reilly Auto Parts Series ====
NASCAR O'Reilly Auto Parts Series results
Year	Team	No.	Make	1	2	3	4	5	6	7	8	9	10	11	12	13	14	15	16	17	18	19	20	21	22	23	24	25	26	27	28	29	30	31	32	33	NOAPSC	Pts	Ref
2021	RSS Racing with Reaume Brothers Racing	23	Chevy	DAY	DRC; 40	HOM	LVS	PHO	ATL	MAR																											53rd	42	
2021	Our Motorsports	23	Chevy								TAL; 24	DAR	DOV	COA	CLT	MOH	TEX	NSH; 26	POC	ROA; 32	ATL	NHA	GLN	IND	MCH	DAY	DAR	RCH	BRI	LVS	TAL	CLT	TEX	KAN	MAR; 25	PHO	53rd	42	
2022	Reaume Brothers Racing	33	Toyota	DAY; DNQ	CAL	LVS	PHO	ATL	COA	RCH																											63rd	17	
2022	RSS Racing	28	Ford								MAR; 35																										63rd	17	
2022	MBM Motorsports	13	Ford									TAL; DNQ	DOV	DAR	TEX	CLT	PIR			ATL; 27	NHA	POC	IND	MCH	GLN	DAY	DAR	KAN	BRI	TEX	TAL	CLT	LVS	HOM	MAR	PHO	63rd	17	
2022	MBM Motorsports	66	Toyota															NSH; 32	ROA																		63rd	17	
2023	SS-Green Light Racing	08	Chevy	DAY	CAL	LVS	PHO	ATL	COA	RCH	MAR	TAL	DOV	DAR	CLT; 34	PIR	SON	NSH	CSC	ATL	NHA	POC	ROA	MCH	IRC	GLN											64th	5	
2023	Emerling-Gase Motorsports	53	Ford																								DAY; 35	DAR	KAN	BRI	TEX	ROV	LVS				64th	5	
2023	SS-Green Light Racing	07	Chevy																															HOM; DNQ	MAR	PHO	64th	5	
2024	DGM Racing	36	Chevy	DAY; 18	ATL	LVS	PHO	COA	RCH	MAR	TEX	TAL; Wth	DOV	DAR																							56th	27	
2024	DGM Racing	92	Chevy												CLT; 29	PIR	SON	IOW	NHA	NSH	CSC	POC	IND	MCH	DAY	DAR	ATL	GLN	BRI	KAN	TAL	ROV	LVS	HOM	MAR	PHO	56th	27	
2025	DGM Racing with Jesse Iwuji Motorsports	92	Chevy	DAY	ATL	COA	PHO	LVS	HOM	MAR	DAR	BRI	CAR	TAL	TEX	CLT	NSH	MXC	POC	ATL	CSC	SON	DOV	IND	IOW	GLN	DAY; 22	PIR	GTW	BRI	KAN	ROV	LVS	TAL	MAR	PHO	65th	15	
2026	Joey Gase Motorsports with Scott Osteen	35	Chevy	DAY; 33	ATL	COA	PHO	LVS	DAR	MAR	CAR	BRI	KAN	TAL; 33	TEX	GLN	DOV	CLT	NSH																		87th	0^{1}	
2026	Joey Gase Motorsports with Scott Osteen	53	Toyota																	POC; 34	COR	SON	CHI	ATL	IND	IOW											87th	0^{1}	
2026	Young's Motorsports	42	Chevy																								DAY; 22	DAR	GTW								87th	0^{1}	
2026	Team Stange Racing with Mike Harmon Racing	47	Chevy																											BRI; 37	LVS	CLT	PHO	TAL	MAR	HOM	87th	0^{1}	

==== Craftsman Truck Series ====
NASCAR Craftsman Truck Series results
Year	Team	No.	Make	1	2	3	4	5	6	7	8	9	10	11	12	13	14	15	16	17	18	19	20	21	22	23	24	25	NCTC	Pts	Ref
2016	MAKE Motorsports	14	Chevy	DAY	ATL	MAR; DNQ	KAN	DOV	CLT	TEX	IOW	GTW	KEN	ELD	POC	BRI	MCH	MSP	CHI	NHA	LVS	TAL	MAR	TEX	PHO	HOM			118th	-	
2019	DGR-Crosley	54	Toyota	DAY; 32	ATL; 24	LVS; 13	MAR	TEX	DOV; 17	KAN; 25	CLT; 31	TEX; 22	IOW; 17	GTW; 27	CHI; 14	KEN; 27	POC; 16	ELD	MCH; 27	BRI; 25	MSP	LVS; 25	TAL; 16	MAR; 22	PHO; 22	HOM; 20			19th	281	
2020	Niece Motorsports	44	Chevy	DAY; 5	LVS; 21	CLT; 27	ATL	HOM	POC	KEN; 29	TEX; 35	KAN; 21	KAN; 35	MCH	DAY; 20	DOV	GTW; 28	DAR	RCH; 34	BRI; 29	LVS; 36	TAL	KAN	TEX; 30	MAR; 27	PHO			33rd	153	
2022	Reaume Brothers Racing	43	Toyota	DAY	LVS	ATL	COA	MAR	BRI	DAR	KAN	TEX	CLT	GTW	SON	KNX	NSH	MOH	POC	IRP	RCH	KAN	BRI	TAL; DNQ	HOM	PHO			114th	0	
2026	Team Reaume	22	Ford	DAY	ATL	STP	DAR	CAR	BRI	TEX	GLN; 36	DOV; 34	CLT	NSH	MCH	COR	LRP	NWS	IRP	RCH	NHA	BRI	KAN	CLT	PHO	TAL	MAR	HOM	86th	4	

^{*} Season still in progress
^{1} Ineligible for series points

==== K&N Pro Series East ====
NASCAR K&N Pro Series East results
Year	Team	No.	Make	1	2	3	4	5	6	7	8	9	10	11	12	NKNPSEC	Pts	Ref
2019	DGR-Crosley	98	Toyota	NSM	BRI; 19	SBO	SBO	MEM	NHA	IOW	GLN	BRI	GTW	NHA	DOV	47th	25	

=== ARCA Menards Series ===
(key) (Bold – Pole position awarded by qualifying time. Italics – Pole position earned by points standings or practice time. * – Most laps led.)

ARCA Menards Series results
Year	Team	No.	Make	1	2	3	4	5	6	7	8	9	10	11	12	13	14	15	16	17	18	19	20	AMSC	Pts	Ref
2017	Venturini Motorsports	25	Toyota	DAY	NSH	SLM	TAL	TOL; 11	ELK; 13	POC; 27	MCH	MAD	IOW	IRP	POC; 10	WIN	ISF	ROA; 7	DSF	SLM	CHI		KAN; 12	23rd	1150	
2017	Venturini Motorsports	55	Toyota																			KEN; 12		23rd	1150	
2018	Venturini Motorsports	25	Toyota	**DAY**; 5	NSH; 11	SLM; 17	TAL; 28	TOL; 7	CLT; 15	POC; 8	MCH; 15	MAD; 6	GTW; 15	CHI; 12	IOW; 16	ELK; 5	POC; 15	ISF; 10	BLN; 10	DSF; 12	SLM; 8	IRP; 16	KAN; 6	7th	4220	
2019	DGR-Crosley	54	Toyota	DAY; 6	FIF	SLM	TAL; 23	NSH	TOL	CLT	POC	MCH	MAD	GTW	CHI	ELK	IOW	POC	ISF	DSF	SLM	IRP	KAN	56th	315	
2020	Ken Schrader Racing with Fury Race Cars	52	Ford	DAY; 26	PHO	TAL	POC	IRP	KEN	IOW	KAN	TOL	TOL	MCH	DAY	GTW	L44	TOL	BRI	WIN	MEM	ISF	KAN	86th	18	
2023	Emerling-Gase Motorsports	53	Ford	DAY; 14	PHO	TAL	KAN	CLT	BLN	ELK	MOH	IOW	POC	MCH	IRP	GLN	ISF	MLW	DSF	KAN	BRI	SLM	TOL	92nd	30	
