= Lou Goss =

American stock car racing driver

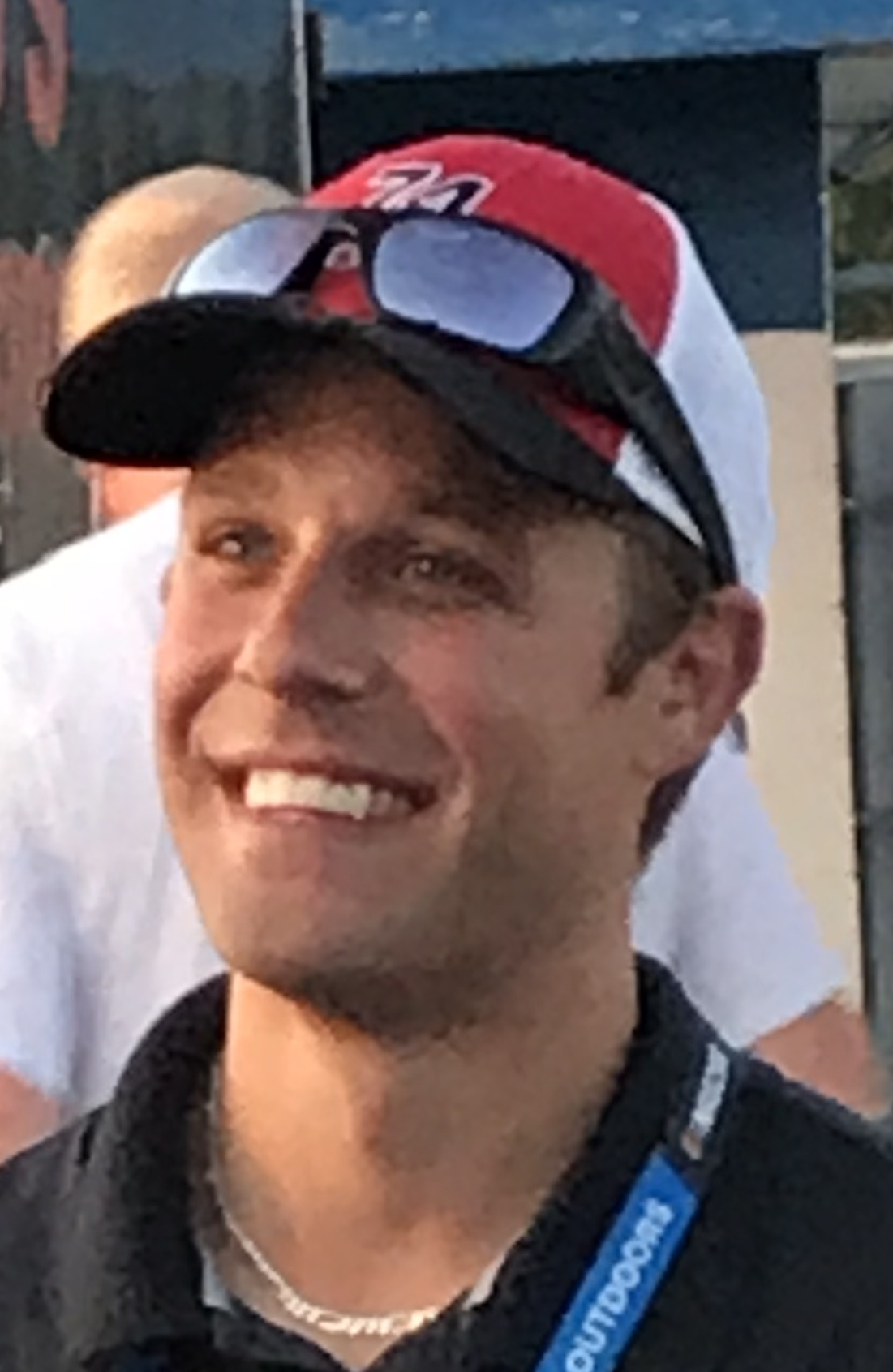
- Goss in 2019
- Born: May 22, 1987 (age 39); Green Bay, Wisconsin, U.S.

NASCAR FedEx Freight Truck Series career
- 1 race run over 1 year
- 2019 position: 95th
- Best finish: 95th (2019)
- First race: 2019 CarShield 200 (Gateway)
Wins	Top tens	Poles
0	0	0
- Statistics up to date as of November 18, 2019.

Louis Goss (born May 22, 1987) is an American professional stock car racing driver. He currently competes part-time in the ASA Midwest Tour, driving the No. 36 Chevrolet.

== Racing career ==
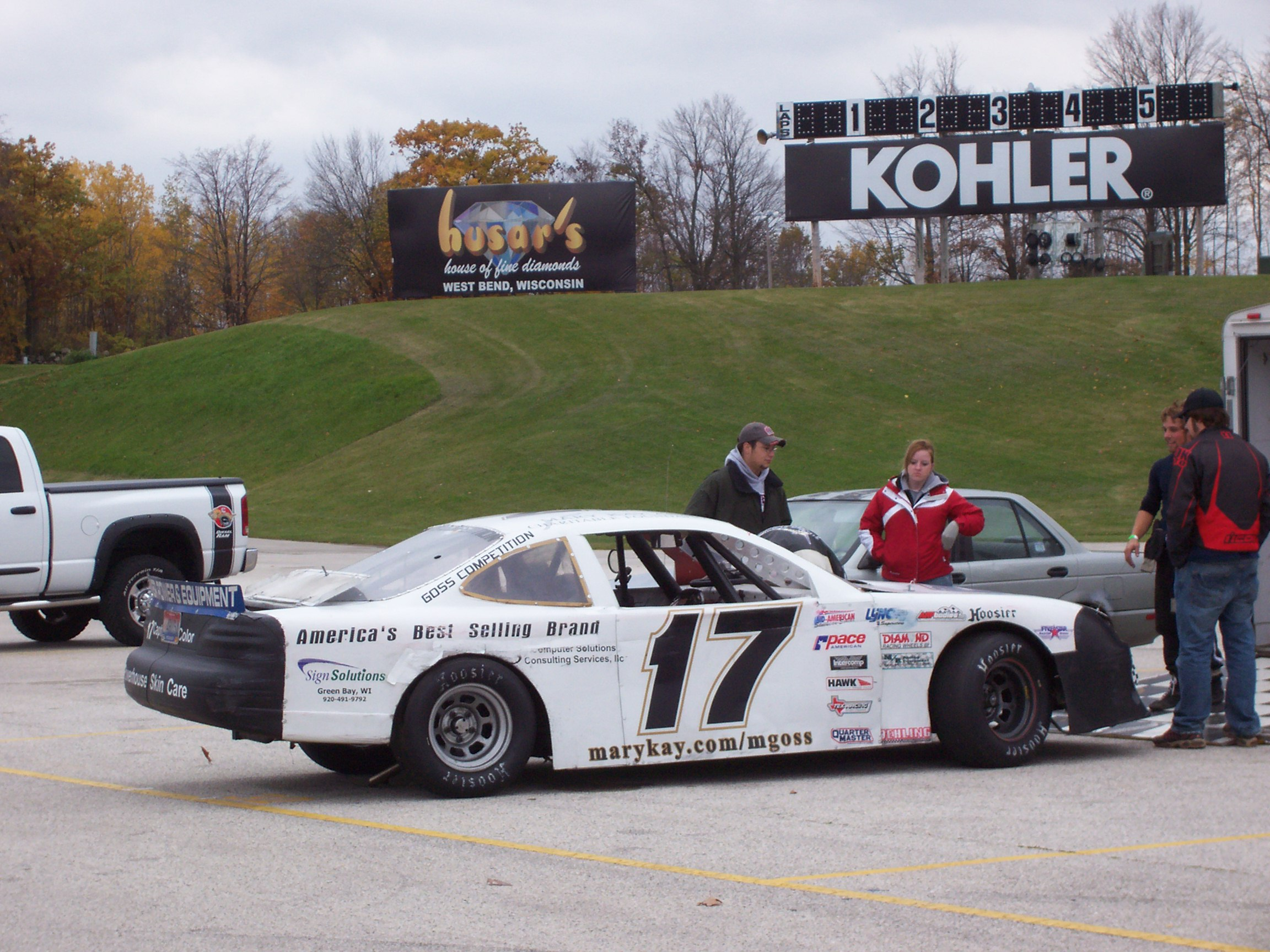
Goss' 2006 Mid American car in the pits at Road America

As a local short track driver, Goss raced a number of classes at local tracks in Wisconsin, including super stocks and super late models. He also competed in the Mid-American Stock Car Series, which his father had also raced in. In 2018, Goss' brother talked to a crewman from B. J. McLeod Motorsports, and the two eventually served on pit crews later that year. Also in 2018, Goss was approved by NASCAR to run Truck Series races at tracks one mile in length and under.

During the 2020 season, Goss ran part-time in the ARCA Midwest Tour.

=== NASCAR ===
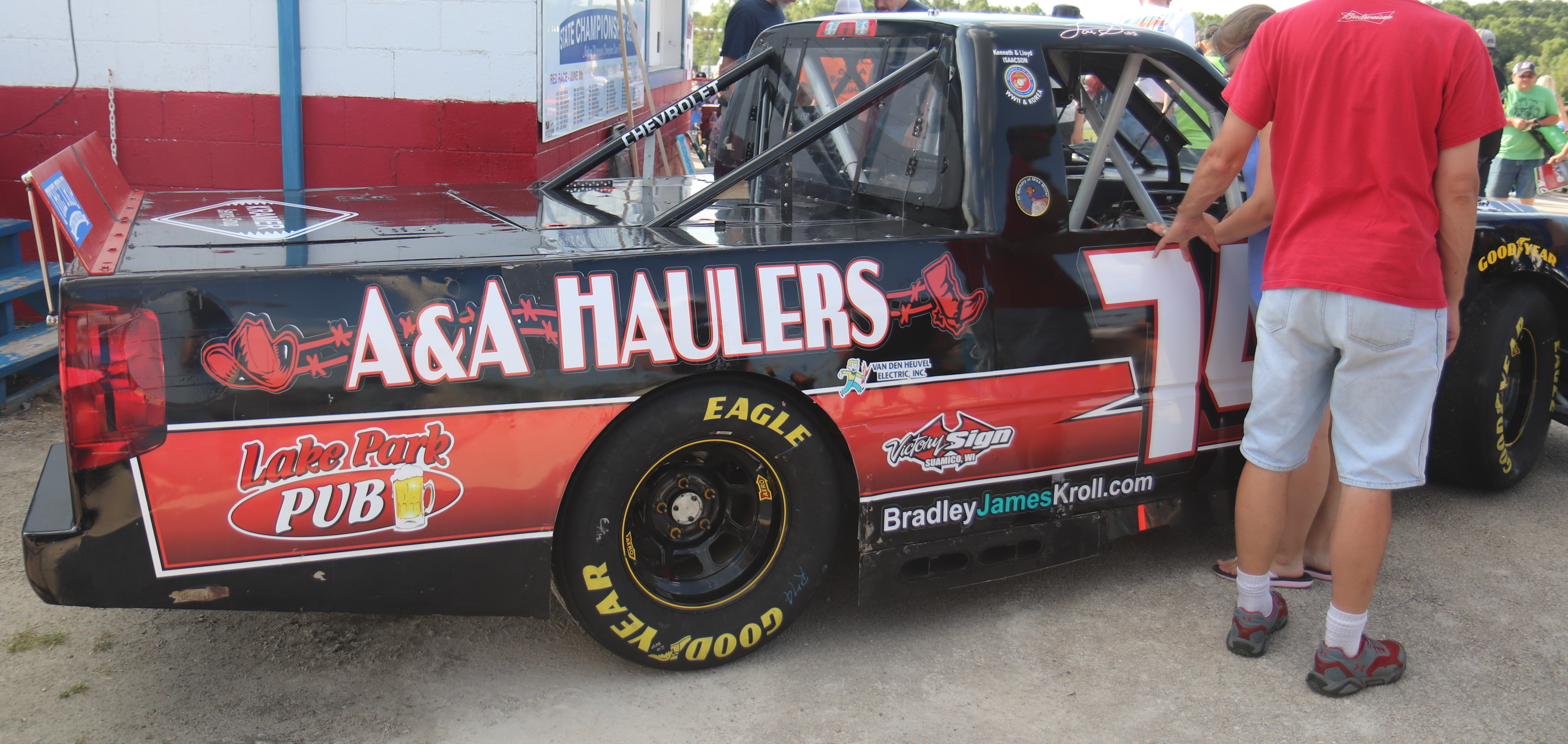
Goss' No. 74 truck on display in 2019

Goss created his own NASCAR Gander Outdoors Truck Series team after buying old trucks from Mike Harmon Racing over the 2018–2019 offseason, and bought his own trucks because of the large expense of renting other teams' trucks. Goss was scheduled to make his series debut at Iowa Speedway in June 2019, but he withdrew from the event after arriving at the track without a fuel cell and some engine parts. He made his series debut in the 2019 CarShield 200 at World Wide Technology Raceway the next week. He also rented owner points to Darwin Peters Jr. at Eldora in 2019.

== Personal life ==
Before quitting his job for his race team in 2019, Goss was a mechanical engineer working in Sturgeon Bay, Wisconsin. He graduated from Green Bay Southwest High School, and attended University of Wisconsin-Green Bay.

== Motorsports career results ==
=== NASCAR ===
==== Gander Outdoors Truck Series ====
NASCAR Gander Outdoors Truck Series results
Year	Team	No.	Make	1	2	3	4	5	6	7	8	9	10	11	12	13	14	15	16	17	18	19	20	21	22	23	NGOTC	Pts	Ref
2019	Lou Goss Racing	74	Chevy	DAY	ATL	LVS	MAR	TEX	DOV	KAN	CLT	TEX	IOW	GTW; 31	CHI	KEN	POC	ELD	MCH	BRI; DNQ	MSP	LVS	TAL	MAR	PHO	HOM	95th	6	
