= 2019 Eldora Dirt Derby =

Race details
- Race 15 of 23 in the 2019 NASCAR Gander Outdoors Truck Series season
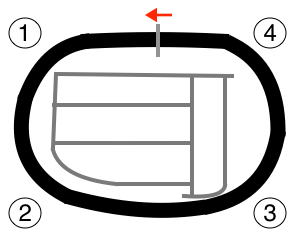
- Date: August 1, 2019
- Location: Eldora Speedway in Rossburg, Ohio
- Course: Permanent racing facility
- Course length: .804 km (.500 miles)
- Distance: 150 laps, 75 mi (121 km)

Pole position
Driver	Chase Briscoe	ThorSport Racing

Most laps led
Driver	Chase Briscoe	ThorSport Racing
- Laps: 93

Winner
No. 52	Stewart Friesen	Halmar Friesen Racing

Television in the United States
- Network: FS1

Radio in the United States
- Radio: MRN

The 2019 Eldora Dirt Derby was a NASCAR Gander Outdoors Truck Series race held on August 1, 2019, at Eldora Speedway in Rossburg, Ohio. Contested over 150 laps on the 0.500-mile (0.805 km) dirt track, it was the 15th race of the 2019 NASCAR Gander Outdoors Truck Series season.

== Background ==
=== Track ===
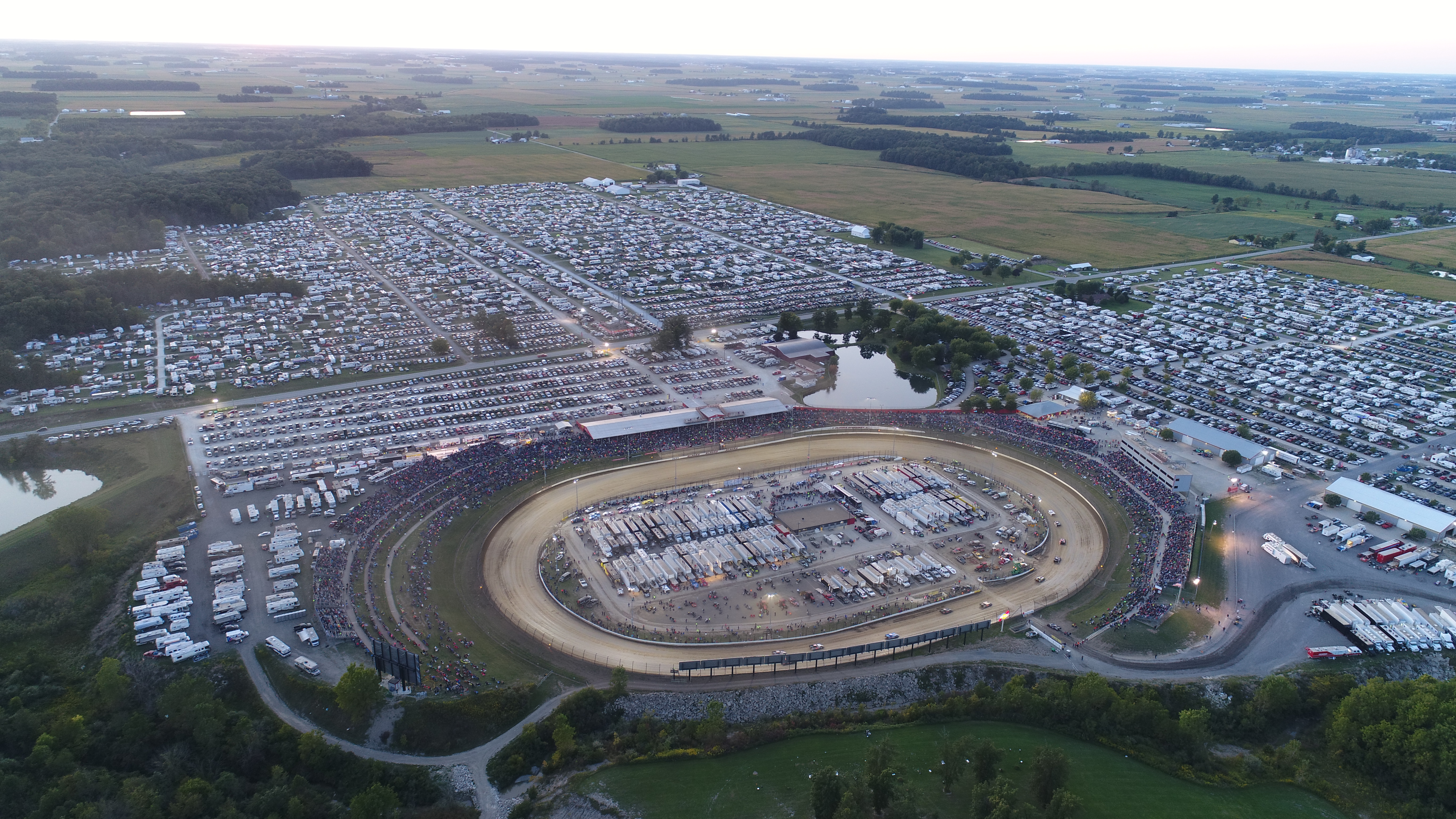
The speedway in September 2017.

Eldora Speedway is a 0.5 mi (804.672 m) high-banked clay dirt oval. Located north of Rossburg, Ohio in the village of New Weston, Ohio. Originally constructed as a 1/4-mile semi-banked clay dirt oval by track founder and legendary promoter Earl Baltes, Eldora was enlarged to a 3/8-mile length and later to the "half-mile" standard required by the United States Auto Club (USAC) for National Championship events featuring the stars of the Indianapolis 500.

== Entry list ==
No.	Driver	Team	Manufacturer
02	Tyler Dippel (R)	Young's Motorsports	Chevrolet
2	Sheldon Creed (R)	GMS Racing	Chevrolet
03	Jake Griffin	Mike Affarano Motorsports	Chevrolet
3	Carson Hocevar	Jordan Anderson Racing	Chevrolet
4	Todd Gilliland	Kyle Busch Motorsports	Toyota
6	Norm Benning	Norm Benning Racing	Chevrolet
08	Tim Ward	Kart Idaho Racing	Toyota
8	Colt Gilliam	NEMCO Motorsports	Chevrolet
10	Jennifer Jo Cobb	Jennifer Jo Cobb Racing	Chevrolet
12	Gus Dean (R)	Young's Motorsports	Chevrolet
13	Johnny Sauter	ThorSport Racing	Ford
16	Austin Hill	Hattori Racing Enterprises	Toyota
17	Tyler Ankrum (R)	DGR-Crosley	Toyota
18	Harrison Burton (R)	Kyle Busch Motorsports	Toyota
20	Landon Huffman	Young's Motorsports	Chevrolet
22	Austin Wayne Self	AM Racing	Chevrolet
24	Brett Moffitt	GMS Racing	Chevrolet
27	Chase Briscoe (i)	ThorSport Racing	Ford
32	Devin Dodson	Reaume Brothers Racing	Chevrolet
33	Mike Marlar	Reaume Brothers Racing	Toyota
34	Mason Massey	Reaume Brothers Racing	Chevrolet
38	Mark Smith	Niece Motorsports	Chevrolet
44	Jeffrey Abbey	Niece Motorsports	Chevrolet
45	Ross Chastain	Niece Motorsports	Chevrolet
51	Christian Eckes	Kyle Busch Motorsports	Toyota
52	Stewart Friesen	Halmar Friesen Racing	Chevrolet
54	Kyle Strickler	DGR-Crosley	Toyota
74	Darwin Peters Jr.	Lou Goss Racing	Chevrolet
80	Justin Shipley	Jacob Wallace Racing	Ford
88	Matt Crafton	ThorSport Racing	Ford
98	Grant Enfinger	ThorSport Racing	Ford
99	Ben Rhodes	ThorSport Racing	Ford

== Practice ==
=== First practice ===
Chase Briscoe was the fastest in the first practice session with a time of 19.257 seconds and a speed of 93.472 mph (150.429 km/h).

Pos	No.	Driver	Team	Manufacturer	Time	Speed
1	27	Chase Briscoe (i)	ThorSport Racing	Ford	19.257	93.472
2	88	Matt Crafton	ThorSport Racing	Ford	19.381	92.874
3	24	Brett Moffitt	GMS Racing	Chevrolet	19.470	92.450

=== Final practice ===
Stewart Friesen was the fastest in the final practice session with a time of 19.886 seconds and a speed of 90.516 mph (145.671 km/h).

Pos	No.	Driver	Team	Manufacturer	Time	Speed
1	52	Stewart Friesen	Halmar Friesen Racing	Chevrolet	19.886	90.516
2	27	Chase Briscoe (i)	ThorSport Racing	Ford	19.933	90.303
3	24	Brett Moffitt	GMS Racing	Chevrolet	19.980	90.090

== Qualifying heat races ==
Chase Briscoe scored the pole for the race after winning the first qualifying heat race.

=== Race 1 ===
Pos	Grid	No	Driver	Team	Manufacturer	Laps
1	1	27	Chase Briscoe (i)	ThorSport Racing	Ford	10
2	2	13	Johnny Sauter	ThorSport Racing	Ford	10
3	4	18	Harrison Burton (R)	Kyle Busch Motorsports	Toyota	10
4	6	8	Colt Gilliam	NEMCO Motorsports	Chevrolet	10
5	3	44	Jeffrey Abbey	Niece Motorsports	Chevrolet	10
6	5	22	Austin Wayne Self	AM Racing	Chevrolet	10
7	7	10	Jennifer Jo Cobb	Jennifer Jo Cobb Racing	Chevrolet	10

=== Race 2 ===
Pos	Grid	No	Driver	Team	Manufacturer	Laps
1	1	88	Matt Crafton	ThorSport Racing	Ford	10
2	2	02	Tyler Dippel (R)	Young's Motorsports	Chevrolet	10
3	4	45	Ross Chastain	Niece Motorsports	Chevrolet	10
4	3	51	Christian Eckes	Kyle Busch Motorsports	Toyota	10
5	6	20	Landon Huffman	Young's Motorsports	Chevrolet	10
6	5	17	Tyler Ankrum (R)	DGR-Crosley	Toyota	10
7	7	74	Darwin Peters Jr.	Lou Goss Racing	Chevrolet	9

=== Race 3 ===
Pos	Grid	No	Driver	Team	Manufacturer	Laps
1	1	24	Brett Moffitt	GMS Racing	Chevrolet	10
2	2	4	Todd Gilliland	Kyle Busch Motorsports	Toyota	10
3	5	3	Carson Hocevar	Jordan Anderson Racing	Chevrolet	10
4	4	03	Jake Griffin	Mike Affarano Motorsports	Chevrolet	10
5	3	33	Mike Marlar	Reaume Brothers Racing	Toyota	10
6	6	32	Devin Dodson	Reaume Brothers Racing	Chevrolet	9

=== Race 4 ===
Pos	Grid	No	Driver	Team	Manufacturer	Laps
1	1	52	Stewart Friesen	Halmar Friesen Racing	Chevrolet	10
2	2	99	Ben Rhodes	ThorSport Racing	Ford	10
3	3	80	Justin Shipley	Jacob Wallace Racing	Ford	10
4	4	16	Austin Hill	Hattori Racing Enterprises	Toyota	10
5	5	38	Mark Smith	Niece Motorsports	Chevrolet	10
6	6	6	Norm Benning	Norm Benning Racing	Chevrolet	10

=== Race 5 ===
Pos	Grid	No	Driver	Team	Manufacturer	Laps
1	2	54	Kyle Strickler	DGR-Crosley	Toyota	10
2	1	2	Sheldon Creed (R)	GMS Racing	Chevrolet	10
3	3	98	Grant Enfinger	ThorSport Racing	Ford	10
4	4	12	Gus Dean (R)	Young's Motorsports	Chevrolet	10
5	6	08	Tim Ward	Kart Idaho Racing	Toyota	10
6	5	34	Mason Massey	Reaume Brothers Racing	Chevrolet	0

=== "Last Chance" qualifying race ===
Pos	Grid	No	Driver	Team	Manufacturer	Laps
1	2	17	Tyler Ankrum (R)	DGR-Crosley	Toyota	15
2	4	6	Norm Benning	Norm Benning Racing	Chevrolet	15
3	5	34	Mason Massey	Reaume Brothers Racing	Chevrolet	15
4	6	10	Jennifer Jo Cobb	Jennifer Jo Cobb Racing	Chevrolet	15
5	7	74	Darwin Peters Jr.	Lou Goss Racing	Chevrolet	15
6	3	32	Devin Dodson	Reaume Brothers Racing	Chevrolet	14
7	1	22	Austin Wayne Self	AM Racing	Chevrolet	5

=== Starting lineup ===
Pos	No	Driver	Team	Manufacturer
1	27	Chase Briscoe (i)	ThorSport Racing	Ford
2	88	Matt Crafton	ThorSport Racing	Ford
3	24	Brett Moffitt	GMS Racing	Chevrolet
4	52	Stewart Friesen	Halmar Friesen Racing	Chevrolet
5	54	Kyle Strickler	DGR-Crosley	Toyota
6	13	Johnny Sauter	ThorSport Racing	Ford
7	02	Tyler Dippel (R)	Young's Motorsports	Chevrolet
8	4	Todd Gilliland	Kyle Busch Motorsports	Toyota
9	99	Ben Rhodes	ThorSport Racing	Ford
10	2	Sheldon Creed (R)	GMS Racing	Chevrolet
11	18	Harrison Burton (R)	Kyle Busch Motorsports	Toyota
12	45	Ross Chastain	Niece Motorsports	Chevrolet
13	3	Carson Hocevar	Jordan Anderson Racing	Chevrolet
14	80	Justin Shipley	Jacob Wallace Racing	Ford
15	98	Grant Enfinger	ThorSport Racing	Ford
16	8	Colt Gilliam	NEMCO Motorsports	Chevrolet
17	51	Christian Eckes	Kyle Busch Motorsports	Toyota
18	03	Jake Griffin	Mike Affarano Motorsports	Chevrolet
19	16	Austin Hill	Hattori Racing Enterprises	Toyota
20	12	Gus Dean (R)	Young's Motorsports	Chevrolet
21	44	Jeffrey Abbey	Niece Motorsports	Chevrolet
22	20	Landon Huffman	Young's Motorsports	Chevrolet
23	33	Mike Marlar	Reaume Brothers Racing	Toyota
24	38	Mark Smith	Niece Motorsports	Chevrolet
25	08	Tim Ward	Kart Idaho Racing	Toyota
26	17	Tyler Ankrum (R)	DGR-Crosley	Toyota
27	6	Norm Benning	Norm Benning Racing	Chevrolet
28	34	Mason Massey	Reaume Brothers Racing	Chevrolet
29	10	Jennifer Jo Cobb	Jennifer Jo Cobb Racing	Chevrolet
30	74	Darwin Peters Jr.	Lou Goss Racing	Chevrolet
31	32	Devin Dodson	Reaume Brothers Racing	Chevrolet
32	22	Austin Wayne Self	AM Racing	Chevrolet

== Race ==
=== Summary ===
Chase Briscoe started on pole and remained in the lead, winning Stage 1 despite cautions caused by Landon Huffman and Jake Griffin spinning on separate occasions. Harrison Burton later spun on the backstretch on lap 57. A huge crash occurred on lap 65 after Christian Eckes spun around and collected numerous others including Johnny Sauter, Mason Massey, and Jeffrey Abbey. Stage 2 was also won by Briscoe, who had continued his strong lead.

After Stage 2, Stewart Friesen took over the lead. Ross Chastain spun in front of the field, though did not cause any major damage. Kyle Strickler brought out the next caution after spinning out, while another crash collected Briscoe, Sauter, and Tyler Dippel. At the same time, Jennifer Jo Cobb got turned by Norm Benning and collected Devin Dodson.

Dippel failed an attempted slide job on Ben Rhodes late in the race, pushing Rhodes into the fence and dropping him six spots behind Dippel. After the race, Dippel rammed into Rhodes on the cool-down lap, leading Rhodes to attempt to drag Dippel out of his truck on pit road after the race before being pulled away by NASCAR officials. Dippel later called out Rhodes in an expletive-laced tirade, calling it "cool" that Rhodes would miss the playoffs and implying that Rhodes was scared of fighting him. Rhodes, in a calmer post-race interview, called Dippel a dirty driver.

On the final restart, Friesen stayed out and was able to maintain his lead, holding off Sheldon Creed and Grant Enfinger to win the dirt derby. This was also Friesen's first win in the truck series.

=== Stage Results ===
Stage One Laps: 40

Pos	No	Driver	Team	Manufacturer	Points
1	27	Chase Briscoe (i)	ThorSport Racing	Ford	0
2	4	Todd Gilliland	Kyle Busch Motorsports	Toyota	9
3	24	Brett Moffitt	GMS Racing	Chevrolet	8
4	2	Sheldon Creed (R)	GMS Racing	Chevrolet	7
5	88	Matt Crafton	ThorSport Racing	Ford	6
6	52	Stewart Friesen	Halmar Friesen Racing	Chevrolet	5
7	99	Ben Rhodes	ThorSport Racing	Ford	4
8	3	Carson Hocevar	Jordan Anderson Racing	Chevrolet	3
9	45	Ross Chastain	Niece Motorsports	Chevrolet	2
10	54	Kyle Strickler	DGR-Crosley	Toyota	1

Stage Two Laps: 50

Pos	No	Driver	Team	Manufacturer	Points
1	27	Chase Briscoe (i)	ThorSport Racing	Ford	0
2	52	Stewart Friesen	Halmar Friesen Racing	Chevrolet	9
3	88	Matt Crafton	ThorSport Racing	Ford	8
4	54	Kyle Strickler	DGR-Crosley	Toyota	7
5	98	Grant Enfinger	ThorSport Racing	Ford	6
6	45	Ross Chastain	Niece Motorsports	Chevrolet	5
7	4	Todd Gilliland	Kyle Busch Motorsports	Toyota	4
8	33	Mike Marlar	Reaume Brothers Racing	Toyota	3
9	02	Tyler Dippel (R)	Young's Motorsports	Chevrolet	2
10	99	Ben Rhodes	ThorSport Racing	Ford	1

=== Final Stage Results ===
Stage Three Laps: 60

Pos	Grid	No	Driver	Team	Manufacturer	Laps	Points
1	4	52	Stewart Friesen	Halmar Friesen Racing	Chevrolet	150	54
2	10	2	Sheldon Creed (R)	GMS Racing	Chevrolet	150	42
3	15	98	Grant Enfinger	ThorSport Racing	Ford	150	40
4	23	33	Mike Marlar	Reaume Brothers Racing	Toyota	150	36
5	8	4	Todd Gilliland	Kyle Busch Motorsports	Toyota	150	45
6	17	51	Christian Eckes	Kyle Busch Motorsports	Toyota	150	31
7	1	27	Chase Briscoe (i)	ThorSport Racing	Ford	150	0
8	7	02	Tyler Dippel (R)	Young's Motorsports	Chevrolet	150	31
9	26	17	Tyler Ankrum (R)	DGR-Crosley	Toyota	150	28
10	2	88	Matt Crafton	ThorSport Racing	Ford	150	41
11	14	80	Justin Shipley	Jacob Wallace Racing	Ford	150	26
12	12	45	Ross Chastain	Niece Motorsports	Chevrolet	150	32
13	32	22	Austin Wayne Self	AM Racing	Chevrolet	150	24
14	9	99	Ben Rhodes	ThorSport Racing	Ford	150	28
15	24	38	Mark Smith	Niece Motorsports	Chevrolet	150	22
16	25	08	Tim Ward	Kart Idaho Racing	Toyota	150	21
17	30	74	Darwin Peters Jr.	Lou Goss Racing	Chevrolet	150	20
18	5	54	Kyle Strickler	DGR-Crosley	Toyota	149	27
19	29	10	Jennifer Jo Cobb	Jennifer Jo Cobb Racing	Chevrolet	149	18
20	21	44	Jeffrey Abbey	Niece Motorsports	Chevrolet	147	17
21	6	13	Johnny Sauter	ThorSport Racing	Ford	145	16
22	27	6	Norm Benning	Norm Benning Racing	Chevrolet	145	15
23	28	34	Mason Massey	Reaume Brothers Racing	Chevrolet	144	14
24	22	20	Landon Huffman	Young's Motorsports	Chevrolet	144	13
25	13	3	Carson Hocevar	Jordan Anderson Racing	Chevrolet	143	15
26	18	03	Jake Griffin	Mike Affarano Motorsports	Chevrolet	143	11
27	16	8	Colt Gilliam	NEMCO Motorsports	Chevrolet	143	10
28	20	12	Gus Dean (R)	Young's Motorsports	Chevrolet	142	9
29	3	24	Brett Moffitt	GMS Racing	Chevrolet	141	16
30	31	32	Devin Dodson	Reaume Brothers Racing	Chevrolet	141	7
31	11	18	Harrison Burton (R)	Kyle Busch Motorsports	Toyota	127	6
32	19	16	Austin Hill	Hattori Racing Enterprises	Toyota	79	5

Previous race: 2019 Gander RV 150	NASCAR Gander Outdoors Truck Series; 2019 season	Next race: 2019 Corrigan Oil 200
