= 2019 UNOH 200 =

Race details
- Race 17 of 23 in the 2019 NASCAR Gander Outdoors Truck Series season
- Date: August 15, 2019
- Location: Bristol Motor Speedway in Bristol, Tennessee
- Course: Permanent racing facility
- Course length: 0.533 miles (0.858 km)
- Distance: 200 laps, 106.6 mi (171.556 km)

Pole position
Driver	Brett Moffitt	GMS Racing
- Time: 15.027

Most laps led
Driver	Ross Chastain	Niece Motorsports
- Laps: 78

Winner
No. 24	Brett Moffitt	GMS Racing

Television in the United States
- Network: FS1

Radio in the United States
- Radio: MRN

The 2019 UNOH 200 is a NASCAR Gander Outdoors Truck Series race held on August 15, 2019, at Bristol Motor Speedway in Bristol, Tennessee. Contested over 200 laps on the 0.533 miles (0.858 km) concrete short track, it was the 17th race of the 2019 NASCAR Gander Outdoors Truck Series season, first race of the Playoffs, and the first race of the Round of 8.

== Background ==
=== Track ===
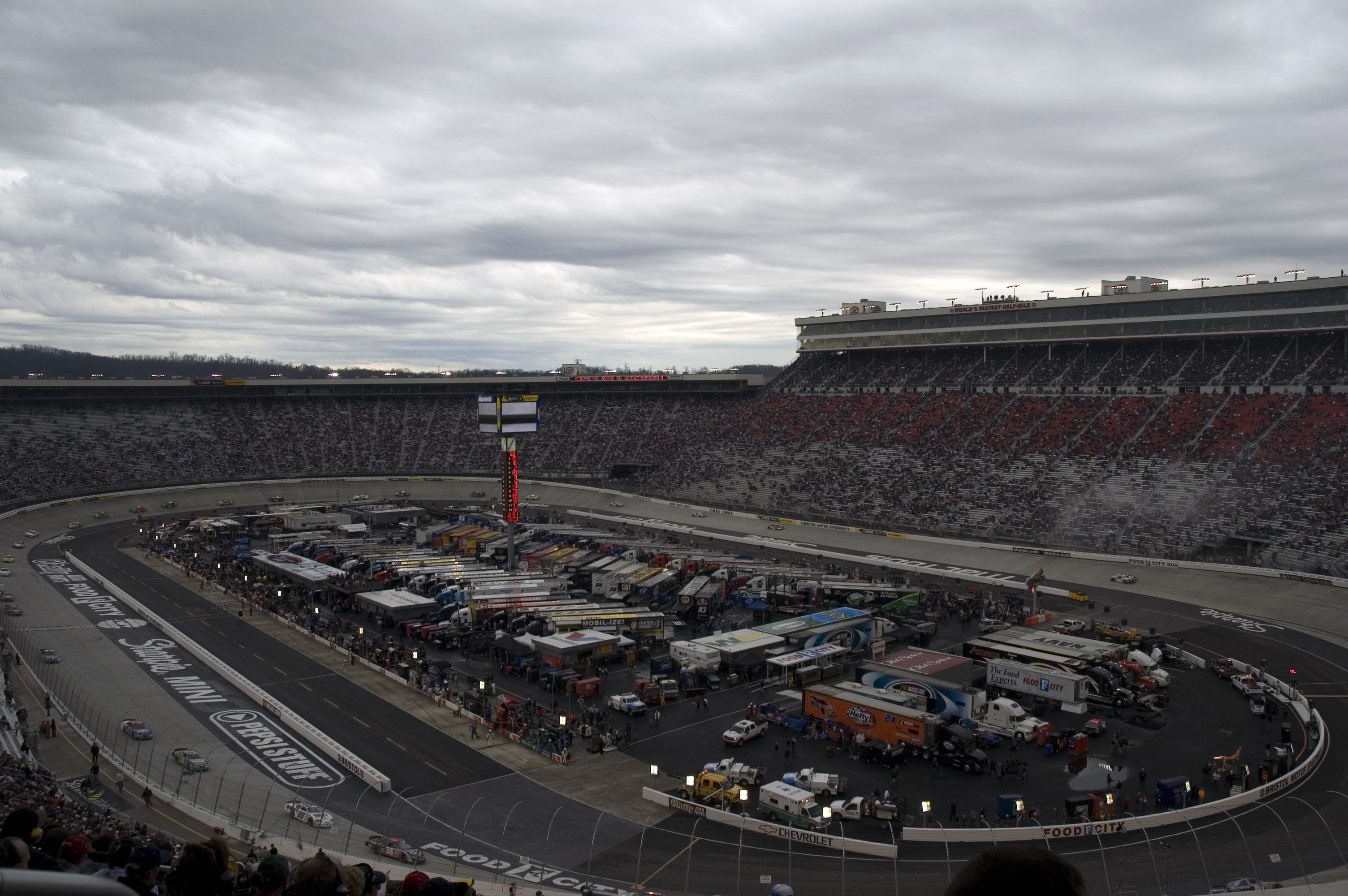
Bristol Motor Speedway, the track where the race was held.

Bristol Motor Speedway, formerly known as Bristol International Raceway and Bristol Raceway, is a NASCAR short track venue located in Bristol, Tennessee. Constructed in 1960, it held its first NASCAR race on July 30, 1961. Despite its short length, Bristol is among the most popular tracks on the NASCAR schedule because of its distinct features, which include steep banking, an all concrete surface, two pit roads, and stadium-like seating.

== Entry list ==
No.	Driver	Team	Manufacturer
02	Tyler Dippel (R)	Young's Motorsports	Chevrolet
2	Sheldon Creed (R)	GMS Racing	Chevrolet
3	Jordan Anderson	Jordan Anderson Racing	Chevrolet
04	Cory Roper	Roper Racing	Ford
4	Todd Gilliland	Kyle Busch Motorsports	Toyota
8	John Hunter Nemechek (i)	NEMCO Motorsports	Chevrolet
9	Codie Rohrbaugh	CR7 Motorsports	Chevrolet
10	Jennifer Jo Cobb	Jennifer Jo Cobb Racing	Chevrolet
12	Gus Dean (R)	Young's Motorsports	Chevrolet
13	Johnny Sauter	ThorSport Racing	Ford
15	Dylan Lupton	DGR-Crosley	Toyota
16	Austin Hill	Hattori Racing Enterprises	Toyota
17	Tyler Ankrum (R)	DGR-Crosley	Toyota
18	Harrison Burton (R)	Kyle Busch Motorsports	Toyota
20	Landon Huffman	Young's Motorsports	Chevrolet
21	Sam Mayer (R)	GMS Racing	Chevrolet
22	Austin Wayne Self	AM Racing	Chevrolet
24	Brett Moffitt	GMS Racing	Chevrolet
30	Brennan Poole (R)	On Point Motorsports	Toyota
33	Ryan Sieg (i)	Reaume Brothers Racing	Chevrolet
34	J. J. Yeley (i)	Reaume Brothers Racing	Toyota
44	Angela Ruch	Niece Motorsports	Chevrolet
45	Ross Chastain	Niece Motorsports	Chevrolet
46	Raphaël Lessard	Kyle Busch Motorsports	Toyota
51	Chandler Smith	Kyle Busch Motorsports	Toyota
52	Stewart Friesen	Halmar Friesen Racing	Chevrolet
54	Natalie Decker (R)	DGR-Crosley	Toyota
56	Timmy Hill (i)	Hill Motorsports	Chevrolet
68	Clay Greenfield	Clay Greenfield Motorsports	Toyota
74	Lou Goss	Lou Goss Racing	Chevrolet
75	Parker Kligerman	Henderson Motorsports	Chevrolet
88	Matt Crafton	ThorSport Racing	Ford
92	Timothy Peters	RBR Enterprises	Ford
97	Jesse Little	JJL Motorsports	Ford
98	Grant Enfinger	ThorSport Racing	Ford
99	Ben Rhodes	ThorSport Racing	Ford

== Practice ==
=== First practice ===
Tyler Ankrum was the fastest in the first practice session with a time of 15.178 seconds and a speed of 126.420 mph (203.453 km/h).

Pos	No.	Driver	Team	Manufacturer	Time	Speed
1	17	Tyler Ankrum (R)	DGR-Crosley	Toyota	15.178	126.420
2	45	Ross Chastain	Niece Motorsports	Chevrolet	15.249	125.831
3	88	Matt Crafton	ThorSport Racing	Ford	15.307	125.354

=== Final practice ===
Austin Hill was the fastest in the final practice session with a time of 15.189 seconds and a speed of 126.328 mph (203.305 km/h).

Pos	No.	Driver	Team	Manufacturer	Time	Speed
1	16	Austin Hill	Hattori Racing Enterprises	Toyota	15.189	126.328
2	21	Sam Mayer (R)	GMS Racing	Chevrolet	15.217	126.096
3	24	Brett Moffitt	GMS Racing	Chevrolet	15.254	125.790

== Qualifying ==
Brett Moffitt scored the pole for the race with a time of 15.027 seconds and a speed of 127.690 mph (205.497 km/h).

=== Qualifying results ===
Pos	No	Driver	Team	Manufacturer	Time
1	24	Brett Moffitt	GMS Racing	Chevrolet	15.027
2	45	Ross Chastain	Niece Motorsports	Chevrolet	15.102
3	52	Stewart Friesen	Halmar Friesen Racing	Chevrolet	15.157
4	99	Ben Rhodes	ThorSport Racing	Ford	15.197
5	17	Tyler Ankrum (R)	DGR-Crosley	Toyota	15.242
6	13	Johnny Sauter	ThorSport Racing	Ford	15.245
7	51	Chandler Smith	Kyle Busch Motorsports	Toyota	15.304
8	16	Austin Hill	Hattori Racing Enterprises	Toyota	15.307
9	30	Brennan Poole (R)	On Point Motorsports	Toyota	15.313
10	18	Harrison Burton (R)	Kyle Busch Motorsports	Toyota	15.345
11	88	Matt Crafton	ThorSport Racing	Ford	15.371
12	75	Parker Kligerman	Henderson Motorsports	Chevrolet	15.388
13	8	John Hunter Nemechek (i)	NEMCO Motorsports	Chevrolet	15.409
14	98	Grant Enfinger	ThorSport Racing	Ford	15.439
15	15	Dylan Lupton	DGR-Crosley	Toyota	15.462
16	46	Raphaël Lessard	Kyle Busch Motorsports	Toyota	15.493
17	4	Todd Gilliland	Kyle Busch Motorsports	Toyota	15.501
18	21	Sam Mayer (R)	GMS Racing	Chevrolet	15.502
19	02	Tyler Dippel (R)	Young's Motorsports	Chevrolet	15.532
20	54	Natalie Decker (R)	DGR-Crosley	Toyota	15.543
21	68	Clay Greenfield	Clay Greenfield Motorsports	Toyota	15.607
22	97	Jesse Little	JJL Motorsports	Ford	15.612
23	12	Gus Dean (R)	Young's Motorsports	Chevrolet	15.624
24	2	Sheldon Creed (R)	GMS Racing	Chevrolet	15.643
25	22	Austin Wayne Self	AM Racing	Chevrolet	15.660
26	33	Ryan Sieg (i)	Reaume Brothers Racing	Chevrolet	15.726
27	56	Timmy Hill (i)	Hill Motorsports	Chevrolet	15.755
28	20	Landon Huffman	Young's Motorsports	Chevrolet	15.845
29	34	J. J. Yeley (i)	Reaume Brothers Racing	Toyota	15.977
30	3	Jordan Anderson	Jordan Anderson Racing	Chevrolet	16.123
31	10	Jennifer Jo Cobb	Jennifer Jo Cobb Racing	Chevrolet	16.438
32	44	Angela Ruch	Niece Motorsports	Chevrolet	16.544
Did not qualify
33	9	Codie Rohrbaugh	CR7 Motorsports	Chevrolet	15.803
34	04	Cory Roper	Roper Racing	Ford	15.917
35	92	Timothy Peters	RBR Enterprises	Ford	16.173
36	74	Lou Goss	Lou Goss Racing	Chevrolet	17.124

. – Playoffs driver

== Race ==
=== Summary ===
Brett Moffitt started from the pole, and was locked in a fierce battle with Ross Chastain throughout Stage 1. Chastain led 78 laps and edged out Moffitt to claim the stage victory. Chastain was penalized for a pit road safety violation during stage 2. The roles switched in stage 2 saw a dramatic ending to the stage between Moffitt, Chastain, and Chandler Smith. In the end, Moffitt took advantage of lapped trucks and edged out Chastain for the win.

Grant Enfinger and Sheldon Creed stayed out at the end of stage 2, while the leaders pitted. With a number of cautions, Enfinger managed to stay in the lead but was eventually passed by Moffitt on lap 173. Near the end of the race, Natalie Decker was spun around by a tow truck after being collected in a wreck with Gus Dean and Tyler Dippel. The final caution flew on lap 194 when Sam Mayer (in his first career start) hit the wall after contact with Ben Rhodes. On the restart, Moffitt and Smith had a brief side-by-side battle before Moffitt pulled away on the final lap and held off Smith to win the race, also locking himself into the next round of the playoffs.

After the race, Chastain was visibly upset at Raphaël Lessard and confronted him after the drivers exited their trucks, which ultimately led to the crew members being involved in attempting to calm them down.

=== Stage Results ===
Stage One Laps: 55

Pos	No	Driver	Team	Manufacturer	Points
1	45	Ross Chastain	Niece Motorsports	Chevrolet	10
2	24	Brett Moffitt	GMS Racing	Chevrolet	9
3	13	Johnny Sauter	ThorSport Racing	Ford	8
4	99	Ben Rhodes	ThorSport Racing	Ford	7
5	51	Chandler Smith	Kyle Busch Motorsports	Toyota	6
6	88	Matt Crafton	ThorSport Racing	Ford	5
7	52	Stewart Friesen	Halmar Friesen Racing	Chevrolet	4
8	17	Tyler Ankrum (R)	DGR-Crosley	Toyota	3
9	8	John Hunter Nemechek (i)	NEMCO Motorsports	Chevrolet	0
10	16	Austin Hill	Hattori Racing Enterprises	Toyota	1

Stage Two Laps: 55

Pos	No	Driver	Team	Manufacturer	Points
1	24	Brett Moffitt	GMS Racing	Chevrolet	10
2	45	Ross Chastain	Niece Motorsports	Chevrolet	9
3	51	Chandler Smith	Kyle Busch Motorsports	Toyota	8
4	88	Matt Crafton	ThorSport Racing	Ford	7
5	52	Stewart Friesen	Halmar Friesen Racing	Chevrolet	6
6	17	Tyler Ankrum (R)	DGR-Crosley	Toyota	5
7	99	Ben Rhodes	ThorSport Racing	Ford	4
8	46	Raphaël Lessard	Kyle Busch Motorsports	Toyota	3
9	98	Grant Enfinger	ThorSport Racing	Ford	2
10	21	Sam Mayer (R)	GMS Racing	Chevrolet	1

=== Final Stage Results ===
Stage Three Laps: 90

Pos	Grid	No	Driver	Team	Manufacturer	Laps	Points
1	1	24	Brett Moffitt	GMS Racing	Chevrolet	200	59
2	7	51	Chandler Smith	Kyle Busch Motorsports	Toyota	200	49
3	2	45	Ross Chastain	Niece Motorsports	Chevrolet	200	53
4	3	52	Stewart Friesen	Halmar Friesen Racing	Chevrolet	200	43
5	14	98	Grant Enfinger	ThorSport Racing	Ford	200	34
6	24	2	Sheldon Creed (R)	GMS Racing	Toyota	200	31
7	11	88	Matt Crafton	ThorSport Racing	Ford	200	42
8	4	99	Ben Rhodes	ThorSport Racing	Ford	200	40
9	17	4	Todd Gilliland	Kyle Busch Motorsports	Toyota	200	28
10	8	16	Austin Hill	Hattori Racing Enterprises	Toyota	200	28
11	6	13	Johnny Sauter	ThorSport Racing	Ford	200	34
12	16	46	Raphaël Lessard	Kyle Busch Motorsports	Toyota	200	28
13	12	75	Parker Kligerman	Henderson Motorsports	Chevrolet	200	24
14	26	33	Ryan Sieg (i)	Reaume Brothers Racing	Chevrolet	200	0
15	25	22	Austin Wayne Self	AM Racing	Chevrolet	200	22
16	28	20	Landon Huffman	Young's Motorsports	Chevrolet	200	21
17	27	56	Timmy Hill (i)	Hill Motorsports	Chevrolet	200	0
18	23	12	Gus Dean (R)	Young's Motorsports	Chevrolet	200	19
19	9	30	Brennan Poole (R)	On Point Motorsports	Toyota	199	18
20	5	17	Tyler Ankrum (R)	DGR-Crosley	Toyota	194	25
21	18	21	Sam Mayer (R)	GMS Racing	Chevrolet	193	17
22	31	10	Jennifer Jo Cobb	Jennifer Jo Cobb Racing	Chevrolet	193	15
23	10	18	Harrison Burton (R)	Kyle Busch Motorsports	Toyota	192	14
24	19	02	Tyler Dippel (R)	Young's Motorsports	Chevrolet	175	13
25	20	54	Natalie Decker (R)	DGR-Crosley	Toyota	166	12
26	21	68	Clay Greenfield	Clay Greenfield Motorsports	Toyota	145	11
27	15	15	Dylan Lupton	DGR-Crosley	Toyota	136	10
28	30	3	Jordan Anderson	Jordan Anderson Racing	Chevrolet	102	9
29	13	8	John Hunter Nemechek (i)	NEMCO Motorsports	Chevrolet	75	0
30	32	44	Angela Ruch	Niece Motorsports	Chevrolet	65	7
31	29	34	J. J. Yeley (i)	Reaume Brothers Racing	Toyota	12	0
32	22	97	Jesse Little	JJL Motorsports	Ford	2	5

. – Driver advanced to the next round of the playoffs.

. – Playoffs driver

Previous race: 2019 Corrigan Oil 200	NASCAR Gander Outdoors Truck Series; 2019 season	Next race: 2019 Chevrolet Silverado 250
