= 2019 CarShield 200 =

Race details
- Race 11 of 23 in the 2019 NASCAR Gander Outdoors Truck Series season
- Date: June 22, 2019
- Location: World Wide Technology Raceway at Gateway in Madison, Illinois
- Course: Permanent racing facility
- Course length: 1.25 miles (2.01 km)
- Distance: 160 laps, 200 mi (321.869 km)

Pole position
Driver	Christian Eckes	Kyle Busch Motorsports
- Time: N/A

Most laps led
Driver	Christian Eckes	Kyle Busch Motorsports
- Laps: 57

Winner
No. 45	Ross Chastain	Niece Motorsports

Television in the United States
- Network: FS1

Radio in the United States
- Radio: MRN

The 2019 CarShield 200 is a NASCAR Gander Outdoors Truck Series race held on June 22, 2019, at World Wide Technology Raceway at Gateway in Madison, Illinois. Contested over 160 laps on the 1.25-mile (2.01 km) oval, it was the 11th race of the 2019 NASCAR Gander Outdoors Truck Series season.

== Background ==
=== Track ===
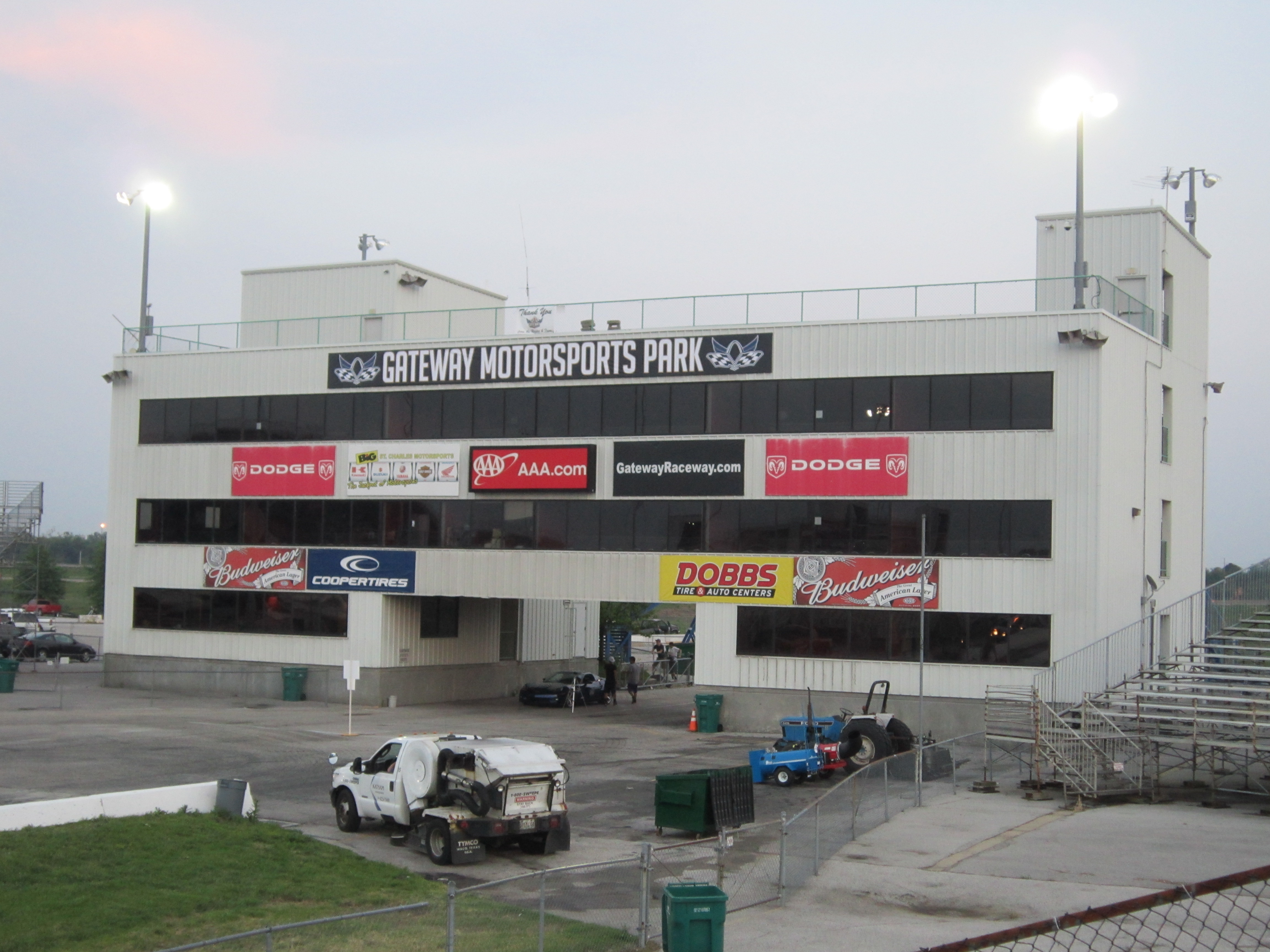
Tower at World Wide Technology Raceway in 2012, the track where the race was held.

Known as Gateway Motorsports Park until its renaming in April 2019, World Wide Technology Raceway is a 1.25-mile (2.01 km) paved oval motor racing track in Madison, Illinois, United States. The track previously held Truck races from 1998 to 2010, and returned starting in 2014. In conjunction with the Truck Series, the ARCA Menards Series held a support race earlier in the night.

CarShield was the race's title sponsor for 2019.

== Entry list ==
After intentionally wrecking Austin Hill under caution at the previous week's M&M's 200 at Iowa Speedway, Johnny Sauter was suspended for the Gateway race. Myatt Snider replaced him in the No. 13 ThorSport Racing truck.

No.	Driver	Team	Manufacturer
0	Greg Rayl	Jennifer Jo Cobb Racing	Chevrolet
1	Cody McMahan	Beaver Motorsports	Chevrolet
02	Tyler Dippel (R)	Young's Motorsports	Chevrolet
2	Sheldon Creed (R)	GMS Racing	Chevrolet
3	Jordan Anderson	Jordan Anderson Racing	Chevrolet
4	Todd Gilliland	Kyle Busch Motorsports	Toyota
6	Norm Benning	Norm Benning Racing	Chevrolet
8	Camden Murphy	NEMCO Motorsports	Chevrolet
10	Jennifer Jo Cobb	Jennifer Jo Cobb Racing	Chevrolet
12	Gus Dean (R)	Young's Motorsports	Chevrolet
13	Myatt Snider	ThorSport Racing	Ford
16	Austin Hill	Hattori Racing Enterprises	Toyota
17	Anthony Alfredo (R)	DGR-Crosley	Toyota
18	Harrison Burton (R)	Kyle Busch Motorsports	Toyota
20	Spencer Boyd (R)	Young's Motorsports	Chevrolet
22	Austin Wayne Self	AM Racing	Chevrolet
24	Brett Moffitt	GMS Racing	Chevrolet
32	Daniel Sasnett	Reaume Brothers Racing	Toyota
33	Josh Reaume	Reaume Brothers Racing	Chevrolet
34	Bryant Barnhill	Reaume Brothers Racing	Chevrolet
42	Chad Finley	Chad Finley Racing	Chevrolet
44	Kyle Benjamin	Niece Motorsports	Chevrolet
45	Ross Chastain	Niece Motorsports	Chevrolet
46	Chandler Smith	Kyle Busch Motorsports	Toyota
51	Christian Eckes	Kyle Busch Motorsports	Toyota
52	Stewart Friesen	Halmar Friesen Racing	Chevrolet
54	Natalie Decker (R)	DGR-Crosley	Toyota
74	Lou Goss	Lou Goss Racing	Chevrolet
87	Tyler Ankrum (R)	NEMCO Motorsports	Chevrolet
88	Matt Crafton	ThorSport Racing	Ford
97	Jesse Little	JJL Motorsports	Ford
98	Grant Enfinger	ThorSport Racing	Ford
99	Ben Rhodes	ThorSport Racing	Ford

== Practice ==
Only one practice session was held as rain caused the other to be cancelled.

=== Final practice ===
Stewart Friesen was the fastest in the practice session with a time of 32.911 seconds and a speed of 136.732 mph (220.049 km/h).

Pos	No.	Driver	Team	Manufacturer	Time	Speed
1	52	Stewart Friesen	Halmar Friesen Racing	Chevrolet	32.911	136.732
2	4	Todd Gilliland	Kyle Busch Motorsports	Toyota	33.046	136.174
3	51	Christian Eckes	Kyle Busch Motorsports	Toyota	33.069	136.079

== Qualifying ==
Qualifying was cancelled due to rain. The starting lineup was determined by owner's points, awarding the pole to Christian Eckes.

=== Qualifying results ===
Pos	No	Driver	Team	Manufacturer	Time
1	51	Christian Eckes	Kyle Busch Motorsports	Toyota	0.000
2	98	Grant Enfinger	ThorSport Racing	Ford	0.000
3	88	Matt Crafton	ThorSport Racing	Ford	0.000
4	52	Stewart Friesen	Halmar Friesen Racing	Chevrolet	0.000
5	24	Brett Moffitt	GMS Racing	Chevrolet	0.000
6	99	Ben Rhodes	ThorSport Racing	Ford	0.000
7	45	Ross Chastain	Niece Motorsports	Chevrolet	0.000
8	18	Harrison Burton (R)	Kyle Busch Motorsports	Toyota	0.000
9	16	Austin Hill	Hattori Racing Enterprises	Toyota	0.000
10	13	Myatt Snider	ThorSport Racing	Ford	0.000
11	4	Todd Gilliland	Kyle Busch Motorsports	Toyota	0.000
12	2	Sheldon Creed (R)	GMS Racing	Chevrolet	0.000
13	17	Anthony Alfredo (R)	DGR-Crosley	Toyota	0.000
14	02	Tyler Dippel (R)	Young's Motorsports	Chevrolet	0.000
15	22	Austin Wayne Self	AM Racing	Chevrolet	0.000
16	20	Spencer Boyd (R)	Young's Motorsports	Chevrolet	0.000
17	3	Jordan Anderson	Jordan Anderson Racing	Chevrolet	0.000
18	44	Kyle Benjamin	Niece Motorsports	Chevrolet	0.000
19	12	Gus Dean (R)	Young's Motorsports	Chevrolet	0.000
20	54	Natalie Decker (R)	DGR-Crosley	Toyota	0.000
21	33	Josh Reaume	Reaume Brothers Racing	Chevrolet	0.000
22	8	Camden Murphy	NEMCO Motorsports	Chevrolet	0.000
23	34	Bryant Barnhill	Reaume Brothers Racing	Chevrolet	0.000
24	97	Jesse Little	JJL Motorsports	Ford	0.000
25	46	Chandler Smith	Kyle Busch Motorsports	Toyota	0.000
26	10	Jennifer Jo Cobb	Jennifer Jo Cobb Racing	Chevrolet	0.000
27	6	Norm Benning	Norm Benning Racing	Chevrolet	0.000
28	87	Tyler Ankrum (R)	NEMCO Motorsports	Chevrolet	0.000
29	0	Greg Rayl	Jennifer Jo Cobb Racing	Chevrolet	0.000
30	32	Daniel Sasnett	Reaume Brothers Racing	Toyota	0.000
31	1	Cody McMahan	Beaver Motorsports	Chevrolet	0.000
32	74	Lou Goss	Lou Goss Racing	Chevrolet	0.000

== Race ==
=== Summary ===
Christian Eckes began on pole. Greg Rayl crashed into the wall in lap 3, ending his day and causing the first caution. Grant Enfinger won the Stage 1. As the stage ended, Ross Chastain and Matt Crafton battled for position, resulting in Crafton making contact with Chastain after the flag flew to end the stage.

Stage 2 was also won by Enfinger, who led the entire stage to score his third stage win of the season. He held off Myatt Snider, who was driving in place of the suspended Johnny Sauter. On lap 78, Natalie Decker crashed into the wall hard, ending her day and resulting in her fifth DNF of the year.

Harrison Burton and Sheldon Creed made contact with 15 laps remaining. Burton slid the rear end of his truck into the wall, receiving significant damage. He continued racing, though barely managing to stay on the lead lap.

The final restart took place with seven laps to go. On the restart, Chastain (who did not get tires during the lengthy caution) spun his tires, but received a helpful push from Todd Gilliland. Chastain cleared Eckes, and fended him off even though Eckes had fresher tires.

On the final lap, Eckes was passed by Gilliland and spun by Stewart Friesen. The caution was not thrown, causing Eckes to lose many positions. Chastain managed to hold off Gilliland to win the race. His truck passed inspection, redeeming himself from his stripped win in the previous week's race.

=== Stage Results ===
Stage One Laps: 35

Pos	No	Driver	Team	Manufacturer	Points
1	98	Grant Enfinger	ThorSport Racing	Ford	10
2	52	Stewart Friesen	Halmar Friesen Racing	Chevrolet	9
3	99	Ben Rhodes	ThorSport Racing	Ford	8
4	18	Harrison Burton (R)	Kyle Busch Motorsports	Toyota	7
5	51	Christian Eckes	Kyle Busch Motorsports	Toyota	6
6	45	Ross Chastain	Niece Motorsports	Chevrolet	5
7	2	Sheldon Creed (R)	GMS Racing	Chevrolet	4
8	88	Matt Crafton	ThorSport Racing	Ford	3
9	13	Myatt Snider	ThorSport Racing	Ford	2
10	24	Brett Moffitt	GMS Racing	Chevrolet	1

Stage Two Laps: 35

Pos	No	Driver	Team	Manufacturer	Points
1	98	Grant Enfinger	ThorSport Racing	Ford	10
2	13	Myatt Snider	ThorSport Racing	Ford	9
3	88	Matt Crafton	ThorSport Racing	Ford	8
4	51	Christian Eckes	Kyle Busch Motorsports	Toyota	7
5	2	Sheldon Creed (R)	GMS Racing	Chevrolet	6
6	99	Ben Rhodes	ThorSport Racing	Ford	5
7	4	Todd Gilliland	Kyle Busch Motorsports	Toyota	4
8	52	Stewart Friesen	Halmar Friesen Racing	Chevrolet	3
9	46	Chandler Smith	Kyle Busch Motorsports	Toyota	2
10	16	Austin Hill	Hattori Racing Enterprises	Toyota	1

=== Final Stage Results ===
Stage Three Laps: 90

Pos	Grid	No	Driver	Team	Manufacturer	Laps	Points
1	7	45	Ross Chastain	Niece Motorsports	Chevrolet	160	45
2	11	4	Todd Gilliland	Kyle Busch Motorsports	Toyota	160	39
3	4	52	Stewart Friesen	Halmar Friesen Racing	Chevrolet	160	46
4	25	46	Chandler Smith	Kyle Busch Motorsports	Toyota	160	35
5	5	24	Brett Moffitt	GMS Racing	Chevrolet	160	33
6	2	98	Grant Enfinger	ThorSport Racing	Ford	160	51
7	12	2	Sheldon Creed (R)	GMS Racing	Chevrolet	160	40
8	6	99	Ben Rhodes	ThorSport Racing	Ford	160	42
9	3	88	Matt Crafton	ThorSport Racing	Ford	160	39
10	10	13	Myatt Snider	ThorSport Racing	Ford	160	38
11	9	16	Austin Hill	Hattori Racing Enterprises	Toyota	160	27
12	13	17	Anthony Alfredo (R)	DGR-Crosley	Toyota	160	25
13	18	44	Kyle Benjamin	Niece Motorsports	Chevrolet	160	24
14	1	51	Christian Eckes	Kyle Busch Motorsports	Toyota	160	36
15	14	02	Tyler Dippel (R)	Young's Motorsports	Chevrolet	160	22
16	8	18	Harrison Burton (R)	Kyle Busch Motorsports	Toyota	160	28
17	15	22	Austin Wayne Self	AM Racing	Chevrolet	159	20
18	17	3	Jordan Anderson	Jordan Anderson Racing	Chevrolet	159	19
19	19	12	Gus Dean (R)	Young's Motorsports	Chevrolet	158	18
20	16	20	Spencer Boyd (R)	Young's Motorsports	Chevrolet	158	17
21	24	97	Jesse Little	JJL Motorsports	Ford	158	16
22	23	34	Bryant Barnhill	Reaume Brothers Racing	Chevrolet	155	15
23	21	33	Josh Reaume	Reaume Brothers Racing	Chevrolet	154	14
24	26	10	Jennifer Jo Cobb	Jennifer Jo Cobb Racing	Chevrolet	153	13
25	27	6	Norm Benning	Norm Benning Racing	Chevrolet	150	12
26	30	32	Daniel Sasnett	Reaume Brothers Racing	Toyota	80	11
27	20	54	Natalie Decker (R)	DGR-Crosley	Toyota	78	10
28	22	8	Camden Murphy	NEMCO Motorsports	Chevrolet	47	9
29	31	1	Cody McMahan	Beaver Motorsports	Chevrolet	32	8
30	28	87	Tyler Ankrum (R)	NEMCO Motorsports	Chevrolet	14	7
31	32	74	Lou Goss	Lou Goss Racing	Chevrolet	12	6
32	29	0	Greg Rayl	Jennifer Jo Cobb Racing	Chevrolet	2	5

Previous race: 2019 M&M's 200	NASCAR Gander Outdoors Truck Series; 2019 season	Next race: 2019 Camping World 225
