= 2019 Corrigan Oil 200 =

Race details
- Race 16 of 23 in the 2019 NASCAR Gander Outdoors Truck Series season
- Date: August 10, 2019
- Location: Michigan International Speedway in Brooklyn, Michigan
- Course: Permanent racing facility
- Course length: 2 miles (3.219 km)
- Distance: 105 laps, 210 mi (337.962 km)
- Scheduled distance: 100 laps, 200 mi (321.869 km)

Pole position
Driver	Ross Chastain	Niece Motorsports
- Time: 39.179

Most laps led
Driver	Austin Hill	Hattori Racing Enterprises
- Laps: 26

Winner
No. 16	Austin Hill	Hattori Racing Enterprises

Television in the United States
- Network: FS1

Radio in the United States
- Radio: MRN

The 2019 Corrigan Oil 200 was a NASCAR Gander Outdoors Truck Series race held on August 10, 2019, at Michigan International Speedway in Brooklyn, Michigan. Contested over 105 laps due to an overtime finish on the two-mile (3.2 km) D-shaped oval, it was the 16th race of the 2019 NASCAR Gander Outdoors Truck Series season, and the final race of the regular season before the playoffs.

== Background ==
=== Track ===
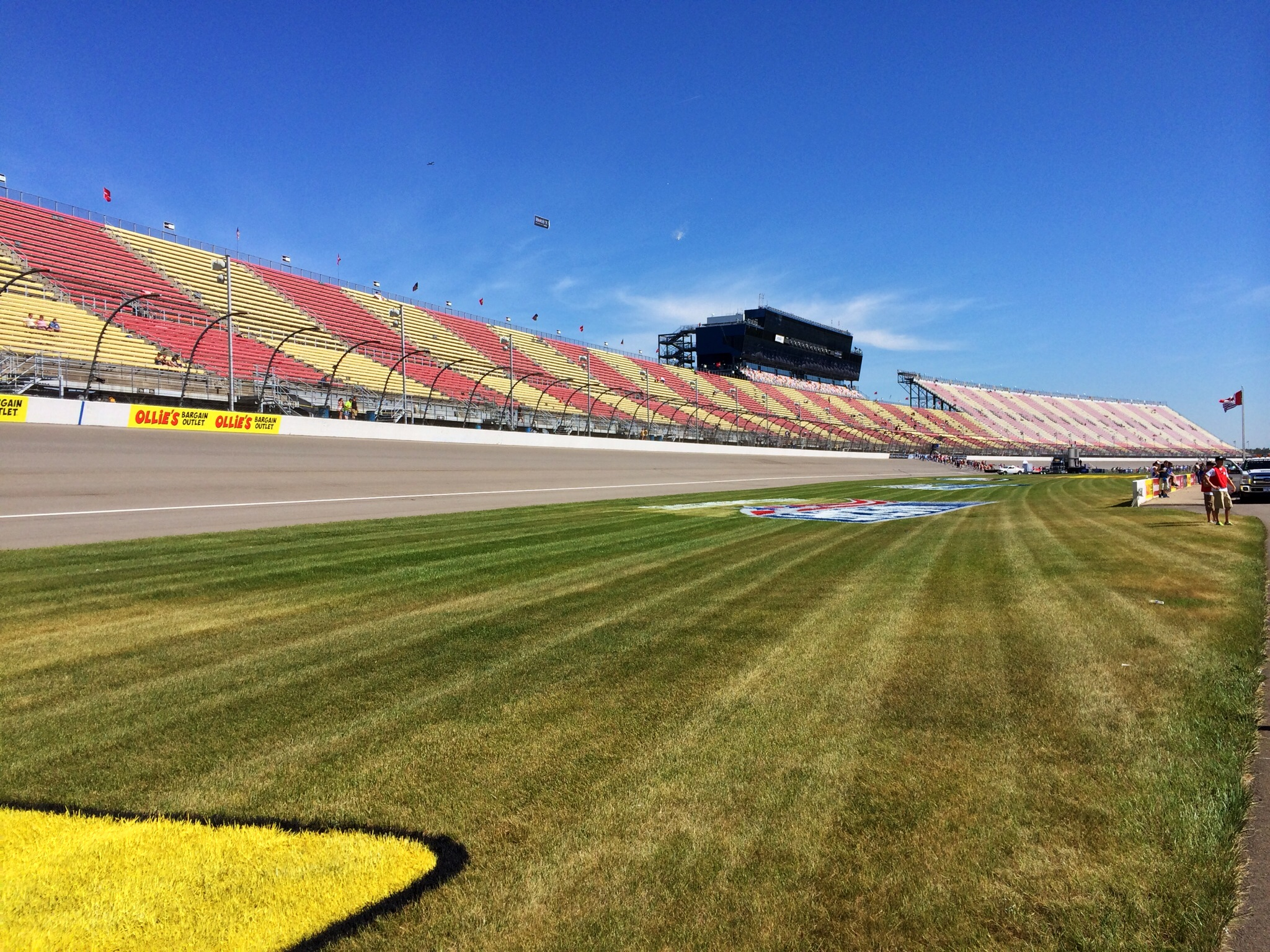
Michigan International Speedway

Michigan International Speedway (MIS) is a two-mile (3.2 km) moderate-banked D-shaped speedway located off U.S. Highway 12 on more than 1,400 acres (5.7 km^{2}) approximately four miles (6.4 km) south of the village of Brooklyn, in the scenic Irish Hills area of southeastern Michigan. The track is used primarily for NASCAR events. It is sometimes known as a "sister track" to Texas World Speedway, and was used as the basis of Auto Club Speedway. The track is owned by International Speedway Corporation (ISC). Michigan International Speedway is recognized as one of motorsports' premier facilities because of its wide racing surface and high banking (by open-wheel standards; the 18-degree banking is modest by stock car standards). Michigan is the fastest track in NASCAR due to its wide, sweeping corners and long straightaways; typical qualifying speeds are in excess of 200 mph (320 km/h) and corner entry speeds are anywhere from 215 to 220 mph (346 to 354 km/h) after the 2012 repaving of the track.

== Entry list ==
No.	Driver	Team	Manufacturer
0	Daniel Sasnett	Jennifer Jo Cobb Racing	Chevrolet
2	Sheldon Creed (R)	GMS Racing	Chevrolet
3	Jordan Anderson	Jordan Anderson Racing	Chevrolet
4	Todd Gilliland	Kyle Busch Motorsports	Toyota
6	Norm Benning	Norm Benning Racing	Chevrolet
8	Joe Nemechek	NEMCO Motorsports	Chevrolet
9	Codie Rohrbaugh	Grant County Mulch Racing	Chevrolet
02	Tyler Dippel (R)	Young's Motorsports	Chevrolet
04	Cory Roper	Roper Racing	Ford
10	Jennifer Jo Cobb	Jennifer Jo Cobb Racing	Chevrolet
12	Gus Dean (R)	Young's Motorsports	Chevrolet
13	Johnny Sauter	ThorSport Racing	Ford
14	Trey Hutchens	Trey Hutchens Racing	Chevrolet
15	Anthony Alfredo (R)	DGR-Crosley	Toyota
16	Austin Hill	Hattori Racing Enterprises	Toyota
17	Tyler Ankrum (R)	DGR-Crosley	Toyota
18	Harrison Burton (R)	Kyle Busch Motorsports	Toyota
20	Spencer Boyd	Young's Motorsports	Chevrolet
22	Austin Wayne Self	AM Racing	Chevrolet
24	Brett Moffitt	GMS Racing	Chevrolet
33	Josh Reaume	Reaume Brothers Racing	Toyota
34	Jesse Iwuji	Reaume Brothers Racing	Chevrolet
38	T. J. Bell	Niece Motorsports	Chevrolet
44	Bayley Currey	Niece Motorsports	Chevrolet
45	Ross Chastain	Niece Motorsports	Chevrolet
49	Ray Ciccarelli	CMI Motorsports	Chevrolet
51	Christian Eckes	Kyle Busch Motorsports	Toyota
52	Stewart Friesen	Halmar Friesen Racing	Chevrolet
54	Natalie Decker (R)	DGR-Crosley	Toyota
87	Camden Murphy	NEMCO Motorsports	Chevrolet
88	Matt Crafton	ThorSport Racing	Ford
98	Grant Enfinger	ThorSport Racing	Ford
99	Ben Rhodes	ThorSport Racing	Ford

== Practice ==
=== First practice ===
Ross Chastain was the fastest in the first practice session with a time of 38.724 seconds and a speed of 185.931 mph (299.227 km/h).

Pos	No.	Driver	Team	Manufacturer	Time	Speed
1	45	Ross Chastain	Niece Motorsports	Chevrolet	38.724	185.931
2	24	Brett Moffitt	GMS Racing	Chevrolet	38.993	184.649
3	99	Ben Rhodes	ThorSport Racing	Ford	39.003	184.601

=== Final practice ===
Christian Eckes was the fastest in the final practice session with a time of 39.081 seconds and a speed of 184.233 mph (296.494 km/h).

Pos	No.	Driver	Team	Manufacturer	Time	Speed
1	51	Christian Eckes	Kyle Busch Motorsports	Toyota	39.081	184.233
2	45	Ross Chastain	Niece Motorsports	Chevrolet	39.087	184.204
3	99	Ben Rhodes	ThorSport Racing	Ford	39.110	184.096

== Qualifying ==
Ross Chastain scored the pole for the race with a time of 39.179 seconds and a speed of 183.772 mph (295.752 km/h).

=== Qualifying results ===
Pos	No	Driver	Team	Manufacturer	Time
1	45	Ross Chastain	Niece Motorsports	Chevrolet	39.179
2	51	Christian Eckes	Kyle Busch Motorsports	Toyota	39.187
3	17	Tyler Ankrum (R)	DGR-Crosley	Toyota	39.251
4	4	Todd Gilliland	Kyle Busch Motorsports	Toyota	39.287
5	18	Harrison Burton (R)	Kyle Busch Motorsports	Toyota	39.299
6	16	Austin Hill	Hattori Racing Enterprises	Toyota	39.324
7	99	Ben Rhodes	ThorSport Racing	Ford	39.332
8	24	Brett Moffitt	GMS Racing	Chevrolet	39.345
9	98	Grant Enfinger	ThorSport Racing	Ford	39.378
10	8	Joe Nemechek	NEMCO Motorsports	Chevrolet	39.380
11	44	Bayley Currey	Niece Motorsports	Chevrolet	39.438
12	88	Matt Crafton	ThorSport Racing	Ford	39.459
13	3	Jordan Anderson	Jordan Anderson Racing	Chevrolet	39.493
14	13	Johnny Sauter	ThorSport Racing	Ford	39.523
15	04	Cory Roper	Roper Racing	Ford	39.558
16	54	Natalie Decker (R)	DGR-Crosley	Toyota	39.578
17	02	Tyler Dippel (R)	Young's Motorsports	Chevrolet	39.597
18	2	Sheldon Creed (R)	GMS Racing	Chevrolet	39.601
19	15	Anthony Alfredo (R)	DGR-Crosley	Toyota	39.620
20	52	Stewart Friesen	Halmar Friesen Racing	Chevrolet	39.622
21	9	Codie Rohrbaugh	Grant County Mulch Racing	Chevrolet	39.706
22	12	Gus Dean (R)	Young's Motorsports	Chevrolet	39.754
23	22	Austin Wayne Self	AM Racing	Chevrolet	39.801
24	14	Trey Hutchens	Trey Hutchens Racing	Chevrolet	39.947
25	87	Camden Murphy	NEMCO Motorsports	Chevrolet	40.068
26	38	T. J. Bell	Niece Motorsports	Chevrolet	40.324
27	20	Spencer Boyd	Young's Motorsports	Chevrolet	40.400
28	34	Jesse Iwuji	Reaume Brothers Racing	Chevrolet	40.844
29	33	Josh Reaume	Reaume Brothers Racing	Toyota	40.987
30	49	Ray Ciccarelli	CMI Motorsports	Chevrolet	41.163
31	10	Jennifer Jo Cobb	Jennifer Jo Cobb Racing	Chevrolet	43.238
32	6	Norm Benning	Norm Benning Racing	Chevrolet	0.000
Did not qualify
33	0	Daniel Sasnett	Jennifer Jo Cobb Racing	Chevrolet	0.000

== Race ==
=== Summary ===
Ross Chastain started on pole and led all 20 laps of Stage 1. His day ended early after contact between Johnny Sauter and Codie Rohrbaugh on pit road severely damaged Chastain's truck as it sent Rohrbaugh's truck into Chastain going onto pit road.

Ben Rhodes assumed the race lead and held it until Christian Eckes spun and brought out the first caution on lap 33. Rhodes and many of the leaders pitted for tires and fuel, but Brett Moffitt stayed out, beating Austin Hill during the final laps of Stage 2.

When the final stage began, Sheldon Creed and Rhodes (who were both playoff contenders) battled fiercely, exchanging the lead multiple times until Cory Roper slammed the wall on lap 57 and brought out the yellow. Moffitt stayed out again and assumed the race lead on the restart, but was passed by Todd Gilliland later on that lap.

The caution was brought out again on lap 66 when Rohrbaugh spun, prompting Moffitt to pit while Gilliland stayed out. Gilliland and Rhodes battled for the race lead from the lap 70 restart up until lap 76, when they made contact while blocking each other. This caused Gilliland to drop from the lead to sixth, while Rhodes was forced to pit after cutting a tire. Hill inherited the lead afterwards, battling with Tyler Ankrum through two cautions for Eckes spinning twice on lap 86 and lap 93.

On lap 97, Ankrum took the lead on the restart but spun his tires while Matt Crafton was pushing him, sending his truck spinning into oncoming traffic on the frontstretch, destroying the three DGR-Crosley cars while also taking Gilliland out of playoff contention.

Afterwards, Hill held off a charging Creed to win the final race of the 2019 regular season. Grant Enfinger captured the regular season championship by the end of Stage 1, securing 15 playoff points. Due to Hill's win, Crafton took the final playoff spot on points over Rhodes, Creed, Tyler Dippel, and Harrison Burton.

=== Stage Results ===
Stage One Laps: 20

Pos	No	Driver	Team	Manufacturer	Points
1	45	Ross Chastain	Niece Motorsports	Chevrolet	10
2	99	Ben Rhodes	ThorSport Racing	Ford	9
3	51	Christian Eckes	Kyle Busch Motorsports	Toyota	8
4	24	Brett Moffitt	GMS Racing	Chevrolet	7
5	4	Todd Gilliland	Kyle Busch Motorsports	Toyota	6
6	98	Grant Enfinger	ThorSport Racing	Ford	5
7	16	Austin Hill	Hattori Racing Enterprises	Toyota	4
8	18	Harrison Burton (R)	Kyle Busch Motorsports	Toyota	3
9	13	Johnny Sauter	ThorSport Racing	Ford	2
10	88	Matt Crafton	ThorSport Racing	Ford	1

Stage Two Laps: 20

Pos	No	Driver	Team	Manufacturer	Points
1	24	Brett Moffitt	GMS Racing	Chevrolet	10
2	16	Austin Hill	Hattori Racing Enterprises	Toyota	9
3	98	Grant Enfinger	ThorSport Racing	Ford	8
4	3	Jordan Anderson	Jordan Anderson Racing	Chevrolet	7
5	99	Ben Rhodes	ThorSport Racing	Ford	6
6	22	Austin Wayne Self	AM Racing	Chevrolet	5
7	12	Gus Dean (R)	Young's Motorsports	Chevrolet	4
8	4	Todd Gilliland	Kyle Busch Motorsports	Toyota	3
9	2	Sheldon Creed (R)	GMS Racing	Chevrolet	2
10	44	Bayley Currey	Niece Motorsports	Chevrolet	1

=== Final Stage Results ===
Stage Three Laps: 65

Pos	Grid	No	Driver	Team	Manufacturer	Laps	Points
1	6	16	Austin Hill	Hattori Racing Enterprises	Toyota	105	53
2	18	2	Sheldon Creed (R)	GMS Racing	Chevrolet	105	37
3	17	02	Tyler Dippel (R)	Young's Motorsports	Chevrolet	105	34
4	8	24	Brett Moffitt	GMS Racing	Chevrolet	105	50
5	23	22	Austin Wayne Self	AM Racing	Chevrolet	105	37
6	11	44	Bayley Currey	Niece Motorsports	Chevrolet	105	32
7	9	98	Grant Enfinger	ThorSport Racing	Ford	105	43
8	20	52	Stewart Friesen	Halmar Friesen Racing	Chevrolet	105	29
9	30	49	Ray Ciccarelli	CMI Motorsports	Chevrolet	105	28
10	12	88	Matt Crafton	ThorSport Racing	Ford	105	28
11	5	18	Harrison Burton (R)	Kyle Busch Motorsports	Toyota	105	29
12	14	13	Johnny Sauter	ThorSport Racing	Ford	105	27
13	22	12	Gus Dean (R)	Young's Motorsports	Chevrolet	105	28
14	13	3	Jordan Anderson	Jordan Anderson Racing	Chevrolet	105	30
15	2	51	Christian Eckes	Kyle Busch Motorsports	Toyota	105	30
16	24	14	Trey Hutchens	Trey Hutchens Racing	Chevrolet	105	21
17	21	9	Codie Rohrbaugh	CR7 Motorsports	Chevrolet	105	20
18	29	33	Josh Reaume	Reaume Brothers Racing	Toyota	105	19
19	31	10	Jennifer Jo Cobb	Jennifer Jo Cobb Racing	Chevrolet	105	18
20	10	8	Joe Nemechek	NEMCO Motorsports	Chevrolet	105	17
21	28	34	Jesse Iwuji	Reaume Brothers Racing	Chevrolet	105	16
22	27	20	Spencer Boyd (R)	Young's Motorsports	Chevrolet	105	15
23	7	99	Ben Rhodes	ThorSport Racing	Ford	103	29
24	4	4	Todd Gilliland	Kyle Busch Motorsports	Toyota	98	22
25	3	17	Tyler Ankrum (R)	DGR-Crosley	Toyota	96	12
26	19	15	Anthony Alfredo (R)	DGR-Crosley	Toyota	96	11
27	16	54	Natalie Decker (R)	DGR-Crosley	Toyota	96	10
28	15	04	Cory Roper	Roper Racing	Ford	58	9
29	26	38	T. J. Bell	Niece Motorsports	Chevrolet	41	8
30	1	45	Ross Chastain	Niece Motorsports	Chevrolet	26	17
31	25	87	Camden Murphy	NEMCO Motorsports	Chevrolet	11	6
32	32	6	Norm Benning	Norm Benning Racing	Chevrolet	0	5

. – Driver made the playoffs cut.

Previous race: 2019 Eldora Dirt Derby	NASCAR Gander Outdoors Truck Series; 2019 season	Next race: 2019 UNOH 200
