= 2016 UNOH 200 =

13th race of the 2016 NASCAR Camping World Truck Series

Race details
- Race 13 of 23 of the 2016 NASCAR Camping World Truck Series
- Date: August 17, 2016
- Official name: 19th Annual UNOH 200
- Location: Bristol Motor Speedway, Bristol, Tennessee
- Course: Permanent racing facility
- Course length: 0.533 miles (0.858 km)
- Distance: 200 laps, 106 mi (171 km)
- Scheduled distance: 200 laps, 106 mi (171 km)
- Average speed: 74.387 mph (119.714 km/h)

Pole position
Driver	Tyler Reddick	Brad Keselowski Racing
- Time: 14.884

Most laps led
Driver	Christopher Bell	Kyle Busch Motorsports
- Laps: 101

Winner
No. 33	Ben Kennedy	GMS Racing

Television in the United States
- Network: FS1
- Announcers: Vince Welch, Phil Parsons, and Michael Waltrip

Radio in the United States
- Radio: MRN

The 2016 UNOH 200 was the 13th stock car race of the 2016 NASCAR Camping World Truck Series, and the 19th iteration of the event. The race was held on Wednesday, August 17, 2016, in Bristol, Tennessee, at Bristol Motor Speedway, a 0.533-mile (0.858 km) permanent oval shaped racetrack. The race took the scheduled 200 laps to complete. In an exciting battle for the win, Ben Kennedy, driving for GMS Racing, held off Brett Moffitt in the final 6 laps, and earned his first career NASCAR Camping World Truck Series win. Christopher Bell dominated the majority of the race, leading 102 laps. To fill out the podium, Daniel Hemric, driving for Brad Keselowski Racing, would finish 3rd, respectively.

== Background ==
The layout of Bristol Motor Speedway, the venue where the race was held.

Bristol Motor Speedway, formerly known as Bristol International Raceway and Bristol Raceway, is a NASCAR short track venue located in Bristol, Tennessee. Constructed in 1960, it held its first NASCAR race on July 30, 1961. Bristol is among the most popular tracks on the NASCAR schedule because of its distinct features, which include extraordinarily steep banking, an all-concrete surface, two pit roads, and stadium-like seating. It has also been named one of the loudest NASCAR tracks. The track is billed as the "World's Fastest Half-Mile"

=== Entry list ===
- (R) denotes rookie driver.
- (i) denotes driver who is ineligible for series driver points.

#	Driver	Team	Make	Sponsor
00	Cole Custer (R)	JR Motorsports	Chevrolet	Haas Automation
1	Clay Greenfield	Jennifer Jo Cobb Racing	RAM	PitStopsforHope.org
02	Austin Hill	Austin Hill Racing	Ford	Austin Hill Racing
2	Austin Cindric	Brad Keselowski Racing	Ford	Pirtek
4	Christopher Bell (R)	Kyle Busch Motorsports	Toyota	JBL, SiriusXM
05	John Wes Townley	Athenian Motorsports	Chevrolet	Jive Communications, Zaxby's
07	Matt Mills	SS-Green Light Racing	Chevrolet	Thompson Electric
8	John Hunter Nemechek	NEMCO Motorsports	Chevrolet	NEMCO Motorsports
9	William Byron (R)	Kyle Busch Motorsports	Toyota	Liberty University
10	Cody McMahan	Jennifer Jo Cobb Racing	Chevrolet	High Country Grizzlies
11	Brett Moffitt	Red Horse Racing	Toyota	BrainGear, Surface Sunscreen
13	Cameron Hayley	ThorSport Racing	Toyota	Ride TV, CBH
16	Stewart Friesen	Halmar Racing	Chevrolet	Halmar International
17	Timothy Peters	Red Horse Racing	Toyota	Red Horse Racing
19	Daniel Hemric	Brad Keselowski Racing	Ford	Blue Gate Bank
21	Johnny Sauter	GMS Racing	Chevrolet	FireAde, Allegiant Travel Company
22	Austin Wayne Self (R)	AM Racing	Toyota	AM Technical Solutions
23	Spencer Gallagher	GMS Racing	Chevrolet	Alamo Rent a Car
24	Kaz Grala	GMS Racing	Chevrolet	Sweet Baby Ray's
29	Tyler Reddick	Brad Keselowski Racing	Ford	Cooper-Standard Automotive
33	Ben Kennedy	GMS Racing	Chevrolet	Jacob Companies
41	Ben Rhodes (R)	ThorSport Racing	Toyota	Regal Cinemas
44	Tommy Joe Martins	Martins Motorsports	Chevrolet	Cross Concrete Construction
49	Bryce Napier	Premium Motorsports	Chevrolet	SupportMilitary.org, Lilly Trucking
50	Travis Kvapil	MAKE Motorsports	Chevrolet	High Country Grizzlies, CorvetteParts.net
51	Daniel Suárez (i)	Kyle Busch Motorsports	Toyota	Arris
63	Jake Griffin	MB Motorsports	Chevrolet	Dirty Hand Tools
66	Jordan Anderson	Bolen Motorsports	Chevrolet	DoodyCalls.com
71	Brandon Jones (i)	Ranier Racing with MDM	Chevrolet	M&D Building Supply, Menards
75	Caleb Holman	Henderson Motorsports	Toyota	Food Country USA
81	Jesse Little	Hattori Racing Enterprises	Toyota	Carolina Nut Co., Sumitomo
86	Brandon Brown	Brandonbilt Motorsports	Chevrolet	Coastal Carolina University
88	Matt Crafton	ThorSport Racing	Toyota	Ideal Door, Menards
92	Parker Kligerman	RBR Enterprises	Ford	Black's Tire Service, Goodyear
98	Rico Abreu (R)	ThorSport Racing	Toyota	Safelite, Curb Records
Official entry list

== Practice ==
=== First practice ===
The first practice session was held on Wednesday, August 17, at 9:30 am EST, and would last for 55 minutes. Christopher Bell, driving for Kyle Busch Motorsports, would set the fastest time in the session, with a lap of 15.535, and an average speed of 123.515 mph (198.778 km/h).

Pos.	#	Driver	Team	Make	Time	Speed
1	4	Christopher Bell (R)	Kyle Busch Motorsports	Toyota	15.535	123.515
2	17	Timothy Peters	Red Horse Racing	Toyota	15.600	123.000
3	98	Rico Abreu (R)	ThorSport Racing	Toyota	15.600	123.000
Full first practice results

=== Final practice ===
The final practice session was held on Wednesday, August 17, at 11:30 am EST, and would last for 55 minutes. Daniel Suárez, driving for Kyle Busch Motorsports, would set the fastest time in the session, with a lap of 14.820, and an average speed of 129.474 mph (208.368 km/h).

Pos.	#	Driver	Team	Make	Time	Speed
1	51	Daniel Suárez (i)	Kyle Busch Motorsports	Toyota	14.820	129.474
2	11	Brett Moffitt	Red Horse Racing	Toyota	14.860	129.125
3	9	William Byron (R)	Kyle Busch Motorsports	Toyota	14.865	129.116
Full final practice results

== Qualifying ==
Qualifying was held on Wednesday, August 17, at 4:45 pm EST. Since Bristol Motor Speedway is under 1.5 miles (2.4 km) in length, the qualifying system is a multi-car system that included three rounds. The first round was 15 minutes, where every driver would be able to set a lap within the 15 minutes. Then, the second round would consist of the fastest 24 cars in Round 1, and drivers would have 10 minutes to set a lap. Round 3 consisted of the fastest 12 drivers from Round 2, and the drivers would have 5 minutes to set a time. Whoever was fastest in Round 3 would win the pole.

Tyler Reddick, driving for Brad Keselowski Racing, would score the pole for the race, with a lap of 14.884, and an average speed of 128.917 mph (207.472 km/h) in the third round.

Jake Griffin, Clay Greenfield, and Cody McMahan would fail to qualify.

=== Full qualifying results ===
Pos.	#	Driver	Team	Make	Time (R1)	Speed (R1)	Time (R2)	Speed (R2)	Time (R3)	Speed (R3)
1	29	Tyler Reddick	Brad Keselowski Racing	Ford	14.997	127.946	14.900	128.779	14.884	128.917
2	51	Daniel Suárez (i)	Kyle Busch Motorsports	Toyota	14.885	128.908	14.931	128.511	14.963	128.236
3	13	Cameron Hayley	ThorSport Racing	Toyota	14.943	128.408	15.009	127.843	15.018	127.767
4	41	Ben Rhodes (R)	ThorSport Racing	Toyota	15.013	127.809	15.083	127.216	15.034	127.631
5	4	Christopher Bell (R)	Kyle Busch Motorsports	Toyota	14.937	128.460	14.959	128.271	15.059	127.419
6	9	William Byron (R)	Kyle Busch Motorsports	Toyota	14.912	128.675	14.923	128.580	15.071	127.317
7	21	Johnny Sauter	GMS Racing	Chevrolet	15.124	126.871	14.988	128.022	15.101	127.064
8	11	Brett Moffitt	Red Horse Racing	Toyota	14.955	128.305	15.005	127.877	15.105	127.031
9	00	Cole Custer (R)	JR Motorsports	Chevrolet	15.073	127.300	15.097	127.098	15.106	127.022
10	24	Kaz Grala	GMS Racing	Chevrolet	15.131	126.813	15.109	126.997	15.176	126.436
11	81	Jesse Little	Hattori Racing Enterprises	Toyota	15.098	127.090	15.037	127.605	15.229	125.996
12	19	Daniel Hemric	Brad Keselowski Racing	Ford	15.137	126.762	15.098	127.090	15.263	125.716
Eliminated in Round 2
13	33	Ben Kennedy	GMS Racing	Chevrolet	15.212	126.137	15.138	126.754	-	-
14	23	Spencer Gallagher	GMS Racing	Chevrolet	15.204	126.204	15.166	126.520	-	-
15	71	Brandon Jones (i)	Ranier Racing with MDM	Chevrolet	15.111	126.980	15.199	126.245	-	-
16	8	John Hunter Nemechek	NEMCO Motorsports	Chevrolet	15.241	125.897	15.209	126.162	-	-
17	88	Matt Crafton	ThorSport Racing	Toyota	15.096	127.107	15.212	126.137	-	-
18	02	Austin Hill	Austin Hill Racing	Ford	15.150	126.653	15.214	126.121	-	-
19	05	John Wes Townley	Athenian Motorsports	Chevrolet	15.115	126.947	15.220	126.071	-	-
20	98	Rico Abreu (R)	ThorSport Racing	Toyota	15.141	126.729	15.223	126.046	-	-
21	75	Caleb Holman	Henderson Motorsports	Toyota	15.189	126.328	15.237	125.930	-	-
22	66	Jordan Anderson	Bolen Motorsports	Chevrolet	15.306	125.363	15.471	124.026	-	-
23	16	Stewart Friesen	Halmar Racing	Chevrolet	15.323	125.224	15.756	121.782	-	-
24	92	Parker Kligerman	RBR Enterprises	Ford	15.256	125.773	15.970	120.150	-	-
Eliminated in Round 1
25	17	Timothy Peters	Red Horse Racing	Toyota	15.330	125.166	-	-	-	-
26	22	Austin Wayne Self (R)	AM Racing	Toyota	15.348	125.020	-	-	-	-
27	2	Austin Cindric	Brad Keselowski Racing	Ford	15.357	124.946	-	-	-	-
Qualified by owner's points
28	86	Brandon Brown	Brandonbilt Motorsports	Chevrolet	15.396	124.630	-	-	-	-
29	44	Tommy Joe Martins	Martins Motorsports	Chevrolet	15.444	124.242	-	-	-	-
30	50	Travis Kvapil	MAKE Motorsports	Chevrolet	15.846	121.090	-	-	-	-
31	07	Matt Mills	SS-Green Light Racing	Chevrolet	15.849	121.068	-	-	-	-
32	49	Bryce Napier	Premium Motorsports	Chevrolet	16.407	116.950	-	-	-	-
Failed to qualify
33	63	Jake Griffin	MB Motorsports	Chevrolet	15.360	124.922	-	-	-	-
34	1	Clay Greenfield	Jennifer Jo Cobb Racing	RAM	15.799	121.451	-	-	-	-
35	10	Cody McMahan	Jennifer Jo Cobb Racing	Chevrolet	16.092	119.236	-	-	-	-
Official qualifying results
Official starting lineup

== Race results ==
Fin	St	#	Driver	Team	Make	Laps	Led	Status	Pts
1	13	33	Ben Kennedy	GMS Racing	Chevrolet	200	20	Running	36
2	8	11	Brett Moffitt	Red Horse Racing	Toyota	200	0	Running	31
3	12	19	Daniel Hemric	Brad Keselowski Racing	Ford	200	0	Running	30
4	6	9	William Byron (R)	Kyle Busch Motorsports	Toyota	200	1	Running	30
5	7	21	Johnny Sauter	GMS Racing	Chevrolet	200	0	Running	28
6	9	00	Cole Custer (R)	JR Motorsports	Chevrolet	200	0	Running	27
7	5	4	Christopher Bell (R)	Kyle Busch Motorsports	Toyota	200	101	Running	28
8	16	8	John Hunter Nemechek	NEMCO Motorsports	Chevrolet	200	0	Running	25
9	15	71	Brandon Jones (i)	Ranier Racing with MDM	Chevrolet	200	0	Running	0
10	19	05	John Wes Townley	Athenian Motorsports	Chevrolet	200	0	Running	23
11	10	24	Kaz Grala	GMS Racing	Chevrolet	200	0	Running	22
12	14	23	Spencer Gallagher	GMS Racing	Chevrolet	200	0	Running	21
13	25	17	Timothy Peters	Red Horse Racing	Toyota	200	0	Running	20
14	1	29	Tyler Reddick	Brad Keselowski Racing	Ford	200	1	Running	20
15	21	75	Caleb Holman	Henderson Motorsports	Toyota	200	0	Running	18
16	22	66	Jordan Anderson	Bolen Motorsports	Chevrolet	200	0	Running	17
17	11	81	Jesse Little	Hattori Racing Enterprises	Toyota	200	0	Running	16
18	27	2	Austin Cindric	Brad Keselowski Racing	Ford	199	0	Running	15
19	18	02	Austin Hill	Austin Hill Racing	Ford	199	0	Running	14
20	24	92	Parker Kligerman	RBR Enterprises	Ford	199	0	Running	13
21	26	22	Austin Wayne Self (R)	AM Racing	Toyota	198	0	Running	12
22	23	16	Stewart Friesen	Halmar Racing	Chevrolet	198	0	Running	11
23	28	86	Brandon Brown	Brandonbilt Motorsports	Chevrolet	197	0	Running	10
24	3	13	Cameron Hayley	ThorSport Racing	Toyota	197	0	Running	9
25	30	50	Travis Kvapil	MAKE Motorsports	Chevrolet	197	0	Running	8
26	20	98	Rico Abreu (R)	ThorSport Racing	Toyota	194	0	Running	7
27	31	07	Matt Mills	SS-Green Light Racing	Chevrolet	191	0	Running	6
28	32	49	Bryce Napier	Premium Motorsports	Chevrolet	191	0	Running	5
29	2	51	Daniel Suárez (i)	Kyle Busch Motorsports	Toyota	186	77	Accident	0
30	4	41	Ben Rhodes (R)	ThorSport Racing	Toyota	128	0	Engine	3
31	29	44	Tommy Joe Martins	Martins Motorsports	Chevrolet	71	0	Power	2
32	17	88	Matt Crafton	ThorSport Racing	Toyota	70	0	Engine	1
Official race results

== Standings after the race ==
Drivers' Championship standings

	Pos	Driver	Points
	1	William Byron	349
1	2	Daniel Hemric	312 (−37)
2	3	Johnny Sauter	306 (−43)
	4	Timothy Peters	302 (−47)
1	5	Christopher Bell	296 (−53)
4	6	Matt Crafton	295 (−54)
2	7	Ben Kennedy	287 (−62)
1	8	John Hunter Nemechek	281 (−68)
Official driver's standings

- Note: Only the first 8 positions are included for the driver standings.

Previous race: 2016 Pocono Mountains 150	NASCAR Camping World Truck Series; 2016 season	Next race: 2016 Careers for Veterans 200
