= 2019 NASCAR Gander Outdoors Truck Series =

American motorsport season

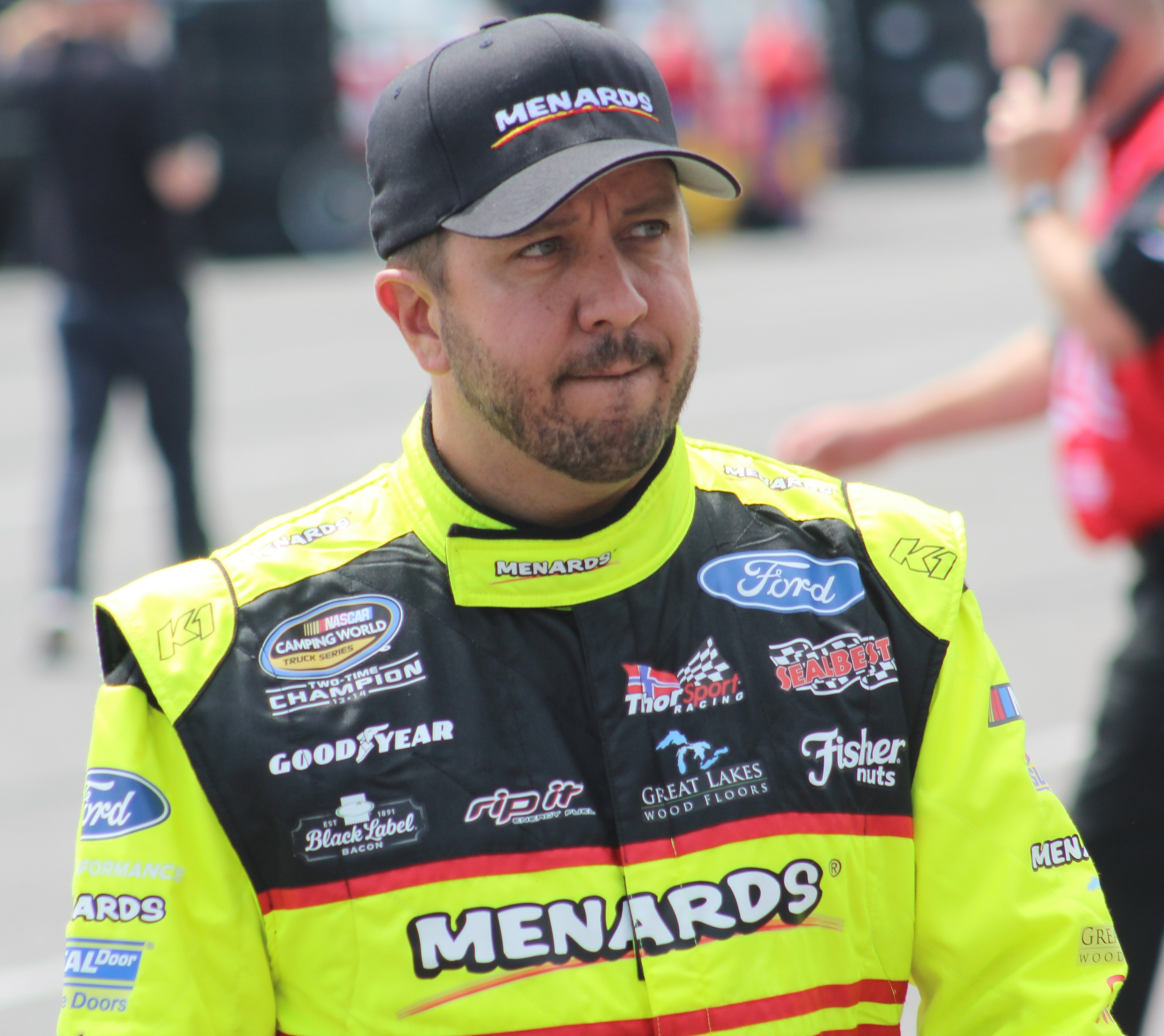
Matt Crafton, the 2019 Gander Outdoors Truck Series champion.

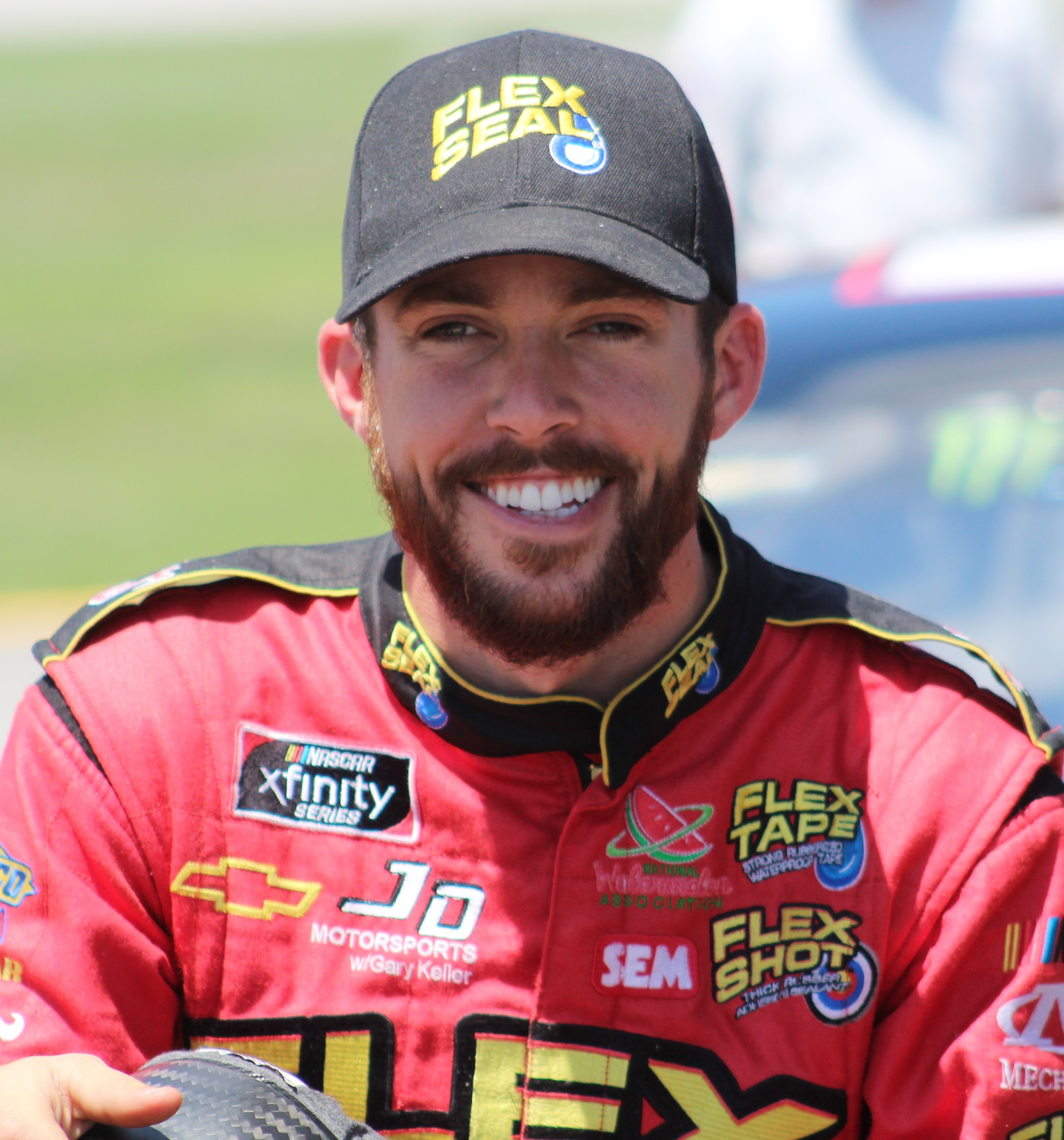
Ross Chastain finished second behind Crafton in the championship.

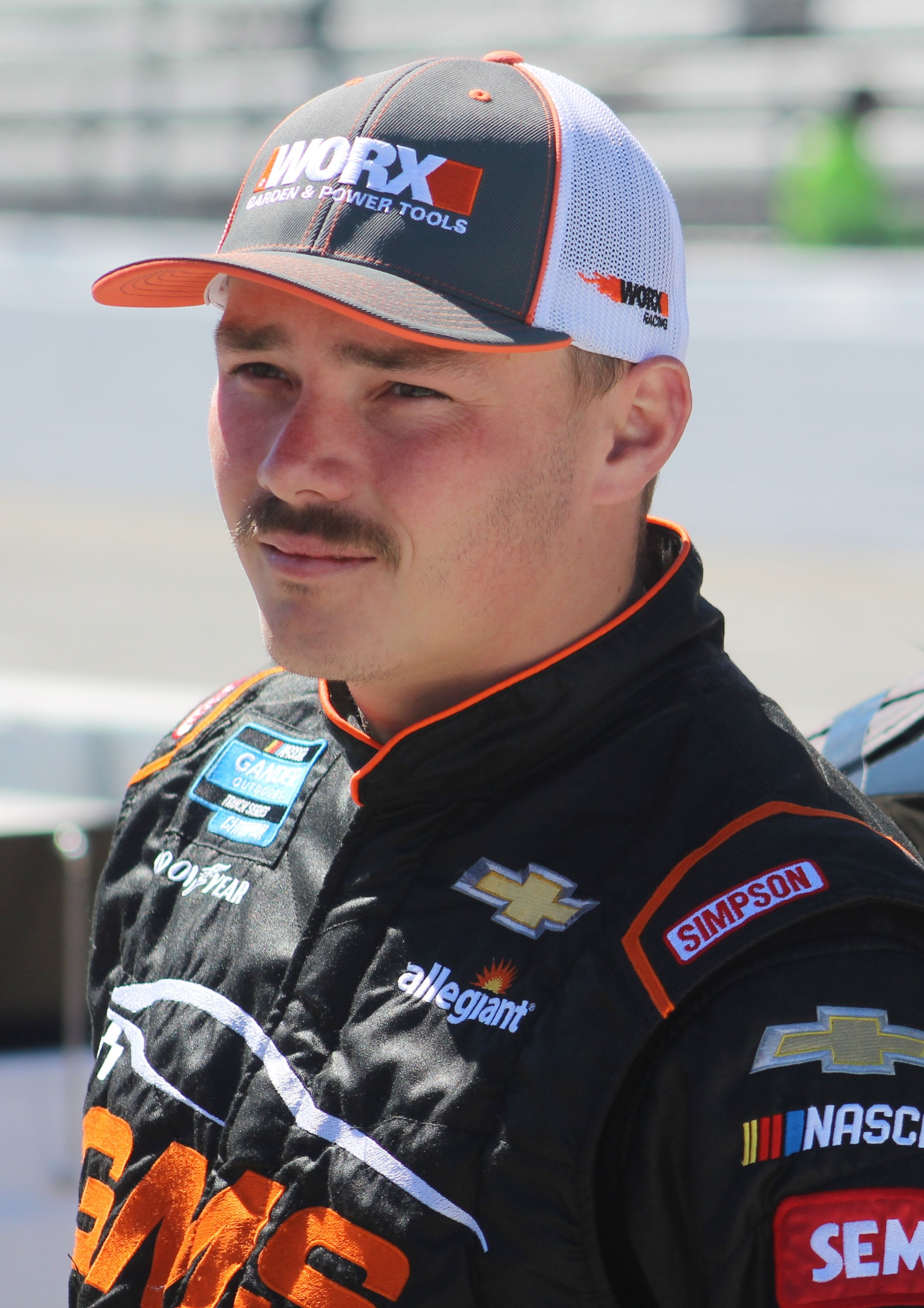
Brett Moffitt, the 2018 champion, finished third in the championship.

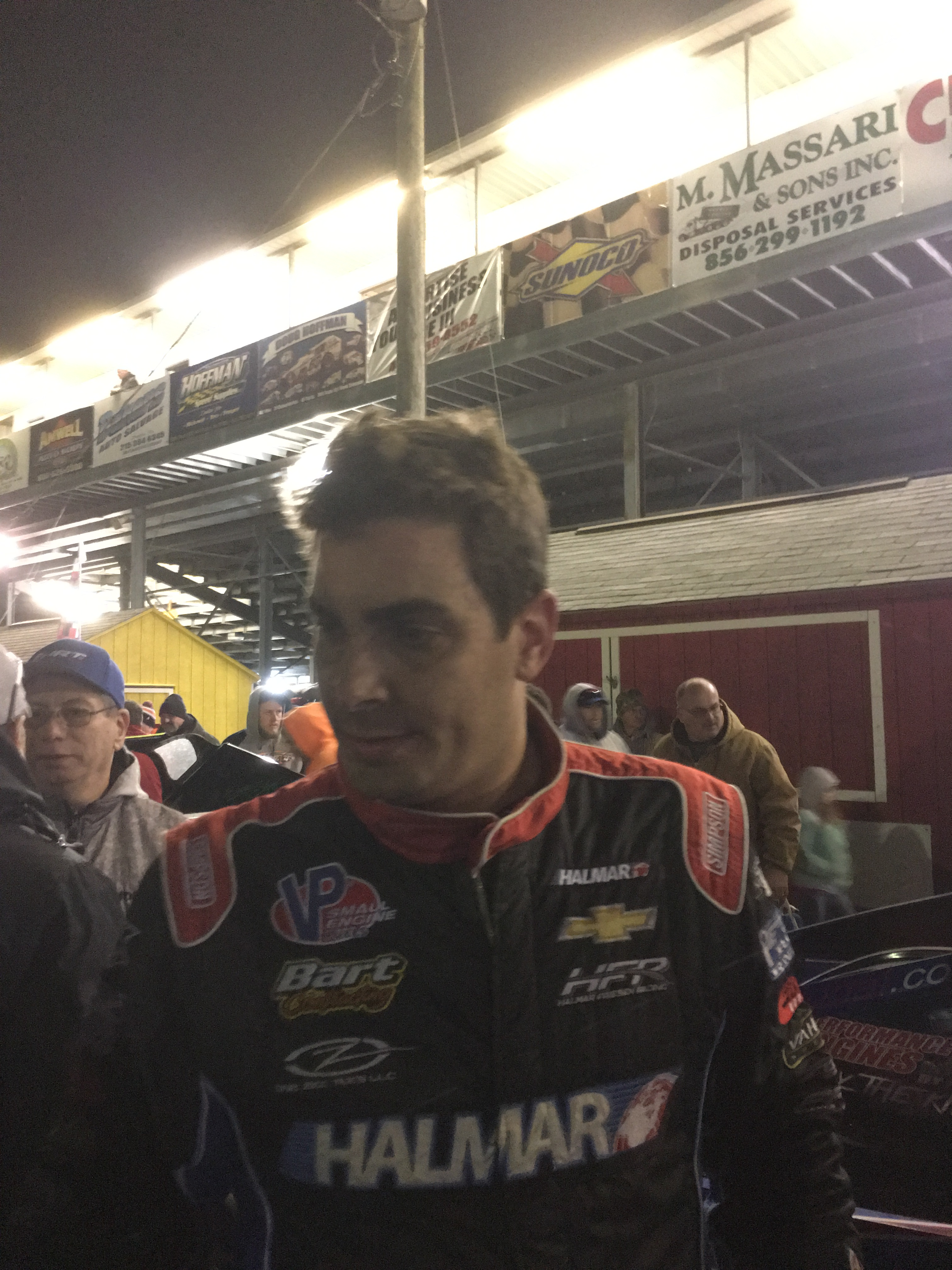
Stewart Friesen finished fourth in the championship.

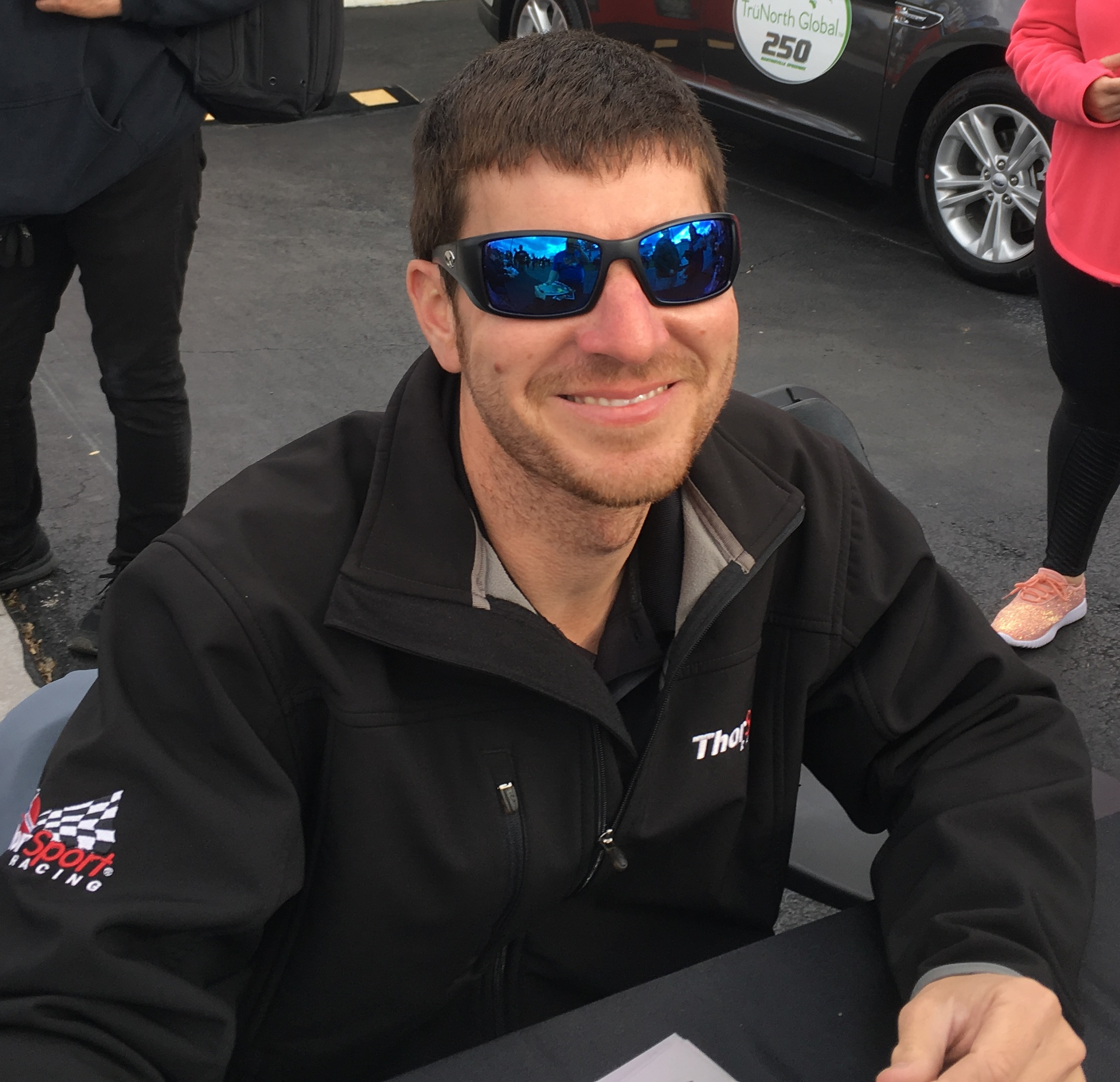
Grant Enfinger won the regular season championship, but finished sixth in the overall championship.

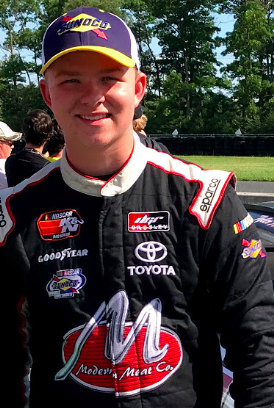
Tyler Ankrum won the rookie of the year title and was eighth in the overall championship.

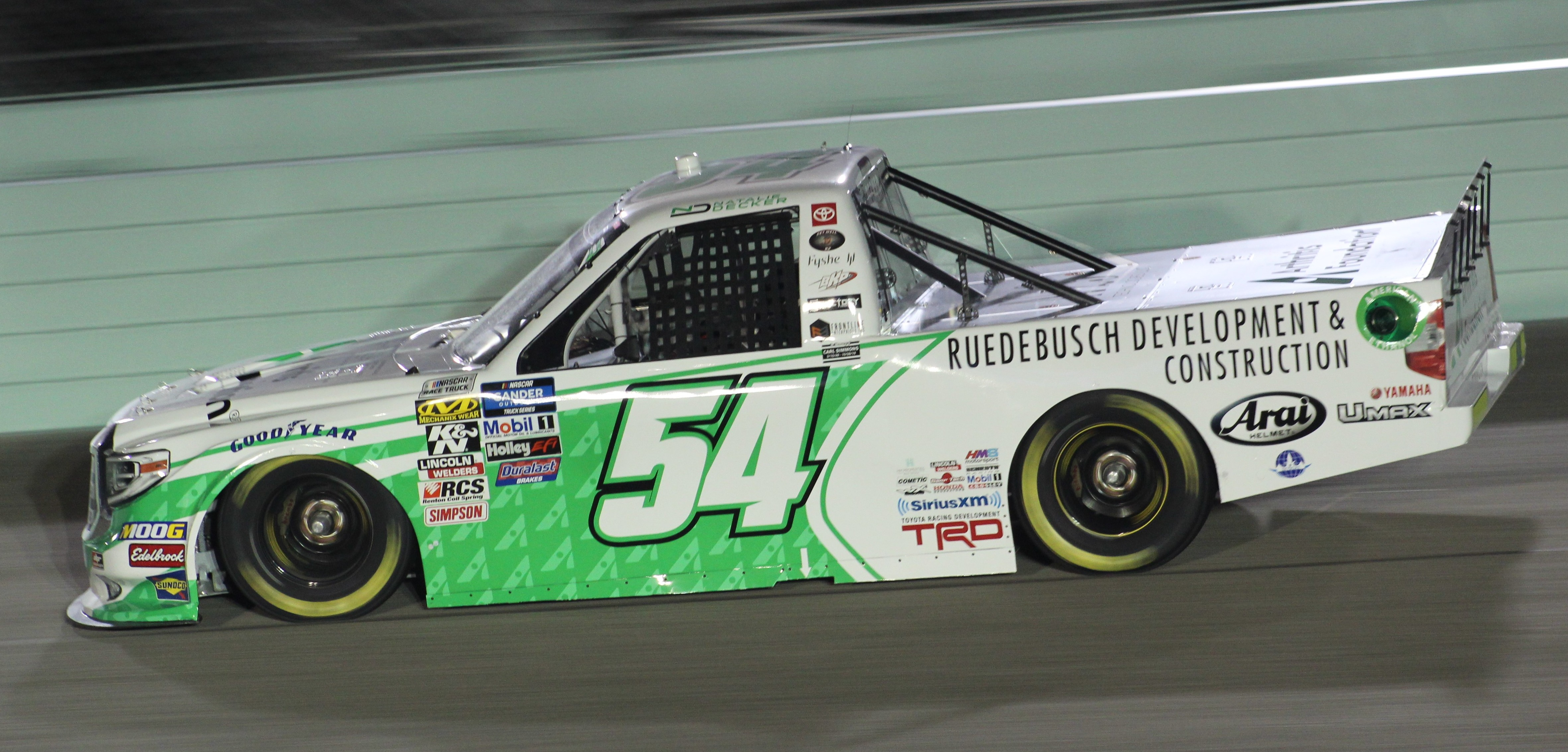
Toyota won the Manufacturer's championship with 12 wins and 860 points.

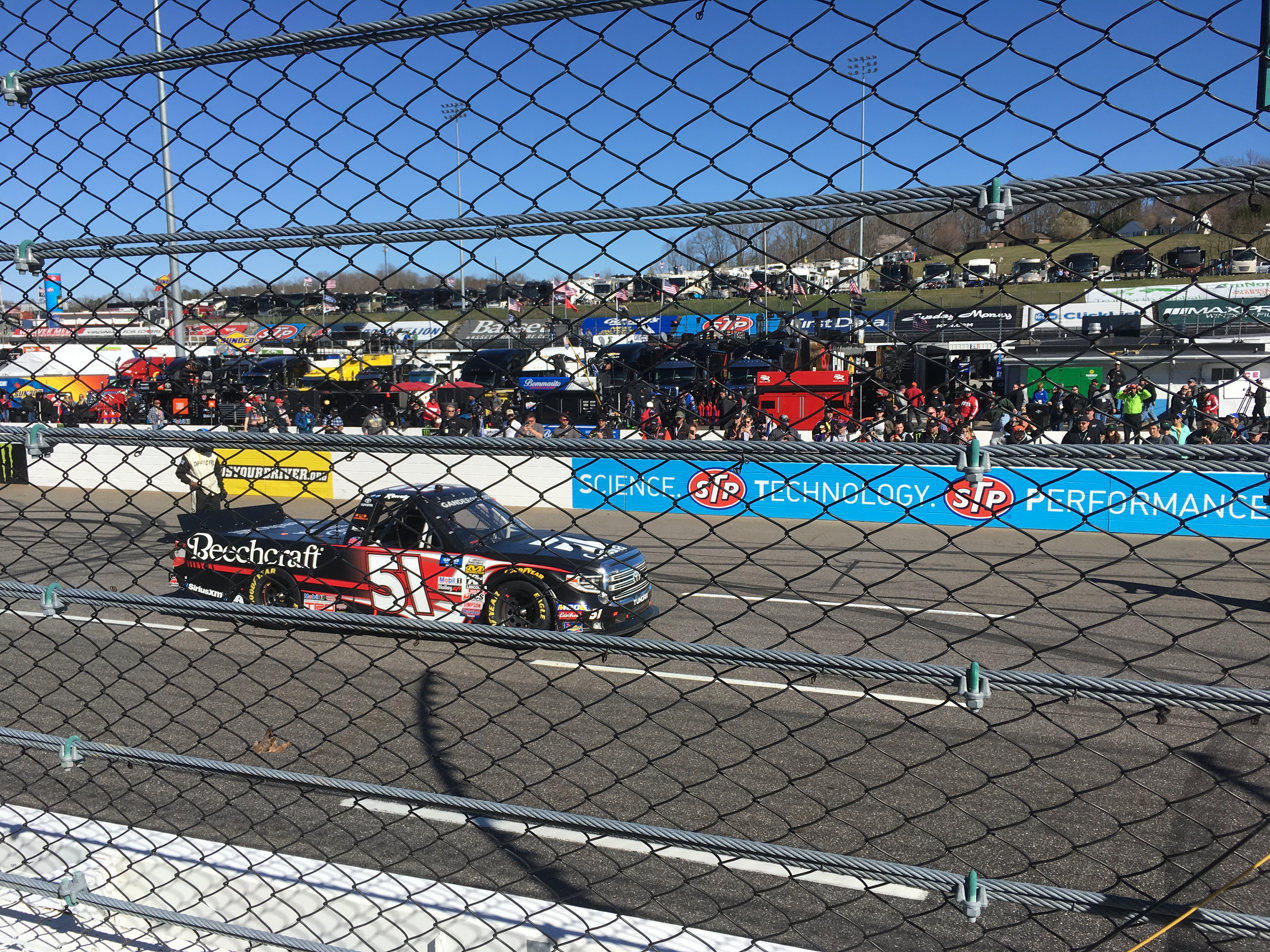
The No. 51 for Kyle Busch Motorsports won the NASCAR owner's championship.

The 2019 NASCAR Gander Outdoors Truck Series was the 25th season of the third highest stock car racing series sanctioned by NASCAR in North America. It marks the transition of the series' corporate sponsor from Camping World to its subsidiary Gander Outdoors.

Matt Crafton won his third series championship, his first since his consecutive titles in 2013 and 2014. It was the first time in Truck Series history that the champion went winless during the season. Crafton's ThorSport Racing teammate Grant Enfinger won the regular-season championship.

== Teams and drivers ==
=== Complete schedule ===
Manufacturer	Team	No.	Race driver	Crew chief
Chevrolet	AM Racing	22	Austin Wayne Self 21	Eddie Troconis
Chevrolet	AM Racing	22	Bubba Wallace 2	Eddie Troconis
Chevrolet	GMS Racing	2	Sheldon Creed (R)	Doug Randolph 13; Jeff Stankiewicz 6 Darren Fraley 4
Chevrolet	GMS Racing	24	Brett Moffitt	Jerry Baxter
Chevrolet	Halmar Friesen Racing	52	Stewart Friesen	Tripp Bruce
Chevrolet	Jennifer Jo Cobb Racing	10	Jennifer Jo Cobb 20	Steve Kuykendall 14; Melvin Burns Jr. 1 Tim Silva 8
Chevrolet	Jennifer Jo Cobb Racing	10	Juan Manuel González 2	Steve Kuykendall 14; Melvin Burns Jr. 1 Tim Silva 8
Chevrolet	Jennifer Jo Cobb Racing	10	Joey Gase 1	Steve Kuykendall 14; Melvin Burns Jr. 1 Tim Silva 8
Chevrolet	Jordan Anderson Racing	3	Jordan Anderson 22	Kevin Eagle 11; Darren Fraley 1 Wally Rogers 11
Chevrolet	Jordan Anderson Racing	3	Carson Hocevar 1	Kevin Eagle 11; Darren Fraley 1 Wally Rogers 11
Chevrolet	Niece Motorsports	44	Timothy Peters 3	Tim Mooney 1 Doug George 2 Cody Efaw 10; Kevin Eagle 10
Chevrolet	Niece Motorsports	44	Reid Wilson 2	Tim Mooney 1 Doug George 2 Cody Efaw 10; Kevin Eagle 10
Chevrolet	Niece Motorsports	44	Angela Ruch 8	Tim Mooney 1 Doug George 2 Cody Efaw 10; Kevin Eagle 10
Chevrolet	Niece Motorsports	44	Ross Chastain 1	Tim Mooney 1 Doug George 2 Cody Efaw 10; Kevin Eagle 10
Chevrolet	Niece Motorsports	44	Kyle Benjamin 1	Tim Mooney 1 Doug George 2 Cody Efaw 10; Kevin Eagle 10
Chevrolet	Niece Motorsports	44	Spencer Davis 1	Tim Mooney 1 Doug George 2 Cody Efaw 10; Kevin Eagle 10
Chevrolet	Niece Motorsports	44	Jeb Burton 2	Tim Mooney 1 Doug George 2 Cody Efaw 10; Kevin Eagle 10
Chevrolet	Niece Motorsports	44	Bayley Currey 2	Tim Mooney 1 Doug George 2 Cody Efaw 10; Kevin Eagle 10
Chevrolet	Niece Motorsports	44	Jeffrey Abbey 1	Tim Mooney 1 Doug George 2 Cody Efaw 10; Kevin Eagle 10
Chevrolet	Niece Motorsports	44	Gary Klutt 1	Tim Mooney 1 Doug George 2 Cody Efaw 10; Kevin Eagle 10
Chevrolet	Niece Motorsports	44	Ty Majeski 1	Tim Mooney 1 Doug George 2 Cody Efaw 10; Kevin Eagle 10
Chevrolet	Niece Motorsports	45	Ross Chastain 21	Phil Gould
Chevrolet	Niece Motorsports	45	Kyle Benjamin 2	Phil Gould
Chevrolet	Young's Motorsports	02	Tyler Dippel (R) 22	Chad Kendrick
Chevrolet	Young's Motorsports	02	D. J. Kennington 1	Chad Kendrick
Chevrolet	Young's Motorsports	12	Gus Dean (R)	Jeff Stankiewicz 13; Ryan London 10
Chevrolet	Young's Motorsports	20	Spencer Boyd 18	Andrew Abbott 14; Bruce Cook 1 Buddy Sisco 8
Chevrolet	Young's Motorsports	20	Landon Huffman 2	Andrew Abbott 14; Bruce Cook 1 Buddy Sisco 8
Chevrolet	Young's Motorsports	20	Dylan Lupton 1	Andrew Abbott 14; Bruce Cook 1 Buddy Sisco 8
Chevrolet	Young's Motorsports	20	Colby Howard 2	Andrew Abbott 14; Bruce Cook 1 Buddy Sisco 8
Ford	ThorSport Racing	13	Johnny Sauter 22	Joe Shear Jr.
Ford	ThorSport Racing	13	Myatt Snider 1	Joe Shear Jr.
Ford	ThorSport Racing	88	Matt Crafton	Carl Joiner Jr.
Ford	ThorSport Racing	98	Grant Enfinger	Jeff Hensley
Ford	ThorSport Racing	99	Ben Rhodes	Matt Noyce
Toyota	DGR-Crosley	17	David Gilliland 1	Kevin Manion 22; Chris Lawson 1
Toyota	DGR-Crosley	17	Anthony Alfredo (R) 2	Kevin Manion 22; Chris Lawson 1
Toyota	DGR-Crosley	17	Ryan Reed 1	Kevin Manion 22; Chris Lawson 1
Toyota	DGR-Crosley	17	Tyler Ankrum (R) 18	Kevin Manion 22; Chris Lawson 1
Toyota	DGR-Crosley	17	Raphaël Lessard 1	Kevin Manion 22; Chris Lawson 1
Toyota	DGR-Crosley	54	Natalie Decker (R) 19	Frank Kerr 22; Chris Lawson 1
Toyota	DGR-Crosley	54	David Gilliland 1	Frank Kerr 22; Chris Lawson 1
Toyota	DGR-Crosley	54	Anthony Alfredo (R) 1	Frank Kerr 22; Chris Lawson 1
Toyota	DGR-Crosley	54	Kyle Strickler 1	Frank Kerr 22; Chris Lawson 1
Toyota	DGR-Crosley	54	Raphaël Lessard 1	Frank Kerr 22; Chris Lawson 1
Toyota	Hattori Racing Enterprises	16	Austin Hill	Scott Zipadelli
Toyota	Kyle Busch Motorsports	4	Todd Gilliland	Marcus Richmond 8 Wes Ward 11; Michael Shelton 4
Toyota	Kyle Busch Motorsports	18	Harrison Burton (R)	Mike Hillman Jr.
Toyota	Kyle Busch Motorsports	51	Christian Eckes 8	Rudy Fugle
Toyota	Kyle Busch Motorsports	51	Kyle Busch 5	Rudy Fugle
Toyota	Kyle Busch Motorsports	51	Brandon Jones 5	Rudy Fugle
Toyota	Kyle Busch Motorsports	51	Greg Biffle 1	Rudy Fugle
Toyota	Kyle Busch Motorsports	51	Chandler Smith 2	Rudy Fugle
Toyota	Kyle Busch Motorsports	51	Alex Tagliani 1	Rudy Fugle
Toyota	Kyle Busch Motorsports	51	Riley Herbst 1	Rudy Fugle
Chevrolet	NEMCO Motorsports	8	Angela Ruch 2	Gere Kennon Jr. 19; Darren Wolfe 2 Duke Whiseant 1
Chevrolet	NEMCO Motorsports	8	Joe Nemechek 6	Gere Kennon Jr. 19; Darren Wolfe 2 Duke Whiseant 1
Chevrolet	NEMCO Motorsports	8	Austin Dillon 1	Gere Kennon Jr. 19; Darren Wolfe 2 Duke Whiseant 1
Chevrolet	NEMCO Motorsports	8	Camden Murphy 4	Gere Kennon Jr. 19; Darren Wolfe 2 Duke Whiseant 1
Chevrolet	NEMCO Motorsports	8	Tony Mrakovich 2	Gere Kennon Jr. 19; Darren Wolfe 2 Duke Whiseant 1
Chevrolet	NEMCO Motorsports	8	Trey Hutchens 1	Gere Kennon Jr. 19; Darren Wolfe 2 Duke Whiseant 1
Chevrolet	NEMCO Motorsports	8	Colt Gilliam 1	Gere Kennon Jr. 19; Darren Wolfe 2 Duke Whiseant 1
Chevrolet	NEMCO Motorsports	8	John Hunter Nemechek 5	Gere Kennon Jr. 19; Darren Wolfe 2 Duke Whiseant 1
Toyota	Reaume Brothers Racing	8	Josh Reaume 1 (Note: It was a Reaume Brothers Racing entry using NEMCO Motorsports' owner points.)	Aaron Moore
Chevrolet 18 Toyota 5	Reaume Brothers Racing	33	Josh Reaume 10	John Reaume 7 Gregory Rayl 2 Sean Kenyon 3 Maurice Bachand 5 Josh Reaume 4 Steve Bachand 1 Matthew Wolper 1
Chevrolet 18 Toyota 5	Reaume Brothers Racing	33	Daniel Sasnett 1	John Reaume 7 Gregory Rayl 2 Sean Kenyon 3 Maurice Bachand 5 Josh Reaume 4 Steve Bachand 1 Matthew Wolper 1
Chevrolet 18 Toyota 5	Reaume Brothers Racing	33	Ryan Sieg 2	John Reaume 7 Gregory Rayl 2 Sean Kenyon 3 Maurice Bachand 5 Josh Reaume 4 Steve Bachand 1 Matthew Wolper 1
Chevrolet 18 Toyota 5	Reaume Brothers Racing	33	C. J. McLaughlin 1	John Reaume 7 Gregory Rayl 2 Sean Kenyon 3 Maurice Bachand 5 Josh Reaume 4 Steve Bachand 1 Matthew Wolper 1
Chevrolet 18 Toyota 5	Reaume Brothers Racing	33	Josh Bilicki 2	John Reaume 7 Gregory Rayl 2 Sean Kenyon 3 Maurice Bachand 5 Josh Reaume 4 Steve Bachand 1 Matthew Wolper 1
Chevrolet 18 Toyota 5	Reaume Brothers Racing	33	Mason Massey 3	John Reaume 7 Gregory Rayl 2 Sean Kenyon 3 Maurice Bachand 5 Josh Reaume 4 Steve Bachand 1 Matthew Wolper 1
Chevrolet 18 Toyota 5	Reaume Brothers Racing	33	Mike Marlar 1	John Reaume 7 Gregory Rayl 2 Sean Kenyon 3 Maurice Bachand 5 Josh Reaume 4 Steve Bachand 1 Matthew Wolper 1
Chevrolet 18 Toyota 5	Reaume Brothers Racing	33	Dan Corcoran 1	John Reaume 7 Gregory Rayl 2 Sean Kenyon 3 Maurice Bachand 5 Josh Reaume 4 Steve Bachand 1 Matthew Wolper 1
Chevrolet 18 Toyota 5	Reaume Brothers Racing	33	Dawson Cram 1	John Reaume 7 Gregory Rayl 2 Sean Kenyon 3 Maurice Bachand 5 Josh Reaume 4 Steve Bachand 1 Matthew Wolper 1
Chevrolet 18 Toyota 5	Reaume Brothers Racing	33	Carson Ware 1	John Reaume 7 Gregory Rayl 2 Sean Kenyon 3 Maurice Bachand 5 Josh Reaume 4 Steve Bachand 1 Matthew Wolper 1

=== Limited schedule ===
Manufacturer	Team	No.	Race driver	Crew chief	Rounds
Chevrolet	Chad Finley Racing	42	Robby Lyons	Bruce Cook	1
Chevrolet	Chad Finley Racing	42	Chad Finley	Bruce Cook	4
Chevrolet	Chad Finley Racing	42	Garrett Smithley	Bruce Cook	1
Chevrolet	CMI Motorsports	49	Ray Ciccarelli	Joe Lax	10
Chevrolet	CMI Motorsports	49	Stefan Parsons	Joe Lax	1
Chevrolet	Copp Motorsports	63	Bobby Gerhart	Mark Freeman	1
Chevrolet	Copp Motorsports	63	Timmy Hill	Mark Freeman	1
Chevrolet	Copp Motorsports	63	Scott Stenzel	Mark Freeman	1
Chevrolet	Copp Motorsports	63	Dawson Cram	Clinton Cram	1
Chevrolet	FDNY Racing	28	Bryan Dauzat	Jim Rosenblum	3
Chevrolet	GMS Racing	21	Sam Mayer	Mardy Lindley	3
Chevrolet	CR7 Motorsports	9	Codie Rohrbaugh	Michael Shelton 1 Mark Huff 1 Doug George 10	12
Chevrolet	Henderson Motorsports	75	Parker Kligerman	Chris Carrier	3
Chevrolet	Hill Motorsports	56	Timmy Hill	Greg Ely 9 Timmy Hill 1	5
Chevrolet	Hill Motorsports	56	Tyler Hill	Greg Ely 9 Timmy Hill 1	5
Chevrolet	Jordan Anderson Racing	56	Bobby Reuse (Note: It was a Jordan Anderson Racing entry using Hill Motorsports' owner points.)	Danny Ketterman Jr.	1
Chevrolet	Jordan Anderson Racing	56	Carson Hocevar	Darren Fraley	1
Chevrolet	Jennifer Jo Cobb Racing	0	Jennifer Jo Cobb	Daniel Griggs 4 Joe Majenski 4	2
Chevrolet	Jennifer Jo Cobb Racing	0	Gregory Rayl	Daniel Griggs 4 Joe Majenski 4	1
Chevrolet	Jennifer Jo Cobb Racing	0	Joey Gase	Daniel Griggs 4 Joe Majenski 4	1
Chevrolet	Jennifer Jo Cobb Racing	0	Daniel Sasnett	Daniel Griggs 4 Joe Majenski 4	2
Chevrolet	Jennifer Jo Cobb Racing	0	Ray Ciccarelli	Daniel Griggs 4 Joe Majenski 4	1
Chevrolet	Jennifer Jo Cobb Racing	0	Cody McMahan	Daniel Griggs 4 Joe Majenski 4	1
Chevrolet	Lou Goss Racing	74	Lou Goss	Tim Goulet 1 Jerry Kennedy 1	2
Chevrolet	Lou Goss Racing	74	Darwin Peters Jr.	Alan Collins Jr.	1
Chevrolet	Mike Affarano Motorsports	03	Jake Griffin	David McClure	1
Chevrolet	NEMCO Motorsports	87	Joe Nemechek	John Hunter Nemechek 1 Duke Whiseant 12; Gere Kennon Jr. 2	7
Chevrolet	NEMCO Motorsports	87	Timmy Hill	John Hunter Nemechek 1 Duke Whiseant 12; Gere Kennon Jr. 2	2
Chevrolet	NEMCO Motorsports	87	Tyler Ankrum (R)	John Hunter Nemechek 1 Duke Whiseant 12; Gere Kennon Jr. 2	2
Chevrolet	NEMCO Motorsports	87	Camden Murphy	John Hunter Nemechek 1 Duke Whiseant 12; Gere Kennon Jr. 2	2
Chevrolet	NEMCO Motorsports	87	Tony Mrakovich	John Hunter Nemechek 1 Duke Whiseant 12; Gere Kennon Jr. 2	1
Chevrolet	NEMCO Motorsports	87	Timothy Peters	John Hunter Nemechek 1 Duke Whiseant 12; Gere Kennon Jr. 2	1
Chevrolet	Niece Motorsports	38	T. J. Bell	Adam Crigger 2 Cody Efaw 4	3
Chevrolet	Niece Motorsports	38	Ross Chastain	Adam Crigger 2 Cody Efaw 4	1
Chevrolet	Niece Motorsports	38	Mark Smith (Note: Entry was fielded in a collaboration with Jordan Anderson Racing.)	Adam Crigger 2 Cody Efaw 4	1
Chevrolet	Niece Motorsports	38	Colin Garrett	Adam Crigger 2 Cody Efaw 4	1
Chevrolet	Norm Benning Racing	6	Norm Benning	Thomas Lauffer 5 Adam Hagen 6 Brian Poff 7	18
Chevrolet	Ted Minor Motorsports	25	Ted Minor	Garry Stephens	1
Chevrolet	Tony Mrakovich Racing	43	Tony Mrakovich	Tristan Mrakovich	1
Chevrolet	Trey Hutchens Racing	14	Trey Hutchens	Bobby Hutchens Jr.	3
Chevrolet	Jordan Anderson Racing	04	Roger Reuse (Note: It was a Jordan Anderson Racing entry using Roper Racing's owner points.)	Shane Whitbeck	1
Ford	Roper Racing	04	Cory Roper	Shane Whitbeck	11
Ford	Jacob Wallace Racing	80	B. J. McLeod	Tracy Wallace	1
Ford	Jacob Wallace Racing	80	Justin Shipley	Wayne Hansard	1
Ford	JJL Motorsports	97	Jesse Little	J. R. Norris 2 Bill Henderson 7 Bruce Cook 1	10
Ford	RBR Enterprises	92	Austin Theriault	Michael Hester	2
Ford	RBR Enterprises	92	Timothy Peters	Michael Hester	2
Ford	ThorSport Racing	27	Myatt Snider	Bud Haefele	2
Ford	ThorSport Racing	27	Chase Briscoe	Bud Haefele	1
Toyota	Bill McAnally Racing	19	Derek Kraus	Kevin Bellicourt	5
Toyota	All Out Motorsports	7	Korbin Forrister	Wally Rogers 7 Danny Gill 1	8
Toyota	DGR-Crosley	7	Tanner Gray	Seth Smith	2
Toyota	DGR-Crosley	5	Dylan Lupton	Blake Bainbridge	4
Toyota	DGR-Crosley	15	Dylan Lupton	Chris Lawson 11; Blake Bainbridge 1 Seth Smith 1	2
Toyota	DGR-Crosley	15	Anthony Alfredo (R)	Chris Lawson 11; Blake Bainbridge 1 Seth Smith 1	10
Toyota	DGR-Crosley	15	Tanner Gray	Chris Lawson 11; Blake Bainbridge 1 Seth Smith 1	1
Toyota	Glenden Enterprises	47	Chris Fontaine	Kevin Ingram	1
Toyota	Kyle Busch Motorsports	46	Raphaël Lessard	Michael Shelton 3 Marcus Richmond 3	3
Toyota	Kyle Busch Motorsports	46	Riley Herbst	Michael Shelton 3 Marcus Richmond 3	2
Toyota	Kyle Busch Motorsports	46	Chandler Smith	Michael Shelton 3 Marcus Richmond 3	2
Toyota	On Point Motorsports	30	Brennan Poole	Steven Lane	13
Toyota	On Point Motorsports	30	Danny Bohn	Steven Lane	3
Toyota	Kart Idaho Racing	08	Tim Ward	Sonny Wahl	1
Toyota	Kart Idaho Racing	08	Justin Johnson (Note: Justin Johnson drove at Las Vegas in September with the No. 34. Jesse Iwuji, the driver of the No. 34 Chevrolet for Reaume Brothers Racing, crashed in qualifying but still qualified for the race by owner points. His team didn't have a backup truck, so they could not start the race. Johnson, who did not qualify for the race, took over the No. 34 and was able to start with his (previously No. 08) Kart Idaho Racing Toyota.)	Sonny Wahl	1
Toyota	Kart Idaho Racing	34	Justin Johnson	Sonny Wahl	1
Chevrolet 15 Toyota 6	Reaume Brothers Racing	34	Jason White	Gregory Rayl 13; Steve Bachand 4 Matthew Wolper 2 Josh Reaume 1 Maurice Bachand 1	2
Chevrolet 15 Toyota 6	Reaume Brothers Racing	34	Jesse Iwuji	Gregory Rayl 13; Steve Bachand 4 Matthew Wolper 2 Josh Reaume 1 Maurice Bachand 1	6
Chevrolet 15 Toyota 6	Reaume Brothers Racing	34	Josh Reaume	Gregory Rayl 13; Steve Bachand 4 Matthew Wolper 2 Josh Reaume 1 Maurice Bachand 1	3
Chevrolet 15 Toyota 6	Reaume Brothers Racing	34	Josh Bilicki	Gregory Rayl 13; Steve Bachand 4 Matthew Wolper 2 Josh Reaume 1 Maurice Bachand 1	3
Chevrolet 15 Toyota 6	Reaume Brothers Racing	34	Scott Stenzel	Gregory Rayl 13; Steve Bachand 4 Matthew Wolper 2 Josh Reaume 1 Maurice Bachand 1	1
Chevrolet 15 Toyota 6	Reaume Brothers Racing	34	Mason Massey	Gregory Rayl 13; Steve Bachand 4 Matthew Wolper 2 Josh Reaume 1 Maurice Bachand 1	3
Chevrolet 15 Toyota 6	Reaume Brothers Racing	34	Bryant Barnhill	Gregory Rayl 13; Steve Bachand 4 Matthew Wolper 2 Josh Reaume 1 Maurice Bachand 1	1
Chevrolet 15 Toyota 6	Reaume Brothers Racing	34	J. J. Yeley	Gregory Rayl 13; Steve Bachand 4 Matthew Wolper 2 Josh Reaume 1 Maurice Bachand 1	1
Chevrolet 15 Toyota 6	Reaume Brothers Racing	34	Kyle Plott	Gregory Rayl 13; Steve Bachand 4 Matthew Wolper 2 Josh Reaume 1 Maurice Bachand 1	1
Chevrolet 2 Toyota 3	Reaume Brothers Racing	32	Daniel Sasnett	John Reaume 3 Maurice Bachand 1 Matthew Wolper 1	1
Chevrolet 2 Toyota 3	Reaume Brothers Racing	32	Mason Massey	John Reaume 3 Maurice Bachand 1 Matthew Wolper 1	1
Chevrolet 2 Toyota 3	Reaume Brothers Racing	32	Bryant Barnhill	John Reaume 3 Maurice Bachand 1 Matthew Wolper 1	1
Chevrolet 2 Toyota 3	Reaume Brothers Racing	32	Devin Dodson	John Reaume 3 Maurice Bachand 1 Matthew Wolper 1	1
Chevrolet 2 Toyota 3	Reaume Brothers Racing	32	Gregory Rayl	John Reaume 3 Maurice Bachand 1 Matthew Wolper 1	1
Chevrolet 3 Toyota 3	Beaver Motorsports	1	Stefan Parsons	Brian Wertman 1 Mike Harmon 1 Jason Dorman 1 Jerry Kennedy 3	1
Chevrolet 3 Toyota 3	Beaver Motorsports	1	Travis Kvapil	Brian Wertman 1 Mike Harmon 1 Jason Dorman 1 Jerry Kennedy 3	1
Chevrolet 3 Toyota 3	Beaver Motorsports	1	Bayley Currey	Brian Wertman 1 Mike Harmon 1 Jason Dorman 1 Jerry Kennedy 3	2 (Note: Entries were fielded in a collaboration with Vizion Motorsports.)
Chevrolet 3 Toyota 3	Beaver Motorsports	1	Cody McMahan	Brian Wertman 1 Mike Harmon 1 Jason Dorman 1 Jerry Kennedy 3	1
Chevrolet 3 Toyota 3	Beaver Motorsports	1	B. J. McLeod	Brian Wertman 1 Mike Harmon 1 Jason Dorman 1 Jerry Kennedy 3	1
Chevrolet 1 Toyota 3	Clay Greenfield Motorsports	68	Clay Greenfield	Danny Gill 1 Gary Mann 1 Andrew Abbott 1 Michael Shelton 1	4
Ford 2 Toyota 3	Rette Jones Racing	11	Spencer Davis	Mark Rette	5

=== Changes ===
==== Teams ====
- On December 5, 2018, it was announced that Chad Finley Racing would field a full-time effort in 2019 with the No. 42 Chevrolet Silverado. Chad Finley and Robby Lyons were announced as drivers, while Bruce Cook was announced as crew chief. CFR ran part-time in the 2018 NASCAR Camping World Truck Series. However, the team elected to not run at Las Vegas as the team's hauler was damaged when exiting Atlanta. They ended up running part-time for the rest of the year.
- On December 8, 2018, MDM Motorsports announced that they would no longer field an entry in the Truck Series, as they will focus their efforts on the ARCA Racing Series and NASCAR K&N Pro Series.
- On January 28, 2019, On Point Motorsports announced they would run their No. 30 Toyota Tundra full-time in 2019 with Brennan Poole, who was without a ride for most of 2018 after his Xfinity team from 2016 and 2017 shut down. Ultimately, the team ended up going down to part-time due to lack of sponsorship and to focus on finishing better at the races they did run (Poole finished an impressive 2nd after the team skipped a race).
- On January 31, 2019, Niece Motorsports announced that they would field Timothy Peters in a second truck, the No. 44, for the first three races of the season. The No. 44 replaced the No. 22 as Niece's second truck, after AM Racing went back to being its own team independent from Niece. After originally anticipating for it to run just part-time, the No. 44 then became full-time in March after Angela Ruch joined the team for a 12 race schedule. Reid Wilson, Ross Chastain, Kyle Benjamin, Spencer Davis, Bayley Currey, and Jeffrey Abbey also ran races in the No. 44 throughout the season.
- On February 5, 2019, AM Racing announced that they would be returning in 2019, splitting away from Niece Motorsports after the two teams had merged in 2018.
- On March 14, 2019, Hill Motorsports announced an entry into the sport with plans to run about ten races over the course of the season. They purchased trucks and equipment from the closed MDM No. 99 team. Owner Timmy Hill and his brother Tyler were announced as drivers.
- On July 30, 2019, Jordan Anderson Racing and Niece Motorsports announced a partnership to field Niece's No. 38 Chevrolet for Mark Smith at the Eldora Dirt Derby.
- On August 6, 2019, Copp Motorsports owner D. J. Copp announced that the future of his team is uncertain, commenting that "some people make it hard to love the sanctioning body."

==== Drivers ====
- On November 9, 2018, Sheldon Creed announced that he would compete full-time for GMS Racing in 2019 in the organization's No. 2 entry. Creed drove for MDM Motorsports in the ARCA Racing Series in 2018, winning the championship. The No. 2 truck had been primarily driven by Cody Coughlin in 2018 before his release.
- On November 14, 2018, Kyle Busch Motorsports announced that Harrison Burton would compete full-time in the No. 18 Toyota Tundra, replacing Noah Gragson, who moved up to the NASCAR Xfinity Series.
- On November 30, 2018, DGR-Crosley announced that they have added Natalie Decker to their driver development program for 2019, where she would run a select number of Truck Series races with the No. 54 Toyota and made her debut at Daytona.
- On December 6, 2018, it was announced that 2018 NASCAR Camping World Truck Series Champion Brett Moffitt was released from the Hattori Racing Enterprises No. 16 team due to financial issues. The team had planned to replace Moffitt with a driver who has sponsorship backing. On January 8, 2019, Hattori Racing Enterprises announced that Austin Hill had signed to drive the No. 16 Toyota full-time in 2019.
- On December 6, 2018, it was announced that Anthony Alfredo would compete part-time with DGR-Crosley, sharing the No. 54 with Natalie Decker. He made his debut in the Atlanta race in the team's No. 17 since that truck's normal driver, Tyler Ankrum, had not yet turned 18 and was ineligible to race at the mile-and-a-half track. Alfredo would end up running most of his schedule in the part-time No. 15 truck after Decker ended up running almost the full season in the No. 54.
- On December 14, 2018, it was announced that Tyler Ankrum would run with DGR-Crosley in 2019. Ankrum will miss the first three races of the season due to age restrictions but then run the final twenty races of the season in the organization's No. 17 entry. On February 20, 2019, it was announced that Ryan Reed will drive the No. 17 Toyota at the Strat 200 at Las Vegas. On June 12, 2019, it was reported that Ankrum will run the season part-time due to a lack of sponsorship. However, he joined NEMCO Motorsports to run the No. 87 car at Iowa.
- On January 2, 2019, Tony Mrakovich announced that he would compete part-time in 2019 with his own team, Tony Mrakovich Racing.
- On January 7, 2019, Young's Motorsports announced that Spencer Boyd would drive the No. 20 truck full-time in 2019. Andrew Abbott returns as the crew chief. On July 30, Landon Huffman was announced to substitute for Boyd at the Eldora Dirt Derby, as Boyd was suffering from back problems. Boyd returned the next race at Michigan, but then announced on August 14, 2019, after missing the playoffs, he had decided to run only part-time the rest of the season in the Truck Series in order to concentrate on running more Cup Series races. He had made his Cup debut driving the No. 53 car for Rick Ware Racing that same weekend. Huffman would return to the No. 20 truck at Bristol.
- On January 9, 2019, Young's Motorsports announced that Gus Dean would drive the No. 12 truck full-time in 2019. LG Air Conditioning Technologies will be the main sponsor for the truck in 8 races, and former MDM Motorsports crew chief Jeff Stankiewicz will lead the team's efforts this season.
- On January 9, 2019, GMS Racing announced that Johnny Sauter would not return to the No. 21 truck for the 2019 season. Speaking to Sirius XM NASCAR Radio, Sauter said that current series champion Brett Moffitt would replace him. On January 10, GMS confirmed that Moffitt will join the team but he will drive the No. 24 truck, replacing Justin Haley. The No. 21 truck will turn into a part-time truck, driven by Sam Mayer.
- On January 18, 2019, Young's Motorsports announced that Tyler Dippel will drive the No. 02 Chevrolet full-time in 2019. Dippel drove in 2018 for DGR-Crosley and GMS Racing. On August 23, NASCAR announced that Dippel had been suspended indefinitely for violation of the sport's Code of Conduct. D. J. Kennington served as his substitute replacement for the race at Canada. Dippel was reinstated the following week on August 28, 2019.
- On January 23, 2019, Bill McAnally Racing announced that Derek Kraus will drive the No. 19 Toyota for select races in 2019.
- On January 28, 2019, it was announced that Brennan Poole will run full-time with On Point Motorsports in the No. 30 Toyota while also running for Rookie of the Year honors.
- On January 28, 2019, Kyle Busch Motorsports announced that team owner Kyle Busch will run five Truck Series races in the No. 51 Toyota.
- On February 13, 2019, it was announced that Johnny Sauter would be re-joining ThorSport Racing, the team he drove for from 2009 to 2015, in the No. 13 Ford, in 2019, replacing Myatt Snider, who was demoted to a part-time schedule in the team's No. 27 truck. On June 18, 2019, Sauter was suspended for the Gateway race after intentionally wrecking Austin Hill at Iowa. Snider was announced to substitute for Sauter at Gateway.
- On February 15, 2019, it was announced that Raphaël Lessard would drive the No. 46 for Kyle Busch Motorsports at Martinsville, Dover, and Bristol. On February 21, 2019, it was announced that Chandler Smith would drive the No. 46 at Gateway and ISM Raceway, and would drive the No. 51 for Kyle Busch Motorsports at Iowa and Bristol.
- On February 22, 2019, it was announced that U.S. Navy officer Jesse Iwuji would drive for Reaume Brothers Racing at Las Vegas.
- On March 21, 2019, AM Racing announced that Bubba Wallace would race the No. 22 Chevrolet at Martinsville. Wallace would also drive the truck in the next race at Texas after the truck's normal driver, Austin Wayne Self, was suspended indefinitely on April 1, 2019, for violating NASCAR's substance abuse policy. Self's suspension was lifted on April 30, 2019, after he completed the Road to Recovery Program.
- On March 23, 2019, it was announced that Angela Ruch would be joining Niece Motorsports driving the No. 44 truck for 12 races. She had started the season driving a select number of races in the No. 8 for NEMCO Motorsports, including Daytona where she got a top 10 finish, but there were more races open for her to run at Niece. She ended up not running in all of her originally scheduled races, leading some to think that she left the team, however, she returned at Bristol in August (her last race being two months prior). Reporter Chris Knight tweeted on August 15, 2019, that she would drive the No. 44 for the rest of the year except for Canada.
- On March 28, 2019, Kyle Busch Motorsports announced that former Roush Fenway Racing Cup Series driver Greg Biffle would come out of retirement to drive the No. 51 Toyota at Texas.
- On June 7, 2019, Ross Chastain announced that he would be running for Truck Series championship points instead of chasing the NASCAR Xfinity Series championship. Because of this last-minute decision, his Truck Series points started at the June Texas race, and his win at Kansas did not count to lock himself into the playoffs.
- On June 13, 2019, Dylan Lupton announced that he would join DGR-Crosley for six Truck Series races starting at Chicagoland.
- On July 23, 2019, Niece Motorsports announced that Bayley Currey would drive the No. 44 Chevrolet at Pocono and Michigan. On August 15, Currey was indefinitely suspended for violating NASCAR's Substance Abuse Policy. On September 18, he was reinstated by NASCAR after successfully completing his Road to Recovery Program.
- On July 24, 2019, NEMCO Motorsports announced that dirt racer Colt Gilliam would drive their No. 8 Chevrolet at the Eldora Dirt Derby. John Hunter Nemechek was originally scheduled for this race, but had a commitment with GMS in the Xfinity Series.
- On July 25, 2019, DGR-Crosley announced that dirt racer Kyle Strickler would drive their No. 54 Toyota at the Eldora Dirt Derby (instead of normal driver Natalie Decker).
- On July 25, 2019, Jordan Anderson announced that ARCA driver Carson Hocevar would drive his No. 3 Chevrolet at the Eldora Dirt Derby (instead of himself).
- On July 26, 2019, Reaume Brothers Racing announced that Devin Dodson would make his series debut in the No. 34 Chevrolet in the Eldora Dirt Derby. Dodson later ended up driving the No. 32 in that race, swapping trucks with teammate Mason Massey.
- On September 4, 2019, it was announced that four-time Las Vegas Motor Speedway Bullring track champion Justin Johnson would make his Truck Series return in the Kart Idaho Racing No. 08 Toyota at Las Vegas. It was his first start in the series since 2011.
- On September 11, 2019, it was announced that Colin Garrett will make his Truck debut in the Niece Motorsports No. 38 Chevrolet at Las Vegas.
- On November 4, 2019, it was announced that Ty Majeski would drive the Niece Motorsports No. 44 Chevrolet at Phoenix.

==== Crew chiefs ====
- In January 2019, it was announced that Frank Kerr had joined DGR-Crosley to be crew chief for Natalie Decker in her part-time Truck and ARCA schedules in the No. 54 truck and car, respectively. Kerr crew chiefed for TriStar Motorsports (which closed down) for the last three years on the No. 44 Xfinity car and then the No. 72 Cup car. Kerr replaced Kevin Manion who moved to the No. 17 DGR-Crosley truck which expanded to full-time in 2019 after running part-time in 2018.
- On January 22, 2019, it was announced that Phil Gould would be the crew chief for the No. 45 truck of Ross Chastain and Reid Wilson for Niece Motorsports. Gould was previously the crew chief for Ryan Reed's No. 16 Xfinity Series team for Roush, which closed down. He replaced Matt Weber, who was the last of five different crew chiefs the No. 45 team had in 2018. Weber went back to the ARCA Menards Series working for Chad Bryant Racing.
- On January 25, 2019, Jesse Little announced that J.R. Norris would be his crew chief in 2019, replacing Matt Noyce, who would later move over to ThorSport Racing, who his team has an alliance with. Norris' last time as a crew chief was in 2016 where he briefly crew chiefed the No. 81 (now the No. 16) Hattori Racing Enterprises truck for both Little and Ryan Truex, and then as the first ever crew chief for Niece Motorsports late that year with driver Casey Smith. After just two races, Norris was replaced by Bill Henderson. Henderson was not a crew chief for any team in 2018, but he did crew chief both the No. 22 AM Racing truck and the No. 33 Win-Tron Racing ARCA car in 2017.
- On January 29, 2019, Kyle Busch Motorsports announced its 2019 crew chief lineup: Ryan Fugle in the No. 51, Mike Hillman Jr. in the No. 18, and Marcus Richmond in the No. 4. On June 5, 2019, KBM announced changes to their crew chief lineup, with Marcus Richmond moving from Todd Gilliland's No. 4 to their part-time No. 46 truck and Michael Shelton (who had been crew chiefing the No. 46) and Wes Ward sharing crew chief duties for the No. 4.
- On February 5, 2019, Eddie Troconis was announced as the crew chief for the No. 22 AM Racing team in 2019 (after the team broke back away from Niece Motorsports). He was previously a crew chief with ThorSport Racing for three years, crew chiefing the No. 13 truck of Cameron Hayley in 2016 and then the No. 27/41 (now the No. 99) truck of Ben Rhodes for the next two years.
- On February 11, 2019, it was revealed (through the Daytona entry list) that Matt Noyce would be the new crew chief for Ben Rhodes at ThorSport Racing after Troconis left for AM Racing. In 2018 (as well as 2016), Noyce was the crew chief for Jesse Little's team (which has an alliance with ThorSport).
- On July 9, 2019, Jordan Anderson tweeted that Wally Rogers had replaced Kevin Eagle (who got a job with Niece Motorsports as the No. 44 crew chief) as crew chief for his No. 3 Chevrolet. Rogers was previously crew chief of Korbin Forrister's No. 7 Toyota.
- On July 22, 2019, GMS Racing announced that Jeff Stankiewicz will replace Doug Randolph as the crew chief of the No. 2 Chevrolet driven by Sheldon Creed. The duo won the ARCA Menards Series title in 2018. On August 6, 2019, NASCAR suspended Stankiewicz, truck chief Austin Pollak, and engineer Jonathan Stewart for three races through September 10 after the No. 2 truck was discovered to have a ballast container violation during post-race inspection following the 2019 Eldora Dirt Derby. Darren Fraley will serve as interim crew chief during Stankiewicz's suspension.
- On July 26, 2019, Young's Motorsports announced that Ryan London would replace Jeff Stankiewicz as the crew chief of the No. 12 Chevrolet driven by Gus Dean after Stankiewicz reunited with Creed at GMS Racing. London previously worked for GMS and the closed Mason Mitchell Motorsports team as a Truck and ARCA crew chief, respectfully.

== Rule changes ==
- On February 4, 2019, NASCAR announced a new post-race inspection rule in all three series, where race-winning teams found to be in violation of the rule book will automatically be disqualified. Following a race, the first-place and second-place teams, along with at least one randomly selected car, will undergo post-race inspection. The inspection should take between 90 minutes and two hours to complete before the race winner is officially declared. The car that fails the inspection will receive last-place points and will be stripped of playoff and stage points.
  - At the 2019 M&M's 200 at Iowa Speedway on June 16, 2019, Ross Chastain became the first NGOTS driver to be disqualified under this rule after his truck was discovered to be too low on the front during post-race inspection. His win was given to second-place finisher Brett Moffitt. Chastain became the first race winner to be disqualified since Dale Jarrett in 1995.
- On February 4, 2019, NASCAR announced the introduction of the Triple Truck Challenge. The three-race program gives drivers the chance to win bonus money. Set to take place at Texas on June 7, Iowa on June 15, and Gateway on June 22, the winning team collects a $50,000 bonus on any of the three events. The team that wins two of the three races collects an additional $150,000, while winning all three races results in a total bonus of $500,000. Only drivers who declare points for the Gander Outdoors Truck Series are eligible for the Triple Truck Challenge.
- On February 4, 2019, NASCAR announced a change in the qualifying schedule procedures for majority of its tracks. For short tracks and intermediate speedways, the first round will be shortened from 15 minutes to 10 minutes, while the second and third rounds will remain at 10 and five minutes, respectively. The down time intervals at all tracks will be reduced from seven minutes to five minutes. Superspeedway qualifications will retain their untimed two-round intervals of single-lap qualifying while road courses will continue to use two qualifying rounds: 25 minutes for the first round and 10 minutes for the final round.
- On May 1, 2019, following continued gamesmanship and other actions causing multi-car qualifying to become "untenable," NASCAR formally returned to single-car qualifying at all oval tracks.
  - At oval tracks 1.25 miles and larger, each car will get a single timed lap.
  - At oval tracks 1.25 miles and smaller, each car will get two timed laps with the faster lap counting as their official time.
  - The qualifying order draw will be determined in part by the previous race's starting lineup. The top 20 starters from the previous race will draw to take their qualifying lap in positions 21-40 (the second half of qualifying). The remainder of cars will draw to qualify in positions 1-20.
  - The next car will be sent once the preceding car takes the white flag. This should ensure qualifying is completed in roughly 40 minutes baring any interruptions for crashes, debris, or weather.
  - There will be two-minute TV breaks built into qualifying to ensure every car gets covered live during the session.
  - Broadcasters FOX and NBC have committed to using ghost car graphics and impose other technologies to make the session more exciting to TV viewers.
  - Each car must complete their lap for the session to be counted, otherwise all times will be erased and cars will start by owner points.
  - Multi-car qualifying will remain at road course events.

== Schedule ==
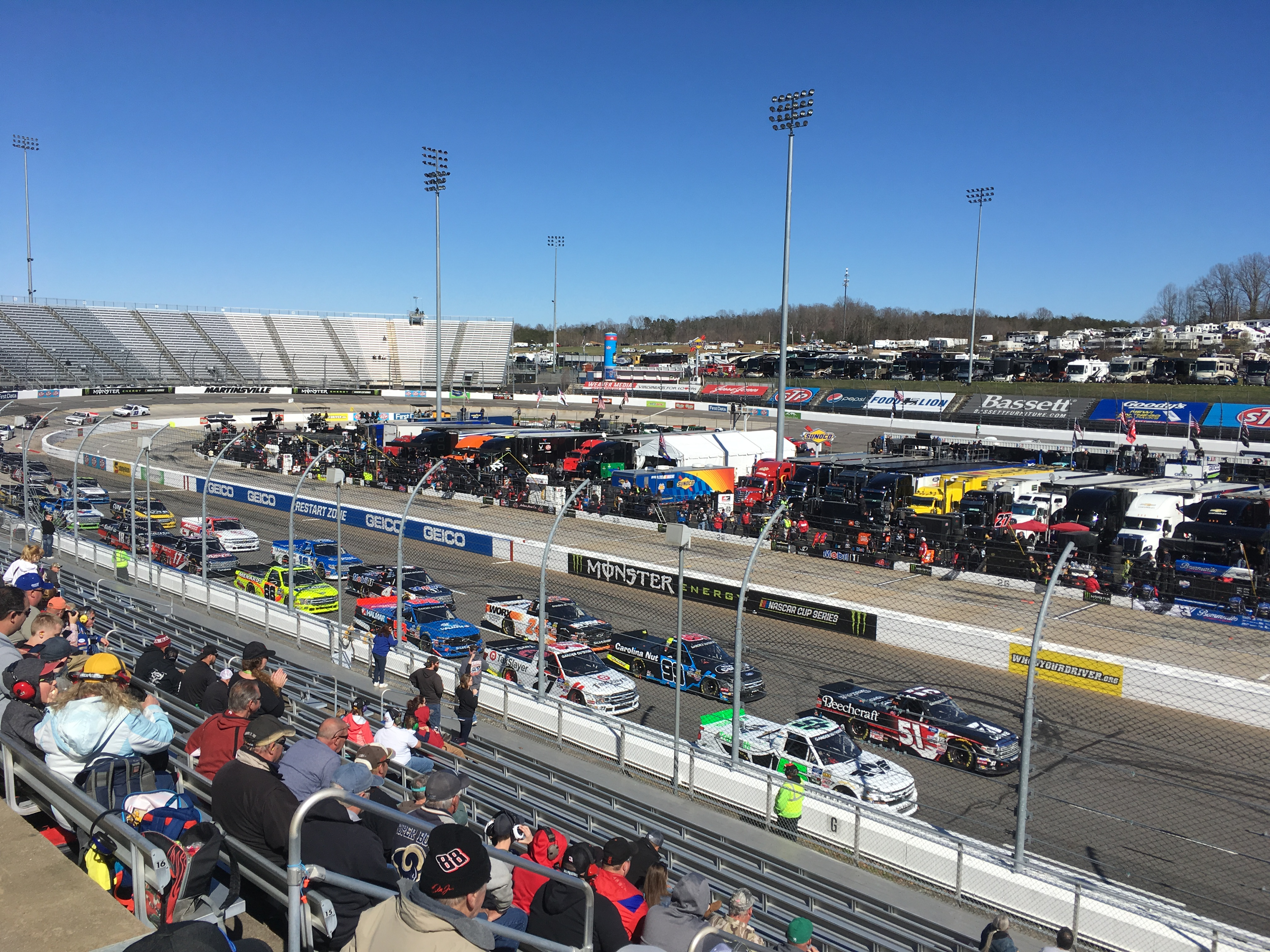
The TruNorth Global 250 at Martinsville Speedway in March

The schedule for the 2019 season was released on June 13, 2018. The only changes are the Eldora Dirt Derby and the Gander RV 150 switching spots and the Vankor 350 being moved from the second race of the Round of 6 to the fifth race of the season, with the rest of the races afterwards being bumped one spot back as a result.

- The Triple Truck Challenge races are listed in **bold**.

No	Race title	Track	Location	Date	Start time (et)	TV
1	NextEra Energy 250	Daytona International Speedway	Daytona Beach, Florida	February 15	7:30 p.m.	FS1
2	Ultimate Tailgating 200	Atlanta Motor Speedway	Hampton, Georgia	February 23	4:30 p.m.	FS1
3	Strat 200	Las Vegas Motor Speedway	Las Vegas, Nevada	March 1	9:00 p.m.	FS1
4	TruNorth Global 250	Martinsville Speedway	Ridgeway, Virginia	March 23	2:00 p.m.	Fox
5	Vankor 350	Texas Motor Speedway	Fort Worth, Texas	March 29	9:00 p.m.	FS1
6	JEGS 200	Dover International Speedway	Dover, Delaware	May 3	5:00 p.m.	FS1
7	Digital Ally 250	Kansas Speedway	Kansas City, Kansas	May 10	8:30 p.m.	FS1
8	North Carolina Education Lottery 200	Charlotte Motor Speedway	Concord, North Carolina	May 17	8:30 p.m.	FS1
9	**SpeedyCash.com 400**	Texas Motor Speedway	Fort Worth, Texas	June 7	9:00 p.m.	FS1
10	**M&M's 200**	Iowa Speedway	Newton, Iowa	June 16 (Note: The Iowa race was postponed to Sunday, June 16, due to rain.)	12:00 p.m.	FS1
11	**CarShield 200 presented by CK Power**	World Wide Technology Raceway	Madison, Illinois	June 22	10:00 p.m.	FS1
12	Camping World 225	Chicagoland Speedway	Joliet, Illinois	June 28	9:00 p.m.	FS1
13	Buckle Up in Your Truck 225	Kentucky Speedway	Sparta, Kentucky	July 11	7:30 p.m.	FS1
14	Gander RV 150	Pocono Raceway	Long Pond, Pennsylvania	July 27	1:00 p.m.	Fox
15	Eldora Dirt Derby	Eldora Speedway	Allen Township, Darke County, Ohio	August 1	9:00 p.m.	FS1
16	Corrigan Oil 200	Michigan International Speedway	Cambridge Township, Michigan	August 10	1:00 p.m.	FS1
NASCAR Gander Outdoors Truck Series Playoffs						
Round of 8						
17	UNOH 200	Bristol Motor Speedway	Bristol, Tennessee	August 15	8:30 p.m.	FS1
18	Chevrolet Silverado 250	Canadian Tire Motorsport Park	Clarington, Ontario, Canada	August 25	2:30 p.m.	FS1
19	World of Westgate 200	Las Vegas Motor Speedway	Las Vegas, Nevada	September 13	9:00 p.m.	FS1
Round of 6						
20	Sugarlands Shine 250	Talladega Superspeedway	Lincoln, Alabama	October 12	1:30 p.m.	FS1
21	NASCAR Hall of Fame 200	Martinsville Speedway	Ridgeway, Virginia	October 26	1:30 p.m.	FS1
22	Lucas Oil 150	ISM Raceway	Avondale, Arizona	November 8	8:30 p.m.	FS1
Championship 4						
23	Ford EcoBoost 200	Homestead–Miami Speedway	Homestead, Florida	November 15	8:00 p.m.	FS1

== Results and standings ==
=== Race results ===
No.	Race	Pole position	Most laps led	Winning driver	Manufacturer	Winning team	Report
1	NextEra Energy 250	Christian Eckes	Austin Hill	Austin Hill	Toyota	Hattori Racing Enterprises	Report
2	Ultimate Tailgating 200	Austin Hill	Kyle Busch	Kyle Busch	Toyota	Kyle Busch Motorsports	Report
3	Strat 200	Kyle Busch	Kyle Busch	Kyle Busch	Toyota	Kyle Busch Motorsports	Report
4	TruNorth Global 250	Stewart Friesen	Kyle Busch	Kyle Busch	Toyota	Kyle Busch Motorsports	Report
5	Vankor 350	Grant Enfinger	Kyle Busch	Kyle Busch	Toyota	Kyle Busch Motorsports	Report
6	JEGS 200	Brett Moffitt	Brett Moffitt	Johnny Sauter	Ford	ThorSport Racing	Report
7	Digital Ally 250	Matt Crafton	Stewart Friesen	Ross Chastain	Chevrolet	Niece Motorsports	Report
8	North Carolina Education Lottery 200	Matt Crafton	Kyle Busch	Kyle Busch	Toyota	Kyle Busch Motorsports	Report
9	SpeedyCash.com 400	Todd Gilliland	Grant Enfinger	Greg Biffle	Toyota	Kyle Busch Motorsports	Report
10	M&M's 200	Chandler Smith	Ross Chastain	Brett Moffitt (Note: Moffitt initially finished second in the race behind Ross Chastain, but was awarded the victory after Chastain was stripped of the win as a result of his truck failing post-race inspection.)	Chevrolet	GMS Racing	Report
11	CarShield 200 presented by CK Power	Christian Eckes	Christian Eckes	Ross Chastain	Chevrolet	Niece Motorsports	Report
12	Camping World 225	Austin Hill	Brett Moffitt	Brett Moffitt	Chevrolet	GMS Racing	Report
13	Buckle Up in Your Truck 225	Grant Enfinger	Tyler Ankrum	Tyler Ankrum	Toyota	DGR-Crosley	Report
14	Gander RV 150	Austin Hill	Ross Chastain	Ross Chastain	Chevrolet	Niece Motorsports	Report
15	Eldora Dirt Derby	Chase Briscoe	Chase Briscoe	Stewart Friesen	Chevrolet	Halmar Friesen Racing	Report
16	Corrigan Oil 200	Ross Chastain	Austin Hill	Austin Hill	Toyota	Hattori Racing Enterprises	Report
NASCAR Gander Outdoors Truck Series Playoffs
Round of 8
17	UNOH 200	Brett Moffitt	Ross Chastain	Brett Moffitt	Chevrolet	GMS Racing	Report
18	Chevrolet Silverado 250	Brett Moffitt	Brett Moffitt	Brett Moffitt	Chevrolet	GMS Racing	Report
19	World of Westgate 200	Christian Eckes	Ross Chastain	Austin Hill	Toyota	Hattori Racing Enterprises	Report
Round of 6
20	Sugarlands Shine 250	Matt Crafton	Johnny Sauter	Spencer Boyd	Chevrolet	Young's Motorsports	Report
21	NASCAR Hall of Fame 200	Christian Eckes	Brett Moffitt	Todd Gilliland	Toyota	Kyle Busch Motorsports	Report
22	Lucas Oil 150	Austin Hill	Ben Rhodes	Stewart Friesen	Chevrolet	Halmar Friesen Racing	Report
Championship 4
23	Ford EcoBoost 200	Stewart Friesen	Austin Hill	Austin Hill	Toyota	Hattori Racing Enterprises	Report

=== Drivers' standings ===
(key) Bold – Pole position awarded by time. Italics – Pole position set by final practice results or owner's points. * – Most laps led. ^{1} – Stage 1 winner. ^{2} – Stage 2 winner. ^{1-10} – Regular season top 10 finishers.
. – Eliminated after Round of 8 . – Eliminated after Round of 6

Pos.	Driver	DAY	ATL	LVS	MAR	TEX	DOV	KAN	CLT	TEX	IOW	GTW	CHI	KEN	POC	ELD	MCH	BRI	MSP	LVS	TAL	MAR	PHO	HOM	Pts.	Stage	Bonus
1	Matt Crafton	5	14	3	8	5	5	**6**	**5**^{1}	2	7^{1}	9	8	13^{2}	6	10	10	7	11	30	**8**	23	6	2	4035	–	11^{3}
2	Ross Chastain	3^{†}	6^{†}	10^{†}	4^{2†}	7^{†}	10^{†}	1^{†}	10^{†}	10	32*	1	7	4	1*^{1}	12	**30**^{1}	3*^{1}	8^{2}	2*^{12}	22	2	9	4	4033	–	16
3	Brett Moffitt	26	4	2	3	19	**2***^{1}	8	19	11	1	5	1*	7	5	29	4^{2}	**1**^{2}	**1***^{1}	7	4	29*^{1}	10	5	4032	–	34^{2}
4	Stewart Friesen	10	18	4	**5**	2	12	15*^{12}	3	20	5	3	3	2	32	1	8	4	7	19	5^{2}	6	1	11	4026	–	14^{4}
NASCAR Gander Outdoors Truck Series Playoffs cut-off
Pos.	Driver	DAY	ATL	LVS	MAR	TEX	DOV	KAN	CLT	TEX	IOW	GTW	CHI	KEN	POC	ELD	MCH	BRI	MSP	LVS	TAL	MAR	PHO	HOM	Pts.	Stage	Bonus
5	Austin Hill	1*	7	30	16	27	7	4	6	8	12	11	**5**	31	**30**	32	1*	10	5	1	6	26	**13**	1*^{12}	2298	37	17^{9}
6	Johnny Sauter	23^{2}	2	8	9	3	1^{2}	22	17	13^{1}	27		18	10	8	21	12	11	6	29	14*	3	8	6	2238	46	9^{10}
7	Grant Enfinger	2	3	11	7	**4**^{1}	4	7	9	4*	4	6^{12}	16^{2}	**24**	10	3	7	5	13	31	10	4	5	7	2236	30	19^{1}
8	Tyler Ankrum **(R)**				19	6	9	11	27	3	31	30	13	1*	2	9	25	20	9	11	7	25	26	22	2182	19	5
9	Ben Rhodes	14	5	25	2	10	6	2	4	21^{2}	2^{2}	8	32	19	9	14	23	8	3	8	12	16	4*^{1}	12	773	182	9^{5}
10	Sheldon Creed **(R)**	17^{1}	12	6	17	22	27	19	12	6	6	7	11	21^{1}	25	2	2	6	4	4	9^{1}	11	12	9	726	142	5^{8}
11	Todd Gilliland	19	9	7	15	14	15	3	7	**27**	10	2	6	17	7	5	24	9	18	5	2	1	14	8	723	134	9^{7}
12	Harrison Burton **(R)**	18	8	5	11	31	3	10	11	5	3	16	4	3	3^{2}	31	11	23	21	9	11	18	7	13	707	108	6^{6}
13	Tyler Dippel **(R)**	29	11	17	23	8	18	12	13	25	19	15	12	12	11	8	3	24		26	31	30	15	18	454	25	–
14	Austin Wayne Self	9	27	15			19	27	21	19	14	17	25	6	15	13	5	15	14	17	29	19	18	19	442	28	–
15	Gus Dean **(R)**	15	15	22	32	29	14	14	26	32	20	19	15	25	14	28	13	18	17	15	20	14	20	15	413	14	–
16	Jordan Anderson	25	19	21	26	21	21	13	15	15	18	18	20	30	13		14	28	16	14	21	12	28	21	397	12	–
17	Spencer Boyd **(R)**	4	25	29	27	11	22	17	22	23	16	20	17	29	18		22			20	1	15			338	6	5
18	Brennan Poole **(R)**	24	13	20	29	9	23		2	7	11			15				19		6	26				300	23	–
19	Natalie Decker **(R)**	32	24	13			17	25	31	22	17	27	14	27	16		27	25		25	16	22	22	20	281	–	–
20	Christian Eckes	**22**										14*			4	6	15			**3**		**17**		3	271	59	–
21	Jennifer Jo Cobb	DNQ	22	27		18	25	23	DNQ	18	25	24	21	22	21	19	19	22	23	24	27	27	DNQ	28	268	–	–
22	Anthony Alfredo **(R)**		17	18		28			8	12		12	9		31		26			12	15		24	32	240	3	–
23	Josh Reaume	6	30	23		32	31	20	28	14		23			20		18		26			31		Wth	179	–	–
24	Chandler Smith										8	4						2					3		171	40	–
25	Norm Benning	DNQ	29	28	DNQ	DNQ	32	21		17	24	25	29	DNQ	22	22	32		24		18	24			171	–	–
26	Jesse Little		23	19		13	29		14		22	21						32					DNQ	17	149	2	–
27	Cory Roper	20	16	24	31	12			20	9							28	DNQ		DNQ				27	146	–	–
28	Dylan Lupton												10	5				27	19	10			16	DNQ	145	10	–
29	Codie Rohrbaugh	DNQ			DNQ	23			29	30				14			17	DNQ		16	24	10		26	144	–	–
30	Joe Nemechek	16	32			25	26	24	32	28			28	32	28		20						32	14	144	–	–
31	Angela Ruch	8		16		30		16	23	29								30		22	28			29	139	–	–
32	Raphaël Lessard				14		11				9							12	10						135	6	–
33	Ray Ciccarelli	28	26		DNQ	16	24							DNQ	19		9		29			21		31	130	–	–
34	Korbin Forrister	DNQ	21	14	25	24	30		25												13				107	–	–
35	Timothy Peters	7	10	12					DNQ									DNQ			23				98	2	–
36	Myatt Snider	21			6							10													94	20	–
37	Mason Massey										21		26	18	17	23				28	32				94	–	–
38	Spencer Davis	DNQ			20								27	8						18				DNQ	81	6	–
39	Jesse Iwuji			26		17							22				21			QL	19				80	–	–
40	Clay Greenfield	12												16				26			25				73	4	–
41	Parker Kligerman		20															13						10	72	4	–
42	Tyler Hill						20				26			11						DNQ				23	68	–	–
43	Derek Kraus				18		8													27			31	DNQ	64	–	–
44	Riley Herbst							9^{‡}			15										3				61	5	–
45	Tony Mrakovich				DNQ					26					12					13					60	–	–
46	Tanner Gray																					20	17	16	59	1	–
47	David Gilliland	13			12																				56	7	–
48	Bayley Currey					Wth		29							23		6								54	1	–
49	Kyle Benjamin									31	13	13													54	–	–
50	Sam Mayer																	21				28^{2}	19		54	10	–
51	Danny Bohn																					8	27	25	53	2	–
52	Chad Finley		28						18		28			26											48	–	–
53	Greg Biffle									1															45	5	5
54	Trey Hutchens								DNQ	24	29						16								42	–	–
55	Bryan Dauzat	31													24						17				39	–	–
56	Alex Tagliani																		2						38	3	–
57	Mike Marlar															4									36	3	–
58	Landon Huffman															24		16							34	–	–
59	Ryan Reed			9																					31	3	–
60	T. J. Bell							26							26		29								30	–	–
61	Colby Howard																						21	24	29	–	–
62	Carson Hocevar															25							23		29	3	–
63	Kyle Strickler															18									27	8	–
64	Bobby Gerhart	11																							26	–	–
65	Justin Shipley															11									26	–	–
66	Ty Majeski																						11		26	–	–
67	Scott Stenzel			32						16															26	–	–
68	Daniel Sasnett				30							26			29		DNQ								26	–	–
69	Gary Klutt																		12						25	–	–
70	Bryant Barnhill											22			27										25	–	–
71	Dawson Cram				DNQ																	13			24	–	–
72	D. J. Kennington																		15						23	1	–
73	Mark Smith															15									22	–	–
74	Reid Wilson				24		28																		22	–	–
75	Tim Ward															16									21	–	–
76	Darwin Peters Jr.															17									20	–	–
77	Jason White	DNQ																	20						17	–	–
78	Jeffrey Abbey															20									17	–	–
79	Bobby Reuse																		22						15	–	–
80	Justin Johnson																			23					14	–	–
81	Gregory Rayl											32							28						14	–	–
82	Cody McMahan											29										32			13	–	–
83	Roger Reuse																		25						12	–	–
84	Kyle Plott																						25		12	–	–
85	Jake Griffin															26									11	–	–
86	Chris Fontaine	27																							10	–	–
87	Colt Gilliam															27									10	–	–
88	Dan Corcoran																		27						10	–	–
89	Travis Kvapil				28																				9	–	–
90	Josh Bilicki							18^{±}	DNQ				19^{±}	20^{±}										30	7	–	–
91	Juan Manuel González				DNQ						30														7	–	–
92	Robby Lyons	30																							7	–	–
93	Devin Dodson															30									7	–	–
94	Carson Ware																						30		7	–	–
95	Lou Goss											31						DNQ							6	–	–
	Ted Minor									DNQ															0	–	–
Ineligible for Gander Outdoors Truck Series championship points
Pos.	Driver	DAY	ATL	LVS	MAR	TEX	DOV	KAN	CLT	TEX	IOW	GTW	CHI	KEN	POC	ELD	MCH	BRI	MSP	LVS	TAL	MAR	PHO	HOM	Pts.	Stage	Bonus
	Kyle Busch		1*^{12}	**1***^{12}	1*^{1}	1*^{2}			1*^{2}																		
	Brandon Jones						13	5					2^{1}	23									2^{2}				
	Timmy Hill		31		21	26		28	16				24					17				5					
	John Hunter Nemechek																	29		32	30	7	29				
	Chase Briscoe															**7***^{12}											
	Jeb Burton													9								9					
	Bubba Wallace				10	20																					
	Austin Dillon				13																						
	Ryan Sieg						16											14									
	Garrett Smithley					15																					
	Colin Garrett																			21							
	Austin Theriault	DNQ			22																						
	Camden Murphy								30			28	23	28			31							DNQ			
	C. J. McLaughlin										23																
	Stefan Parsons			31					24																		
	Joey Gase							30					31														
	B. J. McLeod		DNQ										30														
	J. J. Yeley																	31									
Pos.	Driver	DAY	ATL	LVS	MAR	TEX	DOV	KAN	CLT	TEX	IOW	GTW	CHI	KEN	POC	ELD	MCH	BRI	MSP	LVS	TAL	MAR	PHO	HOM	Pts.	Stage	Bonus
^{†} – Ross Chastain started receiving points at Texas 2.^{‡} – Riley Herbst started receiving points at Iowa.^{±} – Josh Bilicki started receiving points at Homestead-Miami.

=== Owners' championship (Top 15) ===
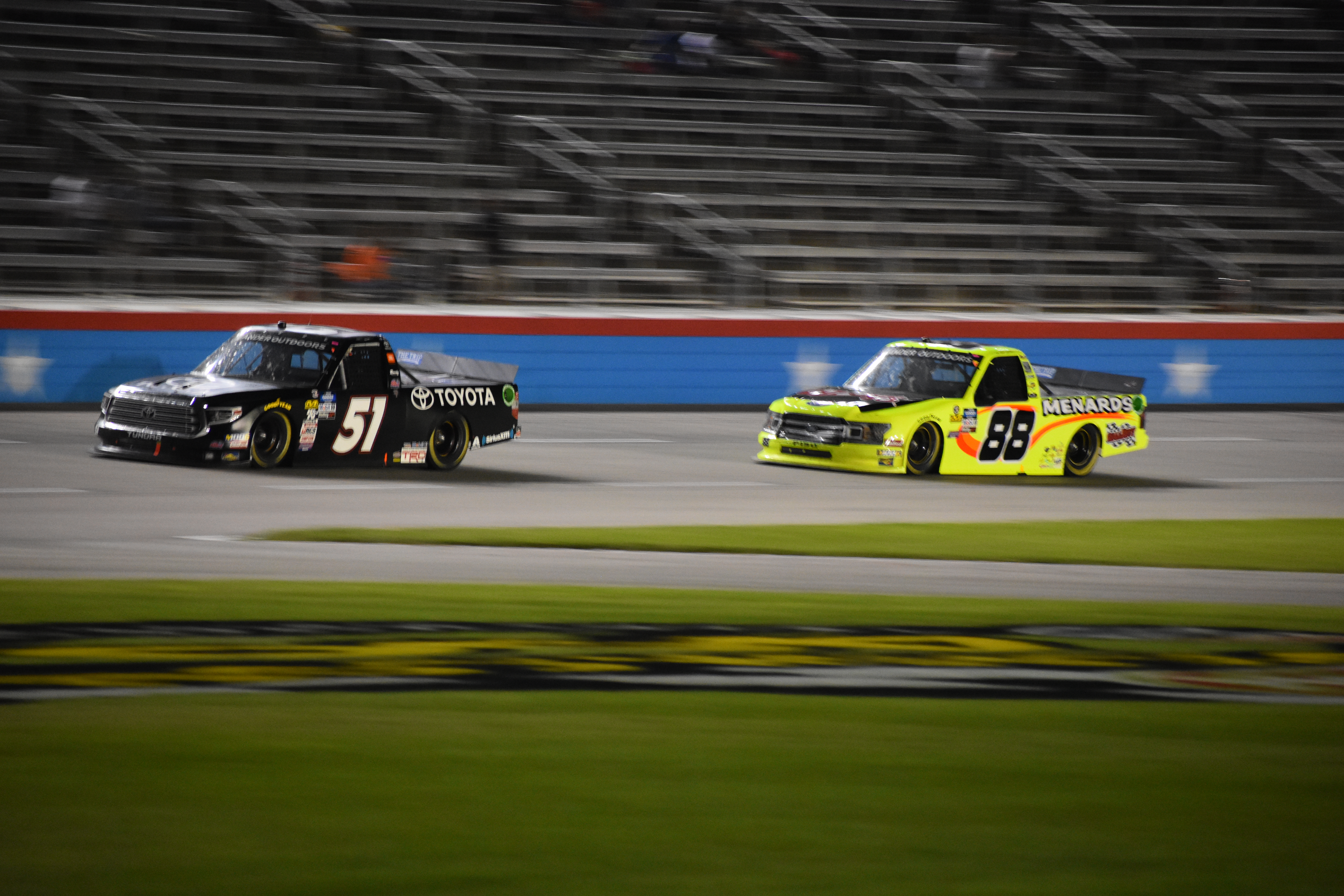
Greg Biffle's win at Texas Motor Speedway locked the No. 51 Kyle Busch Motorsports truck into the owners' playoffs. Biffle's victory produced split championships as it kept Matt Crafton's No. 88 ThorSport Racing truck outside of the playoff picture.

(key) Bold – Pole position awarded by time. Italics – Pole position set by final practice results or rainout. * – Most laps led. ^{1} – Stage 1 winner. ^{2} – Stage 2 winner. ^{1-10} – Owners' regular season top 10 finishers.
. – Eliminated after Round of 8 . – Eliminated after Round of 6

Pos.	No.	Car Owner	DAY	ATL	LVS	MAR	TEX	DOV	KAN	CLT	TEX	IOW	GTW	CHI	KEN	POC	ELD	MCH	BRI	MSP	LVS	TAL	MAR	PHO	HOM	Points	Bonus
1	51	Kyle Busch	**22**	1*^{12}	**1***^{12}	1*^{1}	1*^{2}	13	5	1*^{2}	1	8	14*	2^{1}	23	4	6	15	2	2	**3**	3	**17**	2^{2}	3	4034	15^{2}
2	45	Al Niece	3	6	10	4^{2}	7	10	1	10	31	13	1	7	4	1*^{1}	12	**30**^{1}	3*^{1}	8^{2}	2*^{12}	22	2	9	4	4033	21^{6}
3	24	Maurice J. Gallagher Jr.	26	4	2	3	19	**2***^{1}	8	19	11	1	5	1*	7	5	29	4^{2}	**1**^{2}	**1***^{1}	7	4	29*^{1}	10	5	4032	32^{3}
4	52	Chris Larsen	10	18	4	**5**	2	12	15*^{12}	3	20	5	3	3	2	32	1	8	4	7	19	5^{2}	6	1	11	4026	13^{5}
NASCAR Gander Outdoors Truck Series Playoffs cut-off
5	16	Shigeaki Hattori	1*	7	30	16	27	7	4	6	8	12	11	**5**	31	**30**	32	1*	10	5	1	6	26	**13**	1*^{12}	2296	15
6	13	Duke Thorson	23^{2}	2	8	9	3	1^{2}	22	17	13^{1}	27	10	18	10	8	21	12	11	6	29	14*	3	8	6	2237	8
7	98	Mike Curb	2	3	11	7	**4**^{1}	4	7	9	4*	4	6^{12}	16^{2}	**24**	10	3	7	5	13	31	10	4	5	7	2236	19^{1}
8	17	David Gilliland	13	17	9	19	6	9	11	27	3	9	12	13	1*	2	9	25	20	9	5	7	25	26	22	2182	5
9	88	Rhonda Thorson	5	14	3	8	5	5	**6**	**4**^{1}	2	7^{1}	9	8	13^{2}	6	10	10	7	11	30	**8**	23	6	2	841	–
10	99	Duke Thorson	14	5	25	2	10	6	2	4	21^{2}	2^{2}	8	32	19	9	14	23	8	3	8	12	16	4*^{1}	12	773	–
11	2	Maurice J. Gallagher Jr.	17^{1}	12	6	17	22	27	19	12	6	6	7	11	21^{1}	25	2	2	6	4	4	9^{1}	11	12	9	726	–
12	4	Kyle Busch	19	9	7	15	14	15	3	7	**27**	10	2	6	17	7	5	24	9	18	5	2	1	14	8	723	–
13	18	Kyle Busch	18	8	5	11	31	3	10	11	5	3	16	4	3	3^{2}	31	11	23	21	9	11	18	7	13	707	–
14	22	Tim Self	9	27	15	10	20	19	27	21	19	14	17	25	6	15	13	5	15	14	17	29	19	18	19	489	–
15	02	Randy Young	29	11	17	23	8	18	12	13	25	19	15	12	12	11	8	3	24	15	26	31	30	15	18	477	–
Pos.	No.	Car Owner	DAY	ATL	LVS	MAR	TEX	DOV	KAN	CLT	TEX	IOW	GTW	CHI	KEN	POC	ELD	MCH	BRI	MSP	LVS	TAL	MAR	PHO	HOM	Points	Bonus

=== Manufacturers' Championship ===
Pos	Manufacturer	Wins	Points
1	Toyota	12	860
2	Chevrolet	10	844
3	Ford	1	759

== See also ==
- 2019 Monster Energy NASCAR Cup Series
- 2019 NASCAR Xfinity Series
- 2019 ARCA Menards Series
- 2019 NASCAR K&N Pro Series East
- 2019 NASCAR K&N Pro Series West
- 2019 NASCAR Whelen Modified Tour
- 2019 NASCAR PEAK Mexico Series
- 2019 NASCAR Whelen Euro Series
- 2019 NASCAR Pinty's Series
