= 2018 ToyotaCare 250 =

Eighth race of the 2018 NASCAR Xfinity Series

Race details
- Race 8 of 33 of the 2018 NASCAR Xfinity Series
- Date: April 20, 2018
- Official name: 31st Annual ToyotaCare 250
- Location: Richmond, Virginia, Richmond Raceway
- Course: Permanent racing facility
- Course length: 0.75 miles (1.21 km)
- Distance: 250 laps, 187.5 mi (301.752 km)
- Scheduled distance: 250 laps, 187.5 mi (301.752 km)
- Average speed: 93.284 miles per hour (150.126 km/h)

Pole position
Driver	Cole Custer	Stewart-Haas Racing with Biagi-DenBeste
- Time: 22.253

Most laps led
Driver	Christopher Bell	Joe Gibbs Racing
- Laps: 120

Winner
No. 20	Christopher Bell	Joe Gibbs Racing

Television in the United States
- Network: Fox Sports 1
- Announcers: Adam Alexander, Michael Waltrip, Kevin Harvick

Radio in the United States
- Radio: Motor Racing Network

The 2018 ToyotaCare 250 was the eighth stock car race of the 2018 NASCAR Xfinity Series season and the 31st iteration of the event. The race was held on Friday, April 20, 2018, in Richmond, Virginia at Richmond Raceway, a 0.75 miles (1.21 km) D-shaped oval. The race took the scheduled 250 laps to complete. At race's end, Christopher Bell of Joe Gibbs Racing would dominate the late stages of the race to win his second career NASCAR Xfinity Series win and his first of the season. To fill out the podium, Noah Gragson of Joe Gibbs Racing and Elliott Sadler of JR Motorsports would finish second and third, respectively.

== Background ==
The layout of Richmond Raceway, the venue where the race was held.

Richmond Raceway (RR), formerly known as Richmond International Raceway (RIR), is a 3/4-mile (1.2 km), D-shaped, asphalt race track located just outside Richmond, Virginia in Henrico County. It hosts the NASCAR Cup Series, the NASCAR Xfinity Series, NASCAR Camping World Truck Series and the IndyCar series. Known as "America's premier short track", it formerly hosted two USAC sprint car races.

=== Entry list ===
#	Driver	Team	Make	Sponsor
0	Garrett Smithley	JD Motorsports	Chevrolet	FAME USA
00	Cole Custer	Stewart-Haas Racing with Biagi-DenBeste	Ford	Code 3 Associates
1	Elliott Sadler	JR Motorsports	Chevrolet	Chevrolet Accessories
01	Vinnie Miller	JD Motorsports	Chevrolet	JAS Expedited Trucking
2	Matt Tifft	Richard Childress Racing	Chevrolet	National Brain Tumor Society
3	Jeb Burton	Richard Childress Racing	Chevrolet	Estes Express Lines
4	Ross Chastain	JD Motorsports	Chevrolet	US Vets 911
5	Michael Annett	JR Motorsports	Chevrolet	Pilot Flying J
7	Justin Allgaier	JR Motorsports	Chevrolet	Hellmann's
8	Tommy Joe Martins	B. J. McLeod Motorsports	Chevrolet	B. J. McLeod Motorsports
9	Tyler Reddick	JR Motorsports	Chevrolet	BurgerFi
11	Ryan Truex	Kaulig Racing	Chevrolet	Bar Harbor
15	Joe Nemechek	JD Motorsports	Chevrolet	Safeway
16	Ryan Reed	Roush Fenway Racing	Ford	DriveDownA1C.com
18	Noah Gragson	Joe Gibbs Racing	Toyota	Switch "Motivated By Invention. Driven By Perfection."
19	Brandon Jones	Joe Gibbs Racing	Toyota	Mobil 1, Toyota Service Centers
20	Christopher Bell	Joe Gibbs Racing	Toyota	Rheem
21	Daniel Hemric	Richard Childress Racing	Chevrolet	South Point Hotel, Casino & Spa
22	Austin Cindric	Team Penske	Ford	Fitzgerald Glider Kits
23	Spencer Gallagher	GMS Racing	Chevrolet	Allegiant Air
24	Kaz Grala	JGL Racing	Ford	Nettts
28	Tony Mrakovich	JGL Racing	Ford	Smart Emissions Reducer
35	Joey Gase	Go Green Racing with SS-Green Light Racing	Chevrolet	Sparks Energy
36	Alex Labbé	DGM Racing	Chevrolet	Wholey's, Can-Am
38	J. J. Yeley	RSS Racing	Chevrolet	Superior Essex
39	Ryan Sieg	RSS Racing	Chevrolet	Mike D's BBQ
40	Chad Finchum	MBM Motorsports	Toyota	Smithbilt Homes
42	John Hunter Nemechek	Chip Ganassi Racing	Chevrolet	Fire Alarm Services
45	Josh Bilicki	JP Motorsports	Toyota	Prevagen
51	Jeremy Clements	Jeremy Clements Racing	Chevrolet	RepairableVehicles.com
52	David Starr	Jimmy Means Racing	Chevrolet	Circle Track Warehouse, DAI Dealer Associates
55	Stephen Leicht	JP Motorsports	Toyota	Jani-King "The King of Clean"
60	Chase Briscoe	Roush Fenway Racing	Ford	NutriChomps
66	Timmy Hill	MBM Motorsports	Dodge	CrashClaimsR.Us, Chris Kyle Memorial Benefit
74	Mike Harmon	Mike Harmon Racing	Dodge	Shadow Warriors Project, Horizon Transport
76	Spencer Boyd	SS-Green Light Racing	Chevrolet	Grunt Style "This We'll Defend"
78	B. J. McLeod	B. J. McLeod Motorsports	Chevrolet	B. J. McLeod Motorsports
89	Morgan Shepherd	Shepherd Racing Ventures	Chevrolet	Visone RV
90	Brandon Brown	Brandonbilt Motorsports	Chevrolet	W. G. Speeks
93	Jeff Green	RSS Racing	Chevrolet	RSS Racing
Official entry list

== Practice ==
=== First practice ===
The first practice session would occur on Friday, April 20, at 8:00 AM EST, and would last for 45 minutes. Both Christopher Bell of Joe Gibbs Racing and Cole Custer of Stewart-Haas Racing with Biagi-DenBeste would set the fastest lap in the session, with a time of 22.149 and an average speed of 121.902 miles per hour (196.182 km/h).

Pos.	#	Driver	Team	Make	Time	Speed
1	20	Christopher Bell	Joe Gibbs Racing	Toyota	22.149	121.902
2	00	Cole Custer	Stewart-Haas Racing with Biagi-DenBeste	Ford	22.149	121.902
3	18	Noah Gragson	Joe Gibbs Racing	Toyota	22.151	121.891
Full first practice results

=== Second and final practice ===
The second and final practice session, sometimes referred to as Happy Hour, would occur on Friday, April 20, at 9:40 AM EST, and would last for 45 minutes. John Hunter Nemechek of Chip Ganassi Racing would set the fastest lap in the session, with a time of 22.672 and an average speed of 119.090 miles per hour (191.657 km/h).

Pos.	#	Driver	Team	Make	Time	Speed
1	42	John Hunter Nemechek	Chip Ganassi Racing	Chevrolet	22.672	119.090
2	7	Justin Allgaier	JR Motorsports	Chevrolet	22.685	119.021
3	18	Noah Gragson	Joe Gibbs Racing	Toyota	22.688	119.006
Full Happy Hour practice results

== Qualifying ==
Qualifying would occur on Friday, April 20, at 4:05 PM EST. Since Richmond Raceway is under 2 miles (3.2 km), the qualifying system was a multi-car system that included three rounds. The first round was 15 minutes, where every driver would be able to set a lap within the 15 minutes. Then, the second round would consist of the fastest 24 cars in Round 1, and drivers would have 10 minutes to set a lap. Round 3 consisted of the fastest 12 drivers from Round 2, and the drivers would have 5 minutes to set a time. Whoever was fastest in Round 3 would win the pole.

Cole Custer of Stewart-Haas Racing with Biagi-DenBeste would win the pole after making through both preliminary rounds and setting a time of 22.253 and an average speed of 121.332 miles per hour (195.265 km/h) in the third round.

No drivers would fail to qualify.

=== Full practice results ===
Pos.	#	Driver	Team	Make	Time (R1)	Speed (R1)	Time (R2)	Speed (R2)	Time (R3)	Speed (R3)
1	00	Cole Custer	Stewart-Haas Racing with Biagi-DenBeste	Ford	22.959	117.601	22.524	119.872	22.253	121.332
2	20	Christopher Bell	Joe Gibbs Racing	Toyota	22.762	118.619	22.541	119.782	22.336	120.881
3	22	Austin Cindric	Team Penske	Ford	22.707	118.906	22.562	119.670	22.453	120.251
4	21	Daniel Hemric	Richard Childress Racing	Chevrolet	22.806	118.390	22.506	119.968	22.460	120.214
5	42	John Hunter Nemechek	Chip Ganassi Racing	Chevrolet	22.340	120.859	22.615	119.390	22.464	120.192
6	11	Ryan Truex	Kaulig Racing	Chevrolet	22.954	117.627	22.468	120.171	22.550	119.734
7	7	Justin Allgaier	JR Motorsports	Chevrolet	22.647	119.221	22.466	120.182	22.558	119.691
8	1	Elliott Sadler	JR Motorsports	Chevrolet	22.734	118.765	22.631	119.305	22.570	119.628
9	5	Michael Annett	JR Motorsports	Chevrolet	22.770	118.577	22.626	119.332	22.570	119.628
10	9	Tyler Reddick	JR Motorsports	Chevrolet	22.758	118.640	22.611	119.411	22.586	119.543
11	18	Noah Gragson	Joe Gibbs Racing	Toyota	23.000	117.391	22.487	120.069	22.613	119.400
12	2	Matt Tifft	Richard Childress Racing	Chevrolet	22.900	117.904	22.534	119.819	22.685	119.021
Eliminated in Round 2
13	16	Ryan Reed	Roush Fenway Racing	Ford	22.638	119.268	22.656	119.174	—	—
14	3	Jeb Burton	Richard Childress Racing	Chevrolet	22.854	118.141	22.685	119.021	—	—
15	60	Chase Briscoe	Roush Fenway Racing	Ford	22.838	118.224	22.693	118.979	—	—
16	4	Ross Chastain	JD Motorsports	Chevrolet	22.789	118.478	22.734	118.765	—	—
17	23	Spencer Gallagher	GMS Racing	Chevrolet	22.824	118.297	22.788	118.483	—	—
18	19	Brandon Jones	Joe Gibbs Racing	Toyota	22.905	117.878	22.796	118.442	—	—
19	36	Alex Labbé	DGM Racing	Chevrolet	22.922	117.791	22.855	118.136	—	—
20	15	Joe Nemechek	JD Motorsports	Chevrolet	22.996	117.412	22.884	117.986	—	—
21	90	Brandon Brown	Brandonbilt Motorsports	Chevrolet	22.991	117.437	22.958	117.606	—	—
22	24	Kaz Grala	JGL Racing	Ford	22.888	117.966	22.959	117.601	—	—
23	35	Joey Gase	Go Green Racing with SS-Green Light Racing	Chevrolet	22.809	118.374	22.992	117.432	—	—
24	39	Ryan Sieg	RSS Racing	Chevrolet	22.915	117.827	23.016	117.310	—	—
Eliminated in Round 1
25	52	David Starr	Jimmy Means Racing	Chevrolet	23.038	117.198	—	—	—	—
26	51	Jeremy Clements	Jeremy Clements Racing	Chevrolet	23.056	117.106	—	—	—	—
27	38	J. J. Yeley	RSS Racing	Chevrolet	23.056	117.106	—	—	—	—
28	0	Garrett Smithley	JD Motorsports	Chevrolet	23.136	116.701	—	—	—	—
29	55	Stephen Leicht	JP Motorsports	Toyota	23.144	116.661	—	—	—	—
30	8	Tommy Joe Martins	B. J. McLeod Motorsports	Chevrolet	23.208	116.339	—	—	—	—
31	89	Morgan Shepherd	Shepherd Racing Ventures	Chevrolet	23.251	116.124	—	—	—	—
32	93	Jeff Green	RSS Racing	Chevrolet	23.300	115.880	—	—	—	—
33	40	Chad Finchum	MBM Motorsports	Toyota	23.353	115.617	—	—	—	—
Qualified by owner's points
34	76	Spencer Boyd	SS-Green Light Racing	Chevrolet	23.373	115.518	—	—	—	—
35	28	Tony Mrakovich	JGL Racing	Ford	23.404	115.365	—	—	—	—
36	78	B. J. McLeod	B. J. McLeod Motorsports	Chevrolet	23.417	115.301	—	—	—	—
37	45	Josh Bilicki	JP Motorsports	Toyota	23.550	114.650	—	—	—	—
38	01	Vinnie Miller	JD Motorsports	Chevrolet	23.559	114.606	—	—	—	—
39	66	Timmy Hill	MBM Motorsports	Dodge	23.617	114.324	—	—	—	—
40	74	Mike Harmon	Mike Harmon Racing	Dodge	24.111	111.982	—	—	—	—
Official qualifying results
Official starting lineup

== Race results ==
Stage 1 Laps: 75

Pos.	#	Driver	Team	Make	Pts
1	21	Daniel Hemric	Richard Childress Racing	Chevrolet	10
2	20	Christopher Bell	Joe Gibbs Racing	Toyota	9
3	00	Cole Custer	Stewart-Haas Racing with Biagi-DenBeste	Ford	8
4	3	Jeb Burton	Richard Childress Racing	Chevrolet	7
5	1	Elliott Sadler	JR Motorsports	Chevrolet	6
6	2	Matt Tifft	Richard Childress Racing	Chevrolet	5
7	9	Tyler Reddick	JR Motorsports	Chevrolet	4
8	19	Brandon Jones	Joe Gibbs Racing	Toyota	3
9	42	John Hunter Nemechek	Chip Ganassi Racing	Chevrolet	2
10	22	Austin Cindric	Team Penske	Ford	1

Stage 2 Laps: 75

Pos.	#	Driver	Team	Make	Pts
1	1	Elliott Sadler	JR Motorsports	Chevrolet	10
2	18	Noah Gragson	Joe Gibbs Racing	Toyota	0
3	2	Matt Tifft	Richard Childress Racing	Chevrolet	8
4	20	Christopher Bell	Joe Gibbs Racing	Toyota	7
5	00	Cole Custer	Stewart-Haas Racing with Biagi-DenBeste	Ford	6
6	42	John Hunter Nemechek	Chip Ganassi Racing	Chevrolet	5
7	19	Brandon Jones	Joe Gibbs Racing	Toyota	4
8	9	Tyler Reddick	JR Motorsports	Chevrolet	3
9	22	Austin Cindric	Team Penske	Ford	2
10	11	Ryan Truex	Kaulig Racing	Chevrolet	1

Stage 3 Laps: 100

Fin	St	#	Driver	Team	Make	Laps	Led	Status	Pts
1	2	20	Christopher Bell	Joe Gibbs Racing	Toyota	250	120	running	56
2	11	18	Noah Gragson	Joe Gibbs Racing	Toyota	250	10	running	0
3	8	1	Elliott Sadler	JR Motorsports	Chevrolet	250	30	running	50
4	12	2	Matt Tifft	Richard Childress Racing	Chevrolet	250	0	running	46
5	3	22	Austin Cindric	Team Penske	Ford	250	0	running	35
6	1	00	Cole Custer	Stewart-Haas Racing with Biagi-DenBeste	Ford	250	43	running	45
7	6	11	Ryan Truex	Kaulig Racing	Chevrolet	250	0	running	31
8	26	51	Jeremy Clements	Jeremy Clements Racing	Chevrolet	250	0	running	29
9	13	16	Ryan Reed	Roush Fenway Racing	Ford	250	0	running	28
10	18	19	Brandon Jones	Joe Gibbs Racing	Toyota	250	0	running	34
11	10	9	Tyler Reddick	JR Motorsports	Chevrolet	250	0	running	33
12	14	3	Jeb Burton	Richard Childress Racing	Chevrolet	250	0	running	32
13	5	42	John Hunter Nemechek	Chip Ganassi Racing	Chevrolet	250	36	running	31
14	7	7	Justin Allgaier	JR Motorsports	Chevrolet	250	0	running	23
15	27	38	J. J. Yeley	RSS Racing	Chevrolet	249	0	running	22
16	19	36	Alex Labbé	DGM Racing	Chevrolet	249	0	running	21
17	17	23	Spencer Gallagher	GMS Racing	Chevrolet	249	0	running	20
18	16	4	Ross Chastain	JD Motorsports	Chevrolet	249	0	running	19
19	21	90	Brandon Brown	Brandonbilt Motorsports	Chevrolet	249	0	running	18
20	9	5	Michael Annett	JR Motorsports	Chevrolet	249	0	running	17
21	24	39	Ryan Sieg	RSS Racing	Chevrolet	249	0	running	16
22	23	35	Joey Gase	Go Green Racing with SS-Green Light Racing	Chevrolet	248	0	running	15
23	30	8	Tommy Joe Martins	B. J. McLeod Motorsports	Chevrolet	247	0	running	14
24	35	28	Tony Mrakovich	JGL Racing	Ford	247	0	running	13
25	20	15	Joe Nemechek	JD Motorsports	Chevrolet	247	0	running	0
26	15	60	Chase Briscoe	Roush Fenway Racing	Ford	246	0	running	11
27	28	0	Garrett Smithley	JD Motorsports	Chevrolet	246	0	running	10
28	34	76	Spencer Boyd	SS-Green Light Racing	Chevrolet	246	0	running	9
29	4	21	Daniel Hemric	Richard Childress Racing	Chevrolet	246	11	running	18
30	22	24	Kaz Grala	JGL Racing	Ford	245	0	running	7
31	38	01	Vinnie Miller	JD Motorsports	Chevrolet	244	0	running	6
32	36	78	B. J. McLeod	B. J. McLeod Motorsports	Chevrolet	244	0	running	5
33	37	45	Josh Bilicki	JP Motorsports	Toyota	244	0	running	4
34	33	40	Chad Finchum	MBM Motorsports	Toyota	238	0	running	3
35	25	52	David Starr	Jimmy Means Racing	Chevrolet	229	0	running	2
36	40	74	Mike Harmon	Mike Harmon Racing	Dodge	133	0	clutch	1
37	29	55	Stephen Leicht	JP Motorsports	Toyota	128	0	brakes	1
38	39	66	Timmy Hill	MBM Motorsports	Dodge	107	0	fuel pump	1
39	31	89	Morgan Shepherd	Shepherd Racing Ventures	Chevrolet	32	0	brakes	1
40	32	93	Jeff Green	RSS Racing	Chevrolet	26	0	electrical	1
Official race results

Previous race: 2018 Fitzgerald Glider Kits 300	NASCAR Xfinity Series; 2018 season	Next race: 2018 Sparks Energy 300
