= Tony Mrakovich =

American racing driver (born 1999)

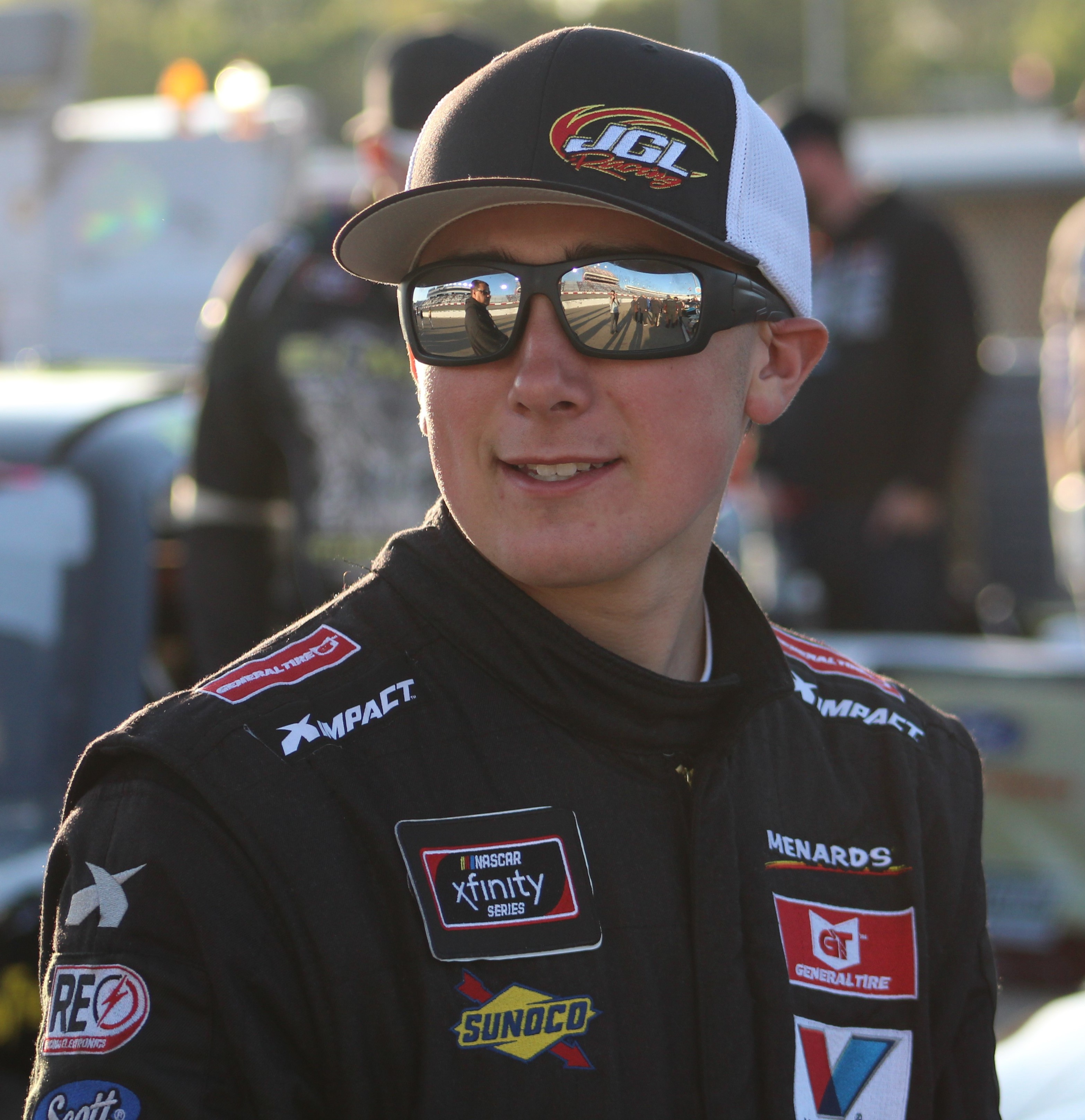
- Born: Anthony S. Mrakovich; January 5, 1999 (age 27); Elizabethtown, Pennsylvania, U.S.

NASCAR O'Reilly Auto Parts Series career
- 1 race run over 1 year
- Best finish: 69th (2018)
- First race: 2018 ToyotaCare 250 (Richmond)
Wins	Top tens	Poles
0	0	0

NASCAR FedEx Freight Truck Series career
- 3 races run over 1 year
- Best finish: 45th (2019)
- First race: 2019 SpeedyCash.com 400 (Texas)
- Last race: 2019 World of Westgate 200 (Las Vegas)
Wins	Top tens	Poles
0	0	0

ARCA Menards Series career
- 6 races run over 2 years
- Best finish: 40th (2017)
- First race: 2017 Music City 200 (Nashville)
- Last race: 2018 General Tire #AnywhereIsPossible 200 (Pocono)
Wins	Top tens	Poles
0	2	0
- Statistics up to date as of November 18, 2019.

Anthony S. Mrakovich (born January 5, 1999) is an American former professional stock car racing driver. He last competed in the NASCAR Gander Outdoors Truck Series, driving for Tony Mrakovich Racing. He previously competed part-time in the NASCAR Xfinity Series, driving the No. 28 Ford Mustang for JGL Racing.

== Racing career ==
=== Xfinity Series ===
Mrakovich made his Xfinity debut at Richmond in April 2018, driving the No. 28 Ford Mustang part-time for JGL Racing. He had previously supposed to debut at Bristol, but was replaced by Dylan Lupton after disappointing practices. Mrakovich finished 24th in his first Xfinity race after starting 35th.

=== Gander Outdoors Truck Series ===
On January 2, 2019, Mrakovich announced he will compete part-time in the NASCAR Gander Outdoors Truck Series under his team Tony Mrakovich Racing. He intended to debut at the first Martinsville race, but failed to qualify. He did qualify for the SpeedyCash.com 400 finishing 26th. Mrakovich also withdrew at Dover under his team Tony Mrakovich Racing. He drove to finishes of twelfth and thirteenth at Pocono and Las Vegas for NEMCO Motorsports.

== Motorsports career results ==
=== NASCAR ===
(key) (Bold – Pole position awarded by qualifying time. Italics – Pole position earned by points standings or practice time. * – Most laps led.)

==== Xfinity Series ====
NASCAR Xfinity Series results
Year	Team	No.	Make	1	2	3	4	5	6	7	8	9	10	11	12	13	14	15	16	17	18	19	20	21	22	23	24	25	26	27	28	29	30	31	32	33	NXSC	Pts	Ref
2018	JGL Racing	28	Ford	DAY	ATL	LVS	PHO	CAL	TEX	BRI; DC^{†}	RCH; 24	TAL	DOV	CLT	POC	MCH	IOW	CHI	DAY	KEN	NHA	IOW	GLN	MOH	BRI	ROA	DAR	IND	LVS	RCH	CLT	DOV	KAN	TEX	PHO	HOM	69th	13	
^{†} – Replaced by Dylan Lupton.

==== Gander Outdoors Truck Series ====
NASCAR Gander Outdoors Truck Series results
Year	Team	No.	Make	1	2	3	4	5	6	7	8	9	10	11	12	13	14	15	16	17	18	19	20	21	22	23	NGOTC	Pts	Ref
2019	Tony Mrakovich Racing	43	Chevy	DAY	ATL	LVS	MAR; DNQ	TEX	DOV	KAN	CLT																45th	60	
2019	NEMCO Motorsports	8	Chevy									TEX; 26	IOW	GTW	CHI	KEN	POC; 12	ELD	MCH	BRI	MSP						45th	60	
2019	NEMCO Motorsports	87	Chevy																			LVS; 13	TAL	MAR	PHO	HOM	45th	60	

=== ARCA Racing Series ===
(key) (Bold – Pole position awarded by qualifying time. Italics – Pole position earned by points standings or practice time. * – Most laps led.)

ARCA Racing Series results
Year	Team	No.	Make	1	2	3	4	5	6	7	8	9	10	11	12	13	14	15	16	17	18	19	20	ARSC	Pts	Ref
2017	Ken Schrader Racing	11	Toyota	DAY	NSH; 8																			40th	530	
2017	Ken Schrader Racing	10	Toyota			SLM; 9	TAL	TOL	ELK															40th	530	
2017	Fast Track Racing	10	Toyota							POC; 15	MCH	MAD	IOW	IRP	POC	WIN	ISF	ROA	DSF	SLM	CHI	KEN	KAN	40th	530	
2018	Fast Track Racing	10	Chevy	DAY; 29	NSH	SLM	TAL																	59th	375	
2018	Fast Track Racing	10	Toyota					TOL; 13	CLT															59th	375	
2018	Fast Track Racing	11	Chevy							POC; 21	MCH	MAD	GTW	CHI	IOW	ELK	POC	ISF	BLN	DSF	SLM	IRP	KAN	59th	375	

^{*} Season still in progress
^{1} Ineligible for series points
