= Cody McMahan =

American racing driver

- Born: Cody T. McMahan; December 7, 1991 (age 34); Chilhowie, Virginia, U.S.

NASCAR FedEx Freight Truck Series career
- 2 races run over 1 year
- 2019 position: 82nd
- Best finish: 82nd (2019)
- First race: 2019 CarShield 200 (Gateway)
- Last race: 2019 NASCAR Hall of Fame 200 (Martinsville)
Wins	Top tens	Poles
0	0	0
- Statistics up to date as of November 18, 2019.

Cody T. McMahan (born December 7, 1991) is an American professional stock car racing driver. He last competed part-time in the NASCAR Gander Outdoors Truck Series, driving the No. 1 Chevrolet Silverado for Beaver Motorsports and the No. 0 Silverado for JJC Racing.

== Racing career ==
McMahan's interest in racing began when he attended his first race at the age of four; as a 12-year-old, he began dirt track racing at Wythe Raceway. In 2011, he competed in the Charger division at Lonesome Pine Raceway with NASCAR veteran Eric McClure as his manager. That year, he won four races and Rookie of the Year honors. He eventually moved to the X-1R Pro Cup Series before making his ARCA Racing Series debut at Talladega Superspeedway in 2013, where he finished 12th.

In 2016, McMahan joined JJC Racing for the NASCAR Camping World Truck Series race at Bristol Motor Speedway, but failed to qualify. Three years later, he successfully made the CarShield 200 at World Wide Technology Raceway at Gateway with Beaver Motorsports. After starting 31st, he finished 29th after retiring from the race on lap 32 with damage. A start in the NASCAR Hall of Fame 200 at Martinsville Speedway with JJC ended with his truck's engine failing before he could complete a lap.

== Personal life ==
McMahan attended Chilhowie High School, where he played quarterback for the high school football team. His grandfather Ken McMahan raced at Wythe Raceway from 1972 to 2004, where he won multiple track championships.

== Motorsports career results ==
=== NASCAR ===
(key) (Bold – Pole position awarded by qualifying time. Italics – Pole position earned by points standings or practice time. * – Most laps led.)

==== Gander Outdoors Truck Series ====
NASCAR Gander Outdoors Truck Series results
Year	Team	No.	Make	1	2	3	4	5	6	7	8	9	10	11	12	13	14	15	16	17	18	19	20	21	22	23	NGOTC	Pts	Ref
2016	JJC Racing	10	Chevy	DAY	ATL	MAR	KAN	DOV	CLT	TEX	IOW	GTW	KEN	ELD	POC	BRI; DNQ	MCH	MSP	CHI	NHA	LVS	TAL	MAR	TEX	PHO	HOM	NA	-	
2019	Beaver Motorsports	1	Chevy	DAY	ATL	LVS	MAR	TEX	DOV	KAN	CLT	TEX	IOW	GTW; 29	CHI	KEN	POC	ELD	MCH	BRI	MSP	LVS	TAL				82nd	13	
2019	JJC Racing	0	Chevy																					MAR; 32	PHO	HOM	82nd	13	

=== ARCA Racing Series ===
(key) (Bold – Pole position awarded by qualifying time. Italics – Pole position earned by points standings or practice time. * – Most laps led.)

ARCA Racing Series results
Year	Team	No.	Make	1	2	3	4	5	6	7	8	9	10	11	12	13	14	15	16	17	18	19	20	21	ARSC	Pts	Ref
2013	Wes Gonder Racing	10	Ford	DAY	MOB	SLM	TAL; 12	TOL	ELK	POC	MCH	ROA	WIN	CHI	NJE	POC	BLN	ISF	MAD	DSF	IOW	SLM	KEN	KAN	108th	170	

^{*} Season still in progress
^{1} Ineligible for series points
