= Brett Moffitt =

American racing driver (born 1992)

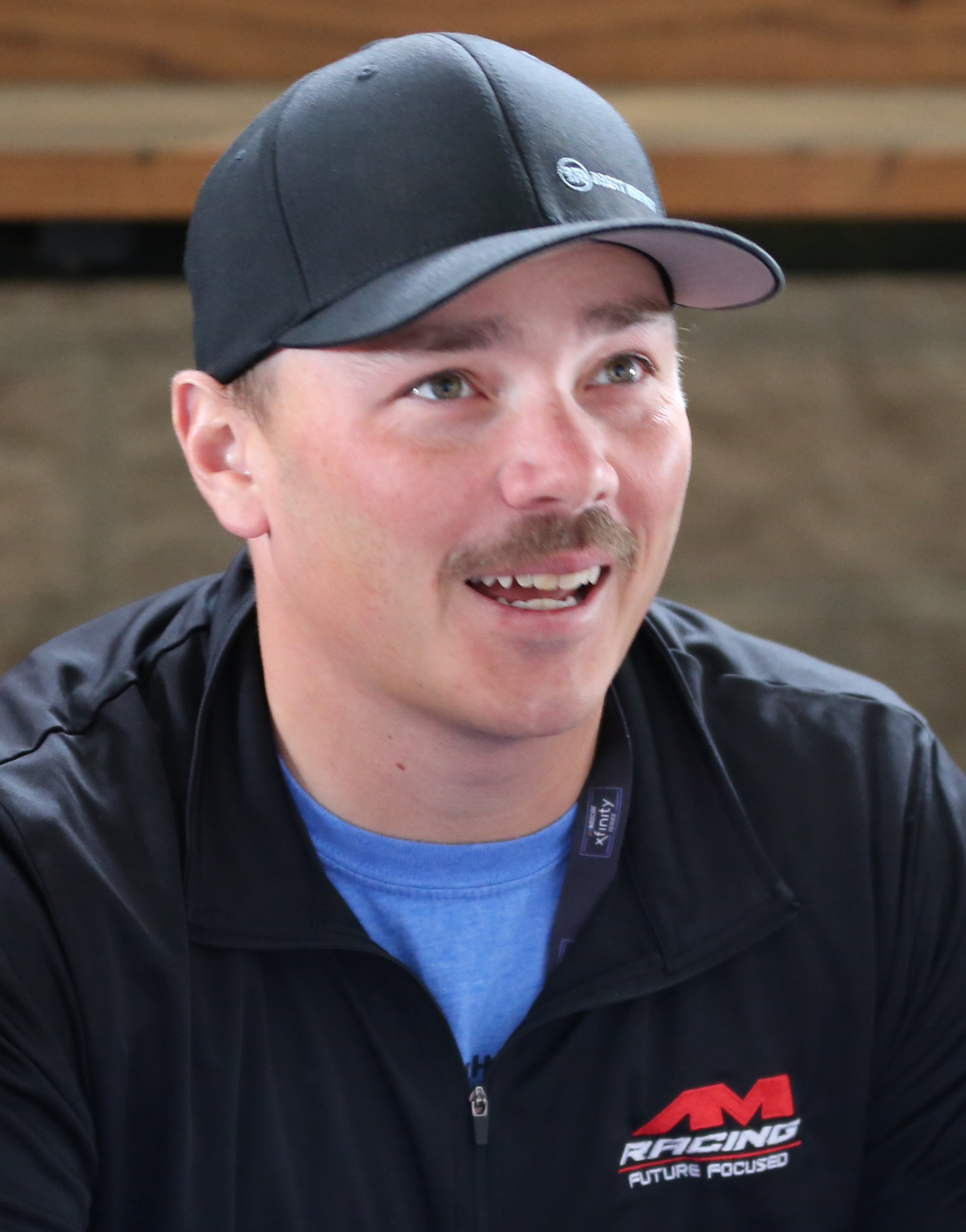
- Moffitt at Sonoma Raceway in 2023
- Born: Brett Bradley Moffitt; August 7, 1992 (age 34); Grimes, Iowa, U.S.
- Height: 5 ft 9 in (1.75 m)
- Weight: 177 lb (80 kg)
- Achievements: 2018 NASCAR Camping World Truck Series Champion; 2007 Harris Clash Sportsman Modified Winner
- Awards: 2015 NASCAR Sprint Cup Series Rookie of the Year; 2008 ASA Late Model Series Northern Division Rookie of the Year

NASCAR Cup Series career
- 45 races run over 3 years
- 2017 position: 61st
- Best finish: 34th (2015)
- First race: 2014 FedEx 400 (Dover)
- Last race: 2017 Hollywood Casino 400 (Kansas)
Wins	Top tens	Poles
0	1	0

NASCAR O'Reilly Auto Parts Series career
- 118 races run over 8 years
- 2024 position: 98th
- Best finish: 15th (2023)
- First race: 2012 U.S. Cellular 250 (Iowa)
- Last race: 2024 Hy-Vee PERKS 250 (Iowa)
Wins	Top tens	Poles
0	32	0

NASCAR FedEx Freight Truck Series career
- 97 races run over 10 years
- 2024 position: 35th
- Best finish: 1st (2018)
- First race: 2013 UNOH 225 (Kentucky)
- Last race: 2024 NASCAR Craftsman Truck Series Championship Race (Phoenix)
- First win: 2016 Careers for Veterans 200 (Michigan)
- Last win: 2023 Love's RV Stop 250 (Talladega)
Wins	Top tens	Poles
13	55	3

ARCA Menards Series career
- 1 race run over 1 year
- Best finish: 68th (2009)
- First race: 2009 Rockingham ARCA 200 (Rockingham)
Wins	Top tens	Poles
0	1	0

ARCA Menards Series East career
- 62 races run over 6 years
- Best finish: 2nd (2010, 2013)
- First race: 2009 NASCAR Home Tracks 150 presented by Kevin Whitaker Chevrolet (Greenville-Pickens)
- Last race: 2018 Great Outdoors RV Superstore 100 (Watkins Glen)
- First win: 2009 South Boston 150 (South Boston)
- Last win: 2018 Great Outdoors RV Superstore 100 (Watkins Glen)
Wins	Top tens	Poles
10	45	10

ARCA Menards Series West career
- 2 races run over 2 years
- Best finish: 49th (2009)
- First race: 2009 Central IA Building & Construction Trades 125 (Iowa)
- Last race: 2010 Jimmie Johnson Foundation 150 (Phoenix)
Wins	Top tens	Poles
0	1	0
- Statistics up to date as of November 8, 2024.

Brett Bradley Moffitt (born August 7, 1992) is an American professional stock car racing driver. He last competed part-time in the NASCAR Craftsman Truck Series, driving the No. 1 Toyota Tundra TRD Pro for Tricon Garage and the No. 4 Chevrolet Silverado RST for Hettinger Racing and part-time in the NASCAR Xfinity Series, driving the No. 19 Toyota GR Supra for Joe Gibbs Racing.

Moffitt won Rookie of the Year Honors in 2015 in the NASCAR Cup Series and won the 2018 NASCAR Camping World Truck Series Championship.

== Racing career ==
=== Early years ===
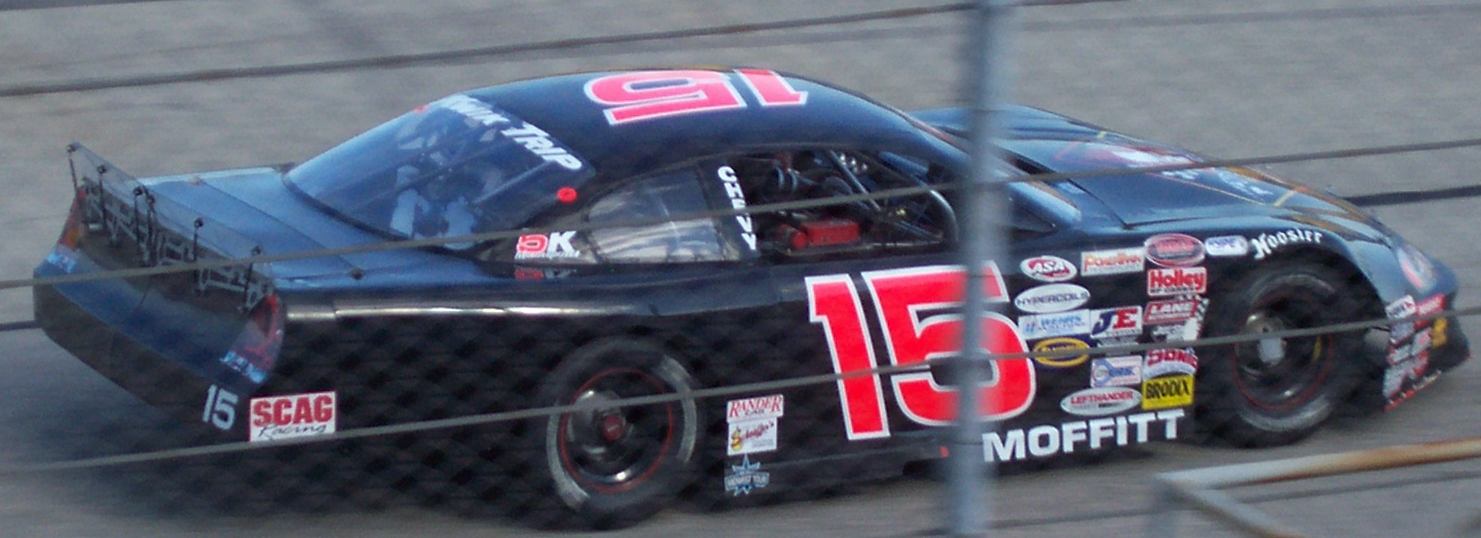
2008 ASALMS car

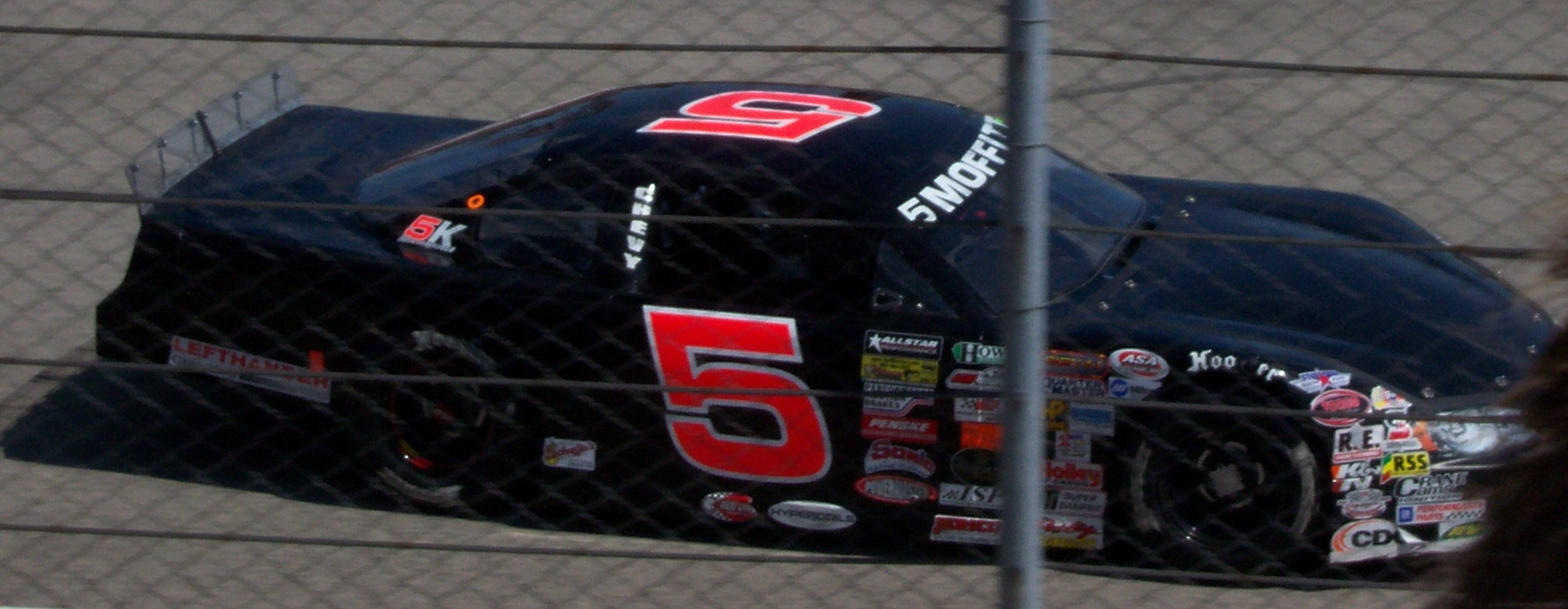
2008 ASA Late Model at the Milwaukee Mile

Moffitt began his racing career at the age of ten in kart racing competition. In 2007, Moffitt won the Harris Clash in the IMCA Sport Modified division. Following several years of competition in karts and dirt track racing, Moffitt began competing on asphalt in 2008, driving in the American Speed Association's Late Model North Series. He made his debut in NASCAR touring series competition in 2009, driving in the K&N Pro Series East – then known as the Camping World East Series – for a team owned by Andy Santerre; winning the pole in his first race at Greenville-Pickens Speedway, he became the youngest driver ever to do so in the series. He went on to score two wins over the course of the season, finishing the year third in series points. His first win, in the fourth race of the season at South Boston Speedway in May, made Moffitt the youngest driver ever to win in the series, and the youngest to win in any NASCAR touring series; the mark stood until the following season, when it was eclipsed by Bubba Wallace in March 2010.

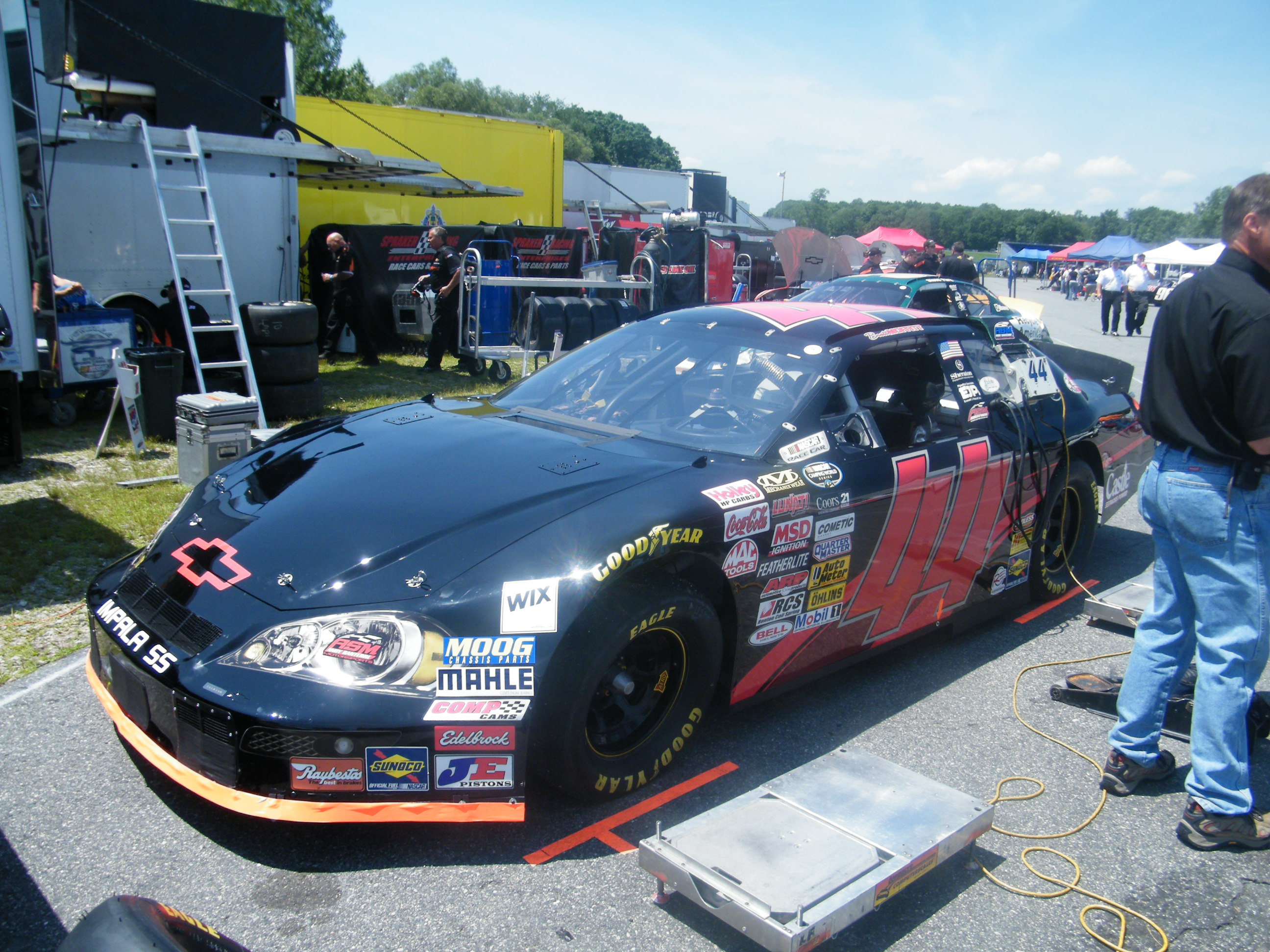
Moffitt's 2009 East Series car

=== Toyota development ===
For the 2010 season, Moffitt moved to Joe Gibbs Racing; he scored two wins during the year on his way to finishing second in points at the end of the season. In 2011, he drove as a development driver for Michael Waltrip Racing, winning three times throughout the K&N Pro Series East season and finishing third in the series standings.

For 2012, Moffitt changed teams again, moving to Hattori Racing Enterprises, owned by former IndyCar and Truck Series driver Shigeaki Hattori. He won races at Richmond International Raceway and Central Pennsylvania Speedway, and led the series points after nine events of the fourteen-race season. A lack of sponsorship funding from HRE meant that for the final races of the season, starting at New Hampshire, the team associated with Michael Waltrip Racing to field Moffitt's car. He nearly won the 2012 K&N Pro Series East Championship, and was leading the final lap of the race and made contact with eventual winner Tyler Reddick, Moffitt crashed and lost the championship to Kyle Larson.

In August 2012, Moffitt made his debut in the NASCAR Nationwide Series, driving for RAB Racing at Iowa Speedway in the U.S. Cellular 250. He finished ninth in the event.

In 2013, Moffitt again drove the K&N Pro Series East with Hattori Racing Enterprises. Moffit scored five top-five finishes and ten top-tens in fourteen races and finished the season runner-up in championship points.

Moffit was employed as a test driver for Michael Waltrip Racing. He made his Sprint Cup Series debut with the MWR-affiliated Identity Ventures Racing in the FedEx 400. Moffitt ran for IVR again at Michigan, Indianapolis, Bristol, Atlanta, Charlotte, Texas, and the season finale at Homestead.

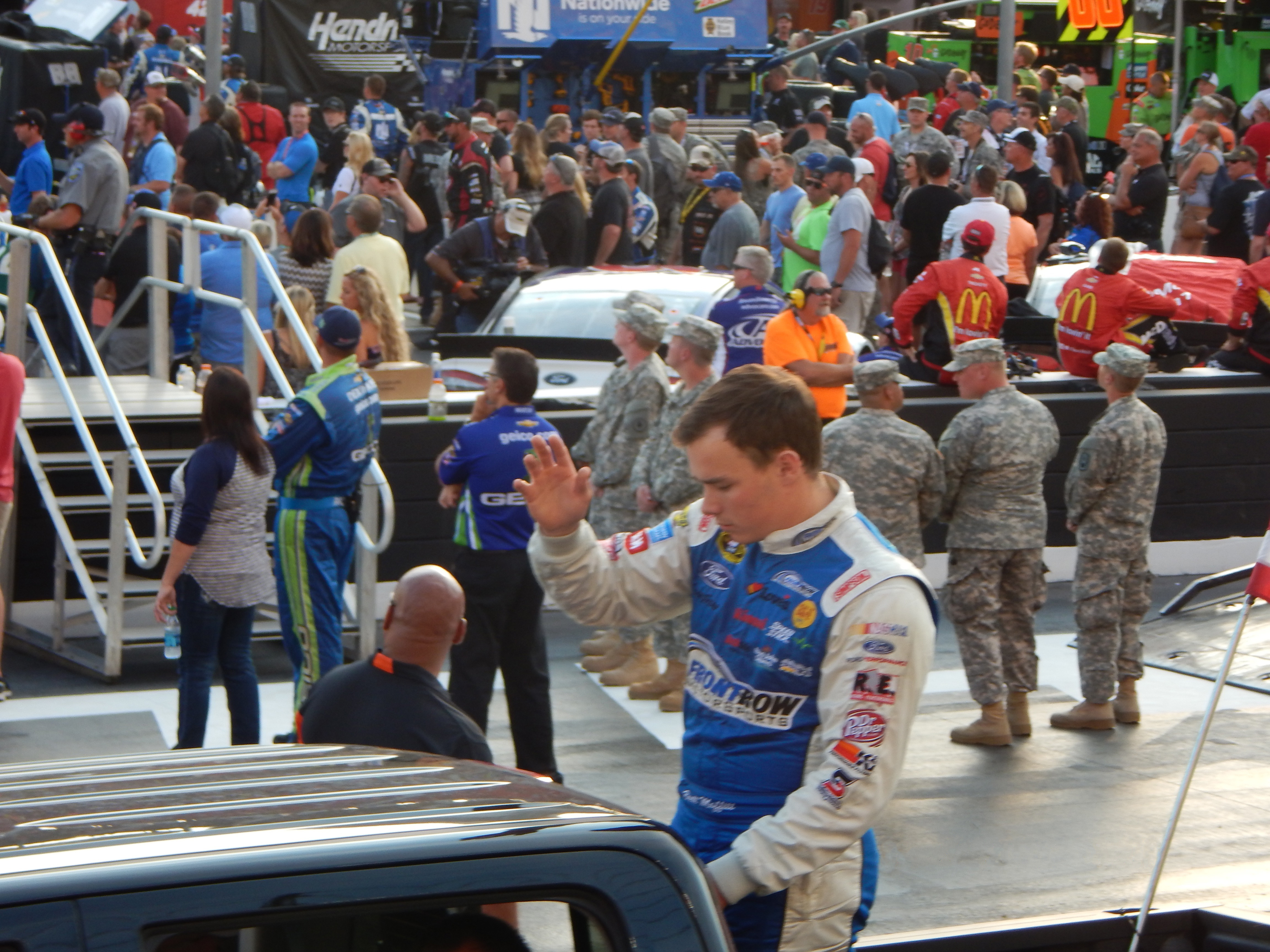
Moffitt at the 2015 Irwin Tools Night Race

In 2015, Moffitt drove in the No. 55 at Atlanta because MWR's regular driver, Brian Vickers, had off-season surgery to repair a patch placed over a hole in his heart. Moffitt played an impressive race, leading one lap, spending some time up in the top ten, and ultimately finished eighth for his first-ever Sprint Cup top-ten. Moffitt returned to the No. 55 at Fontana due to Vickers being sidelined with more blood clots, also declaring for Rookie of the Year at this time. He returned to the 55 at Martinsville and Texas.

Moffitt drove the No. 34 for Front Row Motorsports at Las Vegas and Phoenix because their regular driver David Ragan drove for Joe Gibbs Racing while JGR driver Kyle Busch was injured. It was announced that Moffitt will again replace Vickers for the next five races as he takes blood thinner medication and cannot race while using it. Moffitt was then replaced by Michael Waltrip for the Talladega race. Ragan became the driver of the 55 at the Kansas race after Erik Jones took over the 18 ride. Later in the week, Front Row Motorsports announced that Moffitt would return to the team at Kansas and become the primary driver of the 34 for the rest of the 2015 season, except at Sonoma, Watkins Glen, and Talladega.

Moffitt ended up running 31 races and won the 2015 NASCAR Cup Series Rookie of the Year honors over contenders Jeb Burton, Matt DiBenedetto, and Alex Kennedy.

On December 10, 2015, it was learned that Moffitt would not return to the No. 34 Ford Fusion in 2016, being replaced by 2015 NASCAR Xfinity Series champion Chris Buescher for the 2016 season.

=== 2016–present ===
In 2016, Moffitt was picked up by Red Horse Racing to race at Kentucky in the No. 11 Toyota Tundra. He started 2nd and finished 31st after blowing an engine. Moffitt returned to the truck for Pocono and Bristol and finished third and second, respectively. On August 27, Moffitt won at Michigan in his fourth start in the No. 11 (and sixth career start) after passing both William Byron and Red Horse Racing teammate Timothy Peters on the final lap of the Career For Veterans 200. Moffitt also made a fifth start in the No. 11 at Canadian Tire Motorsport Park, finishing 16th. Matt Tifft, the driver Moffitt was substituting for, returned to the 11 at Chicagoland Speedway after recovering from brain surgery earlier that year.

On February 17, 2017, it was announced that Moffitt would drive the first two races for Red Horse in 2017, behind the wheel of the No. 7. Moffitt was looking to run the full schedule, but on May 22, team owner Tom DeLoach announced the closure of Red Horse until sponsorship can be found, leaving Moffitt and teammate Timothy Peters without rides; at the time of the team's shutdown, Moffitt was tenth in points. In July, Moffitt joined GMS Racing's No. 96 team for his Xfinity Series return at Iowa Speedway. A month later, he signed with BK Racing to run the Cup races at Watkins Glen and Michigan in the team's No. 83 Camry. In September, Moffitt and BK formed an agreement for him to race for the team through the remainder of the season.

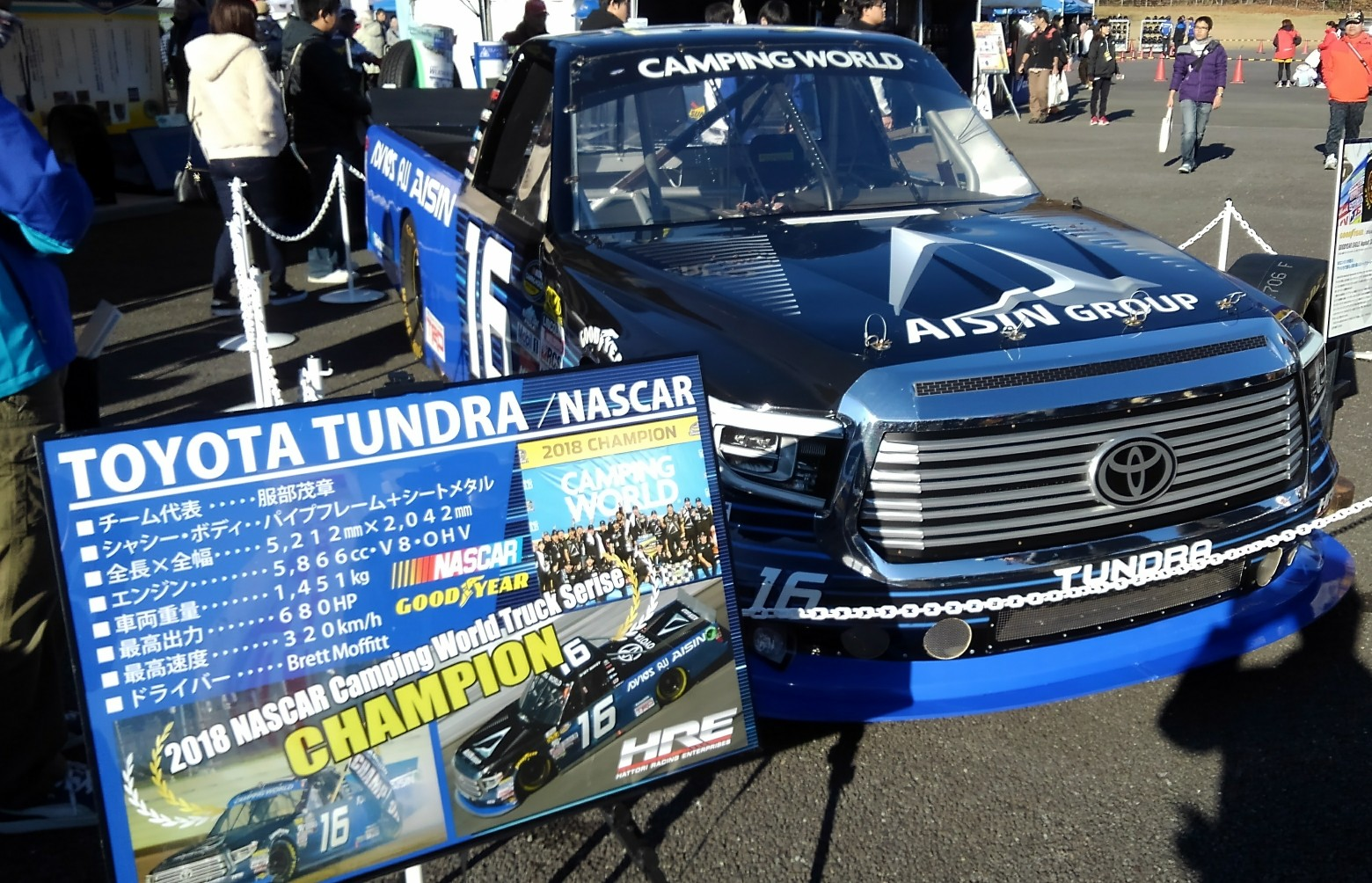
Moffitt's championship winning truck on display in Japan.

In 2018, it was announced that Moffitt would be driving the No. 16 truck full-time for Hattori Racing Enterprises. In the second race of the season at Atlanta, a caution came out to set up an overtime restart. After pit stops, Moffitt lined up third behind new race leader Myatt Snider. On the restart, Moffitt went three-wide into turn one and took the lead. Moffitt ended up pulling away to get the win, in a move reminiscent of the one he made to get his first Truck Series win in the 2016 Michigan race. Another win came in early summer at Iowa, where Moffitt outdueled Noah Gragson. The win solidified Moffitt's playoff positioning, which had been in danger when the team almost didn't go to Texas earlier in the season (NASCAR rules mandate a driver starts all races to be eligible for the playoffs); concerns about the team missing the Chicagoland race in late June were also raised, which would have forfeited his playoff eligibility. However, FR8Auctions.com announced it would sponsor him at Chicagoland and Kentucky. At Chicagoland, John Hunter Nemechek ran out of fuel on the last lap, allowing Moffitt to win his third race of the season. At Michigan, Moffitt fought in the closing laps for the lead with Johnny Sauter, before being able to make a last-lap pass coming off the final turns to eek past Sauter for his fourth win of the season. Moffitt made another late-race pass on a restart at Phoenix to win his fifth race of the season and lock himself into the Championship 4 at Homestead–Miami Speedway. He would then win the next week at Homestead, winning his first championship in the process.

On December 6, 2018, Moffitt was released by Hattori Racing Enterprises since the team needed to secure a driver who could bring funding for the 2019 season. On January 10, 2019, it was announced that Moffitt would replace Johnny Sauter as the driver of the GMS Racing No. 24 Chevrolet. The deal started when GMS president Mike Beam contacted Moffitt around the 2018 winter holidays; Moffitt previously had lower-tier offers on the table from teams who hoped to replicate the elevation in success that Moffitt brought HRE in 2018.

Despite not leading a lap and finishing second in June's M&M's 200 at Iowa, Moffitt was declared the winner after unofficial winner Ross Chastain's truck failed post-race inspection, thus making Moffitt the declared winner. Moffitt became the first winner to achieve a win like this in any of the top-three series since Dale Jarrett was disqualified from a Busch Series victory in 1995. Moffitt also became the first race winner in any NASCAR series to achieve a victory in this way since NASCAR Euro Series driver Lucas Lasserre was awarded the victory at the second Elite 1 race at Franciacorta in 2018 after initial race winner Alon Day was disqualified for failing post-race inspection. Moffitt scored the first playoff win at Bristol. He then scored off a very dominant victory at Canadian Tire Motorsport Park in Canada, in which he led all but 19 laps of the race, holding off Alex Tagliani for the win. He qualified for the Truck Series Championship Round, where he finished third.

In 2020, Moffitt joined Our Motorsports for what was intended to be a four-race Xfinity schedule, but he eventually drove full-time except Bristol, which Patrick Emerling drove, Homestead R2, where he was scheduled to drive but replaced by Jairo Avila Jr., and Road America and Daytona RC, which were run by road course ringer Andy Lally. In the Truck Series, Moffitt did not win a race until the playoff event at Kansas, where he held off GMS Racing teammate Zane Smith to clinch a spot in the final round. Moffitt led much of the championship race at Phoenix, but elected to stay out after a caution with two laps remaining, resulting in him falling back on the final restart as he finished tenth and third in the standings.

Moffitt left GMS after 2020 and joined Niece Motorsports for the 2021 Truck Series season. He also returned to Our and the Xfinity Series on a full-time basis in 2021, though he declared for Truck points. On April 22, with him being fifteenth in the Truck standings while seeing improvements at Our, Moffitt switched to Xfinity points. Despite the switch, he joined AM Racing for the Truck race at Knoxville in July, finishing 38th after flipping onto his side down the frontstretch.

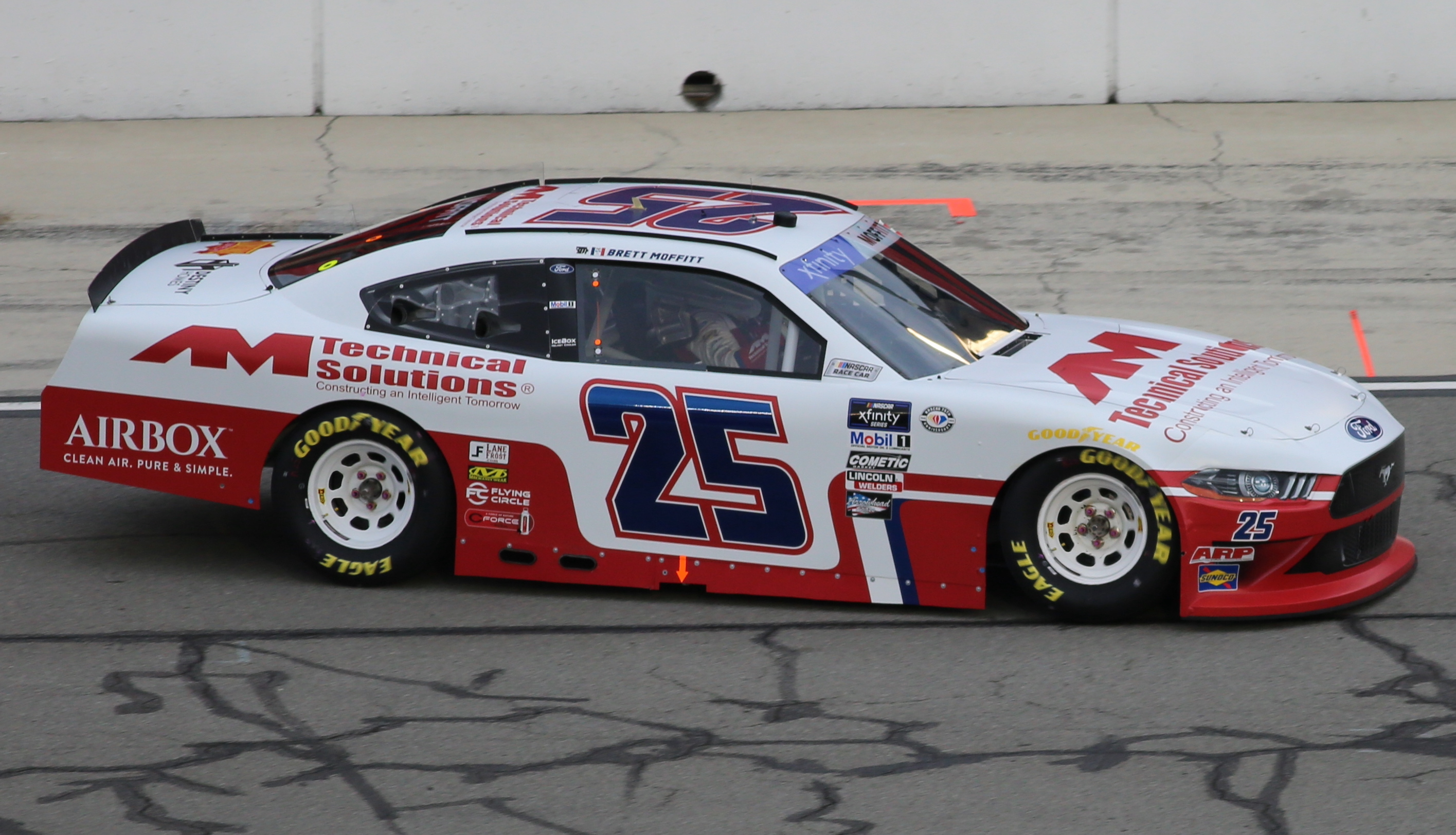
Moffitt at Auto Club Speedway in 2023

In 2023, Moffitt ran full-time with AM Racing, driving the No. 25 Ford Mustang. He also ran one Truck race in 2023, driving the Front Row Motorsports No. 34 Ford to victory lane at Talladega.

In 2024, Moffitt was announced to run part-time in NASCAR Craftsman Truck Series, namely the spring Kansas race, with Tricon Garage, driving the No. 1 Toyota Tundra. He would go on to finish fifth. Moffitt would also competed part-time in the NASCAR Xfinity Series, driving the No. 19 car for Joe Gibbs Racing at Iowa. On October 29, 2024, it was announced that Moffitt will drive the No. 4 Chevrolet for Hettinger Racing in the final two races of the Truck Series season after the team had purchased the assets of Bret Holmes Racing. The teams debut did not get off to a good start as Moffitt crashed late in the race and got thirtieth place DNF. The next week at Phoenix, Moffitt would rebound with a sixteenth-place finish.

== Personal life ==
Moffitt was born August 7, 1992, in Grimes, Iowa. Moffitt is the youngest of three children to parents Dick and Becky Moffitt (née McDowell). He was homeschooled for his junior and senior years of high school.

In March 2020, Moffitt broke his femur in a motocross accident while riding with friends in North Carolina. He did not miss any Truck races during his recovery as the season had been on hiatus due to the COVID-19 pandemic.

== Motorsports career results ==
=== Racing career summary ===
Season	Series	Team	Races	Wins	Top 5	Top 10	Points	Position
2009	NASCAR Camping World West Series	Andy Santerre Racing	1	0	1	1	160	49th
2009	NASCAR Camping World East Series	Andy Santerre Racing	11	2	6	9	1625	**3rd**
2009	ARCA Re/Max Series	Win-Tron Racing	1	0	0	1	430	68th
2010	NASCAR K&N Pro Series West	Joe Gibbs Racing	1	0	0	0	140	59th
2010	NASCAR K&N Pro Series East	Joe Gibbs Racing	10	2	6	7	1528	**2nd**
2011	NASCAR K&N Pro Series East	Michael Waltrip Racing	12	3	8	8	1851	**3rd**
2012	NASCAR K&N Pro Series East	Hattori Racing Enterprises	14	2	8	10	512	**3rd**
2012	NASCAR Nationwide Series	RAB Racing	1	0	0	1	35	71st
2013	NASCAR K&N Pro Series East	Hattori Racing Enterprises	14	0	5	10	503	**2nd**
2013	NASCAR Camping World Truck Series	Hattori Racing Enterprises	1	0	0	0	57	43rd
2013	NASCAR Camping World Truck Series	ThorSport Racing	1	0	0	0	57	43rd
2014	NASCAR Sprint Cup Series	Identity Ventures Racing	6	0	0	0	60	45th
2014	NASCAR Sprint Cup Series	Michael Waltrip Racing	1	0	0	0	60	45th
2015	NASCAR Sprint Cup Series	Michael Waltrip Racing	6	0	0	1	422	34th
2015	NASCAR Sprint Cup Series	Front Row Motorsports	25	0	0	0	422	34th
2016	NASCAR Camping World Truck Series	Red Horse Racing	6	1	3	4	141	27th
2017	NASCAR Camping World Truck Series	Red Horse Racing	6	0	0	1	126	31st
2017	NASCAR Xfinity Series	GMS Racing	1	0	0	0	0	NC†
2017	Monster Energy NASCAR Cup Series	BK Racing	7	0	0	0	0	NC†
2018	NASCAR K&N Pro Series East	Hattori Racing Enterprises	1	1	1	1	47	37th
2018	NASCAR Camping World Truck Series	Hattori Racing Enterprises	23	6	13	13	4040	**1st**
2019	NASCAR Gander Outdoors Truck Series	GMS Racing	23	4	13	17	4032	**3rd**
2019	NASCAR Xfinity Series	JR Motorsports	1	0	0	0	0	NC†
2020	NASCAR Gander Outdoors Truck Series	GMS Racing	23	1	10	16	4027	**3rd**
2020	NASCAR Xfinity Series	Our Motorsports	29	0	1	7	0	NC†
2021	NASCAR Camping World Truck Series	Niece Motorsports	6	0	0	1	0	NC†
2021	NASCAR Camping World Truck Series	AM Racing	1	0	0	0	0	NC†
2021	NASCAR Camping World Truck Series	Rackley W.A.R.	1	0	0	0	0	NC†
2021	NASCAR Xfinity Series	Our Motorsports	31	0	1	10	495	21st
2022	NASCAR Camping World Truck Series	AM Racing	2	0	0	0	0	NC†
2022	NASCAR Xfinity Series	Our Motorsports	20	0	0	3	416	21st
2022	NASCAR Xfinity Series	SS-Green Light Racing	1	0	0	1	416	21st
2023	NASCAR Craftsman Truck Series	Front Row Motorsports	1	1	1	1	0	NC†
2023	NASCAR Xfinity Series	AM Racing	33	0	1	9	680	15th
2024	NASCAR Craftsman Truck Series	TRICON Garage	2	0	1	1	87	35th
2024	NASCAR Craftsman Truck Series	Hettinger Racing	2	0	0	0	87	35th
2024	NASCAR Xfinity Series	Joe Gibbs Racing	1	0	0	0	0	NC†

^{†} As Moffitt was a guest driver, he was ineligible for championship points.

=== NASCAR ===
(key) (Bold – Pole position awarded by qualifying time. Italics – Pole position earned by points standings or practice time. * – Most laps led. ** – All laps led.)

==== Monster Energy Cup Series ====
Monster Energy NASCAR Cup Series results
Year	Team	No.	Make	1	2	3	4	5	6	7	8	9	10	11	12	13	14	15	16	17	18	19	20	21	22	23	24	25	26	27	28	29	30	31	32	33	34	35	36	MENCC	Pts	Ref
2014	Identity Ventures Racing	66	Toyota	DAY	PHO	LVS	BRI	CAL	MAR	TEX	DAR	RCH	TAL	KAN	CLT	DOV; 22	POC						IND; DNQ	POC	GLN	MCH	BRI; 42	ATL; 34	RCH	CHI	NHA	DOV	KAN	CLT; 40	TAL	MAR	TEX; 40	PHO	HOM; 36	45th	60	
2014	Michael Waltrip Racing	66	Toyota															MCH; 34	SON	KEN	DAY	NHA																		45th	60	
2015	Michael Waltrip Racing	55	Toyota	DAY	ATL; 8			CAL; 22	MAR; 28	TEX; 29	BRI; 17	RCH; 29	TAL																											34th	422	
2015	Front Row Motorsports	34	Ford			LVS; 37	PHO; 32							KAN; 34	CLT; 31	DOV; 28	POC; 30	MCH; 33	SON	DAY; 27	KEN; 32	NHA; 33	IND; 34	POC; 31	GLN	MCH; 34	BRI; 30	DAR; 36	RCH; 35	CHI; 31	NHA; 27	DOV; 42	CLT; 30	KAN; 32	TAL	MAR; 35	TEX; 30	PHO; 36	HOM; 31	34th	422	
2017	BK Racing	83	Toyota	DAY	ATL	LVS	PHO	CAL	MAR	TEX	BRI	RCH	TAL	KAN	CLT	DOV	POC	MCH	SON	DAY	KEN	NHA	IND	POC	GLN; 32	MCH; 32	BRI	DAR	RCH	CHI; 37	NHA; 32	DOV; 33	CLT; 39	TAL	KAN; 31	MAR	TEX	PHO	HOM	61st	0^{1}	

==== Xfinity Series ====
NASCAR Xfinity Series results
Year	Team	No.	Make	1	2	3	4	5	6	7	8	9	10	11	12	13	14	15	16	17	18	19	20	21	22	23	24	25	26	27	28	29	30	31	32	33	NXSC	Pts	Ref
2012	RAB Racing	99	Toyota	DAY	PHO	LVS	BRI	CAL	TEX	RCH	TAL	DAR	IOW	CLT	DOV	MCH	EKL	KEN	DAY	NHA	CHI	IND	IOW; 9	GLN	CGV	BRI	ATL	RCH	CHI	KEN	DOV	CLT	KAN	TEX	PHO	HOM	71st	35	
2017	GMS Racing	96	Chevy	DAY	ATL	LVS	PHO	CAL	TEX	BRI	RCH	TAL	CLT	DOV	POC	MCH	IOW	DAY	KEN	NHA	IND	IOW; 11	GLN	MOH	BRI	ROA	DAR	RCH	CHI	KEN	DOV	CLT	KAN	TEX	PHO	HOM	103rd	0^{1}	
2019	JR Motorsports	8	Chevy	DAY	ATL	LVS	PHO	CAL	TEX	BRI	RCH	TAL; 13	DOV	CLT	POC	MCH	IOW	CHI	DAY	KEN	NHA	IOW	GLN	MOH	BRI	ROA	DAR	IND	LVS	RCH	ROV	DOV	KAN	TEX	PHO	HOM	91st	0^{1}	
2020	Our Motorsports	02	Chevy	DAY; 24	LVS; 15	CAL; 14	PHO; 19	DAR; 11	CLT; 6	BRI	ATL; 14	HOM; 35	HOM	TAL; 5	POC; 7	IRC; 36	KEN; 10	KEN; 17	TEX; 16	KAN; 34	ROA	DRC	DOV; 15	DOV; 10	DAY; 27	DAR; 33	RCH; 6	RCH; 18	BRI; 26	LVS; 14	TAL; 27	ROV; 38	KAN; 7	TEX; 14	MAR; 13	PHO; 19	77th	0^{1}	
2021	Our Motorsports	02	Chevy	DAY; 2	DRC; 11	HOM; 7	LVS; 34	PHO; 9	ATL; 40	MAR; 12	TAL; 17	DAR; 8	DOV; 13	COA; 12	CLT; 25	MOH; 31	TEX; 8	NSH; 23	POC; 11	ROA; 31	ATL; 6	NHA; 9	GLN; 26	IRC; 31	MCH; 8	DAY; 11	DAR	RCH	BRI; 40	LVS; 12	TAL; 26	ROV; 37	TEX; 16	KAN; 6	MAR; 19	PHO; 8	21st	495	
2022	Our Motorsports	02	Chevy	DAY; 34	CAL; 19	LVS; 8	PHO; 15	ATL; 14	COA; 7	RCH; 25	MAR; 37	TAL; 10	DOV; 13	DAR; 13	TEX; 29	CLT; 11	PIR; 20	NSH; 10	ROA; 35	ATL; 20	NHA; 14	POC; 18	IRC; 16	MCH	GLN	DAY	DAR										21st	416	
2022	SS-Green Light Racing	07	Ford																									KAN; 10	BRI	TEX	TAL	ROV	LVS	HOM	MAR	PHO	21st	416	
2023	AM Racing	25	Ford	DAY; 29	CAL; 9	LVS; 22	PHO; 13	ATL; 6	COA; 34	RCH; 22	MAR; 9	TAL; 12*	DOV; 15	DAR; 20	CLT; 29	PIR; 12	SON; 12	NSH; 14	CSC; 4	ATL; 11	NHA; 9	POC; 8	ROA; 36	MCH; 17	IRC; 10	GLN; 29	DAY; 18	DAR; 25	KAN; 7	BRI; 16	TEX; 10	ROV; 38	LVS; 24	HOM; 35	MAR; 20	PHO; 15	15th	680	
2024	Joe Gibbs Racing	19	Toyota	DAY	ATL	LVS	PHO	COA	RCH	MAR	TEX	TAL	DOV	DAR	CLT	PIR	SON	IOW; 18	NHA	NSH	CSC	POC	IND	MCH	DAY	DAR	ATL	GLN	BRI	KAN	TAL	ROV	LVS	HOM	MAR	PHO	98th	0^{1}	

==== Craftsman Truck Series ====
NASCAR Craftsman Truck Series results
Year	Team	No.	Make	1	2	3	4	5	6	7	8	9	10	11	12	13	14	15	16	17	18	19	20	21	22	23	NCTC	Pts	Ref
2013	ThorSport Racing	13	Toyota	DAY	MAR	CAR	KAN	CLT	DOV	TEX	KEN; 14	IOW	ELD	POC													43rd	57	
2013	Hattori Racing Enterprises	16	Toyota												MCH; 17	BRI	MSP	IOW	CHI	LVS	TAL	MAR	TEX	PHO	HOM		43rd	57	
2016	Red Horse Racing	11	Toyota	DAY	ATL	MAR	KAN	DOV	CLT	TEX	IOW	GTW	KEN; 31	ELD	POC; 3	BRI; 2	MCH; 1	MSP; 16	CHI	NHA; 8	LVS	TAL	MAR	TEX	PHO	HOM	27th	141	
2017	Red Horse Racing	7	Toyota	DAY; 22	ATL; 11	MAR; 6	KAN; 7	CLT; 18	DOV	TEX	GTW	IOW	KEN	ELD	POC	MCH	BRI	MSP	CHI	NHA	LVS	TAL	MAR	TEX	PHO	HOM	31st	126	
2018	Hattori Racing Enterprises	16	Toyota	DAY; 26	ATL; 1	LVS; 3	MAR; 3	DOV; 12	KAN; 16	CLT; 4	TEX; 18	IOW; 1*	GTW; 14	CHI; 1	KEN; 18	ELD; 5	POC; 26	MCH; 1	BRI; 18	MSP; 3	LVS; 11	TAL; 17	MAR; 2	TEX; 3	PHO; 1	HOM; 1*	1st	4040	
2019	GMS Racing	24	Chevy	DAY; 26	ATL; 4	LVS; 2	MAR; 3	TEX; 19	**DOV**; 2*	KAN; 8	CLT; 19	TEX; 11	IOW; 1	GTW; 5	CHI; 1*	KEN; 7	POC; 5	ELD; 29	MCH; 4	**BRI**; 1	**MSP**; 1*	LVS; 7	TAL; 4	MAR; 29	PHO; 10	HOM; 5	3rd	4032	
2020	GMS Racing	23	Chevy	DAY; 13	LVS; 16	CLT; 4	ATL; 8	HOM; 36	POC; 7	KEN; 11*	TEX; 5	KAN; 2	KAN; 27	MCH; 6	DRC; 2	DOV; 3*	GTW; 2	DAR; 10	RCH; 4	BRI; 2*	LVS; 15	TAL; 7	KAN; 1	TEX; 5	MAR; 28	PHO; 10*	3rd	4027	
2021	Niece Motorsports	45	Chevy	DAY; 25	DRC; 25	LVS; 11	ATL; 9	BRD; 24	RCH; 37	KAN	DAR	COA	CLT	TEX	NSH	POC											101st	0^{2}	
2021	AM Racing	37	Chevy														KNX; 38	GLN	GTW	DAR	BRI						101st	0^{2}	
2021	Rackley W.A.R.	25	Chevy																			LVS; 25	TAL	MAR	PHO		101st	0^{2}	
2022	AM Racing	22	Chevy	DAY	LVS	ATL	COA	MAR	BRD	DAR	KAN	TEX	CLT	GTW	SON	KNX; 32	NSH	MOH	POC	IRP	RCH	KAN; 36	BRI	TAL	HOM	PHO	103rd	0^{1}	
2023	Front Row Motorsports	34	Ford	DAY	LVS	ATL	COA	TEX	BRD	MAR	KAN	DAR	NWS	CLT	GTW	NSH	MOH	POC	RCH	IRP	MLW	KAN	BRI	TAL; 1	HOM	PHO	87th	0^{1}	
2024	Tricon Garage	1	Toyota	DAY	ATL	LVS	BRI	COA	MAR	TEX	KAN; 5	DAR	NWS	CLT; 15	GTW	NSH	POC	IRP	RCH	MLW	BRI	KAN	TAL	HOM			35th	87	
2024	Hettinger Racing	4	Chevy																						MAR; 30	PHO; 16	35th	87	

^{*} Season still in progress
^{1} Ineligible for series points
^{2} Moffitt started the 2021 season running for Truck Series points but switched to the Xfinity Series starting at Talladega in April.

=== ARCA Re/Max Series ===
(key) (Bold – Pole position awarded by qualifying time. Italics – Pole position earned by points standings or practice time. * – Most laps led.)

ARCA Re/Max Series results
Year	Team	No.	Make	1	2	3	4	5	6	7	8	9	10	11	12	13	14	15	16	17	18	19	20	21	ARSC	Pts	Ref
2009	Win-Tron Racing	32	Dodge	DAY	SLM	CAR	TAL	KEN	TOL	POC	MCH	MFD	IOW	KEN	BLN	POC	ISF	CHI	TOL	DSF	NJE	SLM	KAN	CAR; 10	68th	430	

==== K&N Pro Series East ====
NASCAR K&N Pro Series East results
Year	Team	No.	Make	1	2	3	4	5	6	7	8	9	10	11	12	13	14	NKNPSEC	Pts	Ref
2009	Andy Santerre Racing	44	Chevy	**GRE**; 5	TRI; 23	IOW; 4	SBO; 1*	GLN; 3	NHA; 27	TMP; 10	ADI; 8	LRP; 9	NHA; 2	DOV; 1*				3rd	1625	
2010	Joe Gibbs Racing	20	Toyota	GRE; 24	SBO; 6		MAR; 1	**NHA**; 5	LRP; 4	LEE; 3	JFC; 17	**NHA**; 2	DOV; 1					2nd	1528	
2010	Joe Gibbs Racing	02	Toyota			IOW; 11												2nd	1528	
2011	Michael Waltrip Racing	00	Toyota	**GRE**; 1**	SBO; 24	RCH; 2	IOW; 1*	BGS; 16	JFC; 16	LGY; 2	NHA; 2	COL; 3	GRE; 2	NHA; 1*	DOV; 21			3rd	1851	
2012	Hattori Racing Enterprises	11	Toyota	BRI; 32	GRE; 4	**RCH**; 1*	**IOW**; 5*	BGS; 9	JFC; 3	LGY; 2*	**CNB**; 1**	COL; 2	IOW; 5	**NHA**; 16*	DOV; 18*	GRE; 8*	CAR; 21	3rd	512	
2013	Hattori Racing Enterprises	11	Toyota	BRI; 2	**GRE**; 5*	FIF; 4	RCH; 6	**BGS**; 13*	IOW; 2	LGY; 20	COL; 7	IOW; 7	VIR; 3	GRE; 9	NHA; 7	DOV; 11	RAL; 24	2nd	503	
2018	Hattori Racing Enterprises	1	Toyota	NSM	BRI	LGY	SBO	SBO	MEM	NJM	THO	NHA	IOW	GLN; 1	GTW	NHA	DOV	37th	47	

==== K&N Pro Series West ====
NASCAR K&N Pro Series West results
Year	Team	No.	Make	1	2	3	4	5	6	7	8	9	10	11	12	13	NKNPSWC	Pts	Ref
2009	Andy Santerre Racing	4	Chevy	CTS	AAS	PHO	MAD	IOW	DCS	SON	IRW	PIR	MMP	CNS	IOW; 4	AAS	49th	160	
2010	Joe Gibbs Racing	11	Toyota	AAS	PHO	IOW	DCS	SON	IRW	PIR	MRP	CNS	MMP	AAS	PHO; 11*		59th	140	

Awards
Preceded by Kyle Larson	NASCAR Sprint Cup Series Rookie of the Year; 2015	Succeeded by Chase Elliott
Preceded by Christopher Bell	NASCAR Camping World Truck Series Champion; 2018	Succeeded by Matt Crafton
