= Harris Clash =

Annual racing event

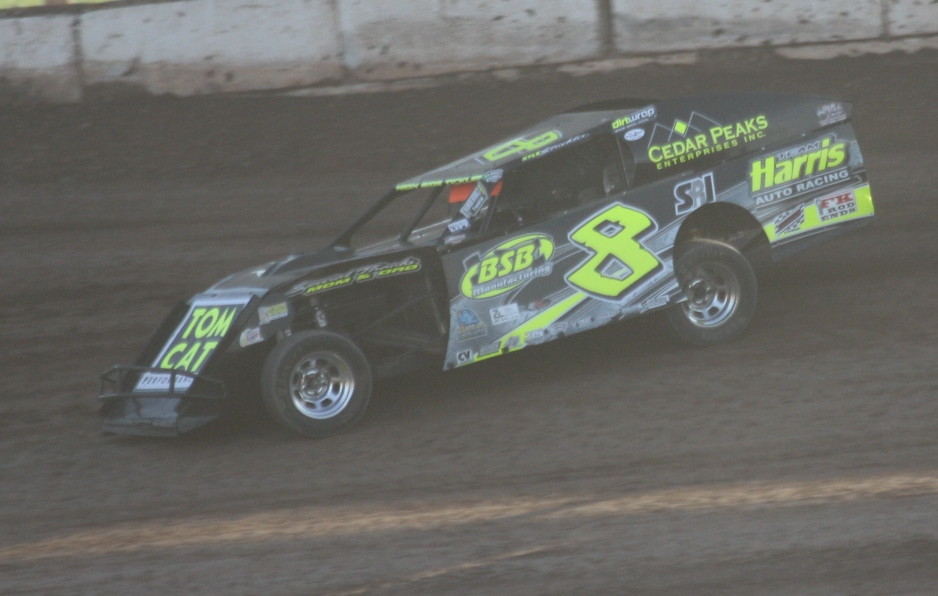
2013 Harris Clash winner Kyle Strickler's IMCA Modified

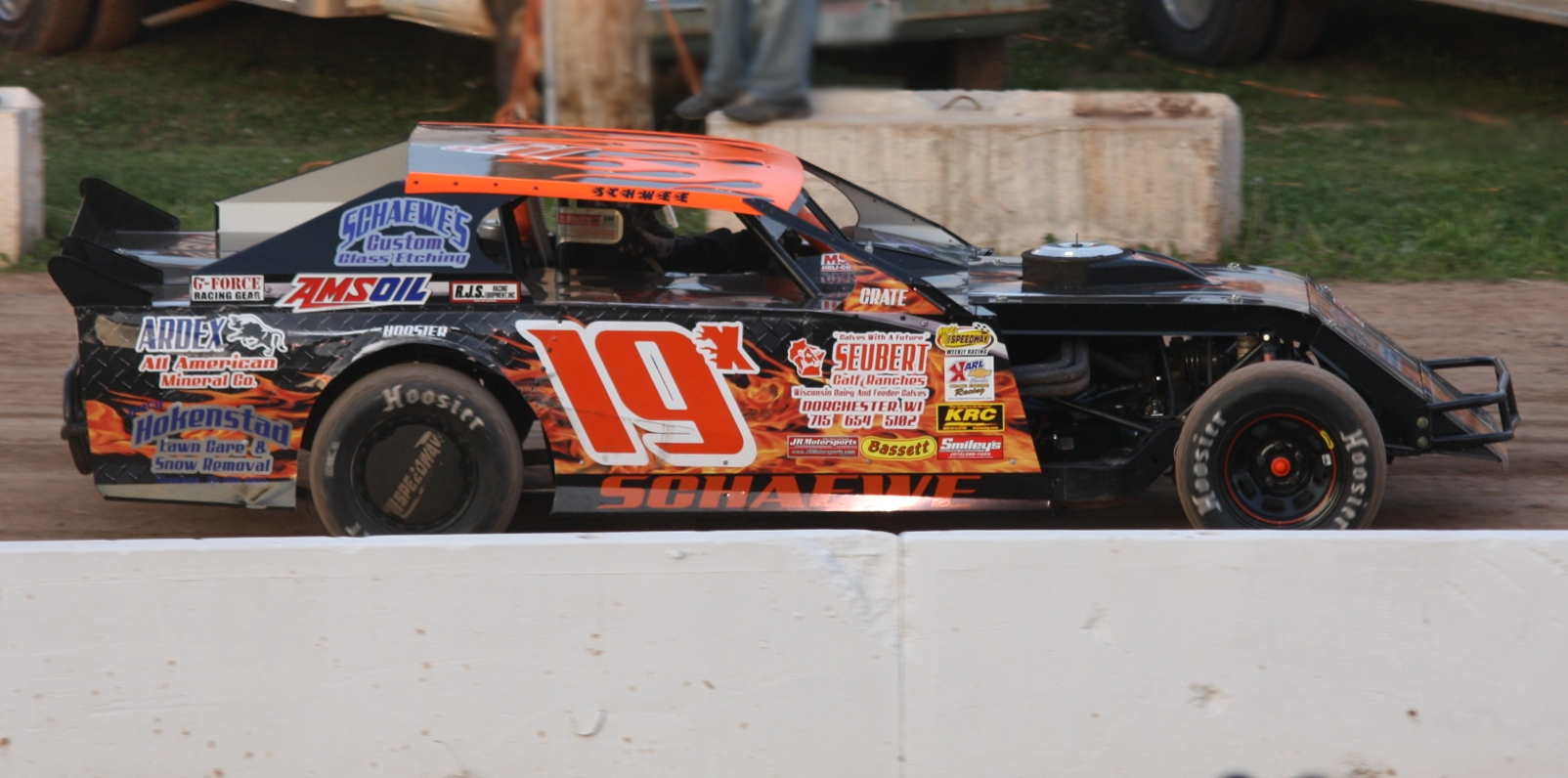
IMCA Sport Modified

The Harris Clash is an annual racing event held in early August. The event is sanctioned by IMCA and promoted by Bob Harris Enterprises. It is widely regarded as being one of the best IMCA modified races in the country, drawing hundreds of cars and thousands of fans every year.

The Harris Clash was started in 1992 by Bob Harris of the Harris Auto Racing Company (current owner of Bob Harris Enterprises) as a challenge to other racing chassis manufacturers. Not only is the winning driver of the race given national recognition, but unlike other major events, the car manufacturer is also given major exposure. In 2015, the event included two classes: IMCA Modifieds and IMCA SportMods (which is an entry-level modified division). The IMCA Late Models are no longer included in the Harris Clash event. In late 2024, it was announced that the 2025 Harris Clash would add the IMCA Stock Cars .

It was announced that the 2018 Harris Clash would be moved to the Deer Creek Speedway, in Spring Valley, MN. The 2018 event was the first IMCA race held at the track.

It was announced in 2024, that the 2025 Harris Clash would be moved back to central Iowa and be held at the Boone Speedway.

== Harris Clash Winners (Chassis Manufacturer) ==
Modifieds:

- 1992: Kelly Shryock (Harris Chassis) at Webster City
- 1993: Denny Hovinga (Harris Chassis) at Webster City
- 1994: Bill Davis, Sr. (Harris Chassis) at Boone
- 1995: Tim Donlinger (Kosiski Chassis) at Harlan
- 1996: Mark Noble (Pro Chassis) at Knoxville
- 1997: Kelly Shryock (Harris Chassis) at Knoxville
- 1998: Bill Davis, Sr. (Harris Chassis) at Knoxville
- 1999: Troy Folkerts (Racemart Chassis) at Knoxville
- 2000: John Logue (Harris Chassis) at Knoxville
- 2001: Johnny Saathoff (Jet Chassis) at Knoxville
- 2002: Scott Allen (Dirt Works Chassis) at Knoxville
- 2003: Greg Metz (Harris Chassis) at Knoxville
- 2004: Gary Clark (Dirt Works Chassis) at Knoxville
- 2005: Greg Metz (Harris Chassis) at Knoxville
- 2006: Jeremie Hedrick (Race Tech Chassis) at Knoxville
- 2007: Clayton Christensen (Skyrocket Chassis) at Knoxville
- 2008: RAIN at Knoxville
- 2009: Jay Noteboom (Harris Chassis) at Knoxville
- 2010: Richie Gustin (Skyrocket Chassis) at Knoxville
- 2011: Eric Dailey (Skyrocket Chassis) at Knoxville
- 2012: Kyle Strickler (Harris Chassis) at Knoxville
- 2013: Kyle Strickler (Harris Chassis) at Knoxville
- 2014: Chris Abelson (Razor Chassis) at Knoxville
- 2015: Ethan Dotson (GRT Chassis) at Webster City
- 2016: Joel Rust (Rage Chassis) at Webster City
- 2017: Richie Gustin (Gheer'd Up Chassis) at Webster City
- 2018: Cayden Carter (VanderBuilt Race Cars) at Deer Creek
- 2019: Austin Arneson (VanderBuilt Race Cars) at Deer Creek
- 2020: Ethan Dotson (Victory Circle Chassis) at Deer Creek
- 2021: Zane DeVilbiss (DeVilbiss Chassis) at Deer Creek
- 2022: Tom Berry Jr. (Harris Chassis) at Deer Creek
- 2023: Tim Ward (Performer Chassis) at Deer Creek
- 2024: Tom Berry Jr. (Lethal Chassis) at Deer Creek
- 2025: Ethan Braaksma (Rage Chassis) at Boone
- 2026: Joel Rust (Performer Chassis) at Boone

Sport Modifieds:

- 2006: Jacob Murray (Hoover Chassis) at Knoxville
- 2007: Brett Moffitt (Victory Chassis) at Knoxville
- 2008: RAIN at Knoxville
- 2009: Matt Lettow (Skyrocket Chassis) at Knoxville
- 2010: Jared Timmerman (Harris Chassis) at Knoxville
- 2011: Jesse Sobbing (Razor Chassis) at Knoxville
- 2012: Matt Lettow (Skyrocket Chassis) at Knoxville
- 2013: Doug Smith (Harris Chassis) at Knoxville
- 2014: Brett Lowry (Harris Chassis) at Knoxville
- 2015: Doug Smith (Harris Chassis) at Webster City
- 2016: Adam Armstrong (Jet Chassis) at Webster City
- 2017: Jared VanDeest (Skyrocket Chassis) at Webster City
- 2018: Jake McBirnie (GRT Chassis) at Deer Creek
- 2019: Brayton Carter (VanderBuilt Race Cars) at Deer Creek
- 2020: Cody Thompson (Razor Chassis) at Deer Creek
- 2021: Rocky Caudle (GRT by BHE) at Deer Creek
- 2022: Alec Fett (GRT by BHE) at Deer Creek
- 2023: Cam Reimers (GRT by BHE) at Deer Creek
- 2024: Cam Reimers (GRT by BHE) at Deer Creek
- 2025: Jake Sachau (Performer Chassis) at Boone
- 2026: Brayton Carter (VanderBuilt Chassis) at Boone

Late Models:

- 2009: Tommy Elston (GRT Chassis) at Knoxville
- 2010: Ray Guss, Jr. (Mastersbilt Chassis) at Knoxville
- 2011: Nate Beuseling (Mach-1 Chassis) at Knoxville

Stock Cars:

- 2025: Kaden Reynolds (Johnny Spaw Racecar) at Boone
- 2026: Tripp Gaylord (VanderBuilt Chassis) at Boone
