= 2017 Hollywood Casino 400 =

Race details
- Race 32 of 36 in the 2017 Monster Energy NASCAR Cup Series
- Date: October 22, 2017
- Location: Kansas Speedway in Kansas City, Kansas
- Course: Permanent racing facility
- Course length: 1.5 miles (2.4 km)
- Distance: 267 laps, 400.5 mi (640.8 km)
- Average speed: 125.189 miles per hour (201.472 km/h)

Pole position
Driver	Martin Truex Jr.	Furniture Row Racing
- Time: 28.719

Most laps led
Driver	Kyle Busch	Joe Gibbs Racing
- Laps: 112

Winner
No. 78	Martin Truex Jr.	Furniture Row Racing

Television in the United States
- Network: NBCSN
- Announcers: Rick Allen, Jeff Burton and Steve Letarte

Radio in the United States
- Radio: MRN
- Booth announcers: Joe Moore, Jeff Striegle and Rusty Wallace
- Turn announcers: Dave Moody (1 & 2) and Mike Bagley (3 & 4)

The 2017 Hollywood Casino 400 was a Monster Energy NASCAR Cup Series race that took place on October 22, 2017, at Kansas Speedway in Kansas City, Kansas. Contested over 267 laps on the 1.5 miles (2.4 km) intermediate speedway, it was the 32nd race of the 2017 Monster Energy NASCAR Cup Series season, the sixth race of the Playoffs, and the final race of the Round of 12. Martin Truex Jr. of Furniture Row Racing won the race.

== Entry list ==
No.	Driver	Team	Manufacturer
00	Derrike Cope	StarCom Racing	Chevrolet
1	Jamie McMurray	Chip Ganassi Racing	Chevrolet
2	Brad Keselowski	Team Penske	Ford
3	Austin Dillon	Richard Childress Racing	Chevrolet
4	Kevin Harvick	Stewart–Haas Racing	Ford
5	Kasey Kahne	Hendrick Motorsports	Chevrolet
6	Trevor Bayne	Roush Fenway Racing	Ford
10	Danica Patrick	Stewart–Haas Racing	Ford
11	Denny Hamlin	Joe Gibbs Racing	Toyota
13	Ty Dillon (R)	Germain Racing	Chevrolet
14	Clint Bowyer	Stewart–Haas Racing	Ford
15	Reed Sorenson	Premium Motorsports	Chevrolet
17	Ricky Stenhouse Jr.	Roush Fenway Racing	Ford
18	Kyle Busch	Joe Gibbs Racing	Toyota
19	Daniel Suárez (R)	Joe Gibbs Racing	Toyota
20	Matt Kenseth	Joe Gibbs Racing	Toyota
21	Ryan Blaney	Wood Brothers Racing	Ford
22	Joey Logano	Team Penske	Ford
23	Corey LaJoie (R)	BK Racing	Toyota
24	Chase Elliott	Hendrick Motorsports	Chevrolet
27	Paul Menard	Richard Childress Racing	Chevrolet
31	Ryan Newman	Richard Childress Racing	Chevrolet
32	Matt DiBenedetto	Go Fas Racing	Ford
33	Jeffrey Earnhardt	Circle Sport – The Motorsports Group	Chevrolet
34	Landon Cassill	Front Row Motorsports	Ford
37	Chris Buescher	JTG Daugherty Racing	Chevrolet
38	David Ragan	Front Row Motorsports	Ford
41	Kurt Busch	Stewart–Haas Racing	Ford
42	Kyle Larson	Chip Ganassi Racing	Chevrolet
43	Aric Almirola	Richard Petty Motorsports	Ford
47	A. J. Allmendinger	JTG Daugherty Racing	Chevrolet
48	Jimmie Johnson	Hendrick Motorsports	Chevrolet
51	B. J. McLeod (i)	Rick Ware Racing	Chevrolet
55	Gray Gaulding (R)	Premium Motorsports	Toyota
72	Cole Whitt	TriStar Motorsports	Chevrolet
77	Erik Jones (R)	Furniture Row Racing	Toyota
78	Martin Truex Jr.	Furniture Row Racing	Toyota
83	Brett Moffitt (i)	BK Racing	Toyota
88	Dale Earnhardt Jr.	Hendrick Motorsports	Chevrolet
95	Michael McDowell	Leavine Family Racing	Chevrolet
Official entry list

== Practice ==
=== First practice ===
Kyle Larson was the fastest in the first practice session with a time of 28.563 seconds and a speed of 189.056 mph (304.256 km/h).

Pos	No.	Driver	Team	Manufacturer	Time	Speed
1	42	Kyle Larson	Chip Ganassi Racing	Chevrolet	28.563	189.056
2	4	Kevin Harvick	Stewart–Haas Racing	Ford	28.800	187.500
3	18	Kyle Busch	Joe Gibbs Racing	Toyota	28.826	187.331
Official first practice results

=== Second practice ===
Kyle Larson was the fastest in the second practice session with a time of 29.724 seconds and a speed of 181.671 mph (292.371 km/h).

Pos	No.	Driver	Team	Manufacturer	Time	Speed
1	42	Kyle Larson	Chip Ganassi Racing	Chevrolet	29.724	181.671
2	4	Kevin Harvick	Stewart–Haas Racing	Ford	29.738	181.586
3	19	Daniel Suárez (R)	Joe Gibbs Racing	Toyota	29.750	181.513
Official second practice results

=== Final practice ===
Ryan Blaney was the fastest in the final practice session with a time of 29.661 seconds and a speed of 182.057 mph (292.992 km/h).

Pos	No.	Driver	Team	Manufacturer	Time	Speed
1	21	Ryan Blaney	Wood Brothers Racing	Ford	29.661	182.057
2	18	Kyle Busch	Joe Gibbs Racing	Toyota	29.696	181.843
3	4	Kevin Harvick	Stewart–Haas Racing	Ford	29.716	181.720
Official final practice results

== Qualifying ==
Martin Truex Jr. scored the pole for the race with a time of 28.719 and a speed of 188.029 mph (302.603 km/h).

=== Qualifying results ===
Pos	No.	Driver	Team	Manufacturer	R1	R2	R3
1	78	Martin Truex Jr.	Furniture Row Racing	Toyota	29.041	28.824	28.719
2	4	Kevin Harvick	Stewart–Haas Racing	Ford	29.089	28.795	28.772
3	21	Ryan Blaney	Wood Brothers Racing	Ford	29.103	28.836	28.782
4	20	Matt Kenseth	Joe Gibbs Racing	Toyota	29.061	28.850	28.784
5	11	Denny Hamlin	Joe Gibbs Racing	Toyota	29.057	28.953	28.806
6	19	Daniel Suárez (R)	Joe Gibbs Racing	Toyota	29.151	28.963	28.891
7	77	Erik Jones (R)	Furniture Row Racing	Toyota	29.137	28.998	28.921
8	18	Kyle Busch	Joe Gibbs Racing	Toyota	29.329	28.898	28.981
9	1	Jamie McMurray	Chip Ganassi Racing	Chevrolet	29.071	29.019	29.089
10	14	Clint Bowyer	Stewart–Haas Racing	Ford	29.202	28.999	29.095
11	2	Brad Keselowski	Team Penske	Ford	29.229	28.811	29.213
12	3	Austin Dillon	Richard Childress Racing	Chevrolet	29.164	28.980	29.333
13	48	Jimmie Johnson	Hendrick Motorsports	Chevrolet	29.207	29.039	—
14	42	Kyle Larson	Chip Ganassi Racing	Chevrolet	29.286	29.051	—
15	24	Chase Elliott	Hendrick Motorsports	Chevrolet	29.214	29.069	—
16	41	Kurt Busch	Stewart–Haas Racing	Ford	28.980	29.146	—
17	95	Michael McDowell	Leavine Family Racing	Chevrolet	29.280	29.160	—
18	22	Joey Logano	Team Penske	Ford	29.314	29.193	—
19	31	Ryan Newman	Richard Childress Racing	Chevrolet	29.194	29.194	—
20	88	Dale Earnhardt Jr.	Hendrick Motorsports	Chevrolet	29.063	29.217	—
21	37	Chris Buescher	JTG Daugherty Racing	Chevrolet	29.311	29.240	—
22	5	Kasey Kahne	Hendrick Motorsports	Chevrolet	29.292	29.263	—
23	10	Danica Patrick	Stewart–Haas Racing	Ford	28.985	29.269	—
24	27	Paul Menard	Richard Childress Racing	Chevrolet	29.384	29.314	—
25	17	Ricky Stenhouse Jr.	Roush Fenway Racing	Ford	29.421	—	—
26	43	Aric Almirola	Richard Petty Motorsports	Ford	29.429	—	—
27	47	A. J. Allmendinger	JTG Daugherty Racing	Chevrolet	29.553	—	—
28	38	David Ragan	Front Row Motorsports	Ford	29.656	—	—
29	6	Trevor Bayne	Roush Fenway Racing	Ford	29.660	—	—
30	13	Ty Dillon (R)	Germain Racing	Chevrolet	29.682	—	—
31	32	Matt DiBenedetto	Go Fas Racing	Ford	29.698	—	—
32	34	Landon Cassill	Front Row Motorsports	Ford	30.143	—	—
33	83	Brett Moffitt (i)	BK Racing	Toyota	30.149	—	—
34	55	Gray Gaulding (R)	Premium Motorsports	Toyota	30.225	—	—
35	23	Corey LaJoie (R)	BK Racing	Toyota	30.235	—	—
36	72	Cole Whitt	TriStar Motorsports	Chevrolet	30.245	—	—
37	51	B. J. McLeod (i)	Rick Ware Racing	Chevrolet	30.394	—	—
38	15	Reed Sorenson	Premium Motorsports	Chevrolet	30.445	—	—
39	33	Jeffrey Earnhardt	Circle Sport – The Motorsports Group	Chevrolet	30.530	—	—
40	00	Derrike Cope	StarCom Racing	Chevrolet	0.000	—	—
Official qualifying results

- Ryan Blaney started last after failing post-qualifying inspection.

== Race ==
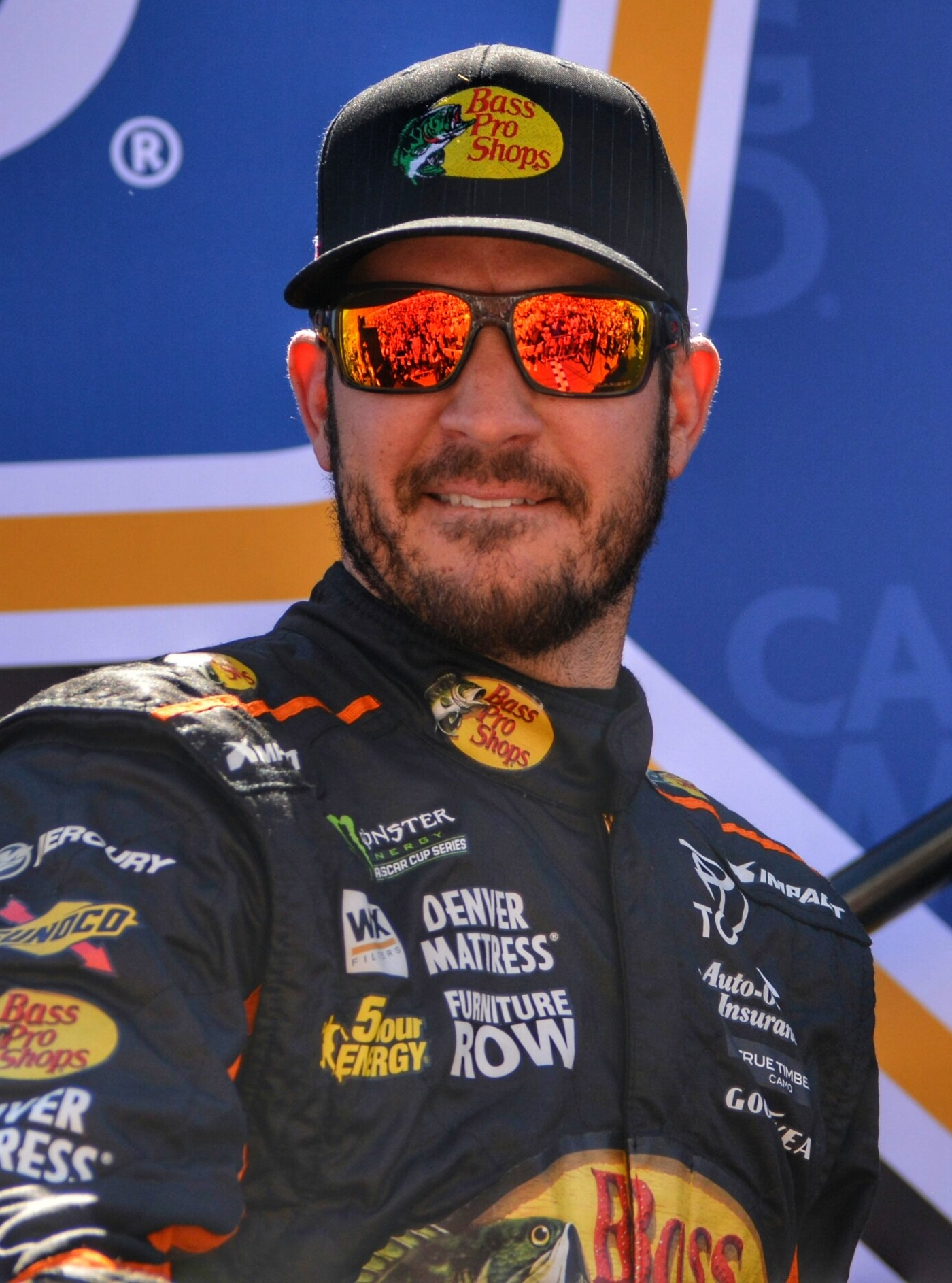
Martin Truex Jr. won the race from the pole position.

=== Stage results ===
Stage 1 Laps: 80

Pos	No	Driver	Team	Manufacturer	Points
1	18	Kyle Busch	Joe Gibbs Racing	Toyota	10
2	4	Kevin Harvick	Stewart–Haas Racing	Ford	9
3	11	Denny Hamlin	Joe Gibbs Racing	Toyota	8
4	21	Ryan Blaney	Wood Brothers Racing	Ford	7
5	1	Jamie McMurray	Chip Ganassi Racing	Chevrolet	6
6	48	Jimmie Johnson	Hendrick Motorsports	Chevrolet	5
7	24	Chase Elliott	Hendrick Motorsports	Chevrolet	4
8	78	Martin Truex Jr.	Furniture Row Racing	Toyota	3
9	20	Matt Kenseth	Joe Gibbs Racing	Toyota	2
10	77	Erik Jones (R)	Furniture Row Racing	Toyota	1
Official stage one results

Stage 2 Laps: 80

Pos	No	Driver	Team	Manufacturer	Points
1	11	Denny Hamlin	Joe Gibbs Racing	Toyota	10
2	4	Kevin Harvick	Stewart–Haas Racing	Ford	9
3	2	Brad Keselowski	Team Penske	Ford	8
4	20	Matt Kenseth	Joe Gibbs Racing	Toyota	7
5	18	Kyle Busch	Joe Gibbs Racing	Toyota	6
6	77	Erik Jones (R)	Furniture Row Racing	Toyota	5
7	1	Jamie McMurray	Chip Ganassi Racing	Chevrolet	4
8	21	Ryan Blaney	Wood Brothers Racing	Ford	3
9	24	Chase Elliott	Hendrick Motorsports	Chevrolet	2
10	48	Jimmie Johnson	Hendrick Motorsports	Chevrolet	1
Official stage two results

=== Final stage results ===
Stage 3 Laps: 107

Pos	Grid	No	Driver	Team	Manufacturer	Laps	Points
1	1	78	Martin Truex Jr.	Furniture Row Racing	Toyota	267	43
2	15	41	Kurt Busch	Stewart–Haas Racing	Ford	267	35
3	40	21	Ryan Blaney	Wood Brothers Racing	Ford	267	44
4	14	24	Chase Elliott	Hendrick Motorsports	Chevrolet	267	39
5	4	11	Denny Hamlin	Joe Gibbs Racing	Toyota	267	50
6	20	37	Chris Buescher	JTG Daugherty Racing	Chevrolet	267	31
7	19	88	Dale Earnhardt Jr.	Hendrick Motorsports	Chevrolet	267	30
8	2	4	Kevin Harvick	Stewart–Haas Racing	Ford	267	47
9	25	43	Aric Almirola	Richard Petty Motorsports	Ford	267	28
10	7	18	Kyle Busch	Joe Gibbs Racing	Toyota	267	43
11	12	48	Jimmie Johnson	Hendrick Motorsports	Chevrolet	267	32
12	23	27	Paul Menard	Richard Childress Racing	Chevrolet	267	25
13	10	2	Brad Keselowski	Team Penske	Ford	267	32
14	11	3	Austin Dillon	Richard Childress Racing	Chevrolet	267	23
15	21	5	Kasey Kahne	Hendrick Motorsports	Chevrolet	267	22
16	29	13	Ty Dillon (R)	Germain Racing	Chevrolet	267	21
17	27	38	David Ragan	Front Row Motorsports	Ford	267	20
18	16	95	Michael McDowell	Leavine Family Racing	Chevrolet	267	19
19	9	14	Clint Bowyer	Stewart–Haas Racing	Ford	267	18
20	28	6	Trevor Bayne	Roush Fenway Racing	Ford	267	17
21	17	22	Joey Logano	Team Penske	Ford	267	16
22	30	32	Matt DiBenedetto	Go Fas Racing	Ford	267	15
23	31	34	Landon Cassill	Front Row Motorsports	Ford	265	14
24	35	72	Cole Whitt	TriStar Motorsports	Chevrolet	263	13
25	37	15	Reed Sorenson	Premium Motorsports	Chevrolet	263	12
26	38	33	Jeffrey Earnhardt	Circle Sport – The Motorsports Group	Chevrolet	261	11
27	34	23	Corey LaJoie (R)	BK Racing	Toyota	261	10
28	33	55	Gray Gaulding (R)	Premium Motorsports	Toyota	259	9
29	24	17	Ricky Stenhouse Jr.	Roush Fenway Racing	Ford	256	8
30	36	51	B. J. McLeod (i)	Rick Ware Racing	Chevrolet	254	0
31	32	83	Brett Moffitt (i)	BK Racing	Toyota	238	0
32	26	47	A. J. Allmendinger	JTG Daugherty Racing	Chevrolet	232	5
33	18	31	Ryan Newman	Richard Childress Racing	Chevrolet	203	4
34	8	1	Jamie McMurray	Chip Ganassi Racing	Chevrolet	198	13
35	6	77	Erik Jones (R)	Furniture Row Racing	Toyota	197	8
36	5	19	Daniel Suárez (R)	Joe Gibbs Racing	Toyota	197	1
37	3	20	Matt Kenseth	Joe Gibbs Racing	Toyota	197	10
38	22	10	Danica Patrick	Stewart–Haas Racing	Ford	197	1
39	13	42	Kyle Larson	Chip Ganassi Racing	Chevrolet	73	1
40	39	00	Derrike Cope	StarCom Racing	Chevrolet	35	1
Official race results

=== Race statistics ===
- Lead changes: 7 among different drivers
- Cautions/Laps: 10 for 49
- Red flags: 1 for 10 minutes and 10 seconds
- Time of race: 3 hours, 11 minutes, 57 seconds
- Average speed: 125.189 miles per hour (201.472 km/h)

== Media ==
=== Television ===
NBC Sports covered the race on the television side. Rick Allen, Jeff Burton, and Steve Letarte called the race in the booth. Dave Burns, Parker Kligerman, Marty Snider, and Kelli Stavast reported from pit lane during the race.

NBCSN
Booth announcers	Pit reporters
Lap-by-lap: Rick Allen; Color-commentator: Jeff Burton; Color-commentator: Steve Letarte	Dave Burns; Parker Kligerman; Marty Snider; Kelli Stavast

=== Radio ===
Motor Racing Network had the radio call for the race, which was simulcast on Sirius XM NASCAR Radio.

MRN
Booth announcers	Turn announcers	Pit reporters
Lead announcer: Joe Moore; Announcer: Jeff Striegle; Announcer: Rusty Wallace	Turns 1 & 2: Dave Moody; Turns 3 & 4: Mike Bagley	Alex Hayden; Winston Kelley; Steve Post

== Standings after the race ==
Drivers' Championship standings

	Pos	Driver	Points
	1	Martin Truex Jr.	4,069
7	2	Kyle Busch	4,042 (–27)
1	3	Brad Keselowski	4,026 (–43)
	4	Kevin Harvick	4,017 (–52)
3	5	Jimmie Johnson	4,017 (–52)
1	6	Denny Hamlin	4,014 (–55)
	7	Ryan Blaney	4,009 (–60)
2	8	Chase Elliott	4,006 (–63)
7	9	Kyle Larson	2,236 (–1,833)
	10	Matt Kenseth	2,184 (–1,885)
1	11	Jamie McMurray	2,138 (–1,931)
1	12	Kasey Kahne	2,126 (–1,943)
3	13	Kurt Busch	2,124 (–1,945)
1	14	Austin Dillon	2,122 (–1,947)
4	15	Ricky Stenhouse Jr.	2,119 (–1,950)
1	16	Ryan Newman	2,107 (–1,962)
Official driver's standings

Manufacturers' Championship standings

Pos	Manufacturer	Points
1	Toyota	1,137
2	Chevrolet	1,123 (–14)
3	Ford	1,116 (–21)
Official manufacturers' standings

- Note: Only the first 16 positions are included for the driver standings.

Previous race: 2017 Alabama 500	Monster Energy NASCAR Cup Series; 2017 season	Next race: 2017 First Data 500
