= 2017 Bank of America 500 =

Race details
- Race 30 of 36 in the 2017 Monster Energy NASCAR Cup Series
- The 2017 Bank of America 500 program cover, featuring a tribute to Dale Earnhardt Jr. Artwork was made by former NASCAR artist Sam Bass. "Dreams"
- Date: October 8, 2017
- Location: Charlotte Motor Speedway in Concord, North Carolina
- Course: Permanent racing facility
- Course length: 1.5 miles (2.414 km)
- Distance: 337 laps, 505.5 mi (813.523 km)
- Scheduled distance: 334 laps, 501 mi (806.281 km)
- Average speed: 139.128 miles per hour (223.905 km/h)

Pole position
Driver	Denny Hamlin	Joe Gibbs Racing
- Time: 28.184

Most laps led
Driver	Kevin Harvick	Stewart–Haas Racing
- Laps: 149

Winner
No. 78	Martin Truex Jr.	Furniture Row Racing

Television in the United States
- Network: NBC
- Announcers: Rick Allen, Dale Jarrett, Jeff Burton and Steve Letarte

Radio in the United States
- Radio: PRN
- Booth announcers: Doug Rice, Mark Garrow and Wendy Venturini
- Turn announcers: Rob Albright (1 & 2) and Pat Patterson (3 & 4)

The 2017 Bank of America 500 was a Monster Energy NASCAR Cup Series race held on October 8, 2017, at Charlotte Motor Speedway in Concord, North Carolina. Contested over 337 laps, extended from 334 laps due to an overtime finish on the 1.5 miles (2.4 km) intermediate speedway, it was the 30th race of the 2017 Monster Energy NASCAR Cup Series season, the fourth race of the Playoffs, and the first race of the Round of 12.

Furniture Row Racing's Martin Truex Jr. won his sixth race of the season, leading the final 57 laps of the race to progress to the Round of 8.

== Entry list ==
No.	Driver	Team	Manufacturer
1	Jamie McMurray	Chip Ganassi Racing	Chevrolet
2	Brad Keselowski	Team Penske	Ford
3	Austin Dillon	Richard Childress Racing	Chevrolet
4	Kevin Harvick	Stewart–Haas Racing	Ford
5	Kasey Kahne	Hendrick Motorsports	Chevrolet
6	Trevor Bayne	Roush Fenway Racing	Ford
10	Danica Patrick	Stewart–Haas Racing	Ford
11	Denny Hamlin	Joe Gibbs Racing	Toyota
13	Ty Dillon (R)	Germain Racing	Chevrolet
14	Clint Bowyer	Stewart–Haas Racing	Ford
15	Reed Sorenson	Premium Motorsports	Chevrolet
17	Ricky Stenhouse Jr.	Roush Fenway Racing	Ford
18	Kyle Busch	Joe Gibbs Racing	Toyota
19	Daniel Suárez (R)	Joe Gibbs Racing	Toyota
20	Matt Kenseth	Joe Gibbs Racing	Toyota
21	Ryan Blaney	Wood Brothers Racing	Ford
22	Joey Logano	Team Penske	Ford
23	Corey LaJoie (R)	BK Racing	Toyota
24	Chase Elliott	Hendrick Motorsports	Chevrolet
27	Paul Menard	Richard Childress Racing	Chevrolet
31	Ryan Newman	Richard Childress Racing	Chevrolet
32	Matt DiBenedetto	Go Fas Racing	Ford
33	Jeffrey Earnhardt	Circle Sport – The Motorsports Group	Chevrolet
34	Landon Cassill	Front Row Motorsports	Ford
37	Chris Buescher	JTG Daugherty Racing	Chevrolet
38	David Ragan	Front Row Motorsports	Ford
41	Kurt Busch	Stewart–Haas Racing	Ford
42	Kyle Larson	Chip Ganassi Racing	Chevrolet
43	Aric Almirola	Richard Petty Motorsports	Ford
47	A. J. Allmendinger	JTG Daugherty Racing	Chevrolet
48	Jimmie Johnson	Hendrick Motorsports	Chevrolet
51	B. J. McLeod (i)	Rick Ware Racing	Chevrolet
55	Gray Gaulding (R)	Premium Motorsports	Toyota
66	Timmy Hill (i)	MBM Motorsports	Chevrolet
72	Cole Whitt	TriStar Motorsports	Chevrolet
77	Erik Jones (R)	Furniture Row Racing	Toyota
78	Martin Truex Jr.	Furniture Row Racing	Toyota
83	Brett Moffitt (i)	BK Racing	Toyota
88	Dale Earnhardt Jr.	Hendrick Motorsports	Chevrolet
95	Michael McDowell	Leavine Family Racing	Chevrolet
Official entry list

== Practice ==
=== First practice ===
Kyle Larson was the fastest in the first practice session with a time of 28.113 seconds and a speed of 192.082 mph (309.126 km/h).

Pos	No.	Driver	Team	Manufacturer	Time	Speed
1	42	Kyle Larson	Chip Ganassi Racing	Chevrolet	28.113	192.082
2	31	Ryan Newman	Richard Childress Racing	Chevrolet	28.207	191.442
3	4	Kevin Harvick	Stewart–Haas Racing	Ford	28.239	191.225
Official first practice results

== Qualifying ==
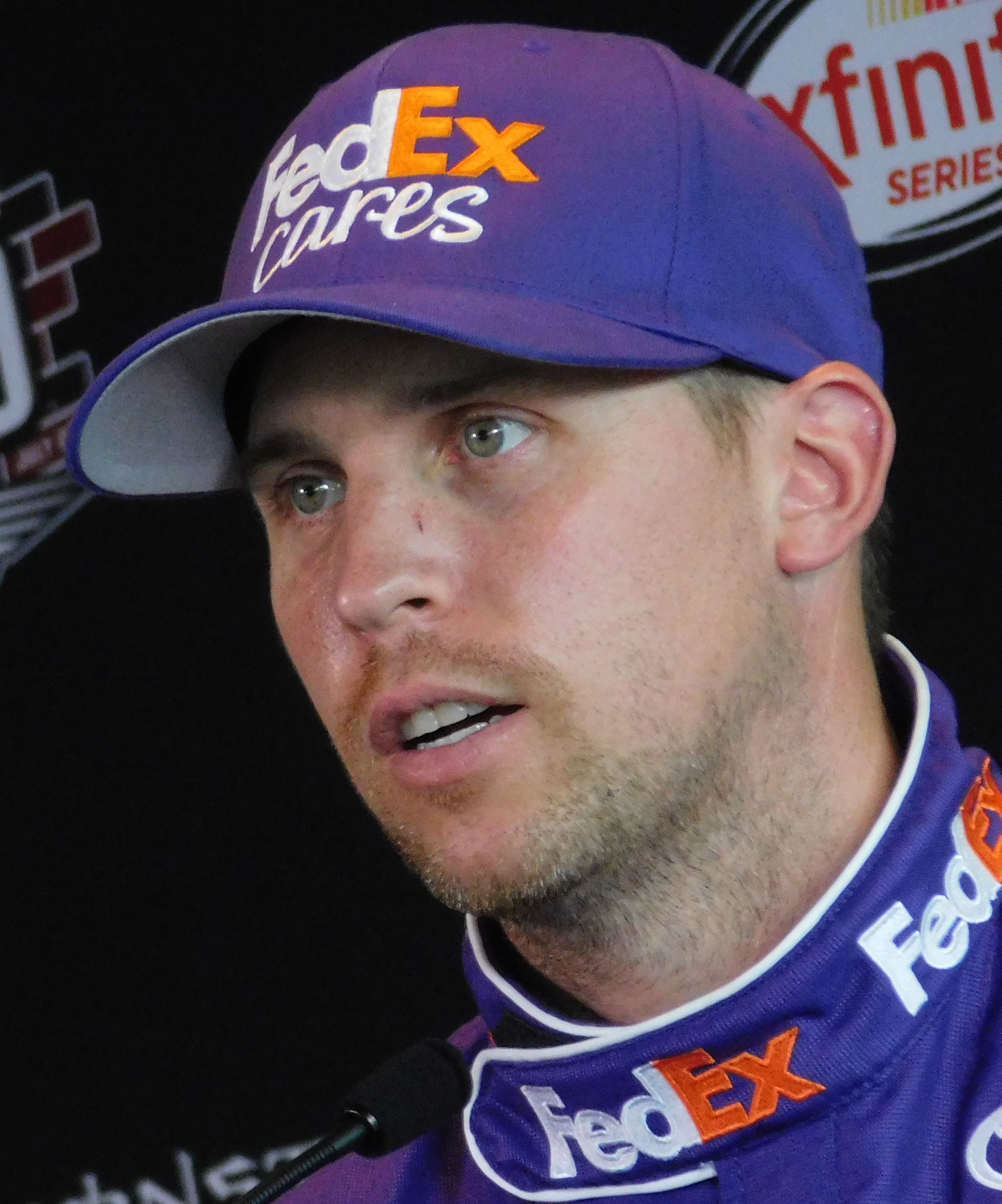
Denny Hamlin scored the pole position.

Denny Hamlin scored the pole for the race with a time of 28.184 and a speed of 191.598 mph (308.347 km/h).

=== Qualifying results ===
Pos	No.	Driver	Team	Manufacturer	R1	R2	R3
1	11	Denny Hamlin	Joe Gibbs Racing	Toyota	28.306	28.205	28.184
2	20	Matt Kenseth	Joe Gibbs Racing	Toyota	28.312	28.241	28.200
3	4	Kevin Harvick	Stewart–Haas Racing	Ford	28.039	28.133	28.214
4	18	Kyle Busch	Joe Gibbs Racing	Toyota	28.345	28.334	28.281
5	14	Clint Bowyer	Stewart–Haas Racing	Ford	28.135	28.202	28.334
6	2	Brad Keselowski	Team Penske	Ford	28.355	28.336	28.338
7	24	Chase Elliott	Hendrick Motorsports	Chevrolet	28.235	28.306	28.360
8	41	Kurt Busch	Stewart–Haas Racing	Ford	28.243	28.271	28.367
9	5	Kasey Kahne	Hendrick Motorsports	Chevrolet	28.341	28.294	28.388
10	42	Kyle Larson	Chip Ganassi Racing	Chevrolet	28.384	28.273	28.411
11	31	Ryan Newman	Richard Childress Racing	Chevrolet	28.186	28.421	28.449
12	10	Danica Patrick	Stewart–Haas Racing	Ford	28.399	28.392	28.539
13	3	Austin Dillon	Richard Childress Racing	Chevrolet	28.439	28.421	—
14	19	Daniel Suárez (R)	Joe Gibbs Racing	Toyota	28.210	28.449	—
15	21	Ryan Blaney	Wood Brothers Racing	Ford	28.216	28.465	—
16	95	Michael McDowell	Leavine Family Racing	Chevrolet	28.218	28.484	—
17	78	Martin Truex Jr.	Furniture Row Racing	Toyota	28.503	28.496	—
18	1	Jamie McMurray	Chip Ganassi Racing	Chevrolet	28.232	28.540	—
19	47	A. J. Allmendinger	JTG Daugherty Racing	Chevrolet	28.396	28.541	—
20	27	Paul Menard	Richard Childress Racing	Chevrolet	28.425	28.546	—
21	37	Chris Buescher	JTG Daugherty Racing	Chevrolet	28.293	28.586	—
22	17	Ricky Stenhouse Jr.	Roush Fenway Racing	Ford	28.520	28.812	—
23	88	Dale Earnhardt Jr.	Hendrick Motorsports	Chevrolet	28.379	28.833	—
24	43	Aric Almirola	Richard Petty Motorsports	Ford	28.423	29.088	—
25	48	Jimmie Johnson	Hendrick Motorsports	Chevrolet	28.538	—	—
26	6	Trevor Bayne	Roush Fenway Racing	Ford	28.572	—	—
27	13	Ty Dillon (R)	Germain Racing	Chevrolet	28.661	—	—
28	22	Joey Logano	Team Penske	Ford	28.765	—	—
29	32	Matt DiBenedetto	Go Fas Racing	Ford	28.843	—	—
30	34	Landon Cassill	Front Row Motorsports	Ford	28.871	—	—
31	38	David Ragan	Front Row Motorsports	Ford	28.900	—	—
32	72	Cole Whitt	TriStar Motorsports	Chevrolet	28.986	—	—
33	51	B. J. McLeod (i)	Rick Ware Racing	Chevrolet	29.286	—	—
34	15	Reed Sorenson	Premium Motorsports	Chevrolet	29.327	—	—
35	55	Gray Gaulding (R)	Premium Motorsports	Toyota	29.501	—	—
36	66	Timmy Hill (i)	MBM Motorsports	Chevrolet	29.602	—	—
37	33	Jeffrey Earnhardt	Circle Sport – The Motorsports Group	Chevrolet	29.807	—	—
38	77	Erik Jones (R)	Furniture Row Racing	Toyota	0.000	—	—
39	23	Corey LaJoie (R)	BK Racing	Toyota	0.000	—	—
40	83	Brett Moffitt (i)	BK Racing	Toyota	0.000	—	—
Official qualifying results

== Race ==
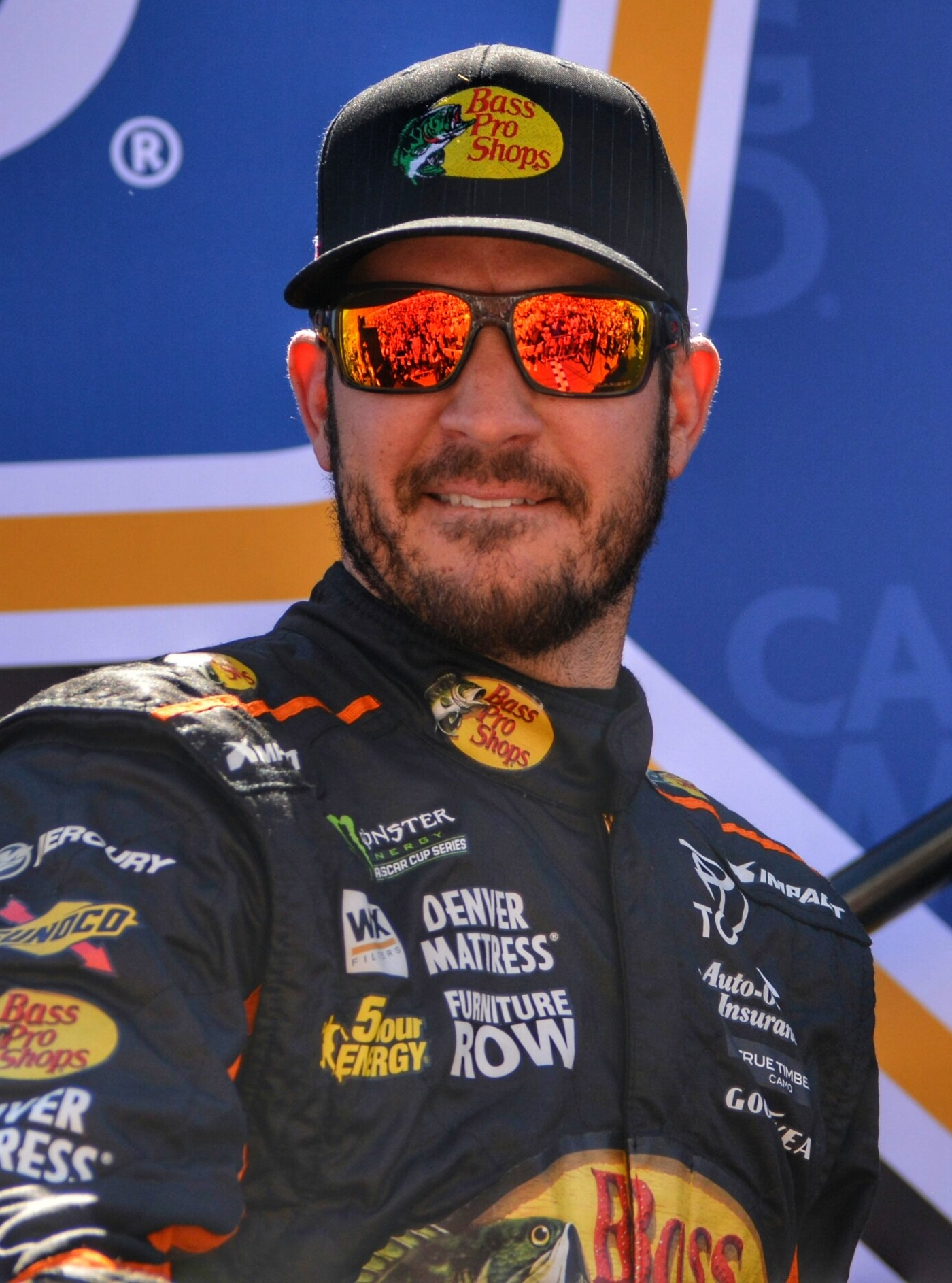
Martin Truex Jr. won the race.

=== Race results ===
==== Stage results ====
Stage 1 Laps: 90

Pos	No	Driver	Team	Manufacturer	Points
1	4	Kevin Harvick	Stewart–Haas Racing	Ford	10
2	24	Chase Elliott	Hendrick Motorsports	Chevrolet	9
3	1	Jamie McMurray	Chip Ganassi Racing	Chevrolet	8
4	42	Kyle Larson	Chip Ganassi Racing	Chevrolet	7
5	18	Kyle Busch	Joe Gibbs Racing	Toyota	6
6	11	Denny Hamlin	Joe Gibbs Racing	Toyota	5
7	20	Matt Kenseth	Joe Gibbs Racing	Toyota	4
8	41	Kurt Busch	Stewart–Haas Racing	Ford	3
9	19	Daniel Suárez (R)	Joe Gibbs Racing	Toyota	2
10	48	Jimmie Johnson	Hendrick Motorsports	Chevrolet	1
Official stage one results

Stage 2 Laps: 90

Pos	No	Driver	Team	Manufacturer	Points
1	4	Kevin Harvick	Stewart–Haas Racing	Ford	10
2	24	Chase Elliott	Hendrick Motorsports	Chevrolet	9
3	20	Matt Kenseth	Joe Gibbs Racing	Toyota	8
4	78	Martin Truex Jr.	Furniture Row Racing	Toyota	7
5	41	Kurt Busch	Stewart–Haas Racing	Ford	6
6	11	Denny Hamlin	Joe Gibbs Racing	Toyota	5
7	42	Kyle Larson	Chip Ganassi Racing	Chevrolet	4
8	48	Jimmie Johnson	Hendrick Motorsports	Chevrolet	3
9	21	Ryan Blaney	Wood Brothers Racing	Ford	2
10	1	Jamie McMurray	Chip Ganassi Racing	Chevrolet	1
Official stage two results

=== Final stage results ===
Stage 3 Laps: 154

Pos	Grid	No	Driver	Team	Manufacturer	Laps	Points
1	17	78	Martin Truex Jr.	Furniture Row Racing	Toyota	337	47
2	7	24	Chase Elliott	Hendrick Motorsports	Chevrolet	337	53
3	3	4	Kevin Harvick	Stewart–Haas Racing	Ford	337	54
4	1	11	Denny Hamlin	Joe Gibbs Racing	Toyota	337	43
5	18	1	Jamie McMurray	Chip Ganassi Racing	Chevrolet	337	41
6	14	19	Daniel Suárez (R)	Joe Gibbs Racing	Toyota	337	33
7	25	48	Jimmie Johnson	Hendrick Motorsports	Chevrolet	337	34
8	15	21	Ryan Blaney	Wood Brothers Racing	Ford	337	31
9	9	5	Kasey Kahne	Hendrick Motorsports	Chevrolet	337	28
10	10	42	Kyle Larson	Chip Ganassi Racing	Chevrolet	337	38
11	2	20	Matt Kenseth	Joe Gibbs Racing	Toyota	337	38
12	23	88	Dale Earnhardt Jr.	Hendrick Motorsports	Chevrolet	337	25
13	22	17	Ricky Stenhouse Jr.	Roush Fenway Racing	Ford	337	24
14	26	6	Trevor Bayne	Roush Fenway Racing	Ford	337	23
15	6	2	Brad Keselowski	Team Penske	Ford	337	22
16	13	3	Austin Dillon	Richard Childress Racing	Chevrolet	337	21
17	38	77	Erik Jones (R)	Furniture Row Racing	Toyota	337	20
18	21	37	Chris Buescher	JTG Daugherty Racing	Chevrolet	337	19
19	20	27	Paul Menard	Richard Childress Racing	Chevrolet	337	18
20	19	47	A. J. Allmendinger	JTG Daugherty Racing	Chevrolet	337	17
21	27	13	Ty Dillon (R)	Germain Racing	Chevrolet	337	16
22	8	41	Kurt Busch	Stewart–Haas Racing	Ford	337	24
23	29	32	Matt DiBenedetto	Go Fas Racing	Ford	337	14
24	24	43	Aric Almirola	Richard Petty Motorsports	Ford	337	13
25	30	34	Landon Cassill	Front Row Motorsports	Ford	336	12
26	28	22	Joey Logano	Team Penske	Ford	335	11
27	5	14	Clint Bowyer	Stewart–Haas Racing	Ford	335	10
28	39	23	Corey LaJoie (R)	BK Racing	Toyota	333	9
29	4	18	Kyle Busch	Joe Gibbs Racing	Toyota	331	14
30	37	33	Jeffrey Earnhardt	Circle Sport – The Motorsports Group	Chevrolet	330	7
31	34	15	Reed Sorenson	Premium Motorsports	Chevrolet	330	6
32	33	51	B. J. McLeod (i)	Rick Ware Racing	Chevrolet	326	0
33	36	66	Timmy Hill (i)	MBM Motorsports	Chevrolet	326	0
34	32	72	Cole Whitt	TriStar Motorsports	Chevrolet	295	3
35	16	95	Michael McDowell	Leavine Family Racing	Chevrolet	293	2
36	35	55	Gray Gaulding (R)	Premium Motorsports	Toyota	267	1
37	31	38	David Ragan	Front Row Motorsports	Ford	263	1
38	12	10	Danica Patrick	Stewart–Haas Racing	Ford	263	1
39	40	83	Brett Moffitt (i)	BK Racing	Toyota	89	0
40	11	31	Ryan Newman	Richard Childress Racing	Chevrolet	43	1
Official race results

=== Race statistics ===
- Lead changes: 14 among 8 different drivers
- Cautions/Laps: 10 for 44 laps
- Red flags: 0
- Time of race: 3 hours, 38 minutes
- Average speed: 139.128 miles per hour (223.905 km/h)

== Media ==
=== Television ===
NBC Sports covered the race on the television side. Rick Allen and Dale Jarrett called the race from the regular booth. Jeff Burton and Steve Letarte called the race from NBC's Stock Car Smarts Booth. Dave Burns, Parker Kligerman, Marty Snider, and Kelli Stavast reported from pit lane during the race.

NBC
Booth announcers	Pit reporters
Lap-by-lap: Rick Allen; Color commentator Dale Jarrett; Stock Car Smarts Booth analyst: Jeff Burton; Stock Car Smarts Booth analyst: Steve Letarte	Dave Burns; Parker Kligerman; Marty Snider; Kelli Stavast

=== Radio ===
The Performance Racing Network had the radio call for the race, which was simulcast on SiriusXM's NASCAR Radio channel.

PRN
Booth announcers	Turn announcers	Pit reporters
Lead announcer: Doug Rice; Announcer: Mark Garrow; Announcer: Wendy Venturini	Turns 1 & 2: Rob Albright; Turns 3 & 4: Pat Patterson	Brad Gillie; Brett McMillan; Jim Noble; Steve Richards

== Standings after the race ==
Drivers' Championship standings

	Pos	Driver	Points
	1	Martin Truex Jr.	3,106
1	2	Kyle Larson	3,072 (–34)
3	3	Kevin Harvick	3,069 (–37)
6	4	Chase Elliott	3,059 (–47)
2	5	Denny Hamlin	3,056 (–50)
4	6	Kyle Busch	3,055 (–51)
2	7	Jimmie Johnson	3,051 (–55)
4	8	Jamie McMurray	3,044 (–62)
2	9	Matt Kenseth	3,043 (–63)
6	10	Brad Keselowski	3,042 (–64)
2	11	Ryan Blaney	3,039 (–67)
4	12	Ricky Stenhouse Jr.	3,034 (–72)
1	13	Austin Dillon	2,086 (–1,020)
1	14	Kasey Kahne	2,074 (–1,032)
1	15	Kurt Busch	2,068 (–1,038)
3	16	Ryan Newman	2,068 (–1,038)
Official driver's standings

Manufacturers' Championship standings

Pos	Manufacturer	Points
1	Toyota	1,066
2	Chevrolet	1,055 (–11)
3	Ford	1,041 (–25)
Official manufacturers' standings

- Note: Only the first 16 positions are included for the driver standings.

Previous race: 2017 Apache Warrior 400	Monster Energy NASCAR Cup Series; 2017 season	Next race: 2017 Alabama 500
