= Kyle Strickler =

American racing driver (born 1983)

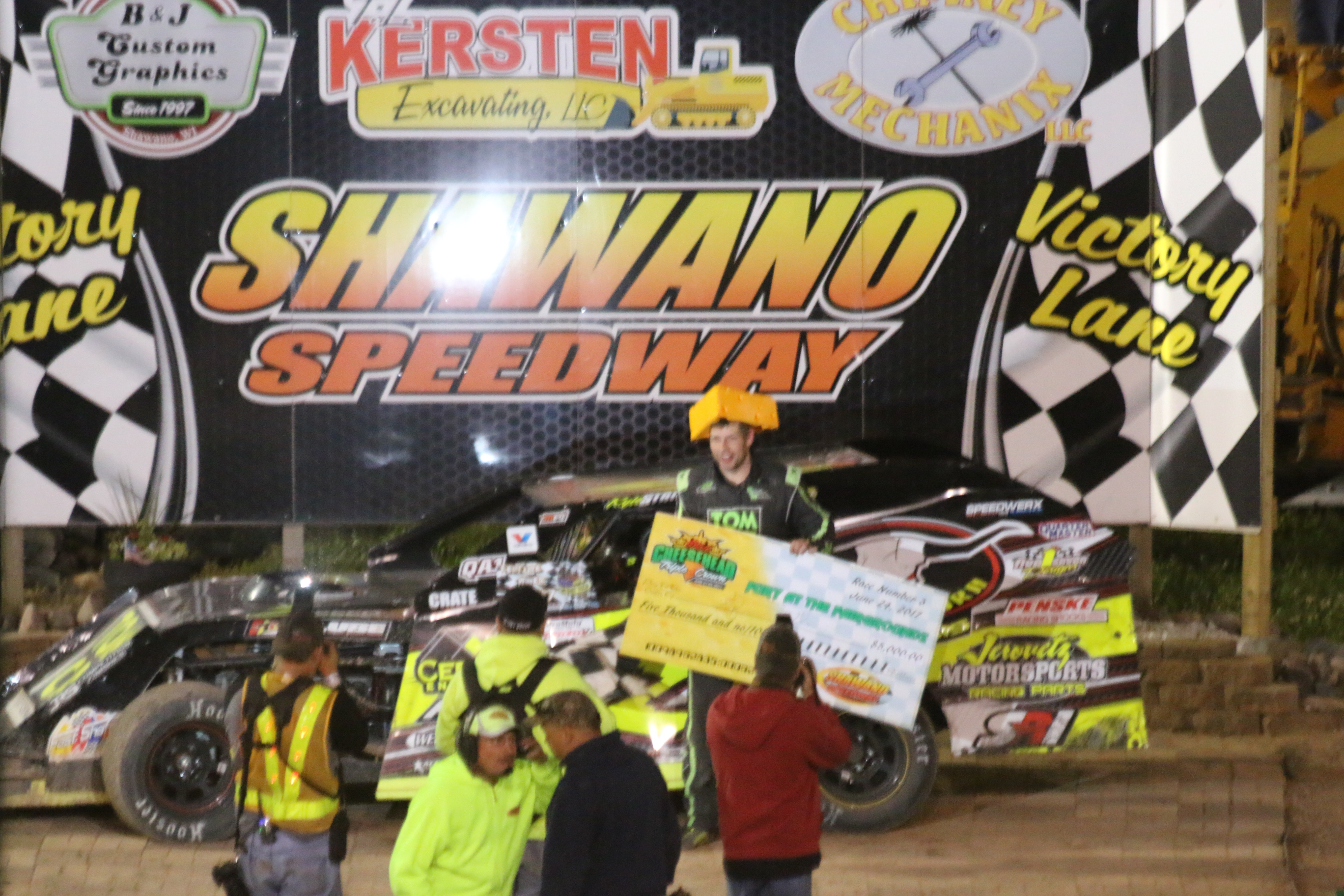
- Strickler in 2017 after winning in his IMCA Modified car
- Born: Kyle C. Strickler; August 3, 1983 (age 43); Mooresville, North Carolina, U.S.
- Achievements: 2023 DIRTcar Nationals UMP Modified Champion; 2021 DIRTcar Sunshine Nationals UMP Modified Champion; 2024, 2025 DIRTcar UMP Modified Florida Speedweeks Champion; 2014 East Bay Winter Nationals UMP Modified Champion; 2025 Wild West Shootout UMP Modified Champion; 2017 Cheesehead Triple Crown Series Champion; 2012, 2013 Harris Clash Winner

NASCAR FedEx Freight Truck Series career
- 3 races run over 3 years
- 2021 position: 75th
- Best finish: 63rd (2019)
- First race: 2018 Eldora Dirt Derby (Eldora)
- Last race: 2021 Corn Belt 150 (Knoxville)
Wins	Top tens	Poles
0	0	0
- Statistics up to date as of December 30, 2021.

Kyle C. Strickler (born August 3, 1983), nicknamed "the High Side Tickler", is an American professional racing driver who competes in dirt late models and modified cars. He previously competed part-time in the NASCAR Camping World Truck Series, driving the No. 20 Chevrolet Silverado for Young's Motorsports.

== Racing career ==
=== Dirt track racing ===
==== Dirt modifieds ====
Strickler has been racing in the DIRTcar UMP modified dirt car series since 2014. He won the first two runnings of the modified portion of the Dirt Short Track Classic at Charlotte Motor Speedway, and won the event for a third time in 2020. Strickler usually drives a No. 8 modified car, usually for his own self-owned team.

==== Dirt late models ====
In 2019, Strickler began racing late models for Wells Motorsports. In early September 2020, he raced against an invitation-only field of top late model drivers at Eldora Speedway for $50,000-to-win. He led 65 of 67 laps but cut a tire while leading on the final lap. Later that month, he scored his first major late model victory in the Lucas Oil Late Model Dirt Series race at I-80 Speedway.

For the 2021 racing season, Strickler signed to run full-time on the Lucas Oil Late Model Dirt Series for PCC Motorsports. In January 2021, he scored his first victory on the World of Outlaws Late Model Series, winning the Sunshine Nationals finale at Volusia Speedway Park.

=== NASCAR ===
Strickler began his NASCAR career at the 2018 Eldora Dirt Derby; he drove for MB Motorsports, starting 23rd and finishing 31st due to a crash. The following year, he returned to the Truck Series' Eldora race with DGR-Crosley, finishing 18th. Strickler returned to the Truck Series in 2021 to drive in the new race at the Knoxville dirt track (which replaced Eldora on the schedule) as a last-minute replacement for Spencer Boyd in the No. 20 for Young's Motorsports.

== Personal life ==
Strickler was born in Sinking Spring, Pennsylvania and moved to North Carolina in 2006 to further his racing career, where he lives with his wife and two children. When not racing, he worked for former NASCAR teams Rusty Wallace Racing and Robby Gordon Motorsports.

== Motorsports career results ==
=== NASCAR ===
(key) (Bold – Pole position awarded by qualifying time. Italics – Pole position earned by points standings or practice time. * – Most laps led.)

==== Camping World Truck Series ====
NASCAR Camping World Truck Series results
Year	Team	No.	Make	1	2	3	4	5	6	7	8	9	10	11	12	13	14	15	16	17	18	19	20	21	22	23	NCWTC	Pts	Ref
2018	MB Motorsports	63	Chevy	DAY	ATL	LVS	MAR	DOV	KAN	CLT	TEX	IOW	GTW	CHI	KEN	ELD; 31	POC	MCH	BRI	MSP	LVS	TAL	MAR	TEX	PHO	HOM	87th	6	
2019	DGR-Crosley	54	Toyota	DAY	ATL	LVS	MAR	TEX	DOV	KAN	CLT	TEX	IOW	GTW	CHI	KEN	POC	ELD; 18	MCH	BRI	MSP	LVS	TAL	MAR	PHO	HOM	63rd	27	
2021	Young's Motorsports	20	Chevy	DAY	DAY	LVS	ATL	BRI	RCH	KAN	DAR	COA	CLT	TEX	NSH	POC	KNX; 23	GLN	GTW	DAR	BRI	LVS	TAL	MAR	PHO		75th	14	

^{*} Season still in progress
