= 2017 Alabama 500 =

Race details
- Race 31 of 36 in the 2017 Monster Energy NASCAR Cup Series
- Date: October 15, 2017
- Location: Talladega Superspeedway in Lincoln, Alabama
- Course: Permanent racing facility
- Course length: 2.66 miles (4.28 km)
- Distance: 188 laps, 500.08 mi (804.64 km)
- Average speed: 131.677 miles per hour (211.914 km/h)

Pole position
Driver	Dale Earnhardt Jr.	Hendrick Motorsports
- Time: 50.256

Most laps led
Driver	Joey Logano	Team Penske
- Laps: 59

Winner
No. 2	Brad Keselowski	Team Penske

Television in the United States
- Network: NBC
- Announcers: Rick Allen, Jeff Burton and Steve Letarte

Radio in the United States
- Radio: MRN
- Booth announcers: Joe Moore, Jeff Striegle and Rusty Wallace
- Turn announcers: Dave Moody (1 & 2), Mike Bagley (Backstretch) and Dillon Welch (3 & 4)

The 2017 Alabama 500 was a Monster Energy NASCAR Cup Series race held on October 15, 2017, at Talladega Superspeedway in Lincoln, Alabama. Contested over 188 laps on the 2.66 miles (4.28 km) superspeedway, it was the 31st race of the 2017 Monster Energy NASCAR Cup Series season, the fifth race of the Playoffs, and the second race of the Round of 12. Brad Keselowski won the first stage and the race, and Ryan Blaney won the second stage.

== Entry list ==
No.	Driver	Team	Manufacturer
1	Jamie McMurray	Chip Ganassi Racing	Chevrolet
2	Brad Keselowski	Team Penske	Ford
3	Austin Dillon	Richard Childress Racing	Chevrolet
4	Kevin Harvick	Stewart–Haas Racing	Ford
5	Kasey Kahne	Hendrick Motorsports	Chevrolet
6	Trevor Bayne	Roush Fenway Racing	Ford
7	Justin Marks (i)	Premium Motorsports	Chevrolet
10	Danica Patrick	Stewart–Haas Racing	Ford
11	Denny Hamlin	Joe Gibbs Racing	Toyota
13	Ty Dillon (R)	Germain Racing	Chevrolet
14	Clint Bowyer	Stewart–Haas Racing	Ford
15	Mark Thompson (i)	Premium Motorsports	Chevrolet
17	Ricky Stenhouse Jr.	Roush Fenway Racing	Ford
18	Kyle Busch	Joe Gibbs Racing	Toyota
19	Daniel Suárez (R)	Joe Gibbs Racing	Toyota
20	Matt Kenseth	Joe Gibbs Racing	Toyota
21	Ryan Blaney	Wood Brothers Racing	Ford
22	Joey Logano	Team Penske	Ford
23	Joey Gase (i)	BK Racing	Toyota
24	Chase Elliott	Hendrick Motorsports	Chevrolet
27	Paul Menard	Richard Childress Racing	Chevrolet
31	Ryan Newman	Richard Childress Racing	Chevrolet
32	Matt DiBenedetto	Go Fas Racing	Ford
33	Jeffrey Earnhardt	Circle Sport – The Motorsports Group	Chevrolet
34	Landon Cassill	Front Row Motorsports	Ford
37	Chris Buescher	JTG Daugherty Racing	Chevrolet
38	David Ragan	Front Row Motorsports	Ford
41	Kurt Busch	Stewart–Haas Racing	Ford
42	Kyle Larson	Chip Ganassi Racing	Chevrolet
43	Aric Almirola	Richard Petty Motorsports	Ford
47	A. J. Allmendinger	JTG Daugherty Racing	Chevrolet
48	Jimmie Johnson	Hendrick Motorsports	Chevrolet
55	D. J. Kennington	Premium Motorsports	Toyota
72	Cole Whitt	TriStar Motorsports	Chevrolet
75	Brendan Gaughan (i)	Beard Motorsports	Chevrolet
77	Erik Jones (R)	Furniture Row Racing	Toyota
78	Martin Truex Jr.	Furniture Row Racing	Toyota
83	Gray Gaulding (R)	BK Racing	Toyota
88	Dale Earnhardt Jr.	Hendrick Motorsports	Chevrolet
95	Michael McDowell	Leavine Family Racing	Chevrolet
Official entry list

== Practice ==
=== First practice ===
Brad Keselowski was the fastest in the first practice session with a time of 48.398 seconds and a speed of 197.859 mph (318.423 km/h). During practice, Jimmie Johnson spun in turn 4 after cutting down a left-rear tire from debris.

Pos	No.	Driver	Team	Manufacturer	Time	Speed
1	2	Brad Keselowski	Team Penske	Ford	48.398	197.859
2	41	Kurt Busch	Stewart–Haas Racing	Ford	48.411	197.806
3	21	Ryan Blaney	Wood Brothers Racing	Ford	48.413	197.798
Official first practice results

=== Final practice ===
Kasey Kahne was the fastest in the final practice session with a time of 50.078 seconds and a speed of 191.222 mph (307.742 km/h).

Pos	No.	Driver	Team	Manufacturer	Time	Speed
1	5	Kasey Kahne	Hendrick Motorsports	Chevrolet	50.078	191.222
2	88	Dale Earnhardt Jr.	Hendrick Motorsports	Chevrolet	50.118	191.069
3	41	Kurt Busch	Stewart–Haas Racing	Ford	50.332	190.257
Official final practice results

== Qualifying ==
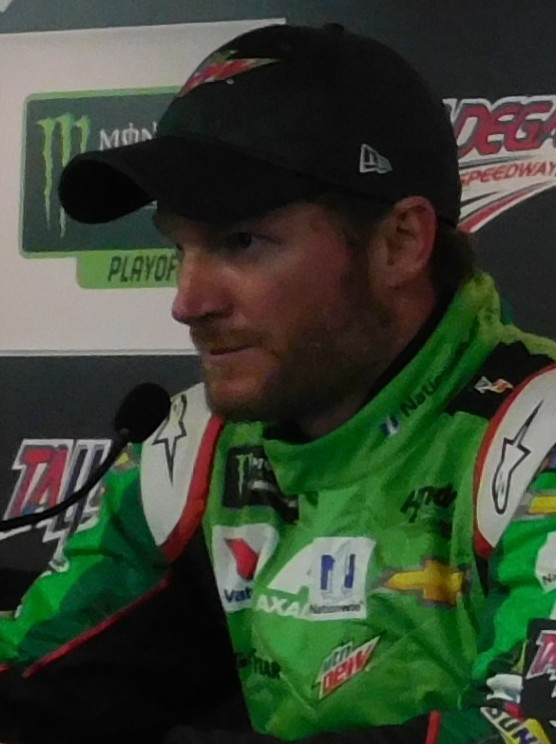
Dale Earnhardt Jr. scored the pole position.

Dale Earnhardt Jr. scored the pole for the race with a time of 50.256 and a speed of 190.544 mph (306.651 km/h).

=== Qualifying results ===
Pos	No.	Driver	Team	Manufacturer	R1	R2
1	88	Dale Earnhardt Jr.	Hendrick Motorsports	Chevrolet	50.299	50.256
2	24	Chase Elliott	Hendrick Motorsports	Chevrolet	50.356	50.291
3	22	Joey Logano	Team Penske	Ford	50.354	50.301
4	41	Kurt Busch	Stewart–Haas Racing	Ford	50.376	50.329
5	17	Ricky Stenhouse Jr.	Roush Fenway Racing	Ford	50.447	50.355
6	2	Brad Keselowski	Team Penske	Ford	50.410	50.360
7	14	Clint Bowyer	Stewart–Haas Racing	Ford	50.461	50.459
8	48	Jimmie Johnson	Hendrick Motorsports	Chevrolet	50.514	50.460
9	21	Ryan Blaney	Wood Brothers Racing	Ford	50.486	50.488
10	6	Trevor Bayne	Roush Fenway Racing	Ford	50.501	50.491
11	5	Kasey Kahne	Hendrick Motorsports	Chevrolet	50.570	50.501
12	42	Kyle Larson	Chip Ganassi Racing	Chevrolet	50.621	50.602
13	10	Danica Patrick	Stewart–Haas Racing	Ford	50.640	—
14	19	Daniel Suárez (R)	Joe Gibbs Racing	Toyota	50.678	—
15	11	Denny Hamlin	Joe Gibbs Racing	Toyota	50.715	—
16	18	Kyle Busch	Joe Gibbs Racing	Toyota	50.725	—
17	1	Jamie McMurray	Chip Ganassi Racing	Chevrolet	50.725	—
18	3	Austin Dillon	Richard Childress Racing	Chevrolet	50.746	—
19	20	Matt Kenseth	Joe Gibbs Racing	Toyota	50.757	—
20	27	Paul Menard	Richard Childress Racing	Chevrolet	50.767	—
21	78	Martin Truex Jr.	Furniture Row Racing	Toyota	50.788	—
22	4	Kevin Harvick	Stewart–Haas Racing	Ford	50.828	—
23	77	Erik Jones (R)	Furniture Row Racing	Toyota	50.863	—
24	47	A. J. Allmendinger	JTG Daugherty Racing	Chevrolet	50.875	—
25	13	Ty Dillon (R)	Germain Racing	Chevrolet	50.877	—
26	43	Aric Almirola	Richard Petty Motorsports	Ford	50.932	—
27	31	Ryan Newman	Richard Childress Racing	Chevrolet	50.957	—
28	37	Chris Buescher	JTG Daugherty Racing	Chevrolet	50.966	—
29	95	Michael McDowell	Leavine Family Racing	Chevrolet	51.040	—
30	34	Landon Cassill	Front Row Motorsports	Ford	51.098	—
31	7	Justin Marks (i)	Premium Motorsports	Chevrolet	51.101	—
32	32	Matt DiBenedetto	Go Fas Racing	Ford	51.168	—
33	38	David Ragan	Front Row Motorsports	Ford	51.321	—
34	33	Jeffrey Earnhardt	Circle Sport – The Motorsports Group	Chevrolet	51.434	—
35	75	Brendan Gaughan (i)	Beard Motorsports	Chevrolet	51.652	—
36	15	Mark Thompson (i)	Premium Motorsports	Chevrolet	51.787	—
37	23	Joey Gase (i)	BK Racing	Toyota	51.928	—
38	72	Cole Whitt	TriStar Motorsports	Chevrolet	51.935	—
39	83	Gray Gaulding (R)	BK Racing	Toyota	52.379	—
40	55	D. J. Kennington	Premium Motorsports	Toyota	52.484	—
Official qualifying results

== Race results ==
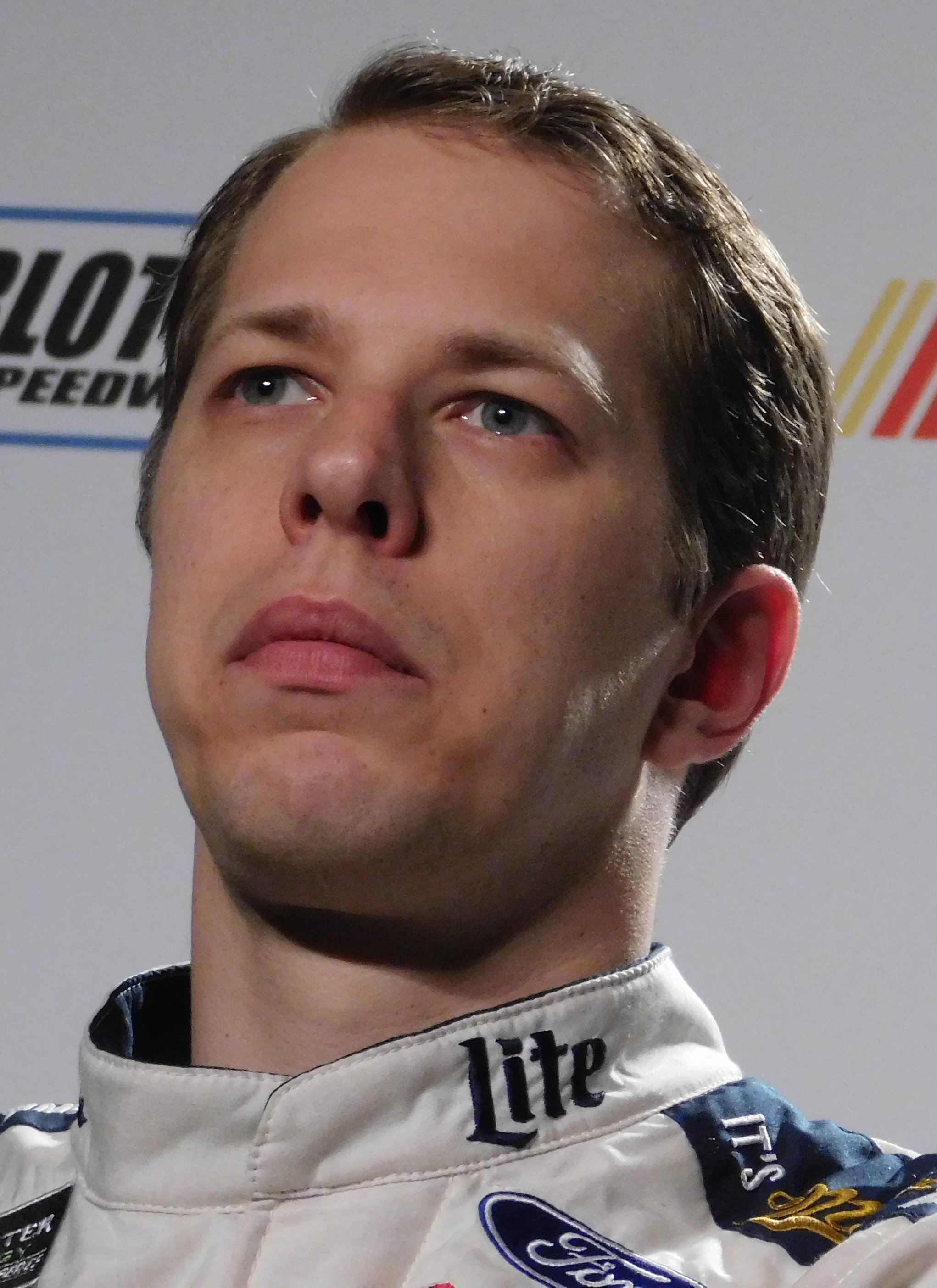
Brad Keselowski won the race.

=== Stage results ===
Stage 1 Laps: 55

Pos	No	Driver	Team	Manufacturer	Points
1	2	Brad Keselowski	Team Penske	Ford	10
2	22	Joey Logano	Team Penske	Ford	9
3	21	Ryan Blaney	Wood Brothers Racing	Ford	8
4	17	Ricky Stenhouse Jr.	Roush Fenway Racing	Ford	7
5	48	Jimmie Johnson	Hendrick Motorsports	Chevrolet	6
6	14	Clint Bowyer	Stewart–Haas Racing	Ford	5
7	95	Michael McDowell	Leavine Family Racing	Chevrolet	4
8	41	Kurt Busch	Stewart–Haas Racing	Ford	3
9	6	Trevor Bayne	Roush Fenway Racing	Ford	2
10	5	Kasey Kahne	Hendrick Motorsports	Chevrolet	1
Official stage one results

Stage 2 Laps: 55

Pos	No	Driver	Team	Manufacturer	Points
1	21	Ryan Blaney	Wood Brothers Racing	Ford	10
2	2	Brad Keselowski	Team Penske	Ford	9
3	14	Clint Bowyer	Stewart–Haas Racing	Ford	8
4	24	Chase Elliott	Hendrick Motorsports	Chevrolet	7
5	41	Kurt Busch	Stewart–Haas Racing	Ford	6
6	3	Austin Dillon	Richard Childress Racing	Chevrolet	5
7	48	Jimmie Johnson	Hendrick Motorsports	Chevrolet	4
8	4	Kevin Harvick	Stewart–Haas Racing	Ford	3
9	18	Kyle Busch	Joe Gibbs Racing	Toyota	2
10	11	Denny Hamlin	Joe Gibbs Racing	Toyota	1
Official stage two results

=== Final stage results ===
Stage 3 Laps: 78

Pos	Grid	No	Driver	Team	Manufacturer	Laps	Points
1	3	2	Brad Keselowski	Team Penske	Ford	188	59
2	27	31	Ryan Newman	Richard Childress Racing	Chevrolet	188	35
3	10	6	Trevor Bayne	Roush Fenway Racing	Ford	188	36
4	3	22	Joey Logano	Team Penske	Ford	188	42
5	26	43	Aric Almirola	Richard Petty Motorsports	Ford	188	32
6	15	11	Denny Hamlin	Joe Gibbs Racing	Toyota	188	32
7	1	88	Dale Earnhardt Jr.	Hendrick Motorsports	Chevrolet	188	30
8	11	5	Kasey Kahne	Hendrick Motorsports	Chevrolet	188	30
9	39	83	Gray Gaulding (R)	BK Racing	Toyota	188	28
10	33	38	David Ragan	Front Row Motorsports	Ford	188	27
11	25	13	Ty Dillon (R)	Germain Racing	Chevrolet	188	26
12	20	27	Paul Menard	Richard Childress Racing	Chevrolet	188	25
13	12	42	Kyle Larson	Chip Ganassi Racing	Chevrolet	188	24
14	19	20	Matt Kenseth	Joe Gibbs Racing	Toyota	187	23
15	14	19	Daniel Suárez (R)	Joe Gibbs Racing	Toyota	184	22
16	2	24	Chase Elliott	Hendrick Motorsports	Chevrolet	182	28
17	28	37	Chris Buescher	JTG Daugherty Racing	Chevrolet	182	20
18	9	21	Ryan Blaney	Wood Brothers Racing	Ford	177	37
19	35	75	Brendan Gaughan (i)	Beard Motorsports	Chevrolet	177	0
20	22	4	Kevin Harvick	Stewart–Haas Racing	Ford	176	20
21	13	10	Danica Patrick	Stewart–Haas Racing	Ford	175	16
22	24	47	A. J. Allmendinger	JTG Daugherty Racing	Chevrolet	172	15
23	21	78	Martin Truex Jr.	Furniture Row Racing	Toyota	171	14
24	8	48	Jimmie Johnson	Hendrick Motorsports	Chevrolet	171	23
25	4	41	Kurt Busch	Stewart–Haas Racing	Ford	171	21
26	5	17	Ricky Stenhouse Jr.	Roush Fenway Racing	Ford	171	18
27	16	18	Kyle Busch	Joe Gibbs Racing	Toyota	171	12
28	30	34	Landon Cassill	Front Row Motorsports	Ford	171	9
29	18	3	Austin Dillon	Richard Childress Racing	Chevrolet	171	13
30	29	95	Michael McDowell	Leavine Family Racing	Chevrolet	171	11
31	32	32	Matt DiBenedetto	Go Fas Racing	Ford	171	6
32	37	23	Joey Gase (i)	BK Racing	Toyota	164	0
33	40	55	D. J. Kennington	Premium Motorsports	Toyota	164	4
34	38	72	Cole Whitt	TriStar Motorsports	Chevrolet	155	3
35	7	14	Clint Bowyer	Stewart–Haas Racing	Ford	155	15
36	23	77	Erik Jones (R)	Furniture Row Racing	Toyota	26	1
37	17	1	Jamie McMurray	Chip Ganassi Racing	Chevrolet	25	1
38	34	33	Jeffrey Earnhardt	Circle Sport – The Motorsports Group	Chevrolet	25	1
39	36	15	Mark Thompson (i)	Premium Motorsports	Chevrolet	25	0
40	31	7	Justin Marks (i)	Premium Motorsports	Chevrolet	17	0
Official race results

=== Race statistics ===
- Lead changes: 16 among different drivers
- Cautions/Laps: 11 for 47
- Red flags: 3 for 35 minutes and 30 seconds
- Time of race: 3 hours, 47 minutes, 52 seconds
- Average speed: 131.677 miles per hour (211.914 km/h)

== Media ==
=== Television ===
NBC Sports covered the race on the television side. Rick Allen, Jeff Burton, and Steve Letarte called the race in the booth. Dave Burns, Marty Snider, and Kelli Stavast reported from pit lane during the race.

NBC
Booth announcers	Pit reporters
Lap-by-lap: Rick Allen; Color-commentator: Jeff Burton; Color-commentator: Steve Letarte	Dave Burns; Marty Snider; Kelli Stavast

=== Radio ===
Motor Racing Network will cover the radio call for the race, which was simulcast on Sirius XM NASCAR Radio.

MRN
Booth announcers	Turn announcers	Pit reporters
Lead announcer: Joe Moore; Announcer: Jeff Striegle; Announcer: Rusty Wallace	Turns 1 & 2: Dave Moody; Backstretch: Mike Bagley; Turns 3 & 4: Dan Hubbard	Alex Hayden; Dillon Welch; Kim Coon; Steve Post

== Standings after the race ==
Drivers' Championship standings

	Pos	Driver	Points
	1	Martin Truex Jr.	3,120
8	2	Brad Keselowski	3,101 (–19)
1	3	Kyle Larson	3,096 (–24)
1	4	Kevin Harvick	3,089 (–31)
	5	Denny Hamlin	3,088 (–32)
2	6	Chase Elliott	3,087 (–33)
4	7	Ryan Blaney	3,076 (–44)
1	8	Jimmie Johnson	3,074 (–46)
3	9	Kyle Busch	3,067 (–53)
1	10	Matt Kenseth	3,066 (–54)
1	11	Ricky Stenhouse Jr.	3,052 (–68)
4	12	Jamie McMurray	3,045 (–75)
1	13	Kasey Kahne	2,104 (–1,016)
2	14	Ryan Newman	2,103 (–1,017)
2	15	Austin Dillon	2,099 (–1,021)
1	16	Kurt Busch	2,089 (–1,031)
Official driver's standings

Manufacturers' Championship standings

Pos	Manufacturer	Points
1	Toyota	1,097
2	Chevrolet	1,090 (–7)
3	Ford	1,081 (–16)
Official manufacturers' standings

- Note: Only the first 16 positions are included for the driver standings.

Previous race: 2017 Bank of America 500	Monster Energy NASCAR Cup Series; 2017 season	Next race: 2017 Hollywood Casino 400
