= 2025 Heart of Health Care 200 =

9th race of the 2025 NASCAR Craftsman Truck Series

Race details
- Race 9 of 25 of the 2025 NASCAR Craftsman Truck Series
- Date: May 10, 2025
- Official name: 25th Annual Heart of Health Care 200
- Location: Kansas Speedway in Kansas City, Kansas
- Course: Permanent racing facility
- Course length: 1.5 miles (2.4 km)
- Distance: 134 laps, 201 mi (323 km)
- Scheduled distance: 134 laps, 201 mi (323 km)
- Average speed: 110.829 mph (178.362 km/h)

Pole position
Driver	Jake Garcia	ThorSport Racing
- Time: 30.742

Most laps led
Driver	Carson Hocevar	Spire Motorsports
- Laps: 75

Winner
No. 7	Carson Hocevar	Spire Motorsports

Television in the United States
- Network: FS1
- Announcers: Jamie Little, Brad Keselowski, and Michael Waltrip

Radio in the United States
- Radio: NRN

The 2025 Heart of Health Care 200 was the 9th stock car race of the 2025 NASCAR Craftsman Truck Series, and the 25th iteration of the event. The race was held on Saturday, May 10, 2024, at Kansas Speedway in Kansas City, Kansas, a 1.5 miles (2.4 km) permanent asphalt quad-oval shaped intermediate speedway. The race took the scheduled 134 laps to complete.

In a wild finish, Carson Hocevar, driving for Spire Motorsports, would survive an aggressive last-lap battle with Layne Riggs. Both drivers made contact in turn two, putting both of them in the wall. Hocevar ended up prevailing and held off Riggs to earn his fifth career NASCAR Craftsman Truck Series win, and his first of the season. Following post-race inspection, Riggs was disqualified due to a bed cover violation, and was credited with a 31st place finish. Corey Heim dominated the early stages of the race, winning the first stage and leading the first 52 laps, before facing several amounts of adversity in the final stage, including a pit road mishap on lap 53, and a restart violation on lap 103. He eventually rebounded to finish third following Riggs' disqualification. To fill out the podium, William Byron, driving for Spire Motorsports, would be credited with second place, respectively.

== Report ==
=== Background ===
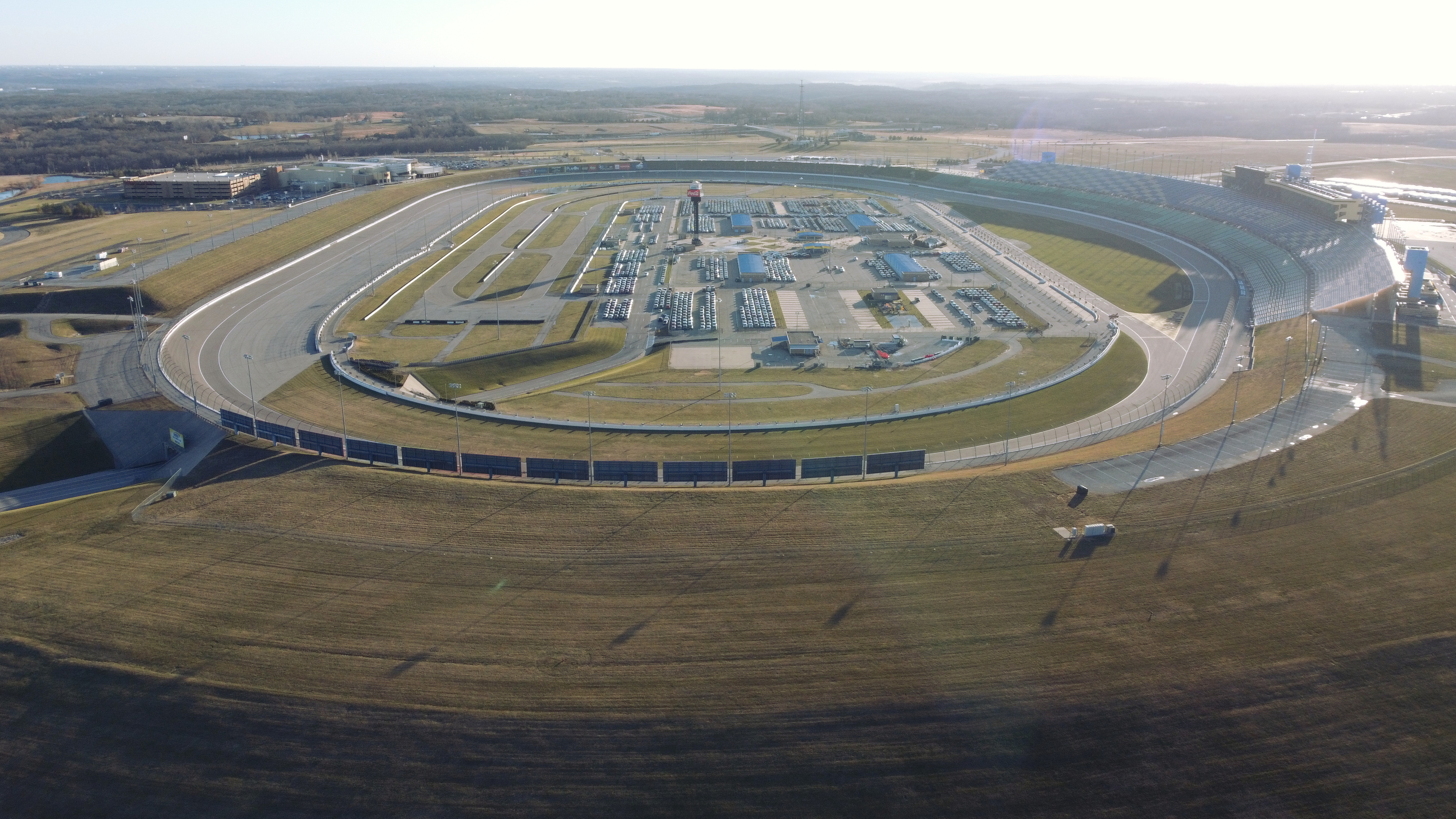
The layout of Kansas Speedway, the track where the race was held.

Kansas Speedway is a 1.5-mile (2.4 km) tri-oval race track in Kansas City, Kansas. It was built in 2001 and hosts two annual NASCAR race weekends. The NTT IndyCar Series also raced there until 2011. The speedway is owned and operated by the International Speedway Corporation.

==== Entry list ====
- (R) denotes rookie driver.
- (i) denotes driver who is ineligible for series driver points.

#	Driver	Team	Make
1	Brandon Jones (i)	Tricon Garage	Toyota
02	Nathan Byrd	Young's Motorsports	Chevrolet
2	Cody Dennison	Reaume Brothers Racing	Ford
5	Toni Breidinger (R)	Tricon Garage	Toyota
07	William Byron (i)	Spire Motorsports	Chevrolet
7	Carson Hocevar (i)	Spire Motorsports	Chevrolet
9	Grant Enfinger	CR7 Motorsports	Chevrolet
11	Corey Heim	Tricon Garage	Toyota
13	Jake Garcia	ThorSport Racing	Ford
15	Tanner Gray	Tricon Garage	Toyota
17	Gio Ruggiero (R)	Tricon Garage	Toyota
18	Tyler Ankrum	McAnally-Hilgemann Racing	Chevrolet
19	Daniel Hemric	McAnally-Hilgemann Racing	Chevrolet
22	Morgen Baird	Reaume Brothers Racing	Ford
26	Dawson Sutton (R)	Rackley W.A.R.	Chevrolet
33	Frankie Muniz (R)	Reaume Brothers Racing	Ford
34	Layne Riggs	Front Row Motorsports	Ford
38	Chandler Smith	Front Row Motorsports	Ford
42	Matt Mills	Niece Motorsports	Chevrolet
44	Bayley Currey	Niece Motorsports	Chevrolet
45	Kaden Honeycutt	Niece Motorsports	Chevrolet
52	Stewart Friesen	Halmar Friesen Racing	Toyota
66	Luke Baldwin	ThorSport Racing	Ford
71	Rajah Caruth	Spire Motorsports	Chevrolet
76	Spencer Boyd	Freedom Racing Enterprises	Chevrolet
77	Andrés Pérez de Lara (R)	Spire Motorsports	Chevrolet
81	Connor Mosack (R)	McAnally-Hilgemann Racing	Chevrolet
88	Matt Crafton	ThorSport Racing	Ford
91	Jack Wood	McAnally-Hilgemann Racing	Chevrolet
98	Ty Majeski	ThorSport Racing	Ford
99	Ben Rhodes	ThorSport Racing	Ford
Official entry list

== Practice ==
For practice, drivers were split into two groups, A and B. Both sessions were 25 minutes long, and was held on Saturday, May 10, at 1:05 PM CST. Kaden Honeycutt, driving for Niece Motorsports, would set the fastest time between both groups, with a lap of 31.029, and a speed of 174.031 mph (280.076 km/h).

Pos.	#	Driver	Team	Make	Time	Speed
1	45	Kaden Honeycutt	Niece Motorsports	Chevrolet	31.029	174.031
2	52	Stewart Friesen	Halmar Friesen Racing	Toyota	31.104	173.611
3	81	Connor Mosack (R)	McAnally-Hilgemann Racing	Chevrolet	31.107	173.594
Full practice results

== Qualifying ==
Qualifying was held on Saturday, May 10, at 2:10 PM CST. Since Kansas Speedway is an intermediate speedway, the qualifying system used is a single-car, one-lap system with one round. Drivers will be on track by themselves and will have one lap to post a qualifying time, and whoever sets the fastest time will win the pole.

Jake Garcia, driving for ThorSport Racing, would score the pole for the race, with a lap of 30.742, and a speed of 175.655 mph (282.689 km/h).

No drivers would fail to qualify.

=== Qualifying results ===
Pos.	#	Driver	Team	Make	Time	Speed
1	13	Jake Garcia	ThorSport Racing	Ford	30.742	175.655
2	11	Corey Heim	Tricon Garage	Toyota	30.843	175.080
3	98	Ty Majeski	ThorSport Racing	Ford	30.847	175.058
4	7	Carson Hocevar (i)	Spire Motorsports	Chevrolet	30.906	174.723
5	99	Ben Rhodes	ThorSport Racing	Ford	30.982	174.295
6	71	Rajah Caruth	Spire Motorsports	Chevrolet	30.999	174.199
7	45	Kaden Honeycutt	Niece Motorsports	Chevrolet	31.007	174.154
8	26	Dawson Sutton (R)	Rackley W.A.R.	Chevrolet	31.026	174.048
9	15	Tanner Gray	Tricon Garage	Toyota	31.064	173.835
10	17	Gio Ruggiero (R)	Tricon Garage	Toyota	31.081	173.740
11	07	William Byron (i)	Spire Motorsports	Chevrolet	31.105	173.606
12	18	Tyler Ankrum	McAnally-Hilgemann Racing	Chevrolet	31.111	173.572
13	38	Chandler Smith	Front Row Motorsports	Ford	31.121	173.516
14	77	Andrés Pérez de Lara (R)	Spire Motorsports	Chevrolet	31.121	173.516
15	9	Grant Enfinger	CR7 Motorsports	Chevrolet	31.125	173.494
16	34	Layne Riggs	Front Row Motorsports	Ford	31.131	173.461
17	44	Bayley Currey	Niece Motorsports	Chevrolet	31.135	173.438
18	42	Matt Mills	Niece Motorsports	Chevrolet	31.187	173.149
19	52	Stewart Friesen	Halmar Friesen Racing	Toyota	31.189	173.138
20	81	Connor Mosack (R)	McAnally-Hilgemann Racing	Chevrolet	31.195	173.105
21	91	Jack Wood	McAnally-Hilgemann Racing	Chevrolet	31.204	173.055
22	19	Daniel Hemric	McAnally-Hilgemann Racing	Chevrolet	31.206	173.044
23	66	Luke Baldwin	ThorSport Racing	Ford	31.226	172.933
24	1	Brandon Jones (i)	Tricon Garage	Toyota	31.301	172.518
25	88	Matt Crafton	ThorSport Racing	Ford	31.498	171.439
26	5	Toni Breidinger (R)	Tricon Garage	Toyota	31.519	171.325
27	2	Cody Dennison	Reaume Brothers Racing	Ford	31.696	170.369
28	76	Spencer Boyd	Freedom Racing Enterprises	Chevrolet	31.804	169.790
29	02	Nathan Byrd	Young's Motorsports	Chevrolet	31.846	169.566
30	33	Frankie Muniz (R)	Reaume Brothers Racing	Ford	32.017	168.660
31	22	Morgen Baird	Reaume Brothers Racing	Ford	33.106	163.112
Official qualifying results
Official starting lineup

== Race results ==
Stage 1 Laps: 30

Pos.	#	Driver	Team	Make	Pts
1	11	Corey Heim	Tricon Garage	Toyota	10
2	71	Rajah Caruth	Spire Motorsports	Chevrolet	9
3	9	Grant Enfinger	CR7 Motorsports	Chevrolet	8
4	7	Carson Hocevar (i)	Spire Motorsports	Chevrolet	0
5	38	Chandler Smith	Front Row Motorsports	Ford	6
6	19	Daniel Hemric	McAnally-Hilgemann Racing	Chevrolet	5
7	45	Kaden Honeycutt	Niece Motorsports	Chevrolet	4
8	15	Tanner Gray	Tricon Garage	Toyota	3
9	44	Bayley Currey	Niece Motorsports	Chevrolet	2
10	81	Connor Mosack (R)	McAnally-Hilgemann Racing	Chevrolet	1

Stage 2 Laps: 30

Pos.	#	Driver	Team	Make	Pts
1	7	Carson Hocevar (i)	Spire Motorsports	Chevrolet	0
2	9	Grant Enfinger	CR7 Motorsports	Chevrolet	9
3	07	William Byron (i)	Spire Motorsports	Chevrolet	0
4	19	Daniel Hemric	McAnally-Hilgemann Racing	Chevrolet	7
5	15	Tanner Gray	Tricon Garage	Toyota	6
6	18	Tyler Ankrum	McAnally-Hilgemann Racing	Chevrolet	5
7	99	Ben Rhodes	ThorSport Racing	Ford	4
8	45	Kaden Honeycutt	Niece Motorsports	Chevrolet	3
9	71	Rajah Caruth	Spire Motorsports	Chevrolet	2
10	1	Brandon Jones (i)	Tricon Garage	Toyota	0

Stage 3 Laps: 74

Fin	St	#	Driver	Team	Make	Laps	Led	Status	Pts
1	4	7	Carson Hocevar (i)	Spire Motorsports	Chevrolet	134	75	Running	0
2	11	07	William Byron (i)	Spire Motorsports	Chevrolet	134	4	Running	0
3	2	11	Corey Heim	Tricon Garage	Toyota	134	52	Running	44
4	10	17	Gio Ruggiero (R)	Tricon Garage	Toyota	134	0	Running	33
5	19	52	Stewart Friesen	Halmar Friesen Racing	Toyota	134	0	Running	32
6	24	1	Brandon Jones (i)	Tricon Garage	Toyota	134	0	Running	0
7	1	13	Jake Garcia	ThorSport Racing	Ford	134	0	Running	30
8	7	45	Kaden Honeycutt	Niece Motorsports	Chevrolet	134	0	Running	36
9	15	9	Grant Enfinger	CR7 Motorsports	Chevrolet	134	2	Running	45
10	22	19	Daniel Hemric	McAnally-Hilgemann Racing	Chevrolet	134	0	Running	39
11	5	99	Ben Rhodes	ThorSport Racing	Ford	134	0	Running	30
12	18	42	Matt Mills	Niece Motorsports	Chevrolet	134	0	Running	25
13	25	88	Matt Crafton	ThorSport Racing	Ford	134	0	Running	24
14	3	98	Ty Majeski	ThorSport Racing	Ford	134	0	Running	23
15	8	26	Dawson Sutton (R)	Rackley W.A.R.	Chevrolet	134	0	Running	22
16	12	18	Tyler Ankrum	McAnally-Hilgemann Racing	Chevrolet	134	0	Running	26
17	13	38	Chandler Smith	Front Row Motorsports	Ford	134	0	Running	26
18	20	81	Connor Mosack (R)	McAnally-Hilgemann Racing	Chevrolet	134	0	Running	20
19	14	77	Andrés Pérez de Lara (R)	Spire Motorsports	Chevrolet	134	0	Running	18
20	26	5	Toni Breidinger (R)	Tricon Garage	Toyota	134	0	Running	17
21	6	71	Rajah Caruth	Spire Motorsports	Chevrolet	133	0	Running	27
22	27	2	Cody Dennison	Reaume Brothers Racing	Ford	133	0	Running	15
23	28	76	Spencer Boyd	Freedom Racing Enterprises	Chevrolet	132	0	Running	14
24	21	91	Jack Wood	McAnally-Hilgemann Racing	Chevrolet	132	0	Running	13
25	31	22	Morgen Baird	Reaume Brothers Racing	Ford	131	0	Running	12
26	17	44	Bayley Currey	Niece Motorsports	Chevrolet	130	0	Running	13
27	9	15	Tanner Gray	Tricon Garage	Toyota	128	0	Electrical	19
28	30	33	Frankie Muniz (R)	Reaume Brothers Racing	Ford	94	1	Handling	9
29	29	02	Nathan Byrd	Young's Motorsports	Chevrolet	72	0	Overheating	8
30	23	66	Luke Baldwin	ThorSport Racing	Ford	17	0	Accident	7
DSQ	16	34	Layne Riggs	Front Row Motorsports	Ford	134	0	Running	6
Official race results

== Standings after the race ==
Drivers' Championship standings

	Pos	Driver	Points
	1	Corey Heim	412
	2	Chandler Smith	348 (-64)
	3	Daniel Hemric	327 (–85)
	4	Tyler Ankrum	312 (–100)
1	5	Grant Enfinger	295 (–117)
1	6	Ty Majeski	285 (–127)
	7	Jake Garcia	274 (–138)
1	8	Kaden Honeycutt	256 (–156)
1	9	Layne Riggs	248 (–164)
	10	Ben Rhodes	245 (–167)
Official driver's standings

Manufacturers' Championship standings

Pos	Manufacturer	Points
1	Chevrolet	338
2	Toyota	317 (-21)
3	Ford	304 (–34)

- Note: Only the first 10 positions are included for the driver standings.

Previous race: 2025 SpeedyCash.com 250	NASCAR Craftsman Truck Series; 2025 season	Next race: 2025 Window World 250
