= Morgen Baird =

American racing driver (born 1993)

- Born: Morgen John Baird; March 3, 1993 (age 33); Grass Lake, Michigan, U.S.

NASCAR O'Reilly Auto Parts Series career
- 1 race run over 1 year
- 2024 position: 73rd
- Best finish: 73rd (2024)
- First race: 2024 Focused Health 250 (Atlanta)
Wins	Top tens	Poles
0	0	0

NASCAR FedEx Freight Truck Series career
- 3 races run over 2 years
- 2026 position: 81st
- Best finish: 57th (2025)
- First race: 2025 Heart of Health Care 200 (Kansas)
- Last race: 2026 DQS Solutions & Staffing 250 (Michigan)
Wins	Top tens	Poles
0	0	0

ARCA Menards Series career
- 16 races run over 10 years
- Best finish: 35th (2019)
- First race: 2016 Corrigan Oil 200 (Michigan)
- Last race: 2026 Ashley Furniture 150 (Chicagoland)
Wins	Top tens	Poles
0	3	0
- Statistics up to date as of November 6, 2026.

Morgen John Baird (born March 3, 1993) is an American professional stock car racing driver. He last competed part-time in the NASCAR Craftsman Truck Series, driving the No. 2 Ford F-150 for Team Reaume, and part-time in the ARCA Menards Series, driving the No. 19/91 Chevrolet/Ford for Maples Motorsports. He has previously competed in the NASCAR Xfinity Series.

== Racing career ==
Baird began racing in go-karts in Jackson, Michigan at the age of twelve, and he won in his second start in the Jr. Sportsman class, before moving up to the Jr. Can class, where he won the championship in 2007.

Baird moved up to mini-cup racing the following year at Jackson Speedway, where he finished second in the points. three feature wins and three heat wins. He also ran the Great Lakes Super Mini-Cup Series during that time, and despite missing an opening race due to age restrictions, he won a race at Owosso Speedway. In 2009, Baird moved up to the GLS Series, finishing runner-up in the points and winning rookie of the year honors that season. He went on to win the title the following year with five feature race wins, seven poles (with four of them setting new track records), twelve top-fives, and eight heat race wins. He won the title again in 2011 with twelve poles, six feature race wins, six heat race wins, and eight poles, and won the title for two more years in 2012 and 2013.

Baird moved to dwarf cars in 2014, driving for Finishline Racing in the MCR Dwarf Series, finishing third in the points that year, whilst also winning rookie of the year honors. He departed the team to race in his own equipment in 2015 and finished fourth in the points that year.

In 2016, Baird made his ARCA Racing Series debut at Michigan International Speedway, driving the No. 64 Chevrolet for Hixson Motorsports, where he finished seventh. He repeated that finish in his next start at Chicagoland Speedway. He joined Jent Motorsports at Kansas Speedway, driving the No. 14 Ford and finished 22nd. It was also during this year that he made two starts in the World Series of Asphalt Stock Car Racing in the pro late model division. He made two starts at Michigan for the next two years in ARCA, driving for Fast Track Racing with a best finish of 19th in 2018.

In 2019, Baird ran at Salem Speedway for Fast Track in the No. 11, finishing sixteenth due to a radio issue. He made two more starts that year, finishing eleventh at Michigan, and thirteenth at Chicagoland. He made a one-off start at Michigan the following year in the No. 10 Ford, finishing fifteenth due to brake issues.

In 2021, Baird got his first top-ten finish at Michigan, finishing seventh on the lead lap after starting in that same position. He finished in the top ten at the track again in 2022, finishing tenth. It was also during this year that Baird joined Venturini Motorsports in the No. 55 Toyota at the season finale at Toledo Speedway. In a car that shared visual similarities to the No. 20 car of Jesse Love in that same event, he did not start the race and was classified in 24th. He then ran only one race for Fast Track in 2023, finishing a career-best sixth at Michigan.

On March 27, 2024, it was announced that Baird would make his NASCAR Xfinity Series debut at Richmond Raceway, driving the No. 6 Chevrolet for JD Motorsports. However, two days later, it was announced that Baird would postpone his debut in the series due to his fiancé going into induced labor with their soon to be born child; he would be replaced by Garrett Smithley. On August 12, it was announced that Baird would instead make his debut at Michigan, this time driving the No. 53 for Joey Gase Motorsports, although he would fail to qualify. He then made the race at Atlanta Motor Speedway with the team, where he finished in 33rd.

On April 10, 2025, it was announced that Baird would run a partial schedule in the NASCAR Craftsman Truck Series, driving the No. 22 Ford for Reaume Brothers Racing.

== Personal life ==
Baird currently resides in Jackson, Michigan.

== Motorsports results ==
=== Racing career summary ===
Season	Series	Team	Races	Wins	Top 5	Top 10	Points	Position
2016	ARCA Racing Series	Hixson Motorsports	2	0	0	0	410	60th
2016	ARCA Racing Series	Jent Motorsports	1	0	0	0	410	60th
2017	ARCA Racing Series	Fast Track Racing	1	0	0	0	125	103rd
2018	ARCA Racing Series	Fast Track Racing	1	0	0	0	140	97th
2019	ARCA Menards Series	Fast Track Racing	3	0	0	0	490	35th
2020	ARCA Menards Series	Fast Track Racing	1	0	0	0	29	75th
2021	ARCA Menards Series	Fast Track Racing	1	0	0	1	37	80th
2022	ARCA Menards Series	Fast Track Racing	1	0	0	1	54	61st
2022	ARCA Menards Series	Venturini Motorsports	1	0	0	0	54	61st
2023	ARCA Menards Series	Fast Track Racing	1	0	0	1	38	75th
2024	NASCAR Xfinity Series	Joey Gase Motorsports	1	0	0	0	4	73rd
2025	ARCA Menards Series	Fast Track Racing	1	0	0	0	31	109th
2025	NASCAR Craftsman Truck Series	Reaume Brothers Racing	2	0	0	0	20	57th
2026	ARCA Menards Series	Maples Motorsports	2	0	0	0	52	71st
2026	NASCAR Craftsman Truck Series	Team Reaume	1	0	0	0	11	81st

=== NASCAR ===
(key) (Bold – Pole position awarded by qualifying time. Italics – Pole position earned by points standings or practice time. * – Most laps led.)

==== Xfinity Series ====
NASCAR Xfinity Series results
Year	Team	No.	Make	1	2	3	4	5	6	7	8	9	10	11	12	13	14	15	16	17	18	19	20	21	22	23	24	25	26	27	28	29	30	31	32	33	NXSC	Pts	Ref
2024	Joey Gase Motorsports	53	Ford	DAY	ATL	LVS	PHO	COA	RCH	MAR	TEX	TAL	DOV	DAR	CLT	PIR	SON	IOW	NHA	NSH	CSC	POC	IND	MCH; DNQ	DAY	DAR	ATL; 33	GLN	BRI	KAN	TAL	ROV	LVS	HOM	MAR	PHO	73rd	4	

==== Craftsman Truck Series ====
NASCAR Craftsman Truck Series results
Year	Team	No.	Make	1	2	3	4	5	6	7	8	9	10	11	12	13	14	15	16	17	18	19	20	21	22	23	24	25	NCTC	Pts	Ref
2025	Reaume Brothers Racing	22	Ford	DAY	ATL	LVS	HOM	MAR	BRI	CAR	TEX	KAN; 25	NWS	CLT	NSH														57th	20	
2025	Reaume Brothers Racing	2	Ford													MCH; 29	POC	LRP	IRP	GLN	RCH	DAR	BRI	NHA	ROV	TAL	MAR	PHO	57th	20	
2026	Team Reaume	2	Ford	DAY	ATL	STP	DAR	CAR	BRI	TEX	GLN	DOV	CLT	NSH	MCH; 26	COR	LRP	NWS	IRP	RCH	NHA	BRI	KAN	CLT	PHO	TAL	MAR	HOM	81st	11	

^{*} Season still in progress
^{1} Ineligible for series points

=== ARCA Menards Series ===
(key) (Bold – Pole position awarded by qualifying time. Italics – Pole position earned by points standings or practice time. * – Most laps led.)

ARCA Menards Series results
Year	Team	No.	Make	1	2	3	4	5	6	7	8	9	10	11	12	13	14	15	16	17	18	19	20	AMSC	Pts	Ref
2016	Hixson Motorsports	64	Chevy	DAY	NSH	SLM	TAL	TOL	NJE	POC	MCH; 17	MAD	WIN	IOW	IRP	POC	BLN	ISF	DSF	SLM	CHI; 17	KEN		60th	410	
2016	Jent Motorsports	14	Ford																				KAN; 22	60th	410	
2017	Fast Track Racing	10	Toyota	DAY	NSH	SLM	TAL	TOL	ELK	POC	MCH; 21	MAD	IOW	IRP	POC	WIN	ISF	ROA	DSF	SLM	CHI	KEN	KAN	103rd	125	
2018	Fast Track Racing	11	Toyota	DAY	NSH	SLM	TAL	TOL	CLT	POC	MCH; 19	MAD	GTW	CHI	IOW	ELK	POC	ISF	BLN	DSF	SLM	IRP	KAN	97th	140	
2019	Fast Track Racing	11	Ford	DAY	FIF	SLM; 16	TAL	NSH	TOL	CLT	POC													35th	490	
2019	Fast Track Racing	11	Toyota									MCH; 11	MAD	GTW	CHI; 13	ELK	IOW	POC	ISF	DSF	SLM	IRP	KAN	35th	490	
2020	Fast Track Racing	10	Ford	DAY	PHO	TAL	POC	IRP	KEN	IOW	KAN	TOL	TOL	MCH; 15	DAY	GTW	I44	TOL	BRI	WIN	MEM	ISF	KAN	75th	29	
2021	Fast Track Racing	10	Toyota	DAY	PHO	TAL	KAN	TOL	CLT	MOH	POC	ELK	BLN	IOW	WIN	GLN	MCH; 7	ISF	MLW	DSF	BRI	SLM	KAN	80th	37	
2022	Fast Track Racing	11	Toyota	DAY	PHO	TAL	KAN	CLT	IOW	BLN	ELK	MOH	POC	IRP	MCH; 10	GLN	ISF	MLW	DSF	KAN	BRI	SLM		61st	54	
2022	Venturini Motorsports	55	Toyota																				TOL; 24	61st	54	
2023	Fast Track Racing	11	Toyota	DAY	PHO	TAL	KAN	CLT	BLN	ELK	MOH	IOW	POC	MCH; 6	IRP	GLN	ISF	MLW	DSF	KAN	BRI	SLM	TOL	75th	38	
2025	Fast Track Racing	11	Ford	DAY	PHO	TAL	KAN	CLT	MCH; 13	BLN	ELK	LRP	DOV	IRP	IOW	GLN	ISF	MAD	DSF	BRI	SLM	KAN	TOL	109th	31	
2026	Maples Motorsports	19	Chevy	DAY	PHO	KAN	TAL	GLN	TOL	MCH; 22	POC	BER	ELK											71st	52	
2026	Maples Motorsports	91	Ford											CHI; 14	LRP	IRP	IOW	ISF	MAD	DSF	SLM	BRI	KAN	71st	52	
