= 2024 Focused Health 250 (Atlanta) =

24th race of the 2024 NASCAR Xfinity Series

Race details
- Race 24 of 33 of the 2024 NASCAR Xfinity Series
- Date: September 7, 2024
- Official name: 4th Annual Focused Health 250
- Location: Atlanta Motor Speedway, Hampton, Georgia
- Course: Permanent racing facility
- Course length: 1.54 miles (2.48 km)
- Distance: 163 laps, 251 mi (404 km)
- Scheduled distance: 163 laps, 251 mi (404 km)
- Average speed: 118.514 mph (190.730 km/h)

Pole position
Driver	Jesse Love	Richard Childress Racing
- Time: 32.927

Most laps led
Driver	A. J. Allmendinger	Kaulig Racing
- Laps: 40

Winner
No. 21	Austin Hill	Richard Childress Racing

Television in the United States
- Network: USA
- Announcers: Rick Allen, Jeff Burton, Steve Letarte

Radio in the United States
- Radio: PRN

The 2024 Focused Health 250 was the 24th stock car race of the 2024 NASCAR Xfinity Series, and the 4th iteration of the event. The race was held on Saturday, September 7, 2024, in Hampton, Georgia at Atlanta Motor Speedway, a 1.54 miles (2.48 km) permanent quad-oval shaped racetrack. The race took the scheduled 163 laps to complete. Austin Hill, driving for Richard Childress Racing, would take advantage of a late-race restart, and held off Parker Kligerman to earn his 9th career NASCAR Xfinity Series win, his fourth of the season, and sweeping Atlanta, with a win in the spring. A. J. Allmendinger dominated most of the race, leading a race-high 40 laps. To fill out the podium, Kilgerman, driving for Big Machine Racing, and Allmendinger, driving for Kaulig Racing, would finish 2nd and 3rd, respectively.

== Report ==
=== Background ===
Atlanta Motor Speedway is a track in Hampton, Georgia, 20 miles (32 km) south of Atlanta. It is a 1.54-mile (2.48 km) quad-oval track with a seating capacity of 111,000. It opened in 1960 as a 1.5-mile (2.4 km) standard oval. In 1994, 46 condominiums were built over the northeastern side of the track. In 1997, to standardize the track with Speedway Motorsports' other two 1.5-mile (2.4 km) ovals, the entire track was almost completely rebuilt. The frontstretch and backstretch were swapped, and the configuration of the track was changed from oval to quad-oval. The project made the track one of the fastest on the NASCAR circuit.

==== Entry list ====
- (R) denotes rookie driver.
- (i) denotes driver who is ineligible for series driver points.

#	Driver	Team	Make
00	Cole Custer	Stewart–Haas Racing	Ford
1	Sam Mayer	JR Motorsports	Chevrolet
2	Jesse Love (R)	Richard Childress Racing	Chevrolet
5	Anthony Alfredo	Our Motorsports	Chevrolet
07	C. J. McLaughlin	SS-Green Light Racing	Chevrolet
7	Justin Allgaier	JR Motorsports	Chevrolet
8	Sammy Smith	JR Motorsports	Chevrolet
9	Brandon Jones	JR Motorsports	Chevrolet
11	Josh Williams	Kaulig Racing	Chevrolet
14	David Starr	SS-Green Light Racing	Ford
15	Lawless Alan (i)	AM Racing	Ford
16	A. J. Allmendinger	Kaulig Racing	Chevrolet
18	Sheldon Creed	Joe Gibbs Racing	Toyota
19	Taylor Gray (i)	Joe Gibbs Racing	Toyota
20	Ryan Truex	Joe Gibbs Racing	Toyota
21	Austin Hill	Richard Childress Racing	Chevrolet
26	Corey Heim (i)	Sam Hunt Racing	Toyota
27	Jeb Burton	Jordan Anderson Racing	Chevrolet
28	Kyle Sieg	RSS Racing	Ford
29	Blaine Perkins	RSS Racing	Ford
31	Parker Retzlaff	Jordan Anderson Racing	Chevrolet
35	Mason Maggio (i)	Joey Gase Motorsports	Chevrolet
38	Matt DiBenedetto	RSS Racing	Ford
39	Ryan Sieg	RSS Racing	Ford
42	Leland Honeyman (R)	Young's Motorsports	Chevrolet
43	Ryan Ellis	Alpha Prime Racing	Chevrolet
44	Brennan Poole	Alpha Prime Racing	Chevrolet
45	Garrett Smithley	Alpha Prime Racing	Chevrolet
48	Parker Kligerman	Big Machine Racing	Chevrolet
51	Jeremy Clements	Jeremy Clements Racing	Chevrolet
53	Morgen Baird	Joey Gase Motorsports	Ford
74	Dawson Cram (i)	Mike Harmon Racing	Chevrolet
81	Chandler Smith	Joe Gibbs Racing	Toyota
91	Kyle Weatherman	DGM Racing	Chevrolet
92	Nick Leitz	DGM Racing	Chevrolet
97	Shane van Gisbergen (R)	Kaulig Racing	Chevrolet
98	Riley Herbst	Stewart–Haas Racing	Ford
Official entry list

== Qualifying ==
Qualifying was held on Saturday, September 7, at 11:00 AM EST. Since Atlanta Motor Speedway is an intermediate racetrack with superspeedway rules, the qualifying system used is a single-car, single-lap system with two rounds. In the first round, drivers have one lap to set a time. The fastest ten drivers from the first round move on to the second round. Whoever sets the fastest time in Round 2 wins the pole.

Jesse Love, driving for Richard Childress Racing, would score the pole for the race with a time of 31.927, and a speed of 173.646 mph (279.456 km/h).

=== Qualifying results ===
Pos	No.	Driver	Team	Manufacturer	R1	R2
1	2	Jesse Love (R)	Richard Childress Racing	Chevrolet	32.028	31.927
2	19	Taylor Gray (i)	Joe Gibbs Racing	Toyota	32.094	31.956
3	00	Cole Custer	Stewart–Haas Racing	Ford	32.101	31.966
4	21	Austin Hill	Richard Childress Racing	Chevrolet	32.198	32.045
5	18	Sheldon Creed	Joe Gibbs Racing	Toyota	32.204	32.048
9	16	A. J. Allmendinger	Kaulig Racing	Chevrolet	32.118	32.057
6	20	Ryan Truex (i)	Joe Gibbs Racing	Toyota	32.150	32.065
7	81	Chandler Smith	Joe Gibbs Racing	Toyota	32.207	32.086
8	98	Riley Herbst	Stewart–Haas Racing	Ford	32.133	32.098
10	7	Justin Allgaier	JR Motorsports	Chevrolet	32.194	32.108
11	1	Sam Mayer	JR Motorsports	Chevrolet	32.259	—
12	97	Shane van Gisbergen (R)	Kaulig Racing	Chevrolet	32.289	—
13	11	Josh Williams	Kaulig Racing	Chevrolet	32.301	—
14	39	Ryan Sieg	RSS Racing	Ford	32.309	—
15	5	Anthony Alfredo	Our Motorsports	Chevrolet	32.334	—
16	48	Parker Kligerman	Big Machine Racing	Chevrolet	32.348	—
17	31	Parker Retzlaff	Jordan Anderson Racing	Chevrolet	32.386	—
18	9	Brandon Jones	JR Motorsports	Chevrolet	32.407	—
19	8	Sammy Smith	JR Motorsports	Chevrolet	32.448	—
20	27	Jeb Burton	Jordan Anderson Racing	Chevrolet	32.515	—
21	26	Corey Heim	Sam Hunt Racing	Toyota	32.532	—
22	15	Lawless Alan (i)	AM Racing	Ford	32.583	—
23	07	C. J. McLaughlin	SS-Green Light Racing	Chevrolet	32.610	—
24	29	Blaine Perkins	RSS Racing	Ford	32.634	—
25	92	Nick Leitz	DGM Racing	Chevrolet	32.678	—
26	44	Brennan Poole	Alpha Prime Racing	Chevrolet	32.748	—
27	35	Mason Maggio (i)	Joey Gase Motorsports	Ford	32.826	—
28	28	Kyle Sieg	RSS Racing	Ford	32.830	—
29	38	Matt DiBenedetto	RSS Racing	Ford	32.971	—
30	45	Garrett Smithley	Alpha Prime Racing	Chevrolet	33.088	—
31	74	Dawson Cram (i)	Mike Harmon Racing	Chevrolet	33.097	—
32	53	Morgen Baird	Joey Gase Motorsports	Toyota	33.194	—
33	14	David Starr	SS-Green Light Racing	Chevrolet	33.218	—
Qualified by owner's points
34	43	Ryan Ellis	Alpha Prime Racing	Chevrolet	33.300	—
35	42	Leland Honeyman (R)	Young's Motorsports	Chevrolet	33.372	—
36	51	Jeremy Clements	Jeremy Clements Racing	Chevrolet	33.385	—
37	91	Kyle Weatherman	DGM Racing	Chevrolet	0	—
Official starting lineup

== Race results ==
Stage 1 Laps: 40

Pos.	#	Driver	Team	Make	Pts
1	7	Justin Allgaier	JR Motorsports	Chevrolet	10
2	21	Austin Hill	Richard Childress Racing	Chevrolet	9
3	98	Riley Herbst	Stewart-Haas Racing	Ford	8
4	18	Sheldon Creed	Joe Gibbs Racing	Toyota	7
5	2	Jesse Love (R)	Richard Childress Racing	Chevrolet	6
6	1	Sam Mayer	JR Motorsports	Chevrolet	5
7	9	Brandon Jones	JR Motorsports	Chevrolet	4
8	00	Cole Custer	Stewart-Haas Racing	Ford	3
9	81	Chandler Smith	Joe Gibbs Racing	Toyota	2
10	19	Taylor Gray (i)	Joe Gibbs Racing	Toyota	0

Stage 2 Laps: 40

Pos.	#	Driver	Team	Make	Pts
1	16	A. J. Allmendinger	Kaulig Racing	Chevrolet	10
2	8	Sammy Smith	JR Motorsports	Chevrolet	9
3	00	Cole Custer	Stewart-Haas Racing	Ford	8
4	98	Riley Herbst	Stewart-Haas Racing	Ford	7
5	7	Justin Allgaier	JR Motorsports	Chevrolet	6
6	2	Jesse Love (R)	Richard Childress Racing	Chevrolet	5
10	19	Taylor Gray (i)	Joe Gibbs Racing	Toyota	0
8	81	Chandler Smith	Joe Gibbs Racing	Toyota	3
9	97	Shane van Gisbergen (R)	Kaulig Racing	Chevrolet	2
10	21	Austin Hill	Richard Childress Racing	Chevrolet	1

Stage 3 Laps: 89

Pos.	St.	#	Driver	Team	Make	Laps	Led	Status	Pts
1	4	21	Austin Hill	Richard Childress Racing	Chevrolet	163	12	Running	50
2	16	48	Parker Kligerman	Big Machine Racing	Chevrolet	163	0	Running	35
3	6	16	A. J. Allmendinger	Kaulig Racing	Chevrolet	163	40	Running	44
4	8	81	Chandler Smith	Joe Gibbs Racing	Toyota	163	28	Running	38
5	21	26	Corey Heim (i)	Sam Hunt Racing	Toyota	163	0	Running	0
6	1	2	Jesse Love (R)	Richard Childress Racing	Chevrolet	163	23	Running	42
7	19	8	Sammy Smith	JR Motorsports	Chevrolet	163	0	Running	39
8	13	11	Josh Williams	Kaulig Racing	Chevrolet	163	0	Running	29
9	18	9	Brandon Jones	JR Motorsports	Chevrolet	163	0	Running	32
10	7	20	Ryan Truex	Joe Gibbs Racing	Toyota	163	0	Running	27
11	37	29	Kyle Weatherman	DGM Racing	Chevrolet	163	0	Running	26
12	17	31	Parker Retzlaff	Jorden Anderson Racing	Chevrolet	163	0	Running	25
13	22	15	Lawless Alan (i)	AM Racing	Ford	163	0	Running	0
14	15	5	Anthony Alfredo	Our Motorsports	Chevrolet	163	0	Running	23
15	26	44	Brennan Poole	Alpha Prime Racing	Chevrolet	163	0	Running	22
16	28	28	Kyle Sieg	RSS Racing	Ford	163	0	Running	21
17	35	42	Leland Honeyman (R)	Young's Motorsports	Chevrolet	163	1	Running	20
18	27	35	Mason Maggio (i)	Joey Gase Motorsports	Ford	163	0	Running	0
19	24	29	Blaine Perkins	RSS Racing	Ford	163	0	Running	18
20	25	92	Nick Leitz	DGM Racing	Chevrolet	163	0	Running	17
21	34	43	Ryan Ellis	Alpha Prime Racing	Chevrolet	163	0	Running	16
22	33	14	David Starr	SS-Green Light Racing	Chevrolet	163	0	Running	15
23	30	45	Garrett Smithley	Alpha Prime Racing	Chevrolet	163	0	Running	14
24	20	27	Jeb Burton	Jorden Anderson Racing	Chevrolet	162	0	Running	13
25	5	18	Sheldon Creed	Joe Gibbs Racing	Toyota	160	1	Running	19
26	9	98	Riley Herbst	Stewart-Haas Racing	Ford	158	0	Running	26
27	12	97	Shane van Gisbergen (R)	Kaulig Racing	Chevrolet	157	0	Running	12
28	2	19	Taylor Gray (i)	Joe Gibbs Racing	Toyota	154	12	Suspension	0
29	36	51	Jermey Clements	Jermey Clements Racing	Chevrolet	149	0	Suspension	8
30	10	7	Justin Allgaier	JR Motorsports	Chevrolet	146	19	Accident	23
31	3	00	Cole Custer	Stewart-Haas Racing	Ford	144	0	Accident	17
32	14	39	Ryan Sieg	RSS Racing	Ford	144	0	Accident	5
33	32	53	Morgan Baird	Joey Gase Motorsports	Ford	142	0	Running	4
34	23	07	C. J. McLaughlin	SS-Green Light Racing	Chevrolet	112	0	Engine	3
35	28	38	Matt DiBenedetto	RSS Racing	Ford	80	0	Oil Line	2
36	11	1	Sam Mayer	JR Motorsports	Chevrolet	77	0	Accident	6
37	31	74	Dawson Cram (i)	Mike Harmon Racing	Chevrolet	18	0	Mechanical	0

== Standings after the race ==
Drivers' Championship standings

	Pos	Driver	Points
	1	Justin Allgaier	866
	2	Cole Custer	832 (-34)
	3	Chandler Smith	799 (–67)
	4	Austin Hill	795 (–71)
1	5	A. J. Allmendinger	744 (–122)
1	6	Sheldon Creed	723 (–143)
	7	Riley Herbst	693 (–173)
	8	Jesse Love	683 (–173)
	9	Parker Kligerman	674 (–193)
	10	Sammy Smith	644 (–222)
	11	Ryan Sieg	600 (–266)
	12	Shane van Gisbergen	574 (–292)
Official driver's standings

Manufacturers' Championship standings

Pos	Manufacturer	Points
1	Chevrolet	892
2	Toyota	856 (-36)
3	Ford	767 (–125)

- Note: Only the first 12 positions are included for the driver standings.

Previous race: 2024 Sport Clips Haircuts VFW 200	NASCAR Xfinity Series; 2024 season	Next race: 2024 Mission 200 at The Glen
