= 2024 NASCAR Xfinity Series =

American motorsport season

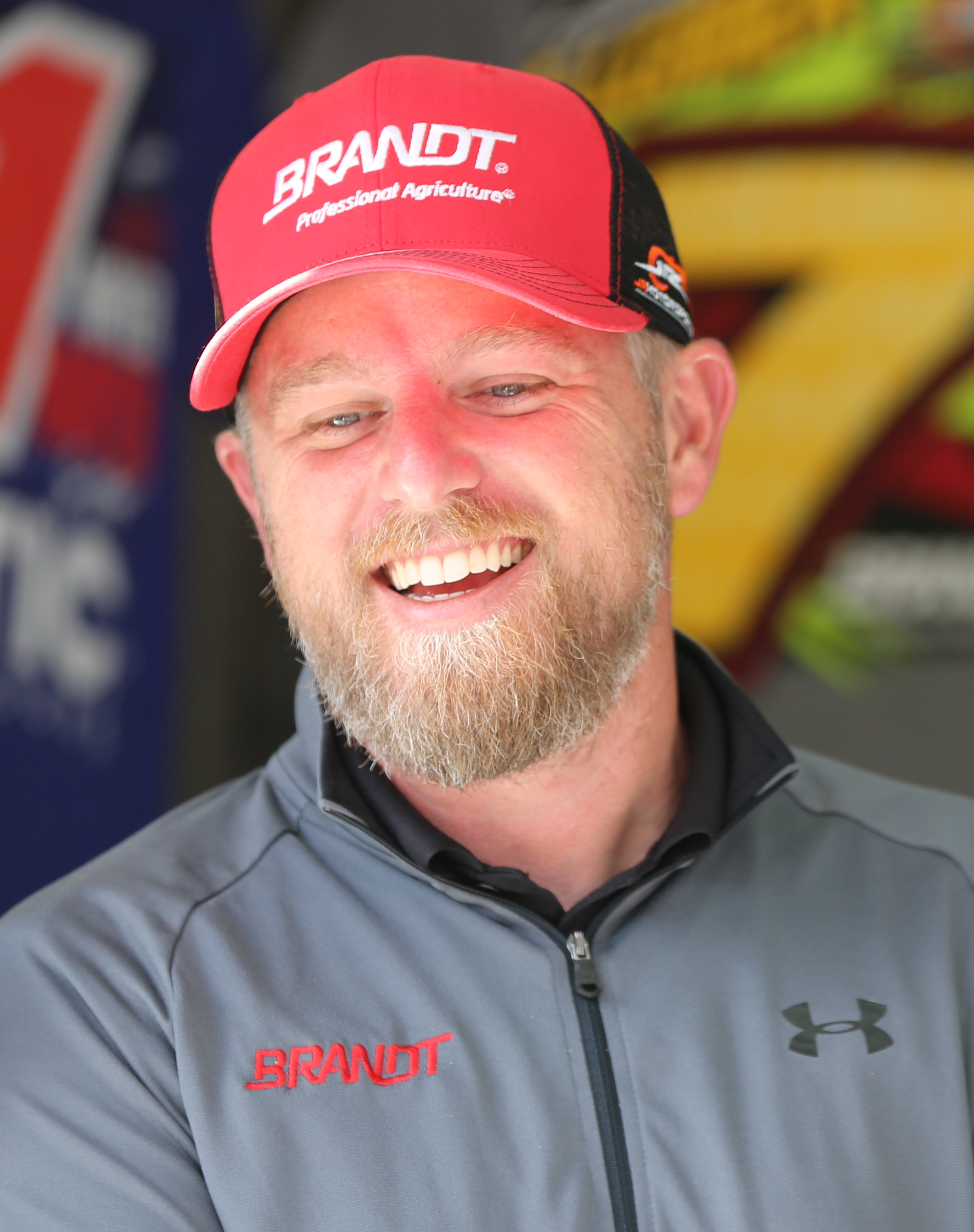
Justin Allgaier, the 2024 Xfinity Series champion.

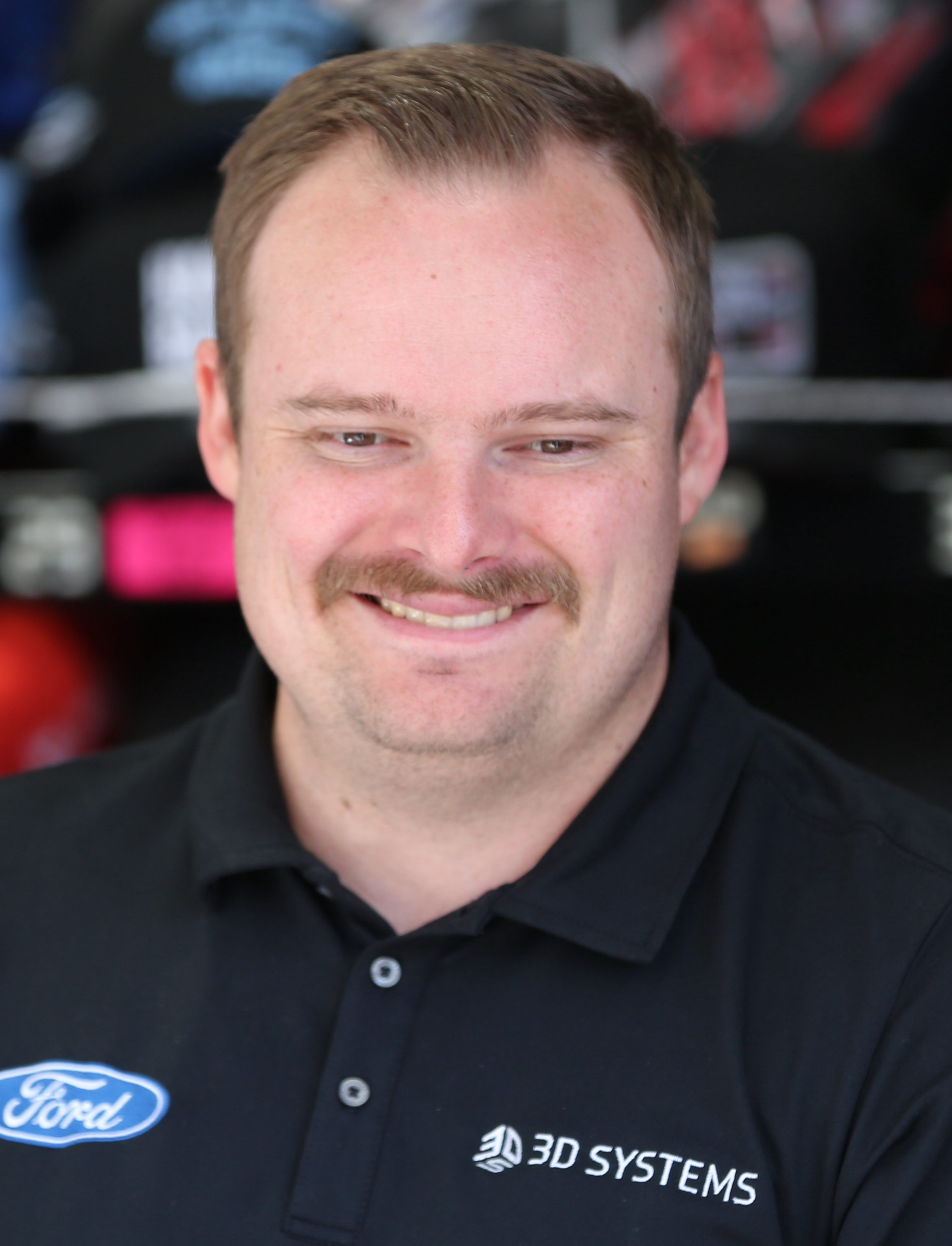
Cole Custer, the regular season champion, finished second in the standings.

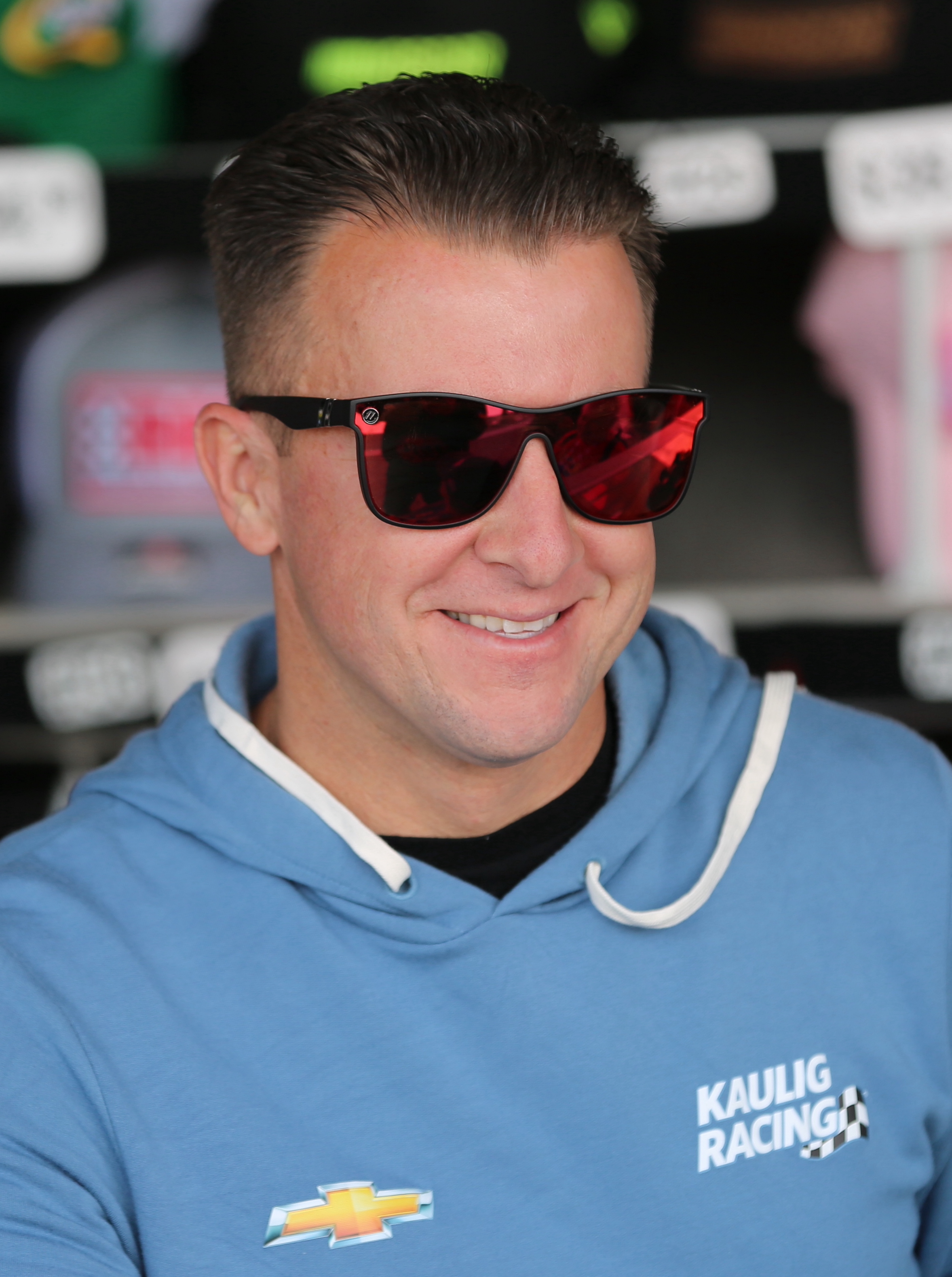
A. J. Allmendinger finished third in the standings.

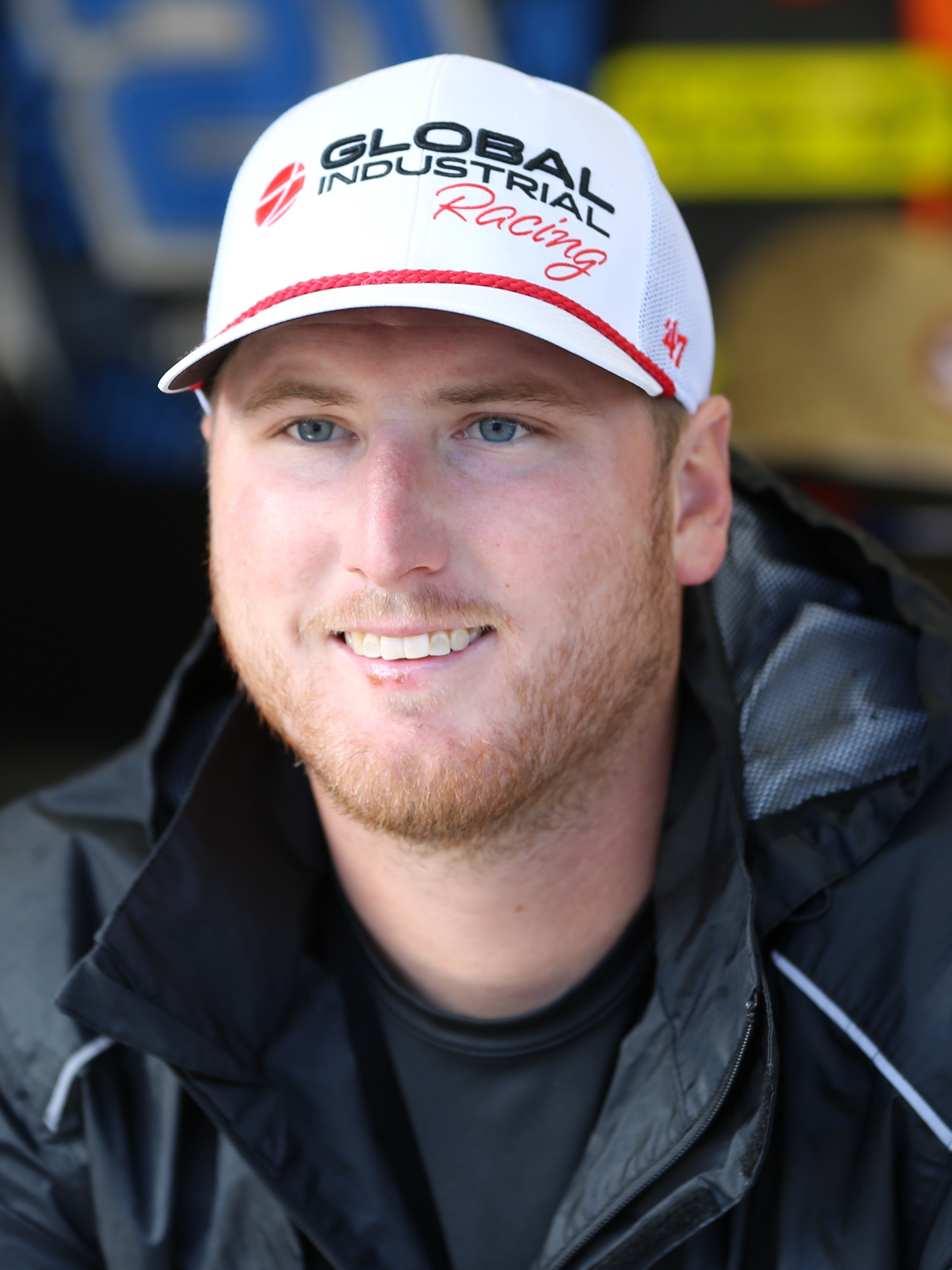
Austin Hill finished fourth in the standings.

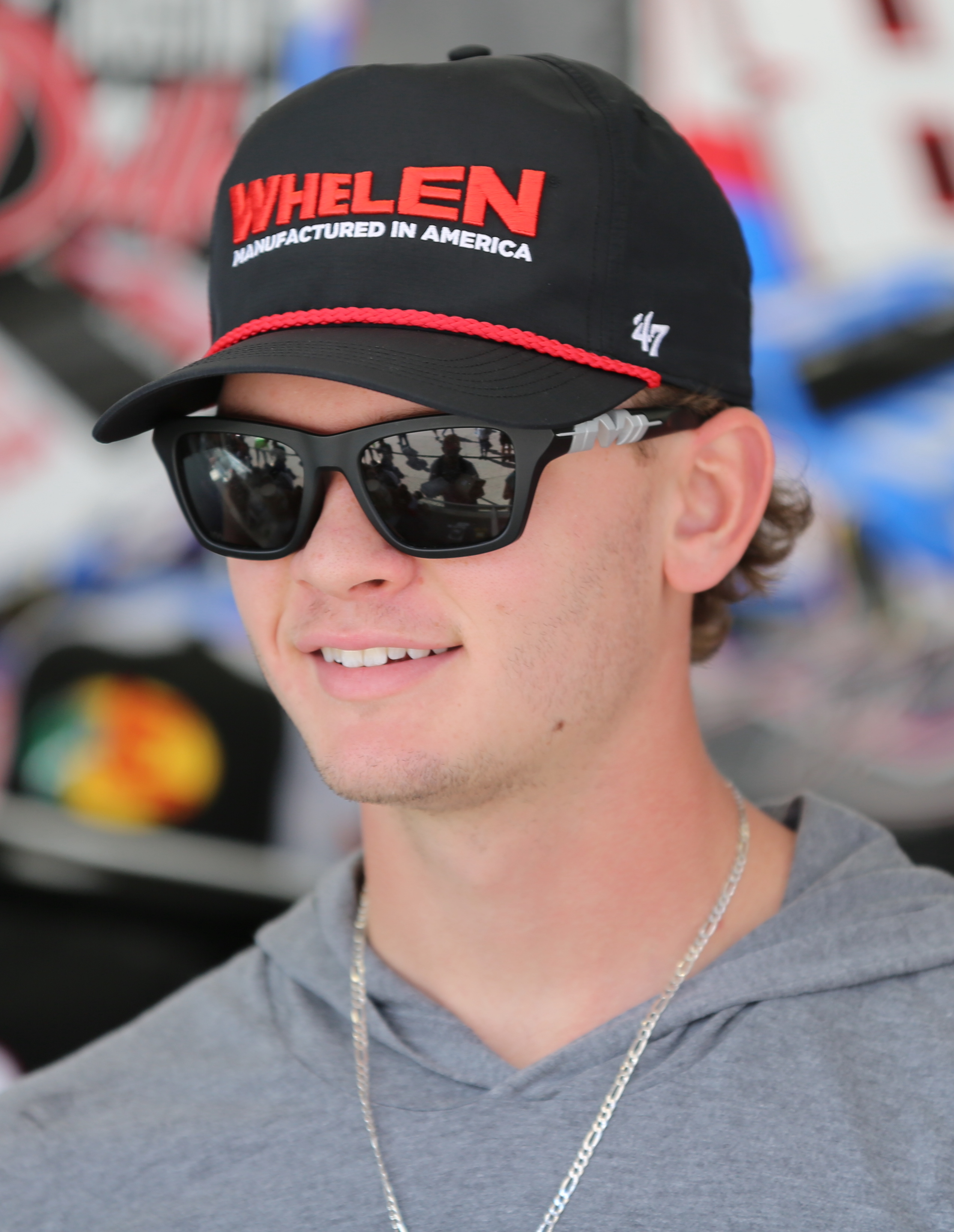
Jesse Love, the 2024 NASCAR Rookie of the Year.

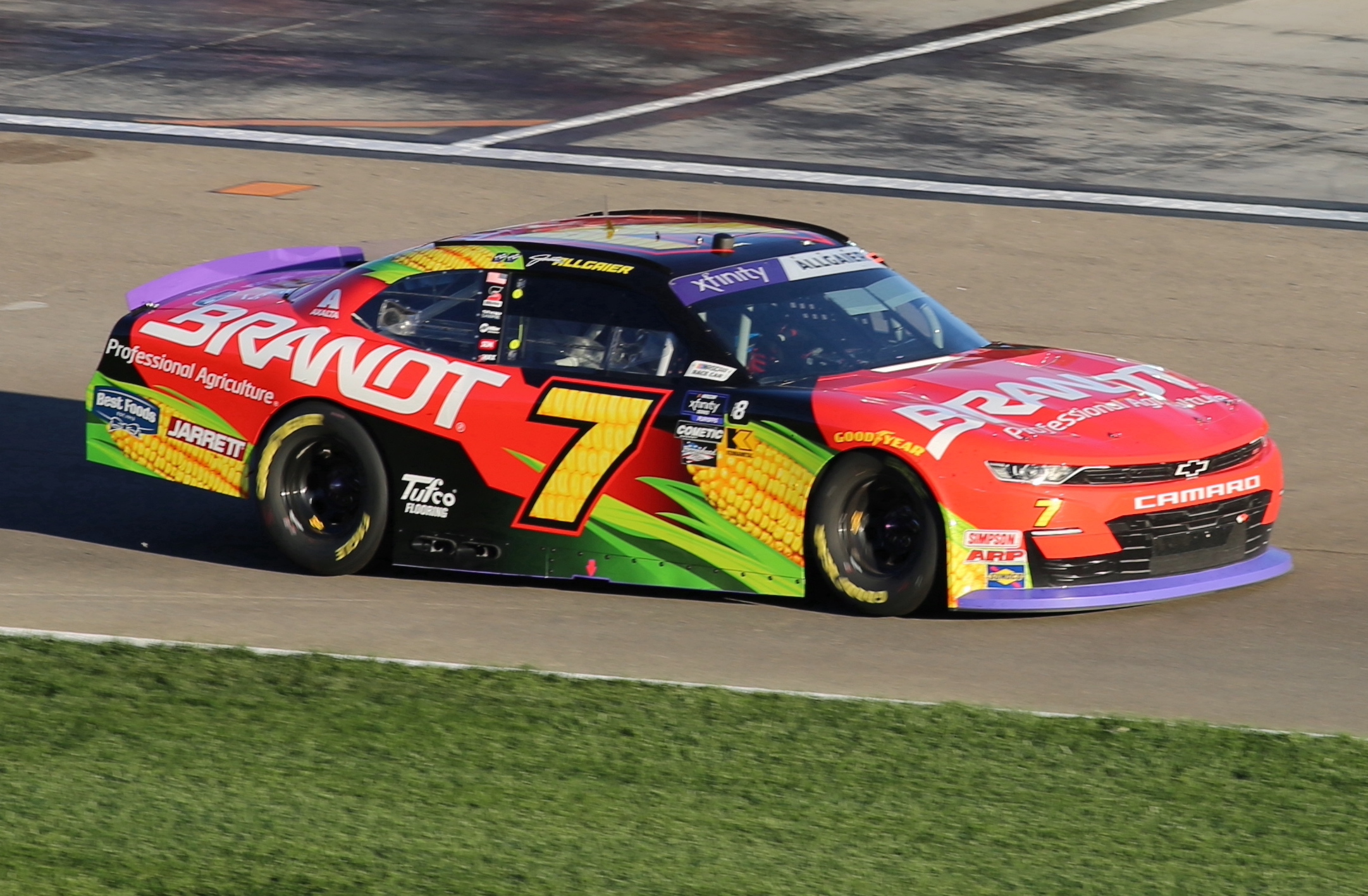
Chevrolet won the Xfinity Series manufacturers' championship with 1228 points and 18 wins. The JR Motorsports No. 7 car driven by Justin Allgaier won the owners' championship.

The 2024 NASCAR Xfinity Series was the 43rd season of the NASCAR Xfinity Series, a stock car racing series sanctioned by NASCAR in the United States. The season started on February 19 with the United Rentals 300 at Daytona International Speedway and ended with the NASCAR Xfinity Series Championship Race on November 9 at Phoenix Raceway.

Cole Custer of Stewart–Haas Racing entered the season as the defending NASCAR Xfinity Series champion. Following the 2024 Food City 300 at Bristol Motor Speedway, Custer won the regular season championship. At season's end, Justin Allgaier of JR Motorsports became the 2024 Xfinity Series champion.

This season marked the final year of Fox and NBC's coverage of the Xfinity Series under the 2015–2024 TV contract. Beginning in 2025, The CW will assume exclusive broadcast rights for the entire Xfinity Series schedule as part of a new agreement running through 2031. As a prelude to this transition, it was announced in April 2024 that the final eight races of the 2024 season — including the regular season finale (the Food City 300), and all playoff races — would air on The CW. However, NBC Sports would continue producing the broadcasts for these races.

This season unexpectedly marked the last time that Kyle Busch made an appearance in the series before his sudden death 2 years later. Busch, the 2009 Nationwide Series Champion when Nationwide was the series sponsor at that time, led the all-time most wins in the series.

== Teams and drivers ==
=== Full-time teams ===
Manufacturer	Team	No.	Driver	Crew chief
Chevrolet	Alpha Prime Racing	43	Ryan Ellis	Mike Hillman Sr. 6 Keith Wolfe 27
Chevrolet	Alpha Prime Racing	44	Brennan Poole	Frank Kerr
Chevrolet	Big Machine Racing	48	Parker Kligerman	Patrick Donahue
Chevrolet	DGM Racing	91	Kyle Weatherman 29	Mario Gosselin
Chevrolet	DGM Racing	91	Josh Bilicki 2	Mario Gosselin
Chevrolet	DGM Racing	91	Alex Labbé 1	Mario Gosselin
Chevrolet	DGM Racing	91	Myatt Snider 1	Mario Gosselin
Chevrolet	DGM Racing	92	Josh Bilicki 13	Bryan Berry 32; Nathan Kennedy 1
Chevrolet	DGM Racing	92	Nick Leitz 6	Bryan Berry 32; Nathan Kennedy 1
Chevrolet	DGM Racing	92	Dexter Bean 1	Bryan Berry 32; Nathan Kennedy 1
Chevrolet	DGM Racing	92	Kaden Honeycutt 1	Bryan Berry 32; Nathan Kennedy 1
Chevrolet	DGM Racing	92	Natalie Decker 1	Bryan Berry 32; Nathan Kennedy 1
Chevrolet	DGM Racing	92	Nathan Byrd 2	Bryan Berry 32; Nathan Kennedy 1
Chevrolet	DGM Racing	92	Ross Chastain 4	Bryan Berry 32; Nathan Kennedy 1
Chevrolet	DGM Racing	92	Dawson Cram 5	Bryan Berry 32; Nathan Kennedy 1
Chevrolet	Jeremy Clements Racing	51	Jeremy Clements	Mark Setzer
Chevrolet	Jordan Anderson Racing	27	Jeb Burton	Shane Whitbeck
Chevrolet	Jordan Anderson Racing	31	Parker Retzlaff	Chad Kendrick
Chevrolet	JR Motorsports	1	Sam Mayer	Mardy Lindley 32; Andrew Overstreet 1
Chevrolet	JR Motorsports	7	Justin Allgaier	Jim Pohlman
Chevrolet	JR Motorsports	8	Sammy Smith	Adam Wall 23; Phillip Bell 10
Chevrolet	JR Motorsports	9	Brandon Jones	Phillip Bell 23; Adam Wall 10
Chevrolet	Kaulig Racing (Note: The No. 97 car was fielded in a collaboration with Trackhouse Racing.)	11	Josh Williams	Kevin Walter 20; Eddie Pardue 13
Chevrolet	Kaulig Racing	16	A. J. Allmendinger	Alex Yontz
Chevrolet	Kaulig Racing	97	Shane van Gisbergen (R)	Bruce Schlicker 20; Kevin Walter 13
Chevrolet	Our Motorsports	5	Anthony Alfredo	Joshua Graham
Chevrolet	Richard Childress Racing	2	Jesse Love (R)	Danny Stockman Jr.
Chevrolet	Richard Childress Racing	21	Austin Hill	Andy Street
Chevrolet	SS-Green Light Racing	07	Patrick Emerling 19	Paul Clapprood
Chevrolet	SS-Green Light Racing	07	Daniil Kvyat 1	Paul Clapprood
Chevrolet	SS-Green Light Racing	07	Myatt Snider 2	Paul Clapprood
Chevrolet	SS-Green Light Racing	07	Logan Bearden 1	Paul Clapprood
Chevrolet	SS-Green Light Racing	07	Alex Labbé 2	Paul Clapprood
Chevrolet	SS-Green Light Racing	07	Greg Van Alst 3	Paul Clapprood
Chevrolet	SS-Green Light Racing	07	C. J. McLaughlin 2	Paul Clapprood
Chevrolet	SS-Green Light Racing	07	Jade Buford 1	Paul Clapprood
Chevrolet	SS-Green Light Racing	07	Sage Karam 1	Paul Clapprood
Chevrolet	SS-Green Light Racing	07	Brad Perez 1	Paul Clapprood
Chevrolet	Young's Motorsports	42	Leland Honeyman (R)	Andrew Abbott
Ford	AM Racing	15	Hailie Deegan (R) 17	Joe Williams Jr. 12; Matt Lucas 17; Ryan London 4
Ford	AM Racing	15	Joey Logano 3	Joe Williams Jr. 12; Matt Lucas 17; Ryan London 4
Ford	AM Racing	15	Josh Berry 2	Joe Williams Jr. 12; Matt Lucas 17; Ryan London 4
Ford	AM Racing	15	Lawless Alan 2	Joe Williams Jr. 12; Matt Lucas 17; Ryan London 4
Ford	AM Racing	15	Gus Dean 1	Joe Williams Jr. 12; Matt Lucas 17; Ryan London 4
Ford	AM Racing	15	Logan Bearden 2	Joe Williams Jr. 12; Matt Lucas 17; Ryan London 4
Ford	AM Racing	15	Dylan Lupton 6	Joe Williams Jr. 12; Matt Lucas 17; Ryan London 4
Ford	RSS Racing	28	Kyle Sieg 27	Mike Scearce 13; R. B. Bracken 1 Joe Williams Jr. 14; Matt Noyce 5
Ford	RSS Racing	28	Kaz Grala 1	Mike Scearce 13; R. B. Bracken 1 Joe Williams Jr. 14; Matt Noyce 5
Ford	RSS Racing	28	Ryan Sieg 5	Mike Scearce 13; R. B. Bracken 1 Joe Williams Jr. 14; Matt Noyce 5
Ford	RSS Racing	29	Blaine Perkins	Steve Addington
Ford	RSS Racing	39	Ryan Sieg 28	Matt Noyce 28; Joe Williams Jr. 5
Ford	RSS Racing	39	Kyle Sieg 5	Matt Noyce 28; Joe Williams Jr. 5
Ford	Stewart–Haas Racing	00	Cole Custer	Jonathan Toney
Ford	Stewart–Haas Racing	98	Riley Herbst	Davin Restivo
Toyota	Joe Gibbs Racing	18	Sheldon Creed	Sam McAulay
Toyota	Joe Gibbs Racing	19	Ryan Truex 2	Seth Chavka 29; Tyler Allen 4
Toyota	Joe Gibbs Racing	19	Aric Almirola 2	Seth Chavka 29; Tyler Allen 4
Toyota	Joe Gibbs Racing	19	Ty Gibbs 5	Seth Chavka 29; Tyler Allen 4
Toyota	Joe Gibbs Racing	19	Taylor Gray 13	Seth Chavka 29; Tyler Allen 4
Toyota	Joe Gibbs Racing	19	Josh Bilicki 2	Seth Chavka 29; Tyler Allen 4
Toyota	Joe Gibbs Racing	19	Brett Moffitt 1	Seth Chavka 29; Tyler Allen 4
Toyota	Joe Gibbs Racing	19	Justin Bonsignore 1	Seth Chavka 29; Tyler Allen 4
Toyota	Joe Gibbs Racing	19	Joe Graf Jr. 4	Seth Chavka 29; Tyler Allen 4
Toyota	Joe Gibbs Racing	19	William Sawalich 3	Seth Chavka 29; Tyler Allen 4
Toyota	Joe Gibbs Racing	20	John Hunter Nemechek 10	Tyler Allen 29; Seth Chavka 4
Toyota	Joe Gibbs Racing	20	Aric Almirola 12	Tyler Allen 29; Seth Chavka 4
Toyota	Joe Gibbs Racing	20	Ty Gibbs 1	Tyler Allen 29; Seth Chavka 4
Toyota	Joe Gibbs Racing	20	Ryan Truex 8	Tyler Allen 29; Seth Chavka 4
Toyota	Joe Gibbs Racing	20	Christopher Bell 2	Tyler Allen 29; Seth Chavka 4
Toyota	Joe Gibbs Racing	81	Chandler Smith	Jeff Meendering
Toyota	Sam Hunt Racing	26	Sage Karam 4	Kris Bowen
Toyota	Sam Hunt Racing	26	Jeffrey Earnhardt 6	Kris Bowen
Toyota	Sam Hunt Racing	26	Corey Heim 13	Kris Bowen
Toyota	Sam Hunt Racing	26	John Hunter Nemechek 1	Kris Bowen
Toyota	Sam Hunt Racing	26	Dean Thompson 2	Kris Bowen
Toyota	Sam Hunt Racing	26	Ed Jones 3	Kris Bowen
Toyota	Sam Hunt Racing	26	Tyler Reddick 1	Kris Bowen
Toyota	Sam Hunt Racing	26	Conor Daly 1	Kris Bowen
Toyota	Sam Hunt Racing	26	Ryan Truex 1	Kris Bowen
Toyota	Sam Hunt Racing	26	Bubba Pollard 1	Kris Bowen
Chevrolet 19 Ford 14	SS-Green Light Racing	14	Daniel Suárez 1 (Note: It was a Kaulig Racing entry using SS-Green Light Racing's owner points.)	Jason Miller 31; Rusty Ebersole 2
Chevrolet 19 Ford 14	SS-Green Light Racing	14	J. J. Yeley 6	Jason Miller 31; Rusty Ebersole 2
Chevrolet 19 Ford 14	SS-Green Light Racing	14	R. C. Enerson 2	Jason Miller 31; Rusty Ebersole 2
Chevrolet 19 Ford 14	SS-Green Light Racing	14	Logan Bearden 3	Jason Miller 31; Rusty Ebersole 2
Chevrolet 19 Ford 14	SS-Green Light Racing	14	David Starr 7	Jason Miller 31; Rusty Ebersole 2
Chevrolet 19 Ford 14	SS-Green Light Racing	14	Mason Massey 3	Jason Miller 31; Rusty Ebersole 2
Chevrolet 19 Ford 14	SS-Green Light Racing	14	Andre Castro 2 (Note: Entry is fielded in collaboration with Jesse Iwuji Motorsports.)	Jason Miller 31; Rusty Ebersole 2
Chevrolet 19 Ford 14	SS-Green Light Racing	14	Brad Perez 1	Jason Miller 31; Rusty Ebersole 2
Chevrolet 19 Ford 14	SS-Green Light Racing	14	Chad Finchum 3	Jason Miller 31; Rusty Ebersole 2
Chevrolet 19 Ford 14	SS-Green Light Racing	14	C. J. McLaughlin 1	Jason Miller 31; Rusty Ebersole 2
Chevrolet 19 Ford 14	SS-Green Light Racing	14	Nathan Byrd 1	Jason Miller 31; Rusty Ebersole 2
Chevrolet 19 Ford 14	SS-Green Light Racing	14	Austin Green 1	Jason Miller 31; Rusty Ebersole 2
Chevrolet 19 Ford 14	SS-Green Light Racing	14	Greg Van Alst 2	Jason Miller 31; Rusty Ebersole 2
Ford 5 Chevrolet 22 Toyota 6	Joey Gase Motorsports	35	Frankie Muniz 3	Wayne Carroll Jr. 13; Scott Eggleston 2 Mike Hillman Sr. 16; Mike Tyska 2
Ford 5 Chevrolet 22 Toyota 6	Joey Gase Motorsports	35	Joey Gase 11	Wayne Carroll Jr. 13; Scott Eggleston 2 Mike Hillman Sr. 16; Mike Tyska 2
Ford 5 Chevrolet 22 Toyota 6	Joey Gase Motorsports	35	Alex Labbé 1	Wayne Carroll Jr. 13; Scott Eggleston 2 Mike Hillman Sr. 16; Mike Tyska 2
Ford 5 Chevrolet 22 Toyota 6	Joey Gase Motorsports	35	Akinori Ogata 4	Wayne Carroll Jr. 13; Scott Eggleston 2 Mike Hillman Sr. 16; Mike Tyska 2
Ford 5 Chevrolet 22 Toyota 6	Joey Gase Motorsports	35	J. J. Yeley 1	Wayne Carroll Jr. 13; Scott Eggleston 2 Mike Hillman Sr. 16; Mike Tyska 2
Ford 5 Chevrolet 22 Toyota 6	Joey Gase Motorsports	35	Chad Finchum 1	Wayne Carroll Jr. 13; Scott Eggleston 2 Mike Hillman Sr. 16; Mike Tyska 2
Ford 5 Chevrolet 22 Toyota 6	Joey Gase Motorsports	35	Sage Karam 1	Wayne Carroll Jr. 13; Scott Eggleston 2 Mike Hillman Sr. 16; Mike Tyska 2
Ford 5 Chevrolet 22 Toyota 6	Joey Gase Motorsports	35	Glen Reen 1	Wayne Carroll Jr. 13; Scott Eggleston 2 Mike Hillman Sr. 16; Mike Tyska 2
Ford 5 Chevrolet 22 Toyota 6	Joey Gase Motorsports	35	Logan Bearden 1	Wayne Carroll Jr. 13; Scott Eggleston 2 Mike Hillman Sr. 16; Mike Tyska 2
Ford 5 Chevrolet 22 Toyota 6	Joey Gase Motorsports	35	Brad Perez 1	Wayne Carroll Jr. 13; Scott Eggleston 2 Mike Hillman Sr. 16; Mike Tyska 2
Ford 5 Chevrolet 22 Toyota 6	Joey Gase Motorsports	35	Stephen Mallozzi 1	Wayne Carroll Jr. 13; Scott Eggleston 2 Mike Hillman Sr. 16; Mike Tyska 2
Ford 5 Chevrolet 22 Toyota 6	Joey Gase Motorsports	35	David Starr 1	Wayne Carroll Jr. 13; Scott Eggleston 2 Mike Hillman Sr. 16; Mike Tyska 2
Ford 5 Chevrolet 22 Toyota 6	Joey Gase Motorsports	35	Mason Maggio 1	Wayne Carroll Jr. 13; Scott Eggleston 2 Mike Hillman Sr. 16; Mike Tyska 2
Ford 5 Chevrolet 22 Toyota 6	Joey Gase Motorsports	35	Thomas Annunziata 2	Wayne Carroll Jr. 13; Scott Eggleston 2 Mike Hillman Sr. 16; Mike Tyska 2
Ford 5 Chevrolet 22 Toyota 6	Joey Gase Motorsports	35	Carson Ware 2	Wayne Carroll Jr. 13; Scott Eggleston 2 Mike Hillman Sr. 16; Mike Tyska 2
Ford 5 Chevrolet 22 Toyota 6	Joey Gase Motorsports	35	Armani Williams 1	Wayne Carroll Jr. 13; Scott Eggleston 2 Mike Hillman Sr. 16; Mike Tyska 2

=== Part-time teams ===
Manufacturer	Team	No.	Driver	Crew chief	Races
Chevrolet	Alpha Prime Racing	45	Caesar Bacarella (Note: At Talladega in October (race #28), Caesar Bacarella experienced a mechanical issue in qualifying and was replaced by Tommy Joe Martins in the race.)	Teddy Brown 1 Keith Wolfe 1 Derek Peebles 1 Pat Tryson 3 Kase Kallenbach 12	5
Chevrolet	Alpha Prime Racing	45	Brad Perez	Teddy Brown 1 Keith Wolfe 1 Derek Peebles 1 Pat Tryson 3 Kase Kallenbach 12	3
Chevrolet	Alpha Prime Racing	45	Alon Day	Teddy Brown 1 Keith Wolfe 1 Derek Peebles 1 Pat Tryson 3 Kase Kallenbach 12	2
Chevrolet	Alpha Prime Racing	45	Garrett Smithley	Teddy Brown 1 Keith Wolfe 1 Derek Peebles 1 Pat Tryson 3 Kase Kallenbach 12	5
Chevrolet	Alpha Prime Racing	45	Stefan Parsons	Teddy Brown 1 Keith Wolfe 1 Derek Peebles 1 Pat Tryson 3 Kase Kallenbach 12	2
Chevrolet	Alpha Prime Racing	45	Tommy Joe Martins	Teddy Brown 1 Keith Wolfe 1 Derek Peebles 1 Pat Tryson 3 Kase Kallenbach 12	1
Chevrolet	Alpha Prime Racing	45	Mason Maggio	Teddy Brown 1 Keith Wolfe 1 Derek Peebles 1 Pat Tryson 3 Kase Kallenbach 12	1
Chevrolet	B. J. McLeod Motorsports	78	B. J. McLeod	Pat Tryson	4
Chevrolet	DGM Racing	36	Natalie Decker	B. J. Tucker 1 Dan Pardus 1 Nathan Kennedy 2	1
Chevrolet	DGM Racing	36	Preston Pardus	B. J. Tucker 1 Dan Pardus 1 Nathan Kennedy 2	1
Chevrolet	DGM Racing	36	Daniel Suárez	B. J. Tucker 1 Dan Pardus 1 Nathan Kennedy 2	1
Chevrolet	DGM Racing	36	Kyle Weatherman	B. J. Tucker 1 Dan Pardus 1 Nathan Kennedy 2	1
Chevrolet	Hendrick Motorsports	17	William Byron	Brandon McSwain	4
Chevrolet	Hendrick Motorsports	17	Kyle Larson	Greg Ives	2
Chevrolet	Hendrick Motorsports	17	Chase Elliott	Greg Ives	2
Chevrolet	Hendrick Motorsports	17	Boris Said	Greg Ives	1
Chevrolet	Hendrick Motorsports	17	Alex Bowman	Greg Ives	1
Chevrolet	JD Motorsports	4	Dawson Cram (R)	Kase Kallenbach 9 Alex Bird 3 Kevin Cram 6	13
Chevrolet	JD Motorsports	4	Patrick Gallagher	Kase Kallenbach 9 Alex Bird 3 Kevin Cram 6	1
Chevrolet	JD Motorsports	4	Garrett Smithley	Kase Kallenbach 9 Alex Bird 3 Kevin Cram 6	3
Chevrolet	JD Motorsports	4	Ty Dillon	Kase Kallenbach 9 Alex Bird 3 Kevin Cram 6	1
Chevrolet	JD Motorsports	4	Thomas Annunziata	Kase Kallenbach 9 Alex Bird 3 Kevin Cram 6	1
Chevrolet	Jordan Anderson Racing	32	Jordan Anderson	Larry McReynolds 4 (Note: Larry McReynolds, a commentator for NASCAR on Fox, crew chiefed the No. 32 car in practice and qualifying for the race (#1) at Daytona, but after the race was postponed from Saturday to Monday, he had to return to Fox's Charlotte studio to commentate the Daytona 500 which was also postponed to Monday and was therefore unable to crew chief the No. 32 car in the race. Car chief Jon Marlott filled in for him as crew chief in the race, which is why they are both listed for that race.); Jon Marlott 3	5
Chevrolet	Jordan Anderson Racing	32	Sage Karam	Larry McReynolds 4 Jon Marlott 3	1
Chevrolet	Jordan Anderson Racing	32	Ryan Vargas (Note: Entries were fielded in a collaboration with Mike Harmon Racing.)	Mike Harmon	2
Chevrolet	Jordan Anderson Racing	32	Austin Green (Note: Entries were fielded in a collaboration with Peterson Racing Group.)	Jody Measamer	7
Chevrolet	Jordan Anderson Racing	87	Mike Skeen	Kevin Allen	1
Chevrolet	JR Motorsports	88	Bubba Pollard	Andrew Overstreet	1
Chevrolet	JR Motorsports	88	Carson Kvapil	Andrew Overstreet	9
Chevrolet	JR Motorsports	88	Connor Mosack	Andrew Overstreet	2
Chevrolet	JR Motorsports	88	Connor Zilisch	Andrew Overstreet	4
Chevrolet	JR Motorsports	88	Dale Earnhardt Jr.	Andrew Overstreet	1
Chevrolet	Kaulig Racing	10	Daniel Dye	Philippe Lopez	10
Chevrolet	Mike Harmon Racing	74	Stanton Barrett	George Church 1 Mike Harmon 12; Mike Hillman Sr. 1	1
Chevrolet	Mike Harmon Racing	74	Ryan Vargas	George Church 1 Mike Harmon 12; Mike Hillman Sr. 1	3
Chevrolet	Mike Harmon Racing	74	Jade Buford	George Church 1 Mike Harmon 12; Mike Hillman Sr. 1	3
Chevrolet	Mike Harmon Racing	74	Dawson Cram	George Church 1 Mike Harmon 12; Mike Hillman Sr. 1	5
Chevrolet	Mike Harmon Racing	74	Tim Viens	George Church 1 Mike Harmon 12; Mike Hillman Sr. 1	1
Chevrolet	Mike Harmon Racing	74	Logan Bearden	George Church 1 Mike Harmon 12; Mike Hillman Sr. 1	1
Chevrolet	Pardus Racing Inc.	50	Preston Pardus	Dan Pardus	5
Chevrolet	Richard Childress Racing	33	Kyle Busch	Keith Rodden	1
Ford	Rette Jones Racing	30	Noah Gragson	Mark Rette	4
Ford	RSS Racing (Note: Entries are fielded in collaboration with Viking Motorsports.)	38	C. J. McLaughlin	Kevin Johnson	4
Ford	RSS Racing	38	Matt DiBenedetto	Kevin Johnson	28
Toyota	Sam Hunt Racing	24	Ed Jones	Bronson Butcher	2
Chevrolet 4 Ford 8 Toyota 1	Joey Gase Motorsports	53	Joey Gase	Scott Eggleston 2 Brian Keselowski 1 Mike Hillman Sr. 3 Mike Tyska 7	4
Chevrolet 4 Ford 8 Toyota 1	Joey Gase Motorsports	53	Glen Reen	Scott Eggleston 2 Brian Keselowski 1 Mike Hillman Sr. 3 Mike Tyska 7	1
Chevrolet 4 Ford 8 Toyota 1	Joey Gase Motorsports	53	Kenko Miura	Scott Eggleston 2 Brian Keselowski 1 Mike Hillman Sr. 3 Mike Tyska 7	1
Chevrolet 4 Ford 8 Toyota 1	Joey Gase Motorsports	53	Morgen Baird	Scott Eggleston 2 Brian Keselowski 1 Mike Hillman Sr. 3 Mike Tyska 7	2
Chevrolet 4 Ford 8 Toyota 1	Joey Gase Motorsports	53	Garrett Smithley	Scott Eggleston 2 Brian Keselowski 1 Mike Hillman Sr. 3 Mike Tyska 7	2
Chevrolet 4 Ford 8 Toyota 1	Joey Gase Motorsports	53	Carson Ware	Scott Eggleston 2 Brian Keselowski 1 Mike Hillman Sr. 3 Mike Tyska 7	1
Chevrolet 4 Ford 8 Toyota 1	Joey Gase Motorsports	53	Thomas Annunziata	Scott Eggleston 2 Brian Keselowski 1 Mike Hillman Sr. 3 Mike Tyska 7	1
Chevrolet 4 Ford 8 Toyota 1	Joey Gase Motorsports	53	Mason Maggio	Scott Eggleston 2 Brian Keselowski 1 Mike Hillman Sr. 3 Mike Tyska 7	1
Chevrolet 17 Ford 1	JD Motorsports	6	Garrett Smithley (Note: Morgen Baird was scheduled to drive the No. 6 car at Richmond (race #6), however, he and his wife were on baby watch and Baird was replaced by Garrett Smithley.)	Dylan Roberts 11; Kase Kallenbach 6 Mike Hatch 1	13
Chevrolet 17 Ford 1	JD Motorsports	6	Ty Dillon	Dylan Roberts 11; Kase Kallenbach 6 Mike Hatch 1	1
Chevrolet 17 Ford 1	JD Motorsports	6	Patrick Gallagher	Dylan Roberts 11; Kase Kallenbach 6 Mike Hatch 1	1
Chevrolet 17 Ford 1	JD Motorsports	6	Thomas Annunziata	Dylan Roberts 11; Kase Kallenbach 6 Mike Hatch 1	2
Chevrolet 17 Ford 1	JD Motorsports	6	Armani Williams (Note: It was an MBM Motorsports entry using JD Motorsports' owner points.)	Dylan Roberts 11; Kase Kallenbach 6 Mike Hatch 1	1
Chevrolet 3 Ford 3	MBM Motorsports	13	David Starr	Carl Long 5 David Ingram 1	2
Chevrolet 3 Ford 3	MBM Motorsports	13	Chad Finchum	Carl Long 5 David Ingram 1	2
Chevrolet 3 Ford 3	MBM Motorsports	13	B. J. McLeod	Carl Long 5 David Ingram 1	1
Chevrolet 3 Ford 3	MBM Motorsports	13	Kyle Keller	Carl Long 5 David Ingram 1	1

== Other confirmed changes ==
=== Drivers ===
- On November 15, 2023, B. J. McLeod Motorsports announced that Anthony Alfredo would not return to the No. 78 car in 2024.
- On November 27, 2023, Sam Hunt Racing announced that Kaz Grala would not return to their No. 26 car in 2024.
- In June 2024, it was revealed that Joe Gibbs Racing indefinitely suspended Aric Almirola for instigating a physical altercation with Bubba Wallace during a weekly competition meeting that included both the drivers of JGR and 23XI Racing prior to the 2024 BetMGM 300 at Charlotte Motor Speedway; Ty Gibbs took over the JGR No. 20 car for that race.
- On July 8, 2024, AM Racing parted ways with Hailie Deegan. The No. 15 car has since been shared with multiple drivers, including Joey Logano and Josh Berry.

=== Crew chiefs ===
- On October 27, 2023, Jason Ratcliff announced in an interview on SiriusXM NASCAR Radio that he would be retiring as a crew chief after the 2023 season. He crew chiefed the No. 19 car for Joe Gibbs Racing in 2023. He spent the majority of his 24-year career in NASCAR with JGR crew chiefing in the Cup and Xfinity Series and became the winningest crew chief in Xfinity Series history. He also crew chiefed for Brewco Motorsports in the Xfinity Series early in his career. On December 13, Seth Chavka, the former engineer of JGR's No. 54 car in the Cup Series driven by Ty Gibbs who also served as an engineer and interim crew chief for JGR in the Cup Series for Kyle Busch when he drove the No. 18 car and Erik Jones when he drove the No. 20 car, was announced as Ratcliff's replacement as crew chief of the No. 19 Xfinity Series car.
- On November 13, 2023, it was announced that Ben Beshore, who crew chiefed Joe Gibbs Racing's No. 20 car driven by John Hunter Nemechek in 2023, would be moving up to the Cup Series with Nemechek in the Legacy Motor Club No. 42 car. On December 13, Tyler Allen, the former engineer of JGR's No. 20 car in the Cup Series driven by Christopher Bell, was announced as Beshore's replacement as crew chief of the No. 20 car.
- On November 28, 2023, JR Motorsports revealed that Jason Burdett would not return to the team as a crew chief in 2024. Burdett crew chiefed for JRM for nine years, his first eight were on the No. 7 car with Regan Smith in 2015 and Justin Allgaier from 2016 to 2022 and his last year was on the No. 9 car with Brandon Jones. On December 18, Phillip Bell, the former engineer of the No. 9 car in 2022 when it was driven by Noah Gragson, was announced as Burdett's replacement as crew chief of the No. 9 car, returning to JRM after 1 year as Gragson's engineer in the Cup Series for Legacy Motor Club.

=== Interim crew chiefs ===
- On February 27, 2024, Jason Miller, crew chief of the SS-Green Light Racing No. 14 car, was suspended for two races following a physical altercation with DGM Racing No. 91 car driver Kyle Weatherman after the 2024 Raptor King of Tough 250 at Atlanta Motor Speedway. Rusty Ebersole served as the interim crew chief at Las Vegas and Phoenix.

=== Manufacturers ===
- Ford Performance switched the decals to the 2024 Ford Mustang Dark Horse from the sixth generation Mustang decals for the 2024 season. The body, however, remained the same as the 2023 model.

== Schedule ==
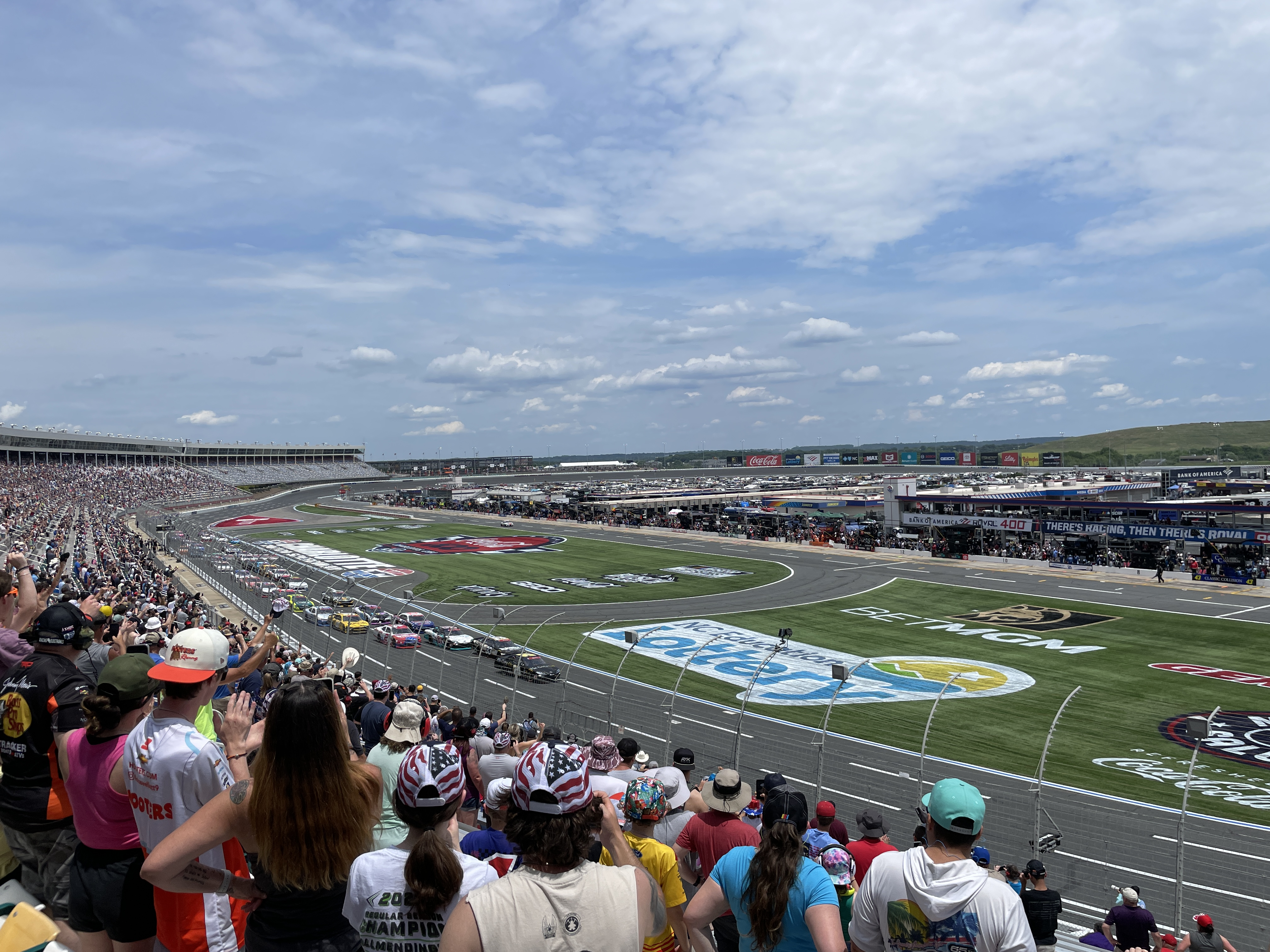
The BetMGM 300 at Charlotte Motor Speedway in May.

The entire schedule was released on October 4, 2023, consisting of 27 oval races, 5 road course races, and one street course race.

- The Dash 4 Cash races (the spring races at Martinsville, Texas, Talladega and Dover) are listed in **bold**.
O Oval track
R Road course
S Street course

No	Race title	Track	Location	Date	TV	Radio
1	United Rentals 300	O Daytona International Speedway	Daytona Beach, Florida	February 19 (Note: The United Rentals 300 was postponed from Saturday, February 17 to Monday, February 19 due to rain.)	FS1	MRN
2	Raptor King of Tough 250	O Atlanta Motor Speedway	Hampton, Georgia	February 24	FS1	PRN
3	The LiUNA!	O Las Vegas Motor Speedway	Las Vegas, Nevada	March 2	FS1	PRN
4	Call811.com Every Dig. Every Time. 200	O Phoenix Raceway	Avondale, Arizona	March 9	FS1	MRN
5	Focused Health 250	R Circuit of the Americas	Austin, Texas	March 23	FS1	PRN
6	ToyotaCare 250	O Richmond Raceway	Richmond, Virginia	March 30	FS1	MRN
7	**Dude Wipes 250**	O Martinsville Speedway	Ridgeway, Virginia	April 6	FS1	MRN
8	**Andy's Frozen Custard 300**	O Texas Motor Speedway	Fort Worth, Texas	April 13	FS1	PRN
9	**Ag-Pro 300**	O Talladega Superspeedway	Lincoln, Alabama	April 20	Fox	MRN
10	**BetRivers 200**	O Dover Motor Speedway	Dover, Delaware	April 27	FS1	PRN
11	Crown Royal Purple Bag Project 200	O Darlington Raceway	Darlington, South Carolina	May 11	FS1	MRN
12	BetMGM 300	O Charlotte Motor Speedway	Concord, North Carolina	May 25	Fox	PRN
13	Pacific Office Automation 147	R Portland International Raceway	Portland, Oregon	June 1	FS1	MRN
14	Zip Buy Now, Pay Later 250	R Sonoma Raceway	Sonoma, California	June 8	FS1	PRN
15	Hy-Vee PERKS 250	O Iowa Speedway	Newton, Iowa	June 15	USA	MRN
16	SciAps 200	O New Hampshire Motor Speedway	Loudon, New Hampshire	June 22	USA	PRN
17	Tennessee Lottery 250	O Nashville Superspeedway	Lebanon, Tennessee	June 29	USA	PRN
18	The Loop 110	S Chicago Street Course	Chicago, Illinois	July 6	NBC	MRN
19	Explore the Pocono Mountains 225	O Pocono Raceway	Long Pond, Pennsylvania	July 13	USA	MRN
20	Pennzoil 250	O Indianapolis Motor Speedway	Speedway, Indiana	July 20	USA	IMS
21	Cabo Wabo 250	O Michigan International Speedway	Brooklyn, Michigan	August 17	USA	MRN
22	Wawa 250 Powered by Coca-Cola	O Daytona International Speedway	Daytona Beach, Florida	August 23	USA	MRN
23	Sport Clips Haircuts VFW 200	O Darlington Raceway	Darlington, South Carolina	August 31	USA	MRN
24	Focused Health 250	O Atlanta Motor Speedway	Hampton, Georgia	September 7	USA	PRN
25	Mission 200 at The Glen	R Watkins Glen International	Watkins Glen, New York	September 14	USA	MRN
26	Food City 300	O Bristol Motor Speedway	Bristol, Tennessee	September 20	CW (Note: Although they would be broadcast on The CW, the races would be produced by NBC Sports with its own production and on-air teams.)	PRN
NASCAR Xfinity Series Playoffs
Round of 12
27	Kansas Lottery 300	O Kansas Speedway	Kansas City, Kansas	September 28	CW	MRN
28	United Rentals 250	O Talladega Superspeedway	Lincoln, Alabama	October 5	CW	MRN
29	Drive for the Cure 250	R Charlotte Motor Speedway (Roval)	Concord, North Carolina	October 12	CW	PRN
Round of 8
30	Ambetter Health 302	O Las Vegas Motor Speedway	Las Vegas, Nevada	October 19	CW	PRN
31	Credit One NASCAR Amex Credit Card 300	O Homestead-Miami Speedway	Homestead, Florida	October 26	CW	MRN
32	National Debt Relief 250	O Martinsville Speedway	Ridgeway, Virginia	November 2	CW	MRN
Championship 4
33	NASCAR Xfinity Series Championship Race	O Phoenix Raceway	Avondale, Arizona	November 9	CW	MRN

== Results and standings ==
=== Race results ===
No.	Race	Pole position	Most laps led	Winning driver	Winning team	No.	Manufacturer	Report
1	United Rentals 300	Jesse Love	Jesse Love	Austin Hill	Richard Childress Racing	21	Chevrolet	Report
2	Raptor King of Tough 250	Jesse Love	Jesse Love	Austin Hill	Richard Childress Racing	21	Chevrolet	Report
3	The LiUNA!	Cole Custer	John Hunter Nemechek	John Hunter Nemechek	Joe Gibbs Racing	20	Toyota	Report
4	Call811.com Every Dig. Every Time. 200	Cole Custer	Chandler Smith	Chandler Smith	Joe Gibbs Racing	81	Toyota	Report
5	Focused Health 250	Kyle Larson	A. J. Allmendinger; Shane van Gisbergen (Note: Allmendinger and van Gisbergen both led 20 laps.)	Kyle Larson	Hendrick Motorsports	17	Chevrolet	Report
6	ToyotaCare 250	Parker Retzlaff	Aric Almirola	Chandler Smith	Joe Gibbs Racing	81	Toyota	Report
7	Dude Wipes 250	Brandon Jones	Aric Almirola	Aric Almirola	Joe Gibbs Racing	20	Toyota	Report
8	Andy's Frozen Custard 300	Jesse Love	Justin Allgaier	Sam Mayer	JR Motorsports	1	Chevrolet	Report
9	Ag-Pro 300	Austin Hill	Austin Hill	Jesse Love	Richard Childress Racing	2	Chevrolet	Report
10	BetRivers 200	Brandon Jones	Cole Custer	Ryan Truex	Joe Gibbs Racing	20	Toyota	Report
11	Crown Royal Purple Bag Project 200	Cole Custer	Justin Allgaier	Justin Allgaier	JR Motorsports	7	Chevrolet	Report
12	BetMGM 300	Ty Gibbs	Sam Mayer	Chase Elliott	Hendrick Motorsports	17	Chevrolet	Report
13	Pacific Office Automation 147	Sam Mayer	Justin Allgaier	Shane van Gisbergen	Kaulig Racing	97	Chevrolet	Report
14	Zip Buy Now, Pay Later 250	Shane van Gisbergen	Shane van Gisbergen	Shane van Gisbergen	Kaulig Racing	97	Chevrolet	Report
15	Hy-Vee PERKS 250	Austin Hill	Chandler Smith	Sam Mayer	JR Motorsports	1	Chevrolet	Report
16	SciAps 200	Cole Custer	Cole Custer	Christopher Bell	Joe Gibbs Racing	20	Toyota	Report
17	Tennessee Lottery 250	Ty Gibbs	John Hunter Nemechek	John Hunter Nemechek	Joe Gibbs Racing	20	Toyota	Report
18	The Loop 110	Shane van Gisbergen	Shane van Gisbergen; Jesse Love (Note: van Gisbergen and Love both led 14 laps.)	Shane van Gisbergen	Kaulig Racing	97	Chevrolet	Report
19	Explore the Pocono Mountains 225	Sheldon Creed	Justin Allgaier	Cole Custer	Stewart–Haas Racing	00	Ford	Report
20	Pennzoil 250	Cole Custer	Cole Custer	Riley Herbst	Stewart–Haas Racing	98	Ford	Report
21	Cabo Wabo 250	Sheldon Creed	Justin Allgaier	Justin Allgaier	JR Motorsports	7	Chevrolet	Report
22	Wawa 250	Chandler Smith	A. J. Allmendinger	Ryan Truex	Joe Gibbs Racing	20	Toyota	Report
23	Sport Clips Haircuts VFW 200	Christopher Bell	Christopher Bell	Christopher Bell	Joe Gibbs Racing	20	Toyota	Report
24	Focused Health 250	Jesse Love	A. J. Allmendinger	Austin Hill	Richard Childress Racing	21	Chevrolet	Report
25	Mission 200 at The Glen	Connor Zilisch	Connor Zilisch	Connor Zilisch	JR Motorsports	88	Chevrolet	Report
26	Food City 300	Chandler Smith	Cole Custer	Cole Custer	Stewart–Haas Racing	00	Ford	Report
NASCAR Xfinity Series Playoffs
Round of 12
27	Kansas Lottery 300	Brandon Jones	Chandler Smith	Aric Almirola	Joe Gibbs Racing	20	Toyota	Report
28	United Rentals 250	Jesse Love	Jesse Love	Sammy Smith	JR Motorsports	8	Chevrolet	Report
29	Drive for the Cure 250	Shane van Gisbergen	A. J. Allmendinger	Sam Mayer	JR Motorsports	1	Chevrolet	Report
Round of 8
30	Ambetter Health 302	Brandon Jones	A. J. Allmendinger	A. J. Allmendinger	Kaulig Racing	16	Chevrolet	Report
31	Credit One NASCAR Amex Credit Card 300	Chandler Smith	Austin Hill	Austin Hill	Richard Childress Racing	21	Chevrolet	Report
32	National Debt Relief 250	Parker Retzlaff	Aric Almirola	Aric Almirola	Joe Gibbs Racing	20	Toyota	Report
Championship 4
33	NASCAR Xfinity Series Championship Race	William Sawalich	Riley Herbst	Riley Herbst	Stewart–Haas Racing	98	Ford	Report

=== Drivers' championship ===
(key) Bold – Pole position awarded by time. Italics – Pole position set by competition-based formula. * – Most laps led. ^{1} – Stage 1 winner. ^{2} – Stage 2 winner ^{1–10} – Regular season top 10 finishers.
. – Eliminated after Round of 12 . – Eliminated after Round of 8

Pos	Driver	DAY	ATL	LVS	PHO	COA	RCH	MAR	TEX	TAL	DOV	DAR	CLT	PIR	SON	IOW	NHA	NSH	CSC	POC	IND	MCH	DAY	DAR	ATL	GLN	BRI	KAN	TAL	ROV	LVS	HOM	MAR	PHO	Pts.	Stage	Bonus
1	Justin Allgaier	8	28	10	29	13	11	5^{2}	3*^{12}	38	17^{1}	1*^{12}	33^{12}	2*^{12}	6	30	4	8	9	2*^{1}	9	1*	7^{12}	10	30^{1}	17	30	36	25	7^{2}	3^{2}	8	5	2	4035	–	35^{2}
2	Cole Custer	13	16	**2**	**5**^{2}	4	10	8	5	10	5*^{2}	3	32	6	9	6	3*	9	18	1^{2}	**2***	30	32	2	31	21	1*	2	26	13	8^{1}	2	4	8	4029	–	29^{1}
3	A. J. Allmendinger	10	13	6	18	10*	14	36	4	19	6	35	5	4	17	37	11	7	11	6	8	10	24*	27	3*^{2}	3	10	17	11	2*^{1}	1*	10	38	9	4028	–	12^{6}
4	Austin Hill	1^{2}	1	4	4	2	8	34	6	**14***^{2}	15	2	25	11	5	29	24	4	7^{2}	7	6	18	31	9	1	33	14	7	23^{2}	4	10	1*^{12}	14	10	4027	–	26^{4}
NASCAR Xfinity Series Playoffs cut-off
Pos	Driver	DAY	ATL	LVS	PHO	COA	RCH	MAR	TEX	TAL	DOV	DAR	CLT	PIR	SON	IOW	NHA	NSH	CSC	POC	IND	MCH	DAY	DAR	ATL	GLN	BRI	KAN	TAL	ROV	LVS	HOM	MAR	PHO	Pts.	Stage	Bonus
5	Chandler Smith	5	2	3^{12}	1*^{1}	8	1	3	15	25	7	12	18	35	7	8*^{12}	15	2	38	15	33	27	**2**	8	4	4	**3**^{1}	3*	5^{1}	5	4	**13**	3	5	2314	32	25^{3}
6	Sheldon Creed	2	4	26	3	32	35	6	19	6	4	9	36	13	2	5	2	33	26	**4**	5	2	8	3^{2}	25	2	2	5	4	35	9	5	6	7	2264	69	7^{5}
7	Riley Herbst	6	15	5	24	34^{2}	13	25	27	2	16	7	38	10	13	2	8	6	28	11	1^{1}	38	4	35	26	13	13	10	3	32	7	6	11	1*^{12}	2254	51	10^{8}
8	Jesse Love **(R)**	**20***^{1}	**12***^{12}	17	2	6	5	9	**9**	1^{1}	24	8	28	19	12	31	13	3	5*	22	13	29	21	6	**6**	8	4	9	**6***	19	6	4	12	6	2247	23	13^{7}
9	Sam Mayer	36	11	38	34	9	30	2	1	36	3	4	4*	**28**	3	1	19^{1}	10	19	10	37	37	13	28	36	20	9	13^{2}	38	1	14	9	30	11	2205	15	17
10	Parker Kligerman	25	19	11	8	5^{1}	7	12	25	29	12	6	37	8	10	11	7	16	4	8	12	11	3	13	2	7	16	12	12	6	5	11	8	14	2190	1	–2^{9}
11	Sammy Smith	23	10	8	9	36	9	7	8	21	33	34	3	3	33	4	12	30	13	9	18	5	23	5	7	19	15	22	1	10	32	22	2	15	2185	10	6^{10}
12	Shane van Gisbergen **(R)**	12	3	37	6	27*	14	11	18	22	18	15	15	1	**1***^{1}	34	18	15	**1***^{1}	31	4	17	25	7	27	5	18	8	35	**3**	38	17	28	12	2157	20	17
13	Ryan Sieg	22	22	7	12	14	32	17	2	17	37	13	7	14	20	12	6	11	16	12	11^{2}	13^{1}	5	18	32	22	8	16	2	17	2	7	15	23	856	122	2
14	Brandon Jones	9	14	9	7	16	37	**27**	13	33	**19**	10	2	36	38	36	14	13	17	13	15	36	22	32	9	28	6	**6**	28	11	**17**	19	29	18	696	111	–
15	Anthony Alfredo	24	7	16	10	12	29	15	10	3	9	14	16	32	31	15	20	18	30	14	34	4	26	26	14	34	11	15	29	16	19	15	7	36	616	36	–
16	Brennan Poole	19	20	19	20	15	28	14	21	5	22	20	31	16	14	28	16	21	20	26	21	33	16	20	15	23	17	18	9	38	21	18	13	24	572	10	–
17	Aric Almirola			12	31		2*^{12}	1*^{1}				5									3					26		1^{1}	19	9	13	3	1*^{12}	3	560	169	4
18	Josh Williams	34	37	14	27	38	12	10	12	20	25	21	8	7	37	20	23	24	12	18	36	19	11	16	8	32	21	11	34	36	15	27	17	33	515	5	–
19	Jeb Burton	26	23	23	36	30	26	32	32	9	11	16	17	37	36	24	17	19	15	21	19	16	17	17	24	31	25	23	7	15	24	20	9	16	512	25	–
20	Jeremy Clements	29	6	25	15	19	24	22	16	35	14	37	13	30	22	21	21	22	37	30	30	15	27	31	29	18	12^{2}	27	36	20	18	16	27	20	477	18	1
21	Parker Retzlaff	3	5	35	35	11	**16**	37	22	30	10	31	14	9	11	32	26	17	34	33	35	20	34	36	12	14	37	21	30	12	22	23	**36**	34	468	22	–
22	Leland Honeyman **(R)**	30	21	18	11	20	20	31	31	4	21	30	23	26	29	13	37	25	31	25	20	12	9	23	17	16	31	25	14	28	37	30	35	31	457	8	–
23	Ryan Ellis	11	25	22	21	33	27	26	26	26	13	38	27	17	26	14	35	23	21	36	23	14	37	21	21	15	24	19	15	31	28	25	18	25	441	–	–
24	Kyle Sieg	DNQ	36	20	25		23	23	14	13	27	32	19	18	23	19	31	26	22	20	22	28	15	22	16	37	23	24	10	23	26	26	21	29	418	3	–
25	Kyle Weatherman	38	17	21	16	29	17	33	36	27	8	17	11	25	30	33	25	31	14	23	25	32	10	37	11	38	26	26	31		20	14			394	–	–
26	Matt DiBenedetto						18	21	20	8	32	25	26	31	21	7	38	29	23	24	16	7	33	19	35	35	34	14	16	22	16	38	16	26	393	3	–
27	Blaine Perkins	14	30	31	13	22	33	16	35	23	36	27	35	20	18	35	27	35	24	34	29	23	14	34	19	DNQ	22	28	18	33	31	34	19	22	350	–	–
28	Ryan Truex	21	9						7	34	1			27						19			1		10		5					21			319	59	10
29	Josh Bilicki	32				31	19		29	16		22		12	16				36	37	27	24	30			10	20			8				21	263	23	–
30	Carson Kvapil							4			2	19					5	12			10	26		14					27						227	13	–
31	Garrett Smithley	16	34	29	26		21	29	34	DNQ	30	29	24	22	27	26	29	36		Wth	31			30	23		36				29		32	30	191	–	–
32	Hailie Deegan **(R)**	37	27	15	33	23	31	18	23	12	31	36	20	33	32	25	32	28																	174	–	–
33	Connor Zilisch																									**1***^{1}		4				12		4	160	29	6
34	Austin Green					7								15	4				10							11	38			30		29			154	–	–
35	Patrick Emerling	17	33	28	38		36		33	32	28	33	30			23	34	38		32		22	18					30					23	28	150	–	–
36	Joey Gase	DNQ	29	30			34	28	30	18						16					24	31	20			RL^{‡}		32	21		30			27	148	–	–
37	David Starr	DNQ							28	24	26	24				17					26			24	22				8						134	–	–
38	Joe Graf Jr.																				17		12	11			19								93	4	–
39	J. J. Yeley		24	24	19						38		21															20			25				90	–	–
40	B. J. McLeod	15	18	32	14																28														78	–	–
41	Jordan Anderson	4	38							31													6						33						75	–	–
42	Dylan Lupton																												24	27	27	32	20	19	73	–	–
43	Ed Jones					35								5	15											24				37					71	1	–
44	Alex Labbé					26									19				29											14					69	9	–
45	Logan Bearden						22	30						29			Wth	32				25					27	33					34		65	1	–
46	Nick Leitz		26	27	17																				20				37			37			60	–	–
47	Myatt Snider							19																							23		10		59	–	–
48	Sage Karam	28		36		17								34	DNQ				33											29					59	14	–
49	Brad Perez					18									24				DNQ									37		26		28			53	–	–
50	C. J. McLaughlin	DNQ	35	33	DNQ																		19		34				17						47	–	–
51	Preston Pardus					DNQ								38	25				32											21			24		47	–	–
52	Caesar Bacarella	DNQ								7												9	29						QL^{¶}						46	–	–
53	Bubba Pollard						6																										31		37	–	–
54	Greg Van Alst																				32			29			29						26	37	33	–	–
55	Dale Earnhardt Jr.																										7								32	2	–
56	Natalie Decker	18								Wth			29																						27	–	–
57	Chad Finchum								38		DNQ	26						34						33			32								27	3	–
58	Carson Ware																										28	Wth	22				37		25	–	–
59	Justin Bonsignore																22																		25	10	–
60	Patrick Gallagher					25								24																					25	–	–
61	Tommy Joe Martins																												13						24	–	–
62	Thomas Annunziata														34				DNQ	28						29				34		36			24	–	–
63	Conor Daly																				14														23	–	–
64	R. C. Enerson					28																				27									19	–	–
65	Dexter Bean							20																											17	–	–
66	Daniil Kvyat					21																													16	–	–
67	Andre Castro													23					35																16	–	–
68	Ryan Vargas				37		38	DNQ																				29	Wth		34				13	–	–
69	Glen Reen															38	28																		10	–	–
70	Boris Said														28																				9	–	–
71	Mike Skeen																									30									7	–	–
72	Armani Williams																33															35			6	–	–
73	Morgen Baird						Wth															DNQ			33										4	–	–
74	Tim Viens																						35												2	–	–
75	Gus Dean																						36												1	–	–
76	Alon Day																		DNQ							36									1	–	–
	Stanton Barrett	DNQ																																	0	–	–
	Jade Buford												DNQ				DNQ	DNQ		Wth						DNQ									0	–	–
	Kenko Miura																		DNQ																0	–	–
	Kyle Keller																									DNQ									0	–	–
Ineligible for Xfinity Series driver points
Pos	Driver	DAY	ATL	LVS	PHO	COA	RCH	MAR	TEX	TAL	DOV	DAR	CLT	PIR	SON	IOW	NHA	NSH	CSC	POC	IND	MCH	DAY	DAR	ATL	GLN	BRI	KAN	TAL	ROV	LVS	HOM	MAR	PHO	Pts.	Stage	Bonus
	John Hunter Nemechek	7	32	1*	32	3						23			8	27		1*^{2}	25			3^{2}															
	Christopher Bell																1^{2}							1*^{1}													
	Kyle Larson					**1**													3																		
	Chase Elliott												1											4													
	Ty Gibbs					24							**9**		35^{2}			**20**^{1}	2							25											
	Corey Heim			13	22		4	35	17		35					3	10			16				25	5			31			11						
	Taylor Gray						3	13	11	15	34	18	12							5		8			28			38	32		33						
	William Byron				23							11								3						12^{2}											
	Noah Gragson												10					5				6		15													
	Ross Chastain															9		27						12		6											
	Connor Mosack																		6											18							
	Kyle Busch												6																								
	Daniel Dye	27							24		20					10				17	7	34						34			12			17			
	Joey Logano																		8					38		9											
	Jeffrey Earnhardt		8							37												21	28				35							35			
	Alex Bowman																9																				
	Mason Massey									11							30			29					Wth												
	William Sawalich																															24	33	**13**			
	Lawless Alan																					35			13												
	Tyler Reddick																	14																			
	Mason Maggio																								18							31	22				
	Brett Moffitt															18																					
	Dean Thompson												34																20								
	Nathan Byrd													21			36													25							
	Dawson Cram	31	31	34	28		25	24	37	28	29	28	22			22		37		38				DNQ	37		DNQ	35		24	36	33	25	32			
	Kaden Honeycutt										23																										
	Daniel Suárez	35																	27																		
	Josh Berry																			27	38																
	Frankie Muniz	33			30									DNQ																							
	Stefan Parsons																										33							38			
	Akinori Ogata							38					DNQ										38								35						
	Stephen Mallozzi																			35																	
	Ty Dillon					37													DNQ																		
	Kaz Grala					DNQ																															
	Daniel Hemric					QL^{†}																															
Pos	Driver	DAY	ATL	LVS	PHO	COA	RCH	MAR	TEX	TAL	DOV	DAR	CLT	PIR	SON	IOW	NHA	NSH	CSC	POC	IND	MCH	DAY	DAR	ATL	GLN	BRI	KAN	TAL	ROV	LVS	HOM	MAR	PHO	Pts.	Stage	Bonus
^{†} – Josh Williams and his wife were on baby watch on Friday, so his car was practiced and qualified by Daniel Hemric.^{‡} – Thomas Annunziata was relieved by Joey Gase after the former suffered from heat exhaustion during the race. Since Annunziata started the race, he is officially credited with 29th place.^{¶} – Caesar Bacarella was replaced by Tommy Joe Martins after qualifying.

=== Owners' championship (Top 15) ===
(key) Bold – Pole position awarded by time. Italics – Pole position set by competition-based formula. * – Most laps led. ^{1} – Stage 1 winner. ^{2} – Stage 2 winner ^{1–10} – Regular season top 10 finishers.
. – Eliminated after Round of 12 . – Eliminated after Round of 8

Pos.	No.	Car Owner	DAY	ATL	LVS	PHO	COA	RCH	MAR	TEX	TAL	DOV	DAR	CLT	PIR	SON	IOW	NHA	NSH	CSC	POC	IND	MCH	DAY	DAR	ATL	GLN	BRI	KAN	TAL	ROV	LVS	HOM	MAR	PHO	Points	Bonus
1	7	Kelley Earnhardt Miller	8	28	10	29	13	11	5^{2}	3*^{12}	38	17^{1}	1*^{12}	33^{12}	2*^{12}	6	30	4	8	9	2*^{1}	9	1*	7^{12}	10	30^{1}	17	30	36	26	7^{2}	3^{2}	8	5	2	4035	33^{3}
2	20	Joe Gibbs	7	32	1*	32	3	2*^{12}	1*^{1}	7	34	1	5	**9**	27	8	27	1^{2}	1*^{2}	25	19	3	3^{2}	1	**1***^{1}	10	26	5	1^{1}	20	9	13	3	1*^{12}	3	4034	39^{1}
3	16	Matt Kaulig	10	13	6	18	10*	14	36	4	19	6	35	5	4	17	37	11	7	11	6	8	10	24*	27	3*^{2}	3	10	17	11	2*^{1}	1*	10	38	9	4028	6^{7}
4	21	Richard Childress	1^{2}	1	4	4	2	8	34	6	**14***^{2}	15	2	25	11	5	29	24	4	7^{2}	7	6	18	31	9	1	33	14	7	24^{2}	4	10	1*^{12}	14	10	4027	25^{5}
NASCAR Xfinity Series Playoffs cut-off
5	81	Joe Gibbs	5	2	3^{12}	1*^{1}	8	1	3	15	25	7	12	18	35	7	8*^{12}	15	2	38	15	33	27	2	8	4	4	**3**^{1}	3*	5^{1}	5	4	**13**	3	5	2313	24^{4}
6	00	Gene Haas	13	16	**2**	**5**^{2}	4	10	7	5	10	5*^{2}	3	32	6	9	6	3*	9	18	1	**2***	30	32	2	31	21	1*	2	27	13	8^{1}	2	4	8	2292	23^{2}
7	18	Joe Gibbs	2	4	26	3	32	35	6	19	6	4	9	36	13	2	5	2	33	26	**4**	5	**2**	8	3^{2}	25	2	2	5	4	35	9	5	6	7	2263	6^{6}
8	98	Tony Stewart	6	15	5	24	34^{2}	13	25	27	2	16	7	38	10	13	2	8	6	28	11	1^{1}	38	4	35	26	13	13	10	3	32	7	6	11	1*^{12}	2153	9^{9}
9	2	Richard Childress	**20***^{1}	**12***^{12}	17	2	6	5	9	**9**	1^{1}	24	8	28	19	12	31	13	3	5*	22	13	29	21	6	**6**	8	4	9	**6***	19	6	4	12	6	2246	12^{8}
10	1	L. W. Miller	36	11	38	34	9	30	2	1	36	3	4	4*	**28**	3	1	19^{1}	10	19	10	37	37	13	28	36	20	9	13^{2}	16	1	14	9	30	11	2205	17
11	48	Scott Borchetta	25	19	11	8	5^{1}	7	12	25	29	12	6	37	8	10	11	7	16	4	8	12	11	3	13	2	7	16	12	12	6	5	11	8	14	2189	–3^{10}
12	97	Matt Kaulig	12	3	37	6	27*	14	11	18	22	18	15	15	1	**1***^{1}	34	18	15	**1***^{1}	31	4	17	25	7	27	5	18	8	36	**3**	38	17	28	12	2157	17
13	8	Dale Earnhardt Jr.	23	10	8	9	36	9	7	8	21	33	34	3	3	33	4	12	30	13	9	18	5	23	5	7	19	15	22	1	10	32	22	2	15	863	–
14	39	Rod Sieg	22	22	7	12	14	32	17	2	17	37	13	7	14	20	12	6	11	16	12	11^{2}	13^{1}	5	18	32	22	8	16	2	23	26	26	21	29	765	2
15	19	Joe Gibbs	21	9	12	31	24	3	13	11	15	34	18	12	12	35^{2}	18	22	**20**^{1}	2	5	17	8	12	11	28	25	19	38	33	8	33	24	33	**13**	761	–
Pos.	No.	Car Owner	DAY	ATL	LVS	PHO	COA	RCH	MAR	TEX	TAL	DOV	DAR	CLT	PIR	SON	IOW	NHA	NSH	CSC	POC	IND	MCH	DAY	DAR	ATL	GLN	BRI	KAN	TAL	ROV	LVS	HOM	MAR	PHO	Points	Bonus

=== Manufacturers' championship ===
Pos	Manufacturer	Wins	Points
1	Chevrolet	18	1228
2	Toyota	11	1172
3	Ford	4	1072

== See also ==
- 2024 NASCAR Cup Series
- 2024 NASCAR Craftsman Truck Series
- 2024 ARCA Menards Series
- 2024 ARCA Menards Series East
- 2024 ARCA Menards Series West
- 2024 NASCAR Whelen Modified Tour
- 2024 NASCAR Canada Series
- 2024 NASCAR Mexico Series
- 2024 NASCAR Whelen Euro Series
- 2024 NASCAR Brasil Sprint Race
- 2024 CARS Tour
- 2024 SMART Modified Tour
