= 2024 Cabo Wabo 250 =

21st race of the 2024 NASCAR Xfinity Series

Race details
- Race 21 of 33 of the 2024 NASCAR Xfinity Series
- Date: August 17, 2024
- Official name: 32nd Annual Cabo Wabo 250
- Location: Michigan International Speedway in Brooklyn, Michigan
- Course: Permanent racing facility
- Course length: 2.0 miles (3.2 km)
- Distance: 128 laps, 256 mi (412 km)
- Scheduled distance: 125 laps, 250 mi (400 km)
- Average speed: 108.743 mph (175.005 km/h)

Pole position
Driver	Sheldon Creed	Joe Gibbs Racing
- Time: 41.947

Most laps led
Driver	Justin Allgaier	JR Motorsports
- Laps: 37

Winner
No. 7	Justin Allgaier	JR Motorsports

Television in the United States
- Network: USA
- Announcers: Rick Allen, Steve Letarte and Jeff Burton

Radio in the United States
- Radio: MRN

The 2024 Cabo Wabo 250 was the 21st stock car race of the 2024 NASCAR Xfinity Series, and the 32nd iteration of the event. The race was held on Saturday, August 17, 2024, at Michigan International Speedway in Brooklyn, Michigan, a 2.0 miles (3.2 km) permanent quad-oval shaped racetrack. The race was originally scheduled to be contested over 125 laps, but was increased to 128 laps due to a NASCAR overtime finish. Justin Allgaier, driving for JR Motorsports, would survive a chaotic race on fuel mileage, and won after leading when the caution came out on the final lap. This was Allgaier's 25th career NASCAR Xfinity Series win, and his second of the season. To fill out the podium, Sheldon Creed and John Hunter Nemechek, both driving for Joe Gibbs Racing, would finish 2nd and 3rd, respectively.

The race was marred by an airborne crash from Kyle Sieg on the final lap. The incident began when Caesar Bacarella lost control following contact from Parker Kligerman from behind on the backstretch. Bacarella's sliding car turned Carson Kvapil across the track into the outside wall. In the scramble to avoid the crash, Leland Honeyman made contact with the rear of Sieg's car, sending it into a slide towards the apron and taking Chandler Smith with him. Sieg's roof flaps did not deploy, and the car lifted off the ground from behind and slid for several seconds on its roof, brushing the inside wall before rolling back onto its wheels when it reached the grass. Sieg was able to climb out under his own power, he was visibly shaken up from the wreck and had small pain in his right arm.

With his 11th runner-up finish, Sheldon Creed surpassed Dale Jarrett for the most runner-up finishes in the Xfinity Series without a win.

This was the final Xfinity Series race at Michigan International Speedway, as the track lost its race in 2025.

== Report ==
=== Background ===
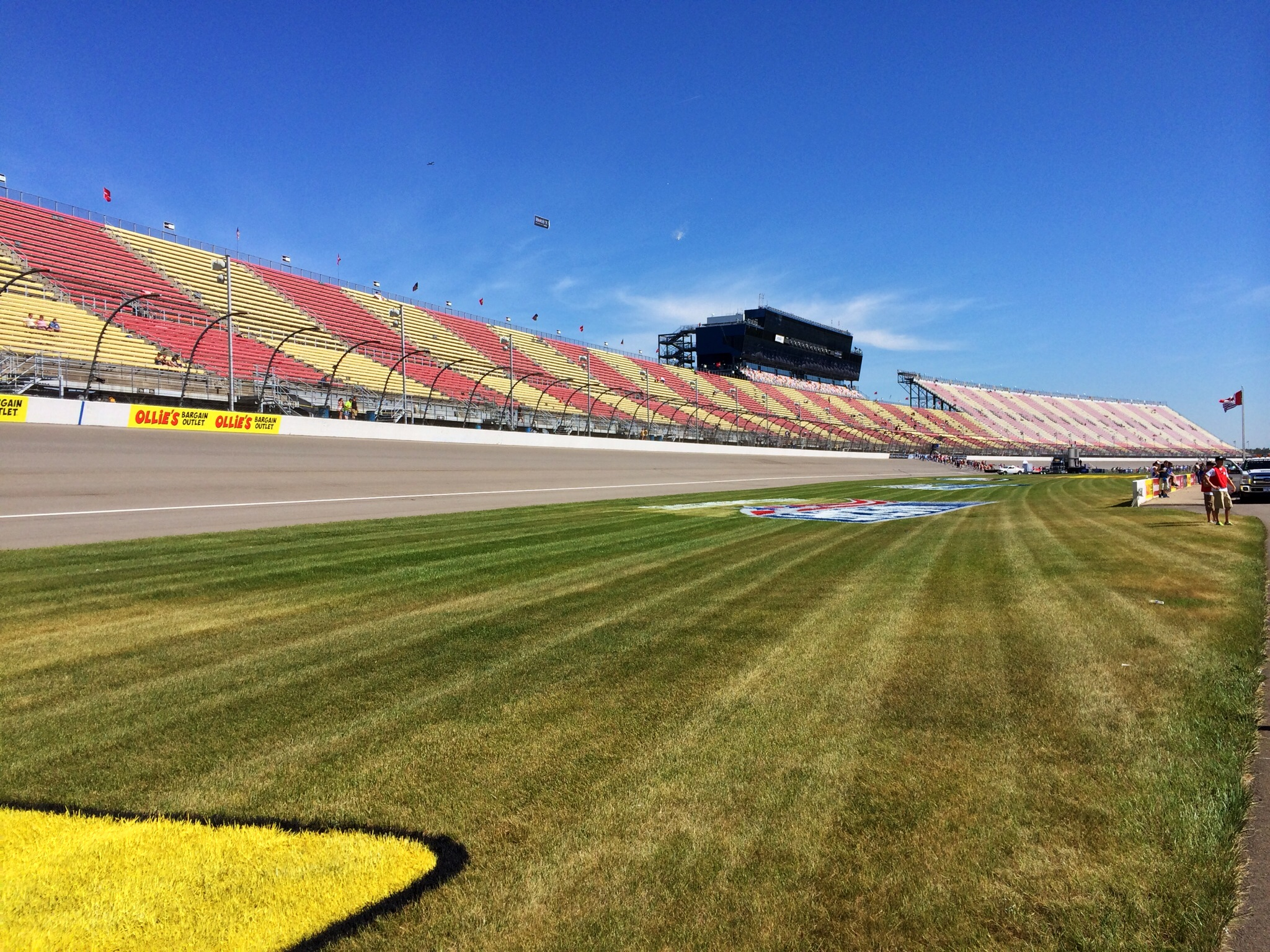
Michigan International Speedway, the circuit where the race was held.

Michigan International Speedway is a two-mile (3.2 km) moderate-banked D-shaped speedway located in Brooklyn, Michigan. The track is used primarily for NASCAR events. It is known as a "sister track" to Texas World Speedway as MIS's oval design was a direct basis of TWS, with moderate modifications to the banking in the corners, and was used as the basis of Auto Club Speedway. The track is owned by International Speedway Corporation. Michigan International Speedway is recognized as one of motorsports' premier facilities because of its wide racing surface and high banking (by open-wheel standards; the 18-degree banking is modest by stock car standards).

=== Entry list ===
- (R) denotes rookie driver.
- (i) denotes driver who is ineligible for series driver points.

#	Driver	Team	Make
00	Cole Custer	Stewart–Haas Racing	Ford
1	Sam Mayer	JR Motorsports	Chevrolet
2	Jesse Love (R)	Richard Childress Racing	Chevrolet
5	Anthony Alfredo	Our Motorsports	Chevrolet
07	Patrick Emerling	SS-Green Light Racing	Chevrolet
7	Justin Allgaier	JR Motorsports	Chevrolet
8	Sammy Smith	JR Motorsports	Chevrolet
9	Brandon Jones	JR Motorsports	Chevrolet
10	Daniel Dye (i)	Kaulig Racing	Chevrolet
11	Josh Williams	Kaulig Racing	Chevrolet
14	Logan Bearden	SS-Green Light Racing	Ford
15	Lawless Alan (i)	AM Racing	Ford
16	A. J. Allmendinger	Kaulig Racing	Chevrolet
18	Sheldon Creed	Joe Gibbs Racing	Toyota
19	Taylor Gray (i)	Joe Gibbs Racing	Toyota
20	John Hunter Nemechek (i)	Joe Gibbs Racing	Toyota
21	Austin Hill	Richard Childress Racing	Chevrolet
26	Jeffrey Earnhardt	Sam Hunt Racing	Toyota
27	Jeb Burton	Jordan Anderson Racing	Chevrolet
28	Kyle Sieg	RSS Racing	Ford
29	Blaine Perkins	RSS Racing	Ford
30	Noah Gragson (i)	Rette Jones Racing	Ford
31	Parker Retzlaff	Jordan Anderson Racing	Chevrolet
35	Joey Gase	Joey Gase Motorsports	Chevrolet
38	Matt DiBenedetto	RSS Racing	Ford
39	Ryan Sieg	RSS Racing	Ford
42	Leland Honeyman (R)	Young's Motorsports	Chevrolet
43	Ryan Ellis	Alpha Prime Racing	Chevrolet
44	Brennan Poole	Alpha Prime Racing	Chevrolet
45	Caesar Bacarella	Alpha Prime Racing	Chevrolet
48	Parker Kligerman	Big Machine Racing	Chevrolet
51	Jeremy Clements	Jeremy Clements Racing	Chevrolet
53	Morgen Baird	Joey Gase Motorsports	Ford
81	Chandler Smith	Joe Gibbs Racing	Toyota
88	Carson Kvapil	JR Motorsports	Chevrolet
91	Kyle Weatherman	DGM Racing	Chevrolet
92	Josh Bilicki	DGM Racing	Chevrolet
97	Shane van Gisbergen (R)	Kaulig Racing	Chevrolet
98	Riley Herbst	Stewart–Haas Racing	Ford
Official entry list

== Practice ==
For practice, drivers were split into two groups, Group A and B, with both sessions being 15 minutes long, and was held on Friday, August 16, at 3:35 PM EST. John Hunter Nemechek, driving for Joe Gibbs Racing, would set the fastest time between both sessions, with a lap of 41.489, and a speed of 173.540 mph (279.286 km/h).

Pos.	#	Driver	Team	Make	Time	Speed
1	20	John Hunter Nemechek (i)	Joe Gibbs Racing	Toyota	41.489	173.540
2	81	Chandler Smith	Joe Gibbs Racing	Toyota	41.494	173.519
3	18	Sheldon Creed	Joe Gibbs Racing	Toyota	41.612	173.027
Full practice results

== Qualifying ==
Qualifying was held on Friday, August 16, at 4:00 PM EST. Since Michigan International Speedway is a superspeedway, the qualifying system used is a single-car, one-lap system with only one round. Drivers will be on track by themselves and will have one lap to post a qualifying time, and whoever sets the fastest time in that session will win the pole.

Road course qualifying rules were in effect. The timing line was set in Turn 3, where cars exited pit road, drove five-eights of a lap, then took the green flag in the north chute exiting Turn 3, and completing their lap there the next time by. Teams then immediately pitted the car, meaning only two laps were run. Indianapolis and Michigan both used restrictor plates.

Sheldon Creed, driving for Joe Gibbs Racing, would score the pole for the race, with a lap of 41.947, and a speed of 171.645 mph (276.236 km/h).

Morgen Baird was the only driver who failed to qualify.

=== Qualifying results ===
Pos.	#	Driver	Team	Make	Time	Speed
1	18	Sheldon Creed	Joe Gibbs Racing	Toyota	41.947	171.645
2	98	Riley Herbst	Stewart–Haas Racing	Ford	42.048	171.233
3	19	Taylor Gray (i)	Joe Gibbs Racing	Toyota	42.067	171.156
4	00	Cole Custer	Stewart–Haas Racing	Ford	42.076	171.119
5	81	Chandler Smith	Joe Gibbs Racing	Toyota	42.230	170.495
6	9	Brandon Jones	JR Motorsports	Chevrolet	42.251	170.410
7	39	Ryan Sieg	RSS Racing	Ford	42.324	170.116
8	88	Carson Kvapil	JR Motorsports	Chevrolet	42.336	170.068
9	2	Jesse Love (R)	Richard Childress Racing	Chevrolet	42.355	169.992
10	20	John Hunter Nemechek (i)	Joe Gibbs Racing	Toyota	42.359	169.976
11	1	Sam Mayer	JR Motorsports	Chevrolet	42.406	169.787
12	30	Noah Gragson (i)	Rette Jones Racing	Ford	42.451	169.607
13	16	A. J. Allmendinger	Kaulig Racing	Chevrolet	42.501	169.408
14	8	Sammy Smith	JR Motorsports	Chevrolet	42.530	169.292
15	15	Lawless Alan (i)	AM Racing	Ford	42.532	169.284
16	7	Justin Allgaier	JR Motorsports	Chevrolet	42.537	169.264
17	26	Jeffrey Earnhardt	Sam Hunt Racing	Toyota	42.545	169.233
18	27	Jeb Burton	Jordan Anderson Racing	Chevrolet	42.564	169.157
19	5	Anthony Alfredo	Our Motorsports	Chevrolet	42.580	169.093
20	21	Austin Hill	Richard Childress Racing	Chevrolet	42.586	169.070
21	51	Jeremy Clements	Jeremy Clements Racing	Chevrolet	42.665	168.757
22	48	Parker Kligerman	Big Machine Racing	Chevrolet	42.668	168.745
23	97	Shane van Gisbergen (R)	Kaulig Racing	Chevrolet	42.672	168.729
24	10	Daniel Dye (i)	Kaulig Racing	Chevrolet	42.706	168.595
25	45	Caesar Bacarella	Alpha Prime Racing	Chevrolet	42.818	168.154
26	31	Parker Retzlaff	Jordan Anderson Racing	Chevrolet	42.866	167.965
27	28	Kyle Sieg	RSS Racing	Ford	42.938	167.684
28	91	Kyle Weatherman	DGM Racing	Chevrolet	42.939	167.680
29	11	Josh Williams	Kaulig Racing	Chevrolet	42.993	167.469
30	29	Blaine Perkins	RSS Racing	Ford	42.997	167.454
31	38	Matt DiBenedetto	RSS Racing	Ford	43.112	167.007
32	07	Patrick Emerling	SS-Green Light Racing	Chevrolet	43.156	166.837
33	42	Leland Honeyman (R)	Young's Motorsports	Chevrolet	43.164	166.806
Qualified by owner's points
34	92	Josh Bilicki	DGM Racing	Chevrolet	43.217	166.601
35	14	Logan Bearden	SS-Green Light Racing	Ford	43.250	166.474
36	44	Brennan Poole	Alpha Prime Racing	Chevrolet	43.274	166.382
37	43	Ryan Ellis	Alpha Prime Racing	Chevrolet	43.335	166.147
38	35	Joey Gase	Joey Gase Motorsports	Chevrolet	43.349	166.094
Failed to qualify
39	53	Morgen Baird	Joey Gase Motorsports	Ford	43.288	166.328
Official qualifying results
Official starting lineup

== Race results ==
Stage 1 Laps: 30

Pos.	#	Driver	Team	Make	Pts
1	39	Ryan Sieg	RSS Racing	Ford	10
2	9	Brandon Jones	JR Motorsports	Chevrolet	9
3	81	Chandler Smith	Joe Gibbs Racing	Toyota	8
4	7	Justin Allgaier	JR Motorsports	Chevrolet	7
5	15	Lawless Alan (i)	AM Racing	Ford	0
6	21	Austin Hill	Richard Childress Racing	Chevrolet	5
7	98	Riley Herbst	Stewart-Haas Racing	Ford	4
8	28	Kyle Sieg	RSS Racing	Ford	3
9	16	A. J. Allmendinger	Kaulig Racing	Chevrolet	2
10	48	Parker Kligerman	Big Machine Racing	Chevrolet	1

Stage 2 Laps: 30

Pos.	#	Driver	Team	Make	Pts
1	20	John Hunter Nemechek (i)	Joe Gibbs Racing	Toyota	0
2	2	Jesse Love (R)	Richard Childress Racing	Chevrolet	9
3	16	A. J. Allmendinger	Kaulig Racing	Chevrolet	8
4	19	Taylor Gray (i)	Joe Gibbs Racing	Toyota	0
5	8	Sammy Smith	JR Motorsports	Chevrolet	6
6	81	Chandler Smith	Joe Gibbs Racing	Toyota	5
7	7	Justin Allgaier	JR Motorsports	Chevrolet	4
8	18	Sheldon Creed	Joe Gibbs Racing	Toyota	3
9	27	Jeb Burton	Jordan Anderson Racing	Chevrolet	2
10	5	Anthony Alfredo	Our Motorsports	Chevrolet	1

Stage 3 Laps: 68

Fin	St	#	Driver	Team	Make	Laps	Led	Status	Pts
1	16	7	Justin Allgaier	JR Motorsports	Chevrolet	128	37	Running	51
2	1	18	Sheldon Creed	Joe Gibbs Racing	Toyota	128	23	Running	38
3	10	20	John Hunter Nemechek (i)	Joe Gibbs Racing	Toyota	128	31	Running	0
4	19	5	Anthony Alfredo	Our Motorsports	Chevrolet	128	0	Running	34
5	14	8	Sammy Smith	JR Motorsports	Chevrolet	128	0	Running	38
6	12	30	Noah Gragson (i)	Rette Jones Racing	Ford	128	0	Running	0
7	31	38	Matt DiBenedetto	RSS Racing	Ford	128	0	Running	30
8	3	19	Taylor Gray (i)	Joe Gibbs Racing	Toyota	128	0	Running	0
9	25	45	Caesar Bacarella	Alpha Prime Racing	Chevrolet	128	0	Running	28
10	13	16	A. J. Allmendinger	Kaulig Racing	Chevrolet	128	0	Running	37
11	22	48	Parker Kligerman	Big Machine Racing	Chevrolet	128	0	Running	27
12	33	42	Leland Honeyman (R)	Young's Motorsports	Chevrolet	128	0	Running	25
13	7	39	Ryan Sieg	RSS Racing	Ford	128	7	Running	34
14	37	43	Ryan Ellis	Alpha Prime Racing	Chevrolet	128	0	Running	23
15	21	51	Jeremy Clements	Jeremy Clements Racing	Chevrolet	128	0	Running	22
16	18	27	Jeb Burton	Jordan Anderson Racing	Chevrolet	128	0	Running	23
17	23	97	Shane van Gisbergen (R)	Kaulig Racing	Chevrolet	128	0	Running	20
18	20	21	Austin Hill	Richard Childress Racing	Chevrolet	128	0	Running	24
19	29	11	Josh Williams	Kaulig Racing	Chevrolet	128	0	Running	18
20	26	31	Parker Retzlaff	Jordan Anderson Racing	Chevrolet	128	0	Running	17
21	17	26	Jeffrey Earnhardt	Sam Hunt Racing	Toyota	128	0	Running	0
22	32	07	Patrick Emerling	SS-Green Light Racing	Chevrolet	128	0	Running	15
23	30	29	Blaine Perkins	RSS Racing	Ford	128	0	Running	14
24	34	92	Josh Bilicki	DGM Racing	Chevrolet	128	0	Running	13
25	35	14	Logan Bearden	SS-Green Light Racing	Ford	128	0	Running	12
26	8	88	Carson Kvapil	JR Motorsports	Chevrolet	128	25	Running	11
27	5	81	Chandler Smith	Joe Gibbs Racing	Toyota	128	0	Running	23
28	27	28	Kyle Sieg	RSS Racing	Ford	127	0	Accident	12
29	9	2	Jesse Love (R)	Richard Childress Racing	Chevrolet	127	1	Running	17
30	4	00	Cole Custer	Stewart–Haas Racing	Ford	111	0	Suspension	7
31	38	35	Joey Gase	Joey Gase Motorsports	Chevrolet	101	0	Fuel Pump	6
32	28	91	Kyle Weatherman	DGM Racing	Chevrolet	94	0	Accident	6
33	36	44	Brennan Poole	Alpha Prime Racing	Chevrolet	71	0	Oil Pump	5
34	24	10	Daniel Dye (i)	Kaulig Racing	Chevrolet	66	0	Accident	0
35	15	15	Lawless Alan (i)	AM Racing	Ford	65	0	Accident	0
36	6	9	Brandon Jones	JR Motorsports	Chevrolet	50	0	Accident	10
37	11	1	Sam Mayer	JR Motorsports	Chevrolet	49	0	Accident	1
38	2	98	Riley Herbst	Stewart–Haas Racing	Ford	48	0	Accident	5
Official race results

== Standings after the race ==
Drivers' Championship standings

	Pos	Driver	Points
	1	Cole Custer	768
	2	Justin Allgaier	756 (-12)
	3	Austin Hill	698 (–70)
	4	Chandler Smith	684 (–84)
1	5	A. J. Allmendinger	646 (–122)
1	6	Riley Herbst	623 (–145)
1	7	Sheldon Creed	614 (–154)
1	8	Jesse Love	604 (–164)
	9	Parker Kligerman	580 (–188)
1	10	Sammy Smith	545 (–223)
1	11	Ryan Sieg	544 (–224)
1	12	Shane van Gisbergen	520 (–248)
Official driver's standings

Manufacturers' Championship standings

Pos	Manufacturer	Points
1	Chevrolet	785
2	Toyota	743 (-42)
3	Ford	644 (–110)

- Note: Only the first 12 positions are included for the driver standings.

Previous race: 2024 Pennzoil 250	NASCAR Xfinity Series; 2024 season	Next race: 2024 Wawa 250
