= Brad Perez =

American racing driver (born 1997)

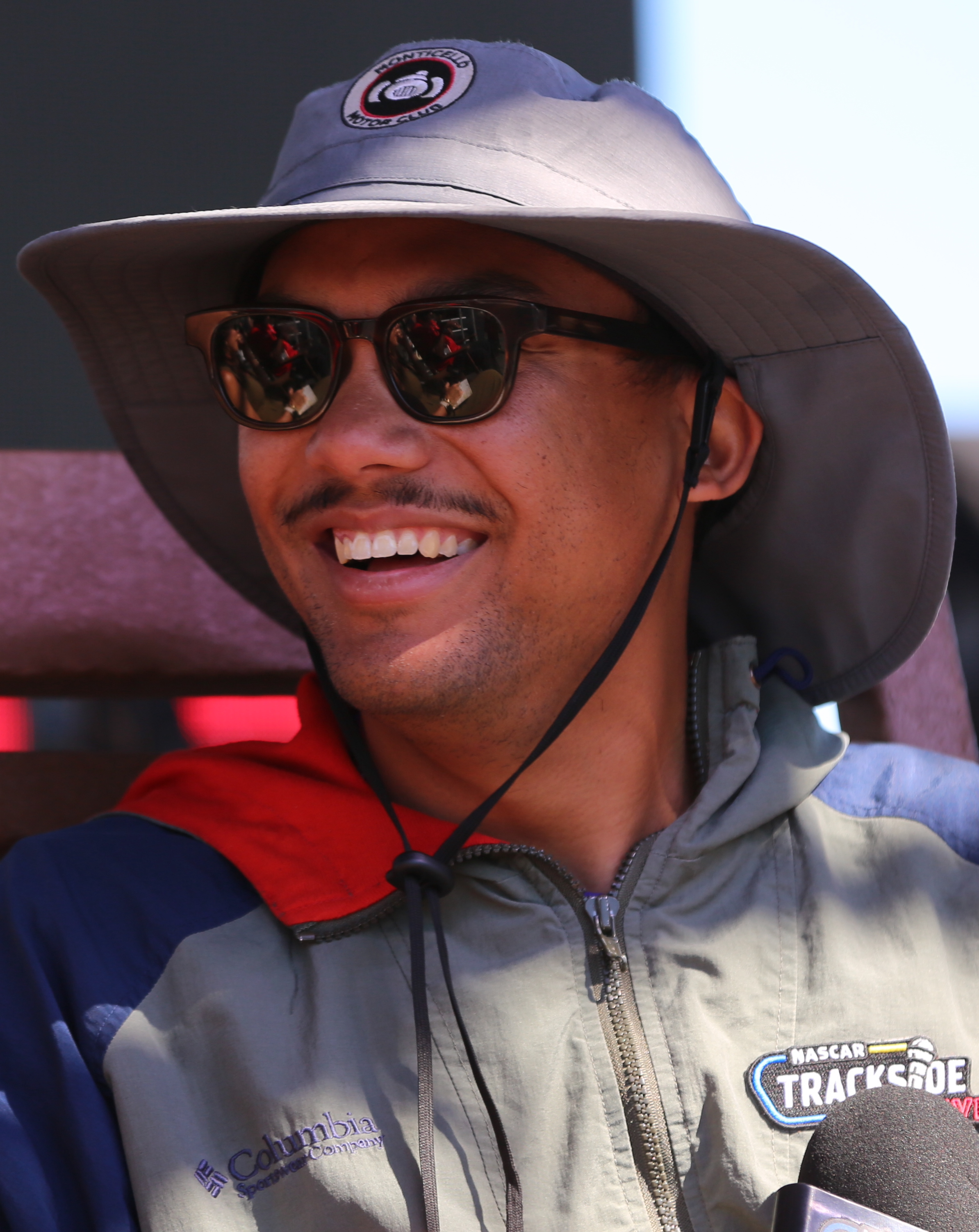
- Perez at Sonoma Raceway in 2026
- Born: Bradley Adam Perez; January 21, 1997 (age 29); Hollywood, Florida, U.S.

NASCAR O'Reilly Auto Parts Series career
- 27 races run over 5 years
- 2026 position: 44th
- Best finish: 44th (2025, 2026)
- First race: 2022 Sunoco Go Rewards 200 at The Glen (Watkins Glen)
- Last race: 2026 O'Reilly Auto Parts 300 (Homestead)
Wins	Top tens	Poles
0	0	0

NASCAR FedEx Freight Truck Series career
- 5 races run over 2 years
- 2023 position: 108th
- Best finish: 48th (2022)
- First race: 2022 XPEL 225 (COTA)
- Last race: 2023 Baptist Health Cancer Care 200 (Homestead)
Wins	Top tens	Poles
0	0	0

ARCA Menards Series career
- 6 races run over 4 years
- Best finish: 75th (2024)
- First race: 2021 Clean Harbors 100 at The Glen (Watkins Glen)
- Last race: 2026 Bush's Best 200 (Bristol)
Wins	Top tens	Poles
0	1	0

ARCA Menards Series East career
- 1 race run over 1 year
- Best finish: 71st (2026)
- First race: 2026 Bush's Best 200 (Bristol)
Wins	Top tens	Poles
0	0	0

ARCA Menards Series West career
- 3 races run over 3 years
- Best finish: 80th (2024, 2025)
- First race: 2024 General Tire 150 (Phoenix)
- Last race: 2026 General Tire 150 (Phoenix)
Wins	Top tens	Poles
0	0	0
- Statistics up to date as of November 7, 2026.

Bradley Adam "Bread" Perez (born January 21, 1997) is an American professional stock car racing driver and pit crew member. He last competed part-time in the NASCAR O'Reilly Auto Parts Series, driving the No. 42 Chevrolet Camaro SS for Young's Motorsports, the No. 55 Toyota GR Supra for Joey Gase Motorsports with Scott Osteen, and the No. 38 Ford Mustang Dark Horse for RSS Racing, and part-time in the ARCA Menards Series, driving the No. 10 Ford for Fast Track Racing, and the No. 19 Chevrolet for Maples Motorsports. He previously worked as a tire specialist in the Truck Series for Rackley W.A.R. from 2021 to 2022.

== Racing career ==
=== Early career ===
==== Go-karts ====
Perez began racing in 2015, at the age of 18, when he raced go-karts at the AMR Motorplex, outside of the Homestead–Miami Speedway, driving for RYSA Racing.

==== SCCA ====
In 2017 Perez began racing in the SCCA, driving in the Spec Miata category, for his own team, Brad Perez Racing.

In 2019, Perez went full-time racing in Spec Miata's, driving in the Hoosier Super Tour in SCCA.

From 2019 to 2021, Perez worked as a tire specialist for NASCAR teams, JD Motorsports in 2019, Martins Motorsports in 2020, and Rackley W.A.R. in 2021.

In 2020, Perez would return to the Hoosier Super Tour and would race in the ChampCar 14 Hours of Daytona later that year.

==== Legend cars ====
In 2018, Perez went over to Legends cars, where he drove at the Citrus County Speedway and the Auburndale Speedway for a few races, driving for Little Gator Motorsports.

From 2020 to 2022, Perez would return for select races for Josh Williams Motorsports.

=== Crew chief ===
On April 19, 2022, it was announced that Perez would work as a crew chief for Willie Mullins in the 2022 General Tire 200 at Talladega. It was revealed on the entry list for the race.

=== ARCA Menards Series ===
==== 2021 ====
On July 30, 2021, NASCAR Xfinity Series driver Josh Williams, announced that Perez would drive for his team in the 2021 Clean Harbors 100 at the Glen, making it Perez's first ever ARCA Menards Series start. Perez would start the race and finish in 24th position despite running towards the top-ten until late in the race.

==== 2022 ====
Perez would do pre-season testing at Daytona to kick off 2022 with Willie Mullins with plans to compete if he can find sponsorship for the season.

=== Craftsman Truck Series ===
==== 2022 ====
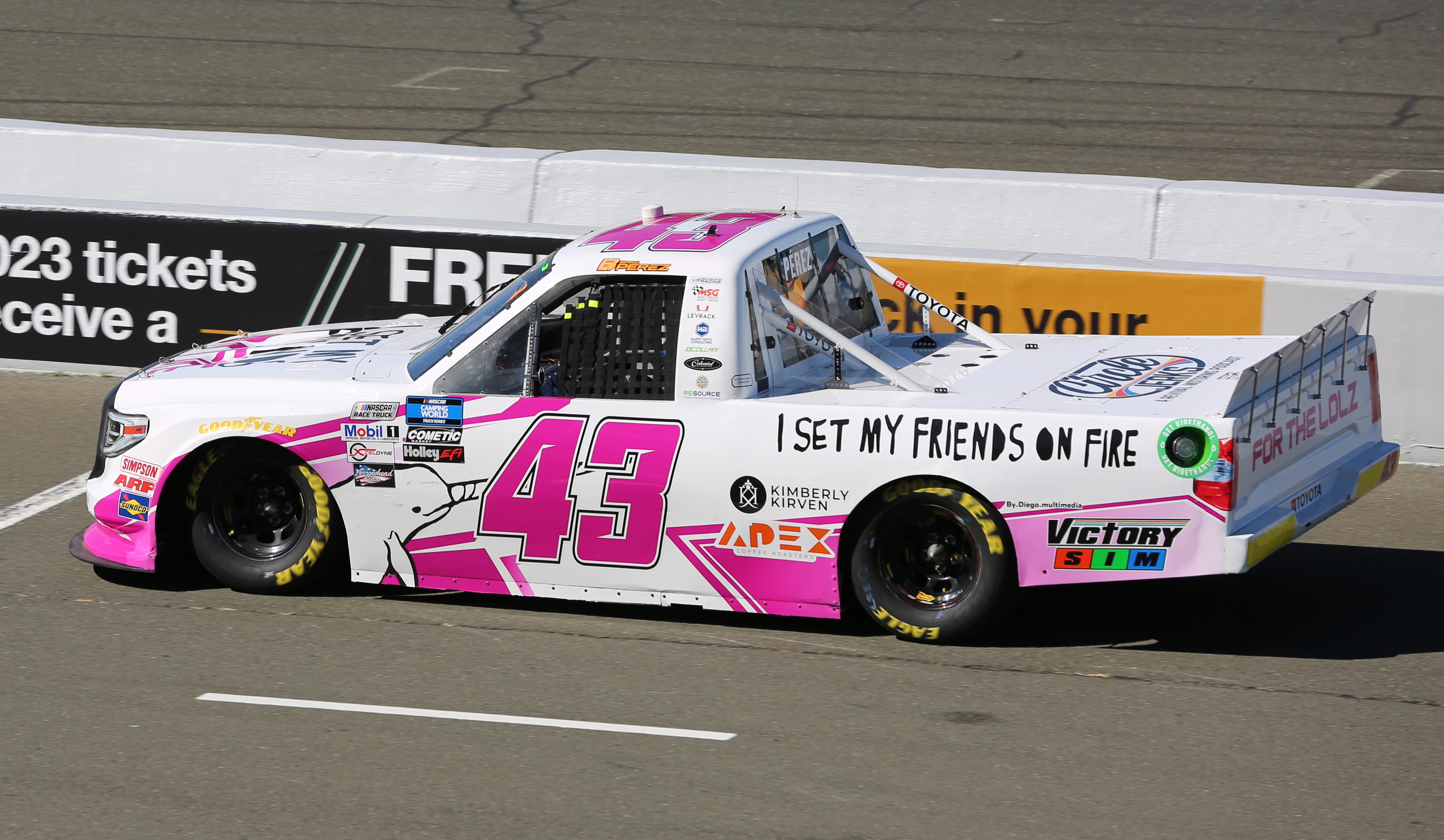
Perez's No. 43 truck at Sonoma Raceway in 2022

On March 21, 2022, Perez announced that he would make his NASCAR Camping World Truck Series debut at the Circuit of the Americas for Reaume Brothers Racing where he would start 32nd and finish twentieth. On June 6, 2022, Perez announced he would make another appearance with Reaume Brothers Racing at Sonoma Raceway with sponsorship from the band I Set My Friends on Fire.

==== 2023 ====
On April 10, 2023, Perez announced that he would return to the Truck Series and drive for Young's Motorsports at Martinsville Speedway, making his first NASCAR start on an oval track.

=== Xfinity Series ===
==== 2022 ====
On July 25, 2022, Perez announced that he would attempt to make his NASCAR Xfinity Series debut for MBM Motorsports in the 2022 Pennzoil 150 at Indianapolis, driving the No. 13 car, however, he failed to qualify. On August 16, Perez would announce that he would once again attempt to make his Xfinity Series start at Watkins Glen, this time driving the 35 car for Emerling-Gase Motorsports. He was able to make the race after qualifying 27th. He would finish the race in twentieth, earning his first career top-twenty in his first start.

==== 2023 ====
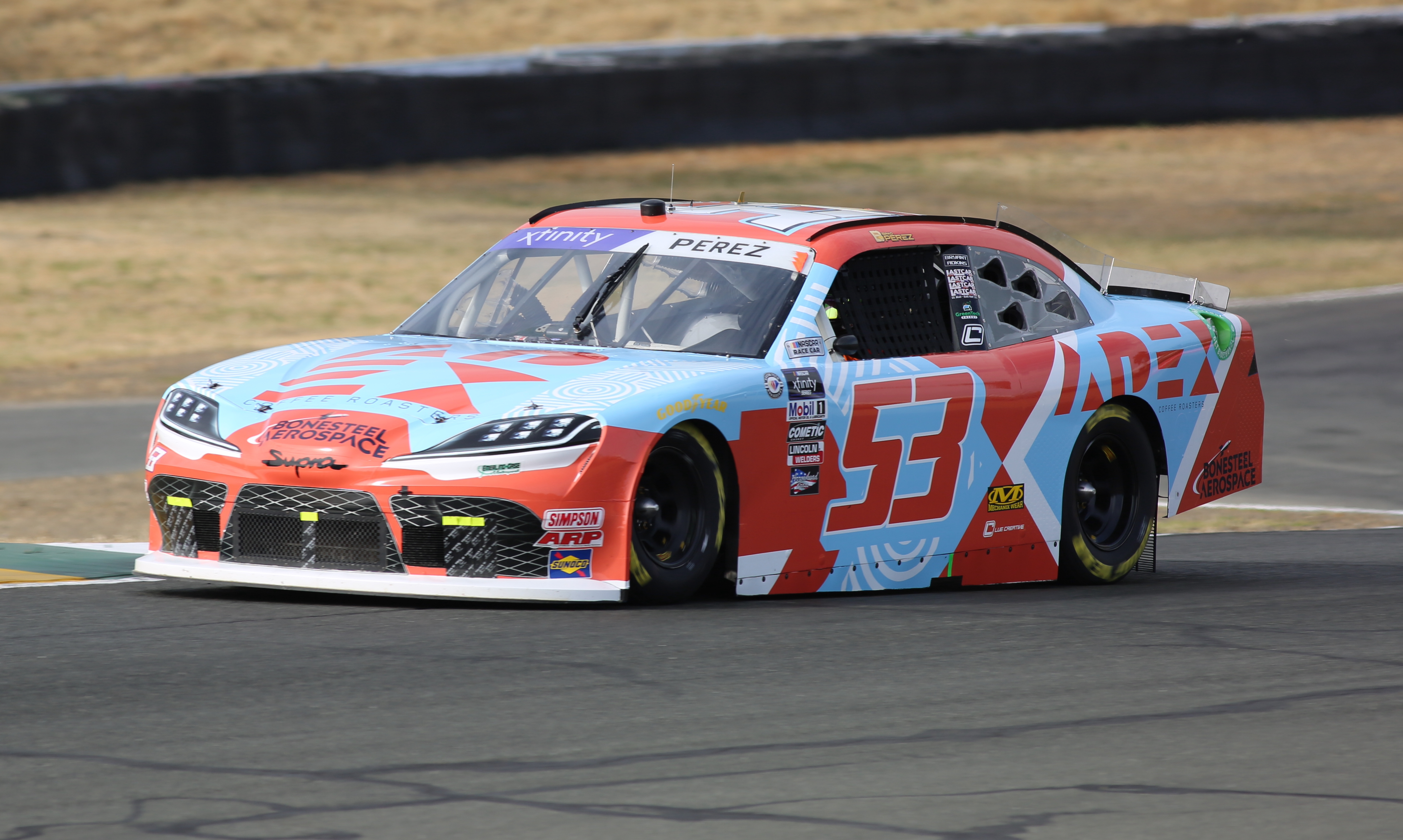
Perez's No. 53 car at Sonoma Raceway in 2023

On January 23, 2023, Perez announced in a video skit that he would return to Emerling-Gase Motorsports for the 2023 season, running four races, and may run more if sponsorship can be found. Perez would finish 29th after starting 30th.

While serving as a pit crew member for Emerling-Gase Motorsports during the 2023 Pacific Office Automation 147, Alpha Prime Racing would call on Perez to drive the No. 43 for them in place of their driver Leland Honeyman who had already started the race after he started suffering from food poisoning mid-race, Perez would finish 28th after getting sent into the tire barrier by a punt from Josh Williams in the final turn of the final lap while running fifteenth. On July 24, it was announced that Perez would join APR for the race at Road America, driving the No. 44 car. He would end up finishing inside the top-twenty in nineteenth. In the season finale at Phoenix, he drove the No. 74 for CHK Racing but failed to qualify.

==== 2024 ====
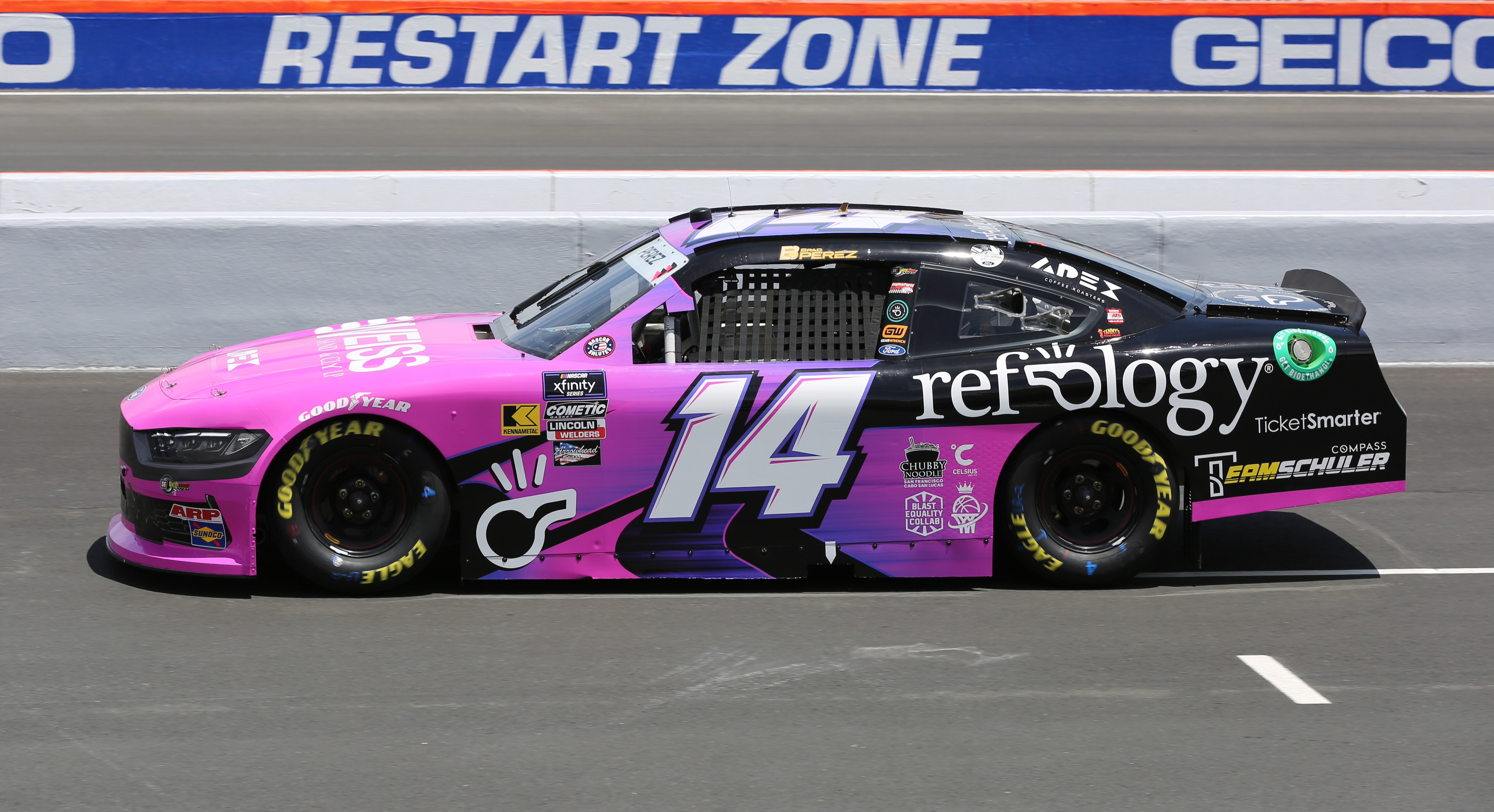
Perez's No. 14 car at Sonoma Raceway in 2024

On January 8, 2024, Perez announced on SiriusXM NASCAR Radio that he will return to Alpha Prime Racing for the 2024 season, driving the No. 45 car at Circuit of the Americas. Additionally, he would serve as a developmental and reserve driver for the team. On May 22, it was announced that Pérez would drive the No. 14 car for SS-Green Light Racing at Sonoma Raceway.

== Personal life ==
Perez graduated from the Monsignor Edward Pace High School in 2015, in Miami Gardens, Florida. He attended Broward College graduating from the class of 2017.

Perez is a disc jockey in his free time. He also occasionally is the merchandise manager at concerts for metalcore band, I Set My Friends on Fire. He is an avid fan of the Miami Dolphins in the NFL.

== Motorsports career results ==
=== NASCAR ===
(key) (Bold – Pole position awarded by qualifying time. Italics – Pole position earned by points standings or practice time. * – Most laps led. ** – All laps led.)

==== O'Reilly Auto Parts Series ====
NASCAR O'Reilly Auto Parts Series results
Year	Team	No.	Make	1	2	3	4	5	6	7	8	9	10	11	12	13	14	15	16	17	18	19	20	21	22	23	24	25	26	27	28	29	30	31	32	33	NOAPSC	Pts	Ref
2022	MBM Motorsports	13	Toyota	DAY	CAL	LVS	PHO	ATL	COA	RCH	MAR	TAL	DOV	DAR	TEX	CLT	PIR	NSH	ROA	ATL	NHA	POC	IRC; DNQ	MCH													98th	0^{1}	
2022	Emerling-Gase Motorsports	35	Toyota																						GLN; 20	DAY	DAR	KAN	BRI	TEX	TAL	ROV; 23	LVS	HOM	MAR	PHO	98th	0^{1}	
2023	Emerling-Gase Motorsports	53	Chevy	DAY	CAL	LVS	PHO	ATL	COA; 29	RCH	MAR	TAL	DOV	DAR	CLT				CSC; 32	ATL	NHA	POC			IRC; 38	GLN	DAY	DAR	KAN	BRI	TEX	ROV	LVS	HOM	MAR		50th	40	
2023	Alpha Prime Racing	43	Chevy													PIR; RL^{†}																					50th	40	
2023	Emerling-Gase Motorsports	53	Toyota														SON; 29	NSH																			50th	40	
2023	Alpha Prime Racing	44	Chevy																				ROA; 19	MCH													50th	40	
2023	CHK Racing	74	Chevy																																	PHO; DNQ	50th	40	
2024	Alpha Prime Racing	45	Chevy	DAY	ATL	LVS	PHO	COA; 18	RCH	MAR	TEX	TAL	DOV	DAR	CLT	PIR														KAN; 37	TAL	ROV; 26	LVS				49th	53	
2024	SS-Green Light Racing	14	Ford														SON; 24	IOW	NHA	NSH																	49th	53	
2024	Joey Gase Motorsports	35	Ford																		CSC; DNQ	POC	IND	MCH	DAY	DAR	ATL	GLN	BRI								49th	53	
2024	SS-Green Light Racing	07	Chevy																															HOM; 28	MAR	PHO	49th	53	
2025	Alpha Prime Racing	45	Chevy	DAY	ATL	COA; DNQ	PHO	LVS	HOM; 28	MAR; 23	DAR	BRI	CAR	TAL	TEX	CLT; 35	NSH	MXC; 26	POC	ATL	CSC; 30	SON; 31	DOV	IND	IOW	GLN	DAY	PIR	GTW	BRI	KAN	ROV	LVS	TAL			44th	56	
2025	SS-Green Light Racing	07	Chevy																																MAR; 31	PHO	44th	56	
2026	Young's Motorsports	42	Chevy	DAY	ATL	COA; RL^{‡}	PHO	LVS	DAR	MAR; 21	CAR	BRI; RL^{¶}	KAN	TAL	TEX; 36	GLN	DOV	CLT	NSH	POC									GTW; 28	BRI	LVS	CLT	PHO; 27	TAL	MAR	HOM; 32	44th	61	
2026	Joey Gase Motorsports with Scott Osteen	55	Toyota																		COR; 19	SON; 38	CHI	ATL	IND	IOW	DAY										44th	61	
2026	RSS Racing	38	Ford																									DAR; 38									44th	61	
^{†} – Relieved Leland Honeyman ^{‡} – Relieved J. J. Yeley ^{¶} – Relieved Logan Bearden

==== Craftsman Truck Series ====
NASCAR Camping World Truck Series results
Year	Team	No.	Make	1	2	3	4	5	6	7	8	9	10	11	12	13	14	15	16	17	18	19	20	21	22	23	NCWTC	Pts	Ref
2022	Reaume Brothers Racing	43	Toyota	DAY	LVS	ATL	COA; 20	MAR	BRD	DAR	KAN	TEX	CLT	GTW	SON; 22	KNX	NSH	MOH	POC	IRP	RCH	KAN	BRI	TAL	HOM	PHO	48th	32	
2023	Young's Motorsports	20	Chevy	DAY	LVS	ATL	COA	TEX	BRD	MAR; 35	KAN	DAR	NWS	CLT	GTW	NSH	MOH	POC	RCH	IRP							108th	0^{1}	
2023	On Point Motorsports	30	Toyota																		MLW; 35	KAN	BRI	TAL			108th	0^{1}	
2023	Young's Motorsports	02	Chevy																						HOM; 24	PHO	108th	0^{1}	

^{*} Season still in progress
^{1} Ineligible for series points

=== ARCA Menards Series ===
(key) (Bold – Pole position awarded by qualifying time. Italics – Pole position earned by points standings or practice time. * – Most laps led.)

ARCA Menards Series results
Year	Team	No.	Make	1	2	3	4	5	6	7	8	9	10	11	12	13	14	15	16	17	18	19	20	AMSC	Pts	Ref
2021	Josh Williams Motorsports	60	Chevy	DAY	PHO	TAL	KAN	TOL	CLT	MOH	POC	ELK	BLN	IOW	WIN	GLN; 24	MCH	ISF	MLW	DSF	BRI	SLM	KAN	113th	20	
2024	Fast Track Racing	11	Ford	DAY	PHO; 38	TAL	DOV	KAN	CLT	IOW														75th	41	
2024	Fast Track Racing	10	Toyota								MOH; 9	BLN	IRP	SLM	ELK	MCH	ISF	MLW	DSF	GLN	BRI	KAN	TOL	75th	41	
2025	Fast Track Racing	10	Ford	DAY	PHO; 30	TAL	KAN	CLT	MCH	BLN	ELK	LRP	DOV	IRP	IOW	GLN	ISF	MAD	DSF	BRI	SLM	KAN	TOL	137th	14	
2026	Fast Track Racing	10	Ford	DAY	PHO; 34	KAN	TAL	GLN	TOL	MCH	POC	BER	ELK	CHI	LRP	IRP	IOW	ISF	MAD	DSF	SLM			122nd	20	
2026	Maples Motorsports	19	Chevy																			BRI; 34	KAN	122nd	20	

==== ARCA Menards Series East ====
ARCA Menards Series East results
Year	Team	No.	Make	1	2	3	4	5	6	7	8	AMSEC	Pts	Ref
2026	Maples Motorsports	19	Chevy	HCY	CAR	NSV	TOL	IRP	FRS	IOW	BRI; 34	71st	10	

==== ARCA Menards Series West ====
ARCA Menards Series West results
Year	Team	No.	Make	1	2	3	4	5	6	7	8	9	10	11	12	13	AMSWC	Pts	Ref
2024	Fast Track Racing	11	Ford	PHO; 38	KER	PIR	SON	IRW	IRW	SHA	TRI	MAD	AAS	KER	PHO		80th	6	
2025	Fast Track Racing	10	Ford	KER	PHO; 30	TUC	CNS	KER	SON	TRI	PIR	AAS	MAD	LVS	PHO		80th	14	
2026	Fast Track Racing	10	Ford	KER	PHO; 34	TUC	SHA	CNS	TRI	SON	PIR	AAS	MAD	LVS	PHO	KER	85th	10	
