= Blaine Perkins =

American racing driver (born 2000)

- Perkins at Las Vegas Motor Speedway in 2026
- Born: Blaine Michael Perkins; February 28, 2000 (age 26); Bakersfield, California, U.S.

NASCAR O'Reilly Auto Parts Series career
- 141 races run over 6 years
- Car no., team: No. 24 (Sam Hunt Racing)
- 2026 position: 22nd
- Best finish: 22nd (2026)
- First race: 2021 Call 811 Before You Dig 200 (Phoenix)
- Last race: 2026 O'Reilly Auto Parts 300 (Homestead)
Wins	Top tens	Poles
0	7	0

NASCAR FedEx Freight Truck Series career
- 22 races run over 1 year
- 2022 position: 29th
- Best finish: 29th (2022)
- First race: 2022 NextEra Energy 250 (Daytona)
- Last race: 2022 Lucas Oil 150 (Phoenix)
Wins	Top tens	Poles
0	0	0

ARCA Menards Series career
- 6 races run over 3 years
- Best finish: 28th (2018)
- First race: 2017 Crosley Brands 150 (Kentucky)
- Last race: 2022 Dawn 150 (Mid-Ohio)
Wins	Top tens	Poles
0	2	0

ARCA Menards Series West career
- 40 races run over 4 years
- Best finish: 2nd (2020)
- First race: 2015 Toyota/NAPA Auto Parts 150 (Roseville)
- Last race: 2020 Arizona Lottery 100 (Phoenix)
- First win: 2020 ENEOS/Sunrise Ford Twin 30 Race #2 (Tooele)
- Last win: 2020 ENEOS/NAPA Auto Parts 150 (Douglas County)
Wins	Top tens	Poles
3	24	2
- Statistics up to date as of November 7, 2026.

Blaine Michael Perkins (born February 28, 2000) is an American professional stock car racing driver. He competes full-time in the NASCAR O'Reilly Auto Parts Series, driving the No. 24 Toyota GR Supra for Sam Hunt Racing. He has previously competed in the NASCAR Craftsman Truck Series, ARCA Menards Series, and the ARCA Menards Series West.

== Racing career ==
Perkins started his racing career in Bandolero racing.

=== ARCA Menards Series ===
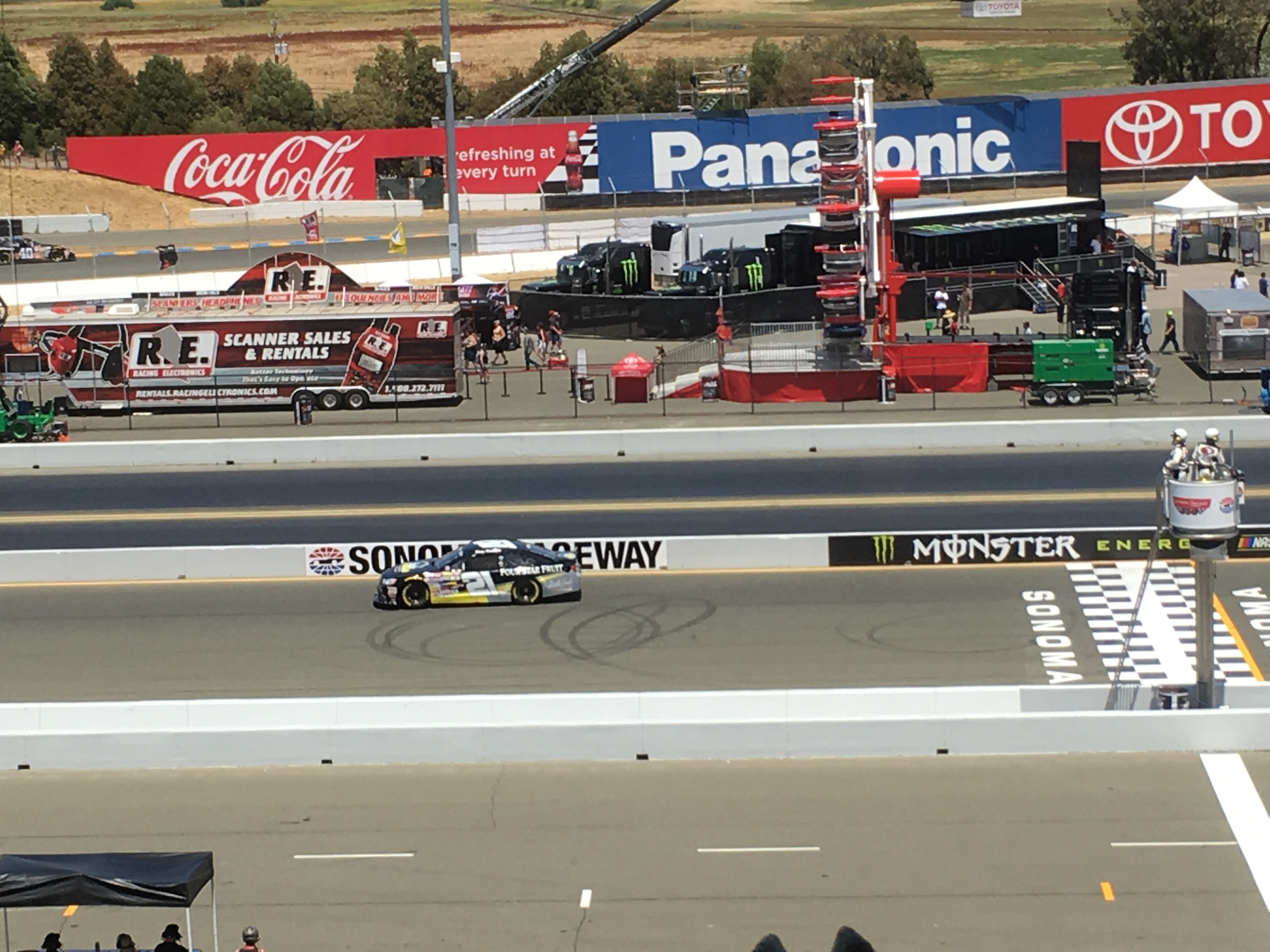
Perkins (No. 21) competing in the 2017 Carneros 200 at Sonoma Raceway.

Perkins made his debut in the West Series in 2015 at All American Speedway in Roseville, California, driving the No. 54 Toyota for Bill McAnally Racing, where he started seventeenth and finished thirteenth. After that, he secured a full-time ride in the series the following season with Steve Portenga Racing in their No. 21 car.

Perkins moved to the ARCA Racing Series for 2018 and drove in five races for Mason Mitchell Motorsports in the team's No. 98 and No. 78 Chevrolet. He had previously made his debut in the series the prior year at Kentucky for Mitchell's team, where he started and finished ninth in that race.

In 2019, Perkins focused on local racing, winning track championships at Irwindale Speedway and Kern County Raceway Park as well as winning the California title in the Whelen All-American Series.

Perkins returned to the West Series in 2020, joining Sunrise Ford Racing to drive their No. 9 Ford, replacing Jagger Jones as a driver on the team. Perkins' new teammate Trevor Huddleston drove the No. 9 in 2019 and moved to the No. 6, replacing Jones. Perkins earned his first win in the West Series in the second race of the Utah Motorsports Campus doubleheader on June 27. He also won the pole for the first race of the doubleheader, which was his first pole in the West Series. He finished eleventh in that race.

=== NASCAR Truck Series ===
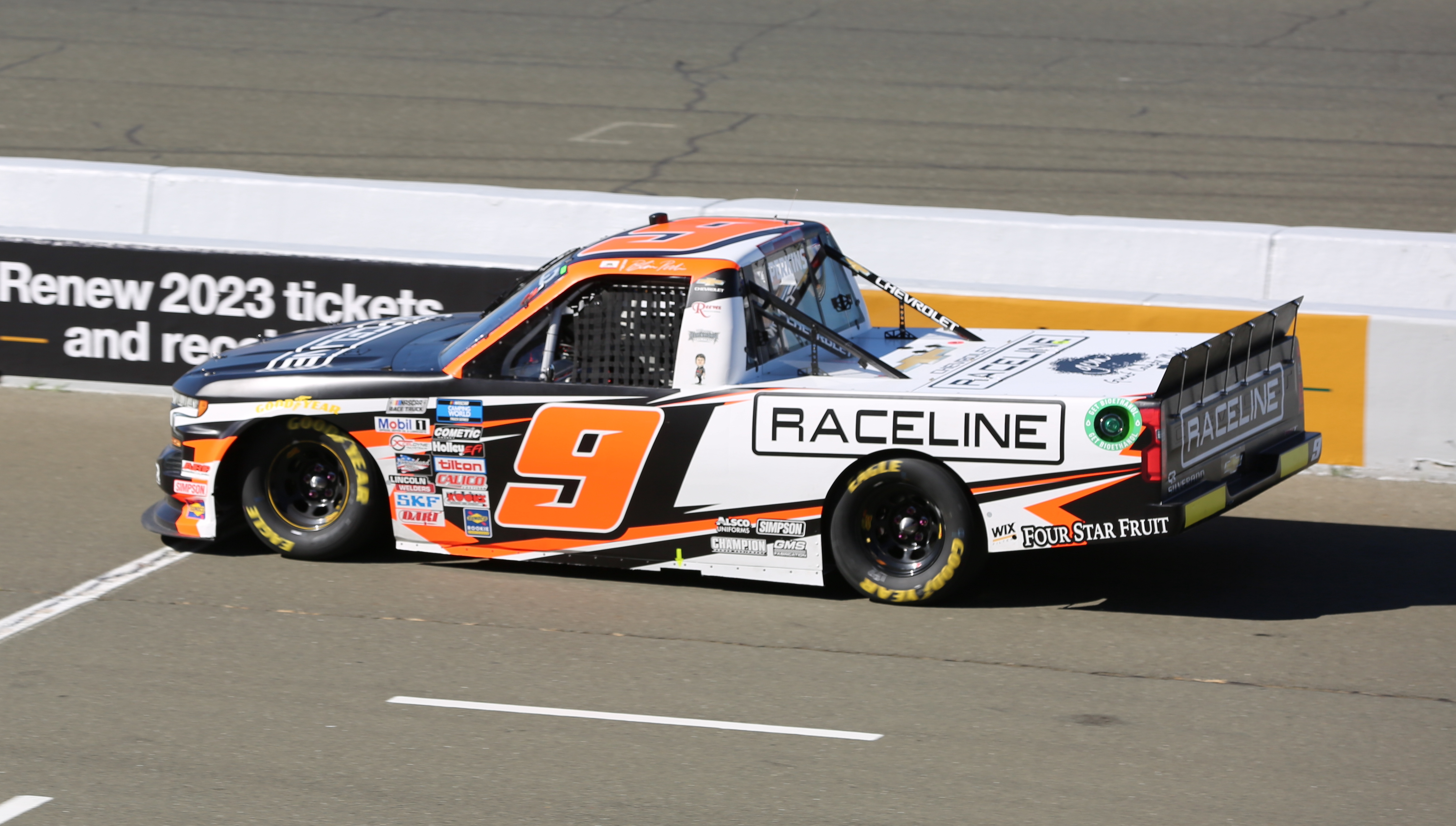
Perkins' No. 9 truck at Sonoma Raceway in 2022

On December 23, 2021, it was announced that Perkins would drive the No. 9 Chevrolet Silverado full-time for CR7 Motorsports in 2022. He struggled throughout the 2022 season, with his best result being an eighteenth-place finish at Nashville.

=== NASCAR O'Reilly Auto Parts Series ===
Perkins moved up to the NASCAR Xfinity Series in 2021, driving part-time for Our Motorsports in their new second car, the No. 03, for at least six races beginning at Martinsville in April. After the No. 03 failed to qualify for the first few races of the season due to it not having enough owner points with entry lists of over 40 cars, Our Motorsports acquired the No. 23 car jointly fielded by RSS Racing and Reaume Brothers Racing before the race at Las Vegas in March, and Perkins is now expected to instead run his races in that car. Perkins got his first career stage win in the Xfinity Series at Talladega, winning stage 2. He finished thirteenth in the end.

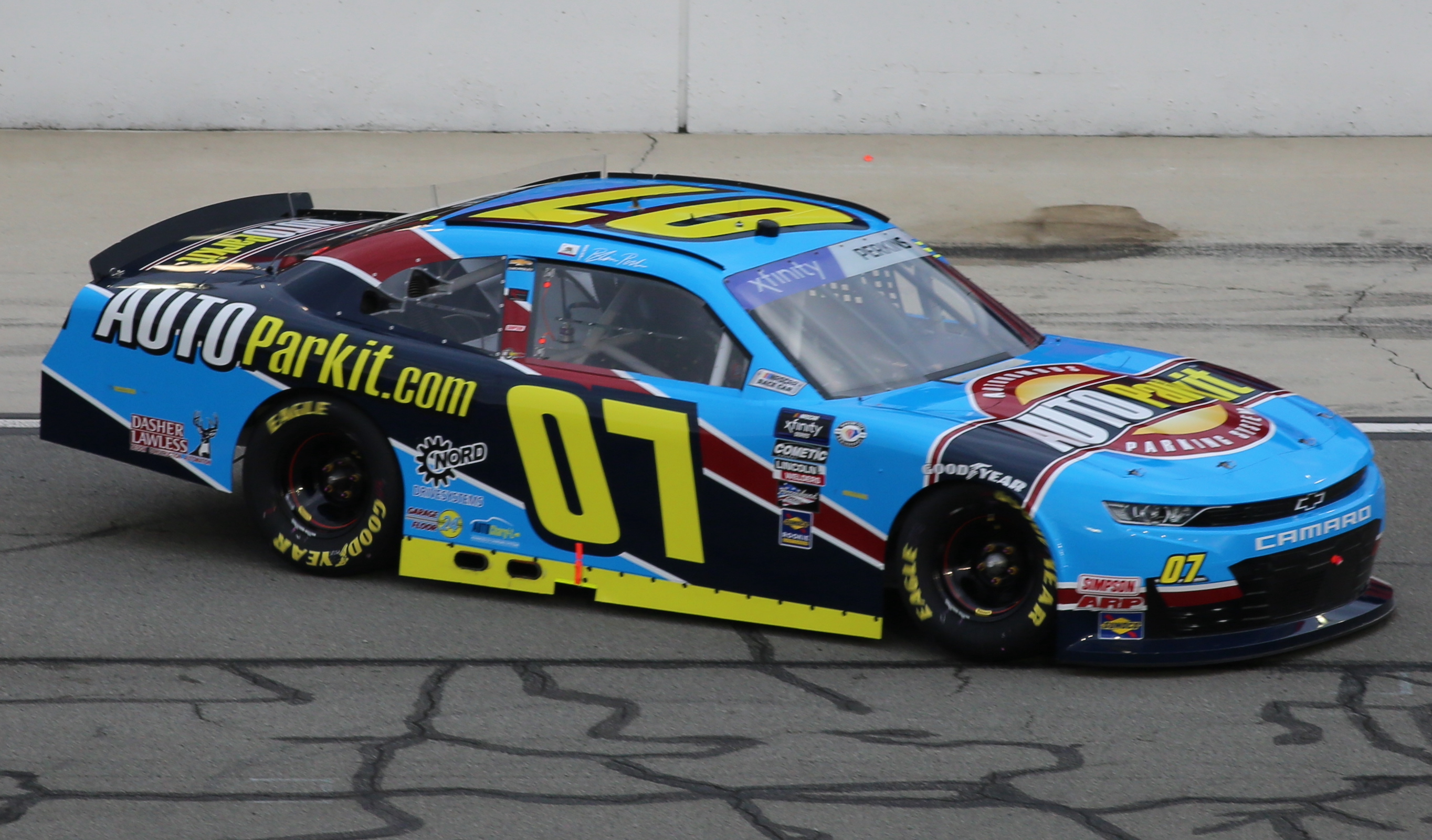
Perkins at Auto Club Speedway in 2023

On January 9, 2023, it was announced that Perkins would run full-time in the Xfinity Series in 2023, driving the No. 07 car for SS-Green Light Racing. He and the team would amicably agree to part ways after only five races. After not competing in the following race at Circuit of the Americas, he would rejoin Our Motorsports in the No. 02 at Richmond Raceway. On April 22, 2023, Perkins was involved in a very violent crash at Talladega Superspeedway where his car went upside down. It all started when Dexter Stacey spun and barely clipped Perkins in the right rear, sending Perkins spinning. His car went airborne on the backstretch after contact with Jade Buford and ended up barrel-rolling violently six times before it landed right side up. Perkins walked out under his own power and was taken to a local hospital for further evaluation. Perkins would finish the season 29th in the standings with the best finish of thirteenth at Martinsville in the spring.

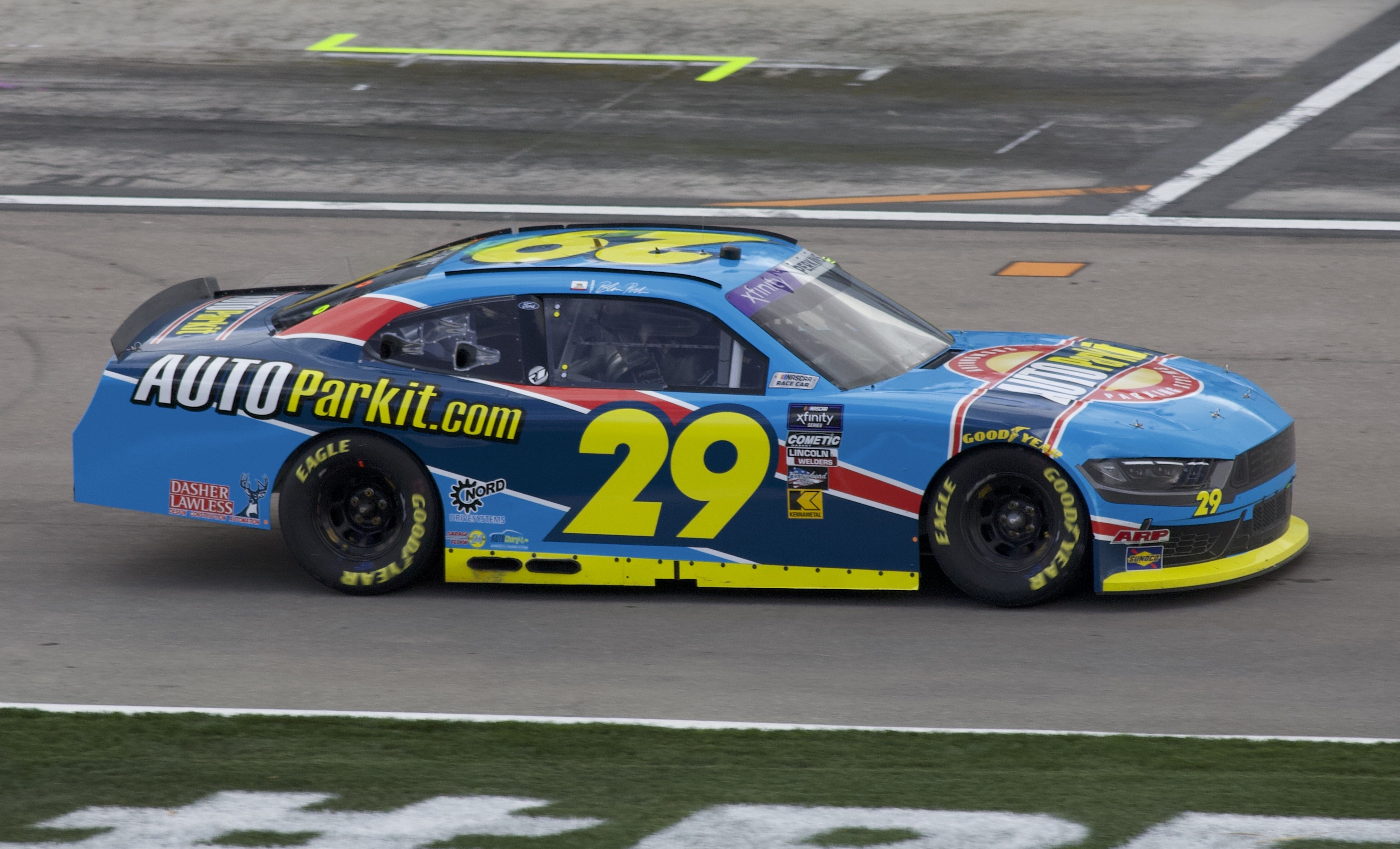
Perkins' No. 29 car at Las Vegas Motor Speedway in 2024.

On December 18, 2023, it was announced that Perkins would drive the No. 29 full-time for RSS Racing in 2024. Perkins scored no top-ten finishes during the season, his highest being a thirteenth at the Phoenix Spring race, and failed to qualify at Watkins Glen. He finished the year 27th in the final point standings, a slight improvement from 2023 but the worst out of all the full-time drivers.

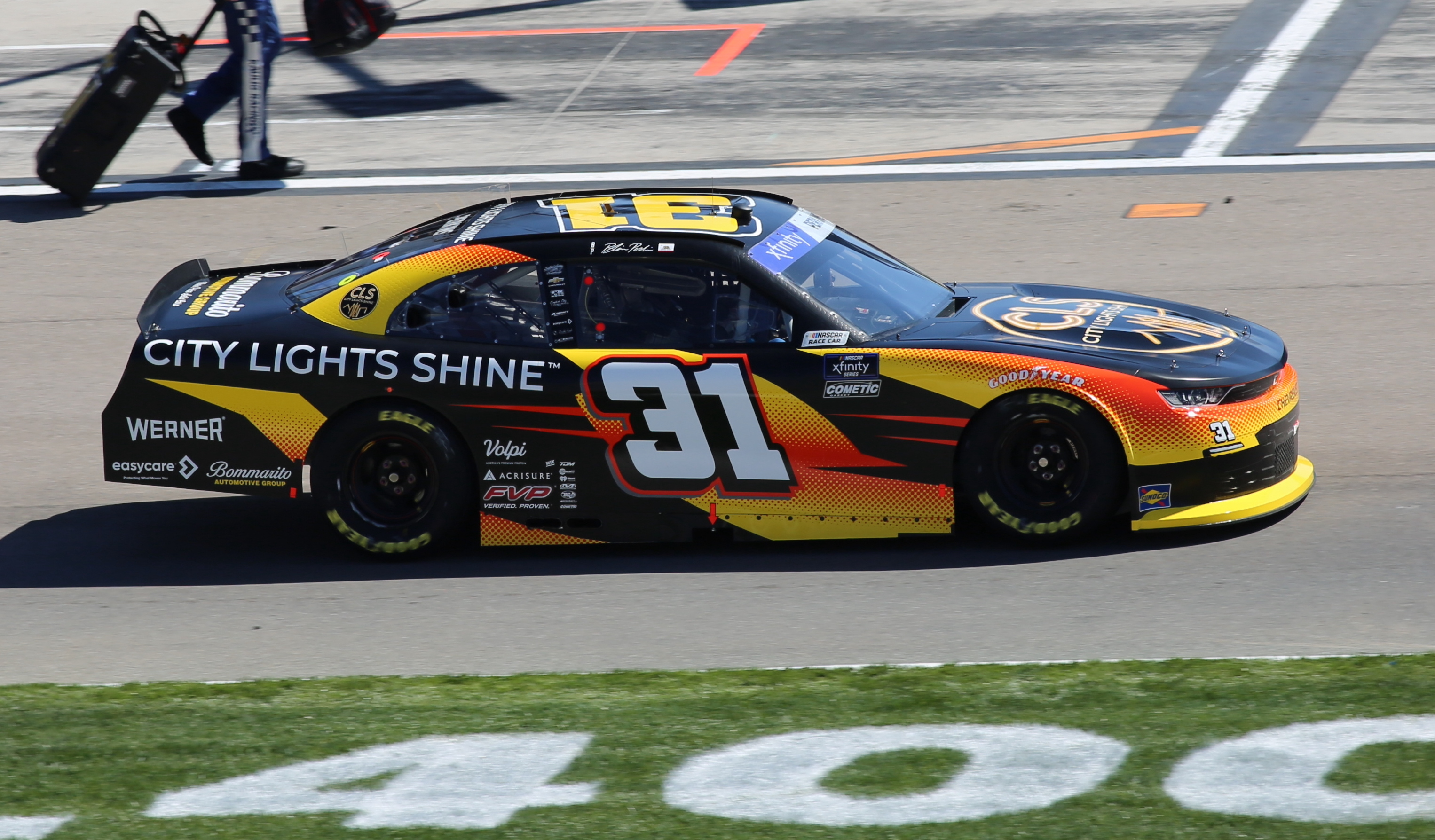
Perkins' No. 31 car at Las Vegas Motor Speedway in 2025

On December 6, 2024, it was announced that Perkins would compete in the No. 31 for Jordan Anderson Racing in 2025. He earned four top-ten finishes during the season, his highest coming at Talladega Superspeedway in October, where he finished in sixth-place. He finished the year 26th in the points standings. Perkins would return the JAR and the No. 31 for the 2026 season.

Perkins' No. 31 car at Las Vegas Motor Speedway in 2026

On October 13, 2026, it was announced that Perkins would drive the No. 24 Toyota for Sam Hunt Racing.

== Motorsports career results ==
=== Stock car career summary ===
Season	Series	Team	Races	Wins	Top 5	Top 10	Points	Position
2015	NASCAR K&N Pro Series West	Bill McAnally Racing	1	0	0	0	31	51st
2016	NASCAR K&N Pro Series West	Steve Portenga Racing	14	0	1	10	475	9th
2017	ARCA Racing Series	Mason Mitchell Motorsports	1	0	0	1	185	82nd
2017	NASCAR K&N Pro Series West	Steve Portenga Racing	14	0	0	6	436	10th
2018	ARCA Racing Series	Mason Mitchell Motorsports	4	0	0	1	705	28th
2020	ARCA Menards Series West	Sunrise Ford Racing	11	3	8	9	588	**2nd**
2021	NASCAR Xfinity Series	Our Motorsports	8	0	0	0	113	40th
2022	NASCAR Xfinity Series	Our Motorsports	5	0	0	1	0	NC†
2022	NASCAR Camping World Truck Series	CR7 Motorsports	23	0	0	0	203	29th
2022	ARCA Menards Series	Bill McAnally Racing	1	0	0	0	26	101st
2023	NASCAR Xfinity Series	SS-Green Light Racing	5	0	0	0	258	29th
2023	NASCAR Xfinity Series	Our Motorsports	25	0	0	0	258	29th
2024	NASCAR Xfinity Series	RSS Racing	32	0	0	0	350	27th
2025	NASCAR Xfinity Series	Jordan Anderson Racing	33	0	0	4	456	26th

^{†} As Perkins was a guest driver, he was ineligible for championship points.

=== NASCAR ===
(key) (Bold – Pole position awarded by qualifying time. Italics – Pole position earned by points standings or practice time. * – Most laps led.)

==== O'Reilly Auto Parts Series ====
NASCAR O'Reilly Auto Parts Series results
Year	Team	No.	Make	1	2	3	4	5	6	7	8	9	10	11	12	13	14	15	16	17	18	19	20	21	22	23	24	25	26	27	28	29	30	31	32	33	NOAPSC	Pts	Ref
2021	Our Motorsports	23	Chevy	DAY	DRC	HOM	LVS	PHO; 24	ATL; 30	MAR; 35	TAL	DAR	DOV	COA	CLT	MOH	TEX	NSH	POC; 34	ROA	ATL	NHA	GLN	IRC	MCH	DAY; 23	DAR	RCH	BRI	LVS; 20	TAL; 13	ROV	TEX	KAN	MAR	PHO; 16	40th	113	
2022	Our Motorsports	02	Chevy	DAY	CAL	LVS	PHO	ATL	COA	RCH	MAR	TAL	DOV	DAR	TEX	CLT	PIR	NSH	ROA	ATL	NHA	POC	IRC	MCH; 32	GLN; 29	DAY; 17	DAR	KAN	BRI	TEX	TAL; 36	ROV	LVS	HOM	MAR; 10	PHO	91st	0^{1}	
2023	SS-Green Light Racing	07	Chevy	DAY; 37	CAL; 31	LVS; 35	PHO; 35	ATL; 22	COA																												29th	258	
2023	Our Motorsports	02	Chevy							RCH; 26	MAR; 13	TAL; 34	DOV	DAR; 37	CLT; 37	PIR; 15	SON; 30	NSH; 26	CSC; 17	ATL; 32	NHA; 25	POC; 27	ROA; 17	MCH; 33	IRC; 31	GLN; 38	DAY; 25	DAR; 34	KAN; 33	BRI; 28	TEX; DNQ	ROV; 28	LVS; 28	HOM; 29	MAR; 22	PHO; 32	29th	258	
2024	RSS Racing	29	Ford	DAY; 14	ATL; 30	LVS; 31	PHO; 13	COA; 22	RCH; 33	MAR; 16	TEX; 35	TAL; 23	DOV; 36	DAR; 27	CLT; 35	PIR; 20	SON; 18	IOW; 35	NHA; 27	NSH; 35	CSC; 24	POC; 34	IND; 29	MCH; 23	DAY; 14	DAR; 34	ATL; 19	GLN; DNQ	BRI; 22	KAN; 28	TAL; 18	ROV; 33	LVS; 31	HOM; 34	MAR; 19	PHO; 22	27th	350	
2025	Jordan Anderson Racing	31	Chevy	DAY; 34	ATL; 19	COA; 10	PHO; 24	LVS; 26	HOM; 25	MAR; 19	DAR; 28	BRI; 30	CAR; 32	TAL; 7	TEX; 24	CLT; 24	NSH; 30	MXC; 27	POC; 29	ATL; 22	CSC; 18	SON; 19	DOV; 32	IND; 27	IOW; 28	GLN; 23	DAY; 14	PIR; 9	GTW; 23	BRI; 34	KAN; 36	ROV; 29	LVS; 27	TAL; 6	MAR; 20	PHO; 25	26th	456	
2026	Jordan Anderson Racing	31	Chevy	DAY; 8	ATL; 36	COA; 17	PHO; 28	LVS; 22	DAR; 30	MAR; 17	CAR; 23	BRI; 22	KAN; 23	TAL; 12	TEX; 25	GLN; 26	DOV; 34	CLT; 24	NSH; 20	POC; 20	COR; 13	SON; 30	CHI; 32	ATL; 20	IND; 28	IOW; 20	DAY; 15	DAR; 22	GTW; 20	BRI; 34	LVS; 31	CLT; 19	PHO; 24	TAL; 7	MAR; 33	HOM; 28	22nd	472	

==== Camping World Truck Series ====
NASCAR Camping World Truck Series results
Year	Team	No.	Make	1	2	3	4	5	6	7	8	9	10	11	12	13	14	15	16	17	18	19	20	21	22	23	NCWTC	Pts	Ref
2022	CR7 Motorsports	9	Chevy	DAY; 31	LVS; 35	ATL; 29	COA; 35	MAR; DNQ	BRD; 25	DAR; 31	KAN; 32	TEX; 26	CLT; 30	GTW; 22	SON; 21	KNX; 25	NSH; 18	MOH; 30	POC; 29	IRP; 26	RCH; 34	KAN; 30	BRI; 28	TAL; 27	HOM; 22	PHO; 25	29th	203	

^{*} Season still in progress
^{1} Ineligible for series points

=== ARCA Menards Series ===
(key) (Bold – Pole position awarded by qualifying time. Italics – Pole position earned by points standings or practice time. * – Most laps led. ** – All laps led.)

ARCA Menards Series results
Year	Team	No.	Make	1	2	3	4	5	6	7	8	9	10	11	12	13	14	15	16	17	18	19	20	AMSC	Pts	Ref
2017	Mason Mitchell Motorsports	78	Chevy	DAY	NSH	SLM	TAL	TOL	ELK	POC	MCH	MAD	IOW	IRP	POC	WIN	ISF	ROA	DSF	SLM	CHI	KEN; 9	KAN	82nd	185	
2018	Mason Mitchell Motorsports	98	Chevy	DAY	NSH	SLM	TAL; 13	TOL	CLT	POC; 12	MCH	MAD	GTW	CHI; 11	IOW									28th	705	
2018	Mason Mitchell Motorsports	78	Chevy													ELK; 8	POC	ISF	BLN	DSF	SLM	IRP	KAN	28th	705	
2022	Bill McAnally Racing	99	Chevy	DAY	PHO	TAL	KAN	CLT	IOW	BLN	ELK	MOH; 18	POC	IRP	MCH	GLN	ISF	MLW	DSF	KAN	BRI	SLM	TOL	101st	26	

==== ARCA Menards Series West ====
ARCA Menards Series West results
Year	Team	No.	Make	1	2	3	4	5	6	7	8	9	10	11	12	13	14	AMSWC	Pts	Ref
2015	Bill McAnally Racing	54	Toyota	KCR	IRW	TUS	IOW	SHA	SON	SLS	IOW	EVG	CNS	MER	AAS	PHO; 13		51st	31	
2016	Steve Portenga Racing	21	Chevy	IRW; 18	KCR; 16	TUS; 8	OSS; 9	CNS; 5	SON; 21	SLS; 11	IOW; 7	EVG; 7	DCS; 8	MMP; 6	MMP; 6	MER; 10	AAS; 9	9th	475	
2017	Steve Portenga Racing	21	Chevy	KCR; 11	TUS; 8	IRW; 7	IRW; 9	SPO; 18	OSS; 11	CNS; 20	SON; 7	IOW; 21	EVG; 16	DCS; 17	MER; 8	AAS; 8	KCR; 19	10th	436	
2020	Sunrise Ford Racing	9	Ford	LVS; 3	**MMP**; 11	MMP; 1**	IRW; 4	**EVG**; 1**	DCS; 1*	CNS; 2	LVS; 10	AAS; 5	KCR; 3	PHO; 25				2nd	588	
