= 2022 Sunoco Go Rewards 200 at The Glen =

22nd race of the 2022 NASCAR Xfinity Series

Race details
- Race 22 of 33 of the 2022 NASCAR Xfinity Series
- Date: August 20, 2022
- Location: Watkins Glen International, Watkins Glen, New York
- Course: Permanent racing facility
- Course length: 2.454 miles (3.949 km)
- Distance: 82 laps, 201.228 mi (323.845 km)
- Scheduled distance: 82 laps, 201.228 mi (323.845 km)
- Average speed: 77.651 mph (124.967 km/h)

Pole position
Driver	William Byron	Hendrick Motorsports
- Time: 1:10.548

Most laps led
Driver	William Byron	Hendrick Motorsports
- Laps: 35

Winner
No. 88	Kyle Larson	JR Motorsports

Television in the United States
- Network: USA Network
- Announcers: Rick Allen, Steve Letarte (booth), Mike Bagley (Esses), Dale Earnhardt Jr. (Turn 5) and Jeff Burton (Turns 6–7)

Radio in the United States
- Radio: Motor Racing Network

The 2022 Sunoco Go Rewards 200 at The Glen was the 22nd stock car race of the 2022 NASCAR Xfinity Series, and the 28th iteration of the event. The race was held on Saturday, August 20, 2022, in Watkins Glen, New York at Watkins Glen International, a 2.454 miles (3.949 km) permanent road course. The race took the scheduled 82 laps to complete. After Ty Gibbs and William Byron spun for the lead with 5 laps to go, Kyle Larson, driving for JR Motorsports, took over the lead and held off A. J. Allmendinger for his 13th career NASCAR Xfinity Series win, and his first of the season. Byron and Gibbs had dominated the race, leading 35 and 25 laps. To fill out the podium, Sammy Smith, driving for Joe Gibbs Racing, would finish 3rd, respectively.

This was the debut race for Brad Perez. Austin Wayne Self was also scheduled to make his debut in this race, but had failed to qualify.

== Background ==
Watkins Glen International, nicknamed "The Glen", is an automobile race track located in the town of Dix just southwest of the village of Watkins Glen, New York, at the southern tip of Seneca Lake. It was long known around the world as the home of the Formula One United States Grand Prix, which it hosted for twenty consecutive years (1961–1980). In addition, the site has also been home to road racing of nearly every class, including the World Sportscar Championship, Trans-Am, Can-Am, NASCAR Cup Series, the International Motor Sports Association and the IndyCar Series. The facility is currently owned by NASCAR.

=== Entry list ===
- (R) denotes rookie driver.
- (i) denotes driver who are ineligible for series driver points.

#	Driver	Team	Make
1	Sam Mayer	JR Motorsports	Chevrolet
02	Blaine Perkins (i)	Our Motorsports	Chevrolet
2	Sheldon Creed (R)	Richard Childress Racing	Chevrolet
4	Bayley Currey	JD Motorsports	Chevrolet
5	Brandon Brown	B. J. McLeod Motorsports	Chevrolet
6	Spencer Pumpelly	JD Motorsports	Chevrolet
07	Cole Custer (i)	SS-Green Light Racing	Ford
7	Justin Allgaier	JR Motorsports	Chevrolet
08	Andy Lally	SS-Green Light Racing	Ford
8	Josh Berry	JR Motorsports	Chevrolet
9	Noah Gragson	JR Motorsports	Chevrolet
10	Landon Cassill	Kaulig Racing	Chevrolet
11	Daniel Hemric	Kaulig Racing	Chevrolet
16	A. J. Allmendinger	Kaulig Racing	Chevrolet
17	William Byron (i)	Hendrick Motorsports	Chevrolet
18	Sammy Smith	Joe Gibbs Racing	Toyota
19	Brandon Jones	Joe Gibbs Racing	Toyota
21	Austin Hill (R)	Richard Childress Racing	Chevrolet
23	Anthony Alfredo	Our Motorsports	Chevrolet
26	Connor Mosack (i)	Sam Hunt Racing	Toyota
27	Jeb Burton	Our Motorsports	Chevrolet
31	Myatt Snider	Jordan Anderson Racing	Chevrolet
32	Austin Wayne Self (i)	Jordan Anderson Racing	Chevrolet
34	Kyle Weatherman	Jesse Iwuji Motorsports	Chevrolet
35	Brad Perez (i)	Emerling-Gase Motorsports	Toyota
36	Alex Labbé	DGM Racing	Chevrolet
38	Patrick Gallagher	RSS Racing	Ford
39	Ryan Sieg	RSS Racing	Ford
44	Stefan Parsons	Alpha Prime Racing	Chevrolet
45	Josh Bilicki (i)	Alpha Prime Racing	Chevrolet
47	Stanton Barrett	Mike Harmon Racing	Chevrolet
48	Kaz Grala (i)	Big Machine Racing	Chevrolet
51	Jeremy Clements	Jeremy Clements Racing	Chevrolet
54	Ty Gibbs	Joe Gibbs Racing	Toyota
66	Timmy Hill (i)	MBM Motorsports	Ford
68	Kris Wright (i)	Brandonbilt Motorsports	Chevrolet
78	Scott Heckert	B. J. McLeod Motorsports	Chevrolet
88	Kyle Larson (i)	JR Motorsports	Chevrolet
91	Preston Pardus	DGM Racing	Chevrolet
92	Ross Chastain (i)	DGM Racing	Chevrolet
98	Riley Herbst	Stewart-Haas Racing	Ford
Official entry list

== Practice ==
The only 30-minute practice session was held on Saturday, August 20, at 10:00 AM EST. A. J. Allmendinger, driving for Kaulig Racing, was the fastest in the session, with a lap of 1:11.885, and an average speed of 122.696 mph (197.460 km/h).

Pos.	#	Driver	Team	Make	Time	Speed
1	16	A. J. Allmendinger	Kaulig Racing	Chevrolet	1:11.885	122.696
2	54	Ty Gibbs	Joe Gibbs Racing	Toyota	1:12.119	122.298
3	17	William Byron (i)	Hendrick Motorsports	Chevrolet	1:12.125	122.288
Full practice results

== Qualifying ==
Qualifying was held on Saturday, August 20, at 10:30 AM EST. Since Watkins Glen International is a road course, the qualifying system used is a two group system, with two rounds. Drivers will be separated into two groups, Group A and Group B. The fastest 5 drivers from each group will advance to the final round. Drivers will also have multiple laps to set a time. The fastest driver to set a time in the round will win the pole. William Byron, driving for Hendrick Motorsports, scored the pole for the race, with a lap of 1:10.548, and an average speed of 125.021 mph (201.202 km/h). With that lap, Byron also broke the track record.

Pos.	#	Driver	Team	Make	Time (R1)	Speed (R1)	Time (R2)	Speed (R2)
1	17	William Byron (i)	Hendrick Motorsports	Chevrolet	1:10.789	124.596	1:10.548	125.021
2	54	Ty Gibbs	Joe Gibbs Racing	Toyota	1:11.223	123.836	1:10.840	124.506
3	88	Kyle Larson (i)	JR Motorsports	Chevrolet	1:11.509	123.341	1:11.260	123.772
4	16	A. J. Allmendinger	Kaulig Racing	Chevrolet	1:11.516	123.329	1:11.316	123.675
5	07	Cole Custer (i)	SS-Green Light Racing	Ford	1:11.337	123.639	1:11.460	123.426
6	98	Riley Herbst	Stewart-Haas Racing	Ford	1:11.499	123.358	1:11.540	123.288
7	1	Sam Mayer	JR Motorsports	Chevrolet	1:11.357	123.604	1:11.692	123.026
8	21	Austin Hill (R)	Richard Childress Racing	Chevrolet	1:11.439	123.462	1:11.827	122.795
9	11	Daniel Hemric	Kaulig Racing	Chevrolet	1:11.884	122.698	1:12.084	122.357
10	7	Justin Allgaier	JR Motorsports	Chevrolet	1:11.721	122.977	-	-
Eliminated from Round 1
11	2	Sheldon Creed (R)	Richard Childress Racing	Chevrolet	1:11.787	122.863	-	-
12	19	Brandon Jones	Joe Gibbs Racing	Toyota	1:11.934	122.612	-	-
13	26	Connor Mosack (i)	Sam Hunt Racing	Toyota	1:11.937	122.607	-	-
14	48	Kaz Grala (i)	Big Machine Racing	Chevrolet	1:11.956	122.575	-	-
15	92	Ross Chastain (i)	DGM Racing	Chevrolet	1:11.971	122.549	-	-
16	9	Noah Gragson	JR Motorsports	Chevrolet	1:11.994	122.510	-	-
17	8	Josh Berry	JR Motorsports	Chevrolet	1:12.007	122.488	-	-
18	36	Alex Labbé	DGM Racing	Chevrolet	1:12.016	122.473	-	-
19	18	Sammy Smith	Joe Gibbs Racing	Toyota	1:12.064	122.391	-	-
20	10	Landon Cassill	Kaulig Racing	Chevrolet	1:12.273	122.037	-	-
21	45	Stefan Parsons (i)	Alpha Prime Racing	Chevrolet	1:12.291	122.007	-	-
22	51	Jeremy Clements	Jeremy Clements Racing	Chevrolet	1:12.302	121.988	-	-
23	44	Josh Bilicki (i)	Alpha Prime Racing	Chevrolet	1:12.587	121.509	-	-
24	38	Patrick Gallagher	RSS Racing	Ford	1:12.617	121.459	-	-
25	34	Kyle Weatherman	Jesse Iwuji Motorsports	Chevrolet	1:12.707	121.309	-	-
26	23	Anthony Alfredo	Our Motorsports	Chevrolet	1:12.786	121.177	-	-
27	35	Brad Perez (i)	Emerling-Gase Motorsports	Toyota	1:12.800	121.154	-	-
28	27	Jeb Burton	Our Motorsports	Chevrolet	1:12.825	121.112	-	-
29	31	Myatt Snider	Jordan Anderson Racing	Chevrolet	1:12.873	121.032	-	-
30	5	Brandon Brown	B. J. McLeod Motorsports	Chevrolet	1:13.192	120.505	-	-
31	91	Preston Pardus	DGM Racing	Chevrolet	1:13.270	120.377	-	-
32	78	Scott Heckert	B. J. McLeod Motorsports	Chevrolet	1:13.416	120.137	-	-
33	08	Andy Lally	SS-Green Light Racing	Ford	1:13.536	119.941	-	-
Qualified by owner's points
34	39	Ryan Sieg	RSS Racing	Ford	1:13.597	119.842	-	-
35	66	Timmy Hill (i)	MBM Motorsports	Chevrolet	1:13.639	119.773	-	-
36	68	Kris Wright (i)	Brandonbilt Motorsports	Chevrolet	1:13.820	119.480	-	-
37	4	Bayley Currey	JD Motorsports	Chevrolet	1:14.078	119.064	-	-
38	02	Blaine Perkins (i)	Our Motorsports	Chevrolet	1:15.083	117.470	-	-
Failed to qualify
39	32	Austin Wayne Self (i)	Jordan Anderson Racing	Chevrolet	1:13.985	119.213	-	-
40	6	Spencer Pumpelly	JD Motorsports	Chevrolet	1:14.284	118.734	-	-
41	47	Stanton Barrett	Mike Harmon Racing	Chevrolet	1:15.990	116.068	-	-
Official qualifying results
Official starting lineup

== Race results ==
Stage 1 Laps: 20

Pos.	#	Driver	Team	Make	Pts
1	18	Sammy Smith	Joe Gibbs Racing	Toyota	10
2	16	A. J. Allmendinger	Kaulig Racing	Chevrolet	9
3	48	Kaz Grala (i)	Big Machine Racing	Chevrolet	0
4	51	Jeremy Clements	Jeremy Clements Racing	Chevrolet	7
5	34	Kyle Weatherman	Jesse Iwuji Motorsports	Chevrolet	6
6	45	Josh Bilicki (i)	Alpha Prime Racing	Chevrolet	0
7	17	William Byron (i)	Hendrick Motorsports	Chevrolet	0
8	2	Sheldon Creed (R)	Richard Childress Racing	Chevrolet	3
9	88	Kyle Larson (i)	JR Motorsports	Chevrolet	0
10	08	Andy Lally	SS-Green Light Racing	Ford	1

Stage 2 Laps: 20

Pos.	#	Driver	Team	Make	Pts
1	17	William Byron (i)	Hendrick Motorsports	Chevrolet	0
2	54	Ty Gibbs	Joe Gibbs Racing	Toyota	9
3	16	A. J. Allmendinger	Kaulig Racing	Chevrolet	8
4	9	Noah Gragson	JR Motorsports	Chevrolet	7
5	88	Kyle Larson (i)	JR Motorsports	Chevrolet	0
6	2	Sheldon Creed (R)	Richard Childress Racing	Chevrolet	5
7	8	Josh Berry	JR Motorsports	Chevrolet	4
8	48	Kaz Grala (i)	Big Machine Racing	Chevrolet	0
9	92	Ross Chastain (i)	DGM Racing	Chevrolet	0
10	26	Connor Mosack (i)	Sam Hunt Racing	Toyota	0

Stage 3 Laps: 42

Fin.	St	#	Driver	Team	Make	Laps	Led	Status	Pts
1	3	88	Kyle Larson (i)	JR Motorsports	Chevrolet	82	7	Running	0
2	4	16	A. J. Allmendinger	Kaulig Racing	Chevrolet	82	3	Running	52
3	19	18	Sammy Smith	Joe Gibbs Racing	Toyota	82	6	Running	44
4	16	9	Noah Gragson	JR Motorsports	Chevrolet	82	0	Running	40
5	14	48	Kaz Grala (i)	Big Machine Racing	Chevrolet	82	0	Running	0
6	7	1	Sam Mayer	JR Motorsports	Chevrolet	82	0	Running	31
7	6	98	Riley Herbst	Stewart-Haas Racing	Ford	82	4	Running	30
8	11	2	Sheldon Creed (R)	Richard Childress Racing	Chevrolet	82	0	Running	37
9	17	8	Josh Berry	JR Motorsports	Chevrolet	82	0	Running	32
10	22	51	Jeremy Clements	Jeremy Clements Racing	Chevrolet	82	2	Running	34
11	5	07	Cole Custer (i)	SS-Green Light Racing	Ford	82	0	Running	0
12	23	44	Stefan Parsons (i)	Alpha Prime Racing	Chevrolet	82	0	Running	0
13	34	39	Ryan Sieg	RSS Racing	Ford	82	0	Running	24
14	35	66	Timmy Hill (i)	MBM Motorsports	Chevrolet	82	0	Running	0
15	13	26	Connor Mosack (i)	Sam Hunt Racing	Toyota	82	0	Running	0
16	20	10	Landon Cassill	Kaulig Racing	Chevrolet	82	0	Running	21
17	21	45	Josh Bilicki (i)	Alpha Prime Racing	Chevrolet	82	0	Running	0
18	26	23	Anthony Alfredo	Our Motorsports	Chevrolet	82	0	Running	19
19	33	08	Andy Lally	SS-Green Light Racing	Ford	82	0	Running	19
20	27	35	Brad Perez (i)	Emerling-Gase Motorsports	Toyota	82	0	Running	0
21	31	91	Preston Pardus	DGM Racing	Chevrolet	82	0	Running	16
22	25	34	Kyle Weatherman	Jesse Iwuji Motorsports	Chevrolet	82	0	Running	21
23	32	78	Scott Heckert	B. J. McLeod Motorsports	Chevrolet	82	0	Running	14
24	12	19	Brandon Jones	Joe Gibbs Racing	Toyota	82	0	Running	13
25	1	17	William Byron (i)	Hendrick Motorsports	Chevrolet	82	35	Running	0
26	37	4	Bayley Currey	JD Motorsports	Chevrolet	82	0	Running	11
27	2	54	Ty Gibbs	Joe Gibbs Racing	Toyota	82	25	Running	19
28	15	92	Ross Chastain (i)	DGM Racing	Chevrolet	81	0	Running	0
29	38	02	Blaine Perkins (i)	Our Motorsports	Chevrolet	80	0	Running	0
30	8	21	Austin Hill (R)	Richard Childress Racing	Chevrolet	73	0	Running	7
31	9	11	Daniel Hemric	Kaulig Racing	Chevrolet	58	0	Accident	6
32	30	5	Brandon Brown	B. J. McLeod Motorsports	Chevrolet	51	0	Axle	5
33	29	31	Myatt Snider	Jordan Anderson Racing	Chevrolet	50	0	Accident	4
34	36	68	Kris Wright (i)	Brandonbilt Motorsports	Chevrolet	30	0	Driveshaft	0
35	18	36	Alex Labbé	DGM Racing	Chevrolet	26	0	Accident	2
36	24	38	Patrick Gallagher	RSS Racing	Ford	14	0	Rear Gear	1
37	28	27	Jeb Burton	Our Motorsports	Chevrolet	8	0	Accident	1
38	10	7	Justin Allgaier	JR Motorsports	Chevrolet	4	0	Accident	1
Official race results

== Standings after the race ==
Drivers' Championship standings

	Pos	Driver	Points
	1	A. J. Allmendinger	887
1	2	Ty Gibbs	826 (-61)
1	3	Justin Allgaier	817 (-70)
	4	Noah Gragson	788 (-99)
	5	Josh Berry	769 (-118)
	6	Austin Hill	671 (-216)
	7	Brandon Jones	647 (-240)
	8	Riley Herbst	613 (-274)
	9	Sam Mayer	609 (-278)
	10	Daniel Hemric	551 (-336)
	11	Landon Cassill	534 (-353)
	12	Ryan Sieg	523 (-364)
Official driver's standings

- Note: Only the first 12 positions are included for the driver standings.

Previous race: 2022 New Holland 250	NASCAR Xfinity Series; 2022 season	Next race: 2022 Wawa 250
