= 2022 DoorDash 250 =

Twelfth race of the 2022 NASCAR Camping World Truck Series

Race details
- Race 12 of 23 of the 2022 NASCAR Camping World Truck Series
- Date: June 11, 2022
- Official name: Fifth Annual DoorDash 250
- Location: Sonoma, California, Sonoma Raceway
- Course: Permanent racing facility
- Course length: 2.385 miles (3.838 km)
- Distance: 75 laps, 149.25 mi (240.19 km)
- Average speed: 68.612 mph (110.420 km/h)

Pole position
Driver	Carson Hocevar	Niece Motorsports
- Time: 1:18.607

Most laps led
Driver	Kyle Busch	Kyle Busch Motorsports
- Laps: 45

Winner
No. 51	Kyle Busch	Kyle Busch Motorsports

Television in the United States
- Network: Fox Sports 1
- Announcers: Vince Welch, Andy Lally, and Michael Waltrip

Radio in the United States
- Radio: Motor Racing Network

The 2022 DoorDash 250 was the twelfth stock car race of the 2022 NASCAR Camping World Truck Series, and the fifth iteration of the event. The race was held on Saturday, June 11, 2022, in Sonoma, California at Sonoma Raceway, a 2.385 miles (3.838 km) permanent road course. The race took the scheduled 75 laps to complete. At race's end, Kyle Busch, driving for his own team, Kyle Busch Motorsports, put on a dominant performance, leading 45 laps for his 62nd career NASCAR Camping World Truck Series win, and his first of the season. To fill out the podium, Zane Smith of Front Row Motorsports, and Ty Majeski of ThorSport Racing, would finish 2nd and 3rd, respectively.

This was also the first NASCAR Camping World Truck Series race held at Sonoma Raceway for the first time since 1998.

== Background ==
Sonoma Raceway is a road course and dragstrip located at Sears Point in the southern Sonoma Mountains of Sonoma County, California. The road course features 12 turns on a hilly course with 160 feet (49 m) of total elevation change. It is host to one of the few NASCAR races each year that are run on road courses. It has also played host to the IndyCar Series, the NHRA Camping World Drag Racing Series, and several other auto races and motorcycle races such as the American Federation of Motorcyclists series. Sonoma Raceway continues to host amateur, or club racing events with some open to the public. The largest such car club is the Sports Car Club of America. The track is 30 mi (48 km) north of San Francisco and Oakland.

=== Entry list ===
- (R) denotes rookie driver.
- (i) denotes driver who are ineligible for series driver points.

#	Driver	Team	Make
1	Hailie Deegan	David Gilliland Racing	Ford
02	Kaz Grala	Young's Motorsports	Chevrolet
4	John Hunter Nemechek	Kyle Busch Motorsports	Toyota
7	Alex Bowman (i)	Spire Motorsports	Chevrolet
9	Blaine Perkins (R)	CR7 Motorsports	Chevrolet
12	Spencer Boyd	Young's Motorsports	Chevrolet
15	Tanner Gray	David Gilliland Racing	Ford
16	Tyler Ankrum	Hattori Racing Enterprises	Toyota
17	Harrison Burton (i)	David Gilliland Racing	Ford
18	Chandler Smith	Kyle Busch Motorsports	Toyota
19	Derek Kraus	McAnally–Hilgemann Racing	Chevrolet
20	Austin Dillon (i)	Young's Motorsports	Chevrolet
23	Grant Enfinger	GMS Racing	Chevrolet
24	Jack Wood (R)	GMS Racing	Chevrolet
25	Matt DiBenedetto	Rackley W.A.R.	Chevrolet
30	Josh Bilicki (i) (Note: After Colin Garrett's mandated drug test didn't come back in time for practice, Josh Bilicki would drive the No. 30 truck for the race. This is the same situation that happened with Travis McCullough, as he also wasn't allowed to participate in the race because of an unknown drug test result.)	On Point Motorsports	Toyota
33	Jade Buford (i)	Reaume Brothers Racing	Toyota
38	Zane Smith	Front Row Motorsports	Ford
40	Dean Thompson (R)	Niece Motorsports	Chevrolet
41	Ross Chastain (i)	Niece Motorsports	Chevrolet
42	Carson Hocevar (Note: After having surgery on his right tibia during a crash in the 2022 Toyota 200, Hocevar and Daniel Suárez would split the No. 42 truck for practice. Suárez will also serve as a standby driver for Hocevar during the race.)	Niece Motorsports	Chevrolet
43	Brad Perez	Reaume Brothers Racing	Toyota
44	Kris Wright	Niece Motorsports	Chevrolet
45	Lawless Alan (R)	Niece Motorsports	Chevrolet
46	Stefan Parsons (i) (Note: Originally, Mason Filippi was scheduled to drive the No. 46 truck, but after Stefan Parsons failed to qualify in the No. 47 truck, Parsons took over the No. 46 truck.)	G2G Racing	Toyota
51	Kyle Busch (i)	Kyle Busch Motorsports	Toyota
52	Stewart Friesen	Halmar Friesen Racing	Toyota
56	Timmy Hill	Hill Motorsports	Toyota
61	Chase Purdy	Hattori Racing Enterprises	Toyota
62	Todd Bodine	Halmar Friesen Racing	Toyota
66	Ty Majeski	ThorSport Racing	Toyota
75	Parker Kligerman	Henderson Motorsports	Chevrolet
88	Matt Crafton	ThorSport Racing	Toyota
91	Colby Howard	McAnally–Hilgemann Racing	Chevrolet
98	Christian Eckes	ThorSport Racing	Toyota
99	Ben Rhodes	ThorSport Racing	Toyota
Official entry list

== Practice ==
The only 50-minute practice session was held on Friday, June 10, at 3:05 PM PST. Christian Eckes, driving for ThorSport Racing, would set the fastest time in the session, with a time of 1:21.040 seconds, and a speed of 88.401 mph (142.268 km/h).

Pos.	#	Driver	Team	Make	Time	Speed
1	98	Christian Eckes	ThorSport Racing	Toyota	1:21.040	88.401
2	7	Alex Bowman (i)	Spire Motorsports	Chevrolet	1:21.177	88.252
3	41	Ross Chastain (i)	Niece Motorsports	Chevrolet	1:21.178	88.250
Full practice results

== Qualifying ==
Qualifying was held on Saturday, June 11, at 10:05 AM PST. Since Sonoma Raceway is a road course, the qualifying system used is a two group system, with two rounds. Drivers will be separated into two groups, Group A and Group B. Each driver will have a lap to set a time. The fastest 5 drivers from each group will advance to the final round. Drivers will also have one lap to set a time. The fastest driver to set a time in the round will win the pole.

Carson Hocevar, driving for Niece Motorsports, originally scored the pole for the race with a time of 1:18.609 seconds, and a speed of 91.135 mph (146.668 km/h). However, shortly after making the lap, he would spin in turn 10, and collect the tire barriers. Hocevar will move to a backup truck, with Ross Chastain taking over the pole position.

=== Full qualifying results ===
Pos	#	Driver	Team	Make	Time (R1)	Speed (R1)	Time (R2)	Speed (R2)
1	42	Carson Hocevar	Niece Motorsports	Chevrolet	1:18.607	91.137	1:18.609	91.135
2	41	Ross Chastain (i)	Niece Motorsports	Chevrolet	1:19.113	90.554	1:19.167	90.492
3	51	Kyle Busch (i)	Kyle Busch Motorsports	Toyota	1:18.863	90.841	1:19.223	90.428
4	66	Ty Majeski	ThorSport Racing	Toyota	1:19.812	89.761	1:19.328	90.309
5	16	Tyler Ankrum	Hattori Racing Enterprises	Toyota	1:19.882	89.682	1:19.552	90.054
6	7	Alex Bowman (i)	Spire Motorsports	Chevrolet	1:19.016	90.665	1:19.766	89.813
7	4	John Hunter Nemechek	Kyle Busch Motorsports	Toyota	1:19.437	90.185	1:19.973	89.580
8	23	Grant Enfinger	GMS Racing	Chevrolet	1:19.570	90.034	1:20.298	89.218
9	1	Hailie Deegan	David Gilliland Racing	Ford	1:19.957	89.598	1:20.444	89.056
10	52	Stewart Friesen	Halmar Friesen Racing	Toyota	1:19.977	89.576	1:20.592	88.892
Eliminated from Round 1
11	75	Parker Kligerman	Henderson Motorsports	Chevrolet	1:19.589	90.012	-	-
12	25	Matt DiBenedetto	Rackley W.A.R.	Chevrolet	1:19.592	90.009	-	-
13	38	Zane Smith	Front Row Motorsports	Ford	1:19.610	89.989	-	-
14	18	Chandler Smith	Kyle Busch Motorsports	Toyota	1:19.818	89.754	-	-
15	19	Derek Kraus	McAnally–Hilgemann Racing	Chevrolet	1:20.014	89.534	-	-
16	20	Austin Dillon (i)	Young's Motorsports	Chevrolet	1:20.193	89.334	-	-
17	99	Ben Rhodes	ThorSport Racing	Toyota	1:20.238	89.284	-	-
18	98	Christian Eckes	ThorSport Racing	Toyota	1:20.242	89.280	-	-
19	45	Lawless Alan (R)	Niece Motorsports	Chevrolet	1:20.302	89.213	-	-
20	02	Kaz Grala	Young's Motorsports	Chevrolet	1:20.325	89.188	-	-
21	56	Timmy Hill	Hill Motorsports	Toyota	1:20.495	88.999	-	-
22	91	Colby Howard	McAnally–Hilgemann Racing	Chevrolet	1:20.513	88.979	-	-
23	17	Harrison Burton (i)	David Gilliland Racing	Ford	1:20.523	88.968	-	-
24	88	Matt Crafton	ThorSport Racing	Toyota	1:20.556	88.932	-	-
25	61	Chase Purdy	Hattori Racing Enterprises	Toyota	1:20.607	88.876	-	-
26	30	Josh Bilicki (i)	On Point Motorsports	Toyota	1:20.788	88.677	-	-
27	15	Tanner Gray	David Gilliland Racing	Ford	1:20.951	88.498	-	-
28	24	Jack Wood (R)	GMS Racing	Chevrolet	1:21.036	88.405	-	-
29	9	Blaine Perkins (R)	CR7 Motorsports	Chevrolet	1:21.080	88.357	-	-
30	44	Kris Wright	Niece Motorsports	Chevrolet	1:21.102	88.333	-	-
31	62	Todd Bodine	Halmar Friesen Racing	Toyota	1:21.106	88.329	-	-
Qualified by owner's points
32	43	Brad Perez	Reaume Brothers Racing	Toyota	1:22.033	87.331	-	-
33	40	Dean Thompson (R)	Niece Motorsports	Chevrolet	1:22.651	86.678	-	-
34	33	Jade Buford (i)	Reaume Brothers Racing	Toyota	1:23.537	85.758	-	-
35	46	Stefan Parsons (i)	G2G Racing	Toyota	1:24.067	85.218	-	-
36	12	Spencer Boyd	Young's Motorsports	Chevrolet	1:24.156	85.128	-	-
Withdrew
	22	Austin Wayne Self	AM Racing	Chevrolet	-	-	-	-
	47	Travis McCullough	G2G Racing	Toyota	-	-	-	-
Official qualifying results
Official starting lineup

== Race results ==
Stage 1 Laps: 20

Pos.	#	Driver	Team	Make	Pts
1	66	Ty Majeski	ThorSport Racing	Toyota	10
2	16	Tyler Ankrum	Hattori Racing Enterprises	Toyota	9
3	4	John Hunter Nemechek	Kyle Busch Motorsports	Toyota	8
4	23	Grant Enfinger	GMS Racing	Chevrolet	7
5	75	Parker Kligerman	Henderson Motorsports	Chevrolet	6
6	25	Matt DiBenedetto	Rackley W.A.R.	Chevrolet	5
7	19	Derek Kraus	McAnally–Hilgemann Racing	Chevrolet	4
8	38	Zane Smith	Front Row Motorsports	Ford	3
9	20	Austin Dillon (i)	Young's Motorsports	Chevrolet	0
10	1	Hailie Deegan	David Gilliland Racing	Ford	1

Stage 2 Laps: 25

Pos.	#	Driver	Team	Make	Pts
1	99	Ben Rhodes	ThorSport Racing	Toyota	10
2	18	Chandler Smith	Kyle Busch Motorsports	Toyota	9
3	61	Chase Purdy	Hattori Racing Enterprises	Toyota	8
4	02	Kaz Grala	Young's Motorsports	Chevrolet	7
5	42	Carson Hocevar (Note: In the first half of the race, Hocevar went through a driver change with Daniel Suárez. Since Hocevar started the race, his is officially credited with the 6th place finish.)	Niece Motorsports	Chevrolet	6
6	20	Austin Dillon (i)	Young's Motorsports	Chevrolet	0
7	56	Timmy Hill	Hill Motorsports	Toyota	4
8	40	Dean Thompson (R)	Niece Motorsports	Chevrolet	3
9	1	Hailie Deegan	David Gilliland Racing	Ford	2
10	62	Todd Bodine	Halmar Friesen Racing	Toyota	1

Stage 3 Laps: 30

Fin.	St	#	Driver	Team	Make	Laps	Led	Status	Pts
1	3	51	Kyle Busch (i)	Kyle Busch Motorsports	Toyota	75	45	Running	0
2	13	38	Zane Smith	Front Row Motorsports	Ford	75	0	Running	38
3	4	66	Ty Majeski	ThorSport Racing	Toyota	75	4	Running	44
4	2	41	Ross Chastain (i)	Niece Motorsports	Chevrolet	75	19	Running	0
5	14	18	Chandler Smith	Kyle Busch Motorsports	Toyota	75	0	Running	41
6	1	42	Carson Hocevar	Niece Motorsports	Chevrolet	75	0	Running	37
7	11	75	Parker Kligerman	Henderson Motorsports	Chevrolet	75	0	Running	36
8	7	4	John Hunter Nemechek	Kyle Busch Motorsports	Toyota	75	0	Running	37
9	5	16	Tyler Ankrum	Hattori Racing Enterprises	Toyota	75	0	Running	37
10	12	25	Matt DiBenedetto	Rackley W.A.R.	Chevrolet	75	0	Running	32
11	8	23	Grant Enfinger	GMS Racing	Chevrolet	75	1	Running	33
12	23	17	Harrison Burton (i)	David Gilliland Racing	Ford	75	0	Running	0
13	27	15	Tanner Gray	David Gilliland Racing	Ford	75	0	Running	24
14	20	02	Kaz Grala	Young's Motorsports	Chevrolet	75	0	Running	30
15	25	61	Chase Purdy	Hattori Racing Enterprises	Toyota	75	0	Running	30
16	28	24	Jack Wood (R)	GMS Racing	Chevrolet	75	0	Running	21
17	16	20	Austin Dillon (i)	Young's Motorsports	Chevrolet	75	0	Running	0
18	17	99	Ben Rhodes	ThorSport Racing	Toyota	75	6	Running	29
19	22	91	Colby Howard	McAnally–Hilgemann Racing	Chevrolet	75	0	Running	18
20	31	62	Todd Bodine	Halmar Friesen Racing	Toyota	75	0	Running	18
21	29	9	Blaine Perkins (R)	CR7 Motorsports	Chevrolet	75	0	Running	16
22	32	43	Brad Perez	Reaume Brothers Racing	Toyota	75	0	Running	15
23	36	12	Spencer Boyd	Young's Motorsports	Chevrolet	75	0	Running	14
24	33	40	Dean Thompson (R)	Niece Motorsports	Chevrolet	75	0	Running	16
25	19	45	Lawless Alan (R)	Niece Motorsports	Chevrolet	75	0	Running	12
26	30	44	Kris Wright	Niece Motorsports	Chevrolet	75	0	Running	11
27	15	19	Derek Kraus	McAnally–Hilgemann Racing	Chevrolet	74	0	Running	14
28	21	56	Timmy Hill	Hill Motorsports	Toyota	73	0	Running	13
29	6	7	Alex Bowman (i)	Spire Motorsports	Chevrolet	71	0	Accident	0
30	26	30	Josh Bilicki (i)	On Point Motorsports	Toyota	70	0	Accident	0
31	10	52	Stewart Friesen	Halmar Friesen Racing	Toyota	70	0	Accident	6
32	9	1	Hailie Deegan	David Gilliland Racing	Ford	66	0	Accident	8
33	34	33	Jade Buford (i)	Reaume Brothers Racing	Toyota	61	0	Transmission	0
34	24	88	Matt Crafton	ThorSport Racing	Toyota	54	0	Transmission	3
35	18	98	Christian Eckes	ThorSport Racing	Toyota	26	0	Accident	2
36	35	46	Stefan Parsons (i)	G2G Racing	Toyota	9	0	Oil Cooler	0
Official race results

== Standings after the race ==
Drivers' Championship standings

Pos	Driver	Points
1	Ben Rhodes	444
2	Chandler Smith	439 (-5)
3	Zane Smith	432 (-12)
4	John Hunter Nemechek	430 (-14)
5	Ty Majeski	399 (-45)
6	Stewart Friesen	397 (-47)
7	Christian Eckes	383 (-61)
8	Carson Hocevar	374 (-70)
9	Grant Enfinger	344 (-100)
10	Matt Crafton	320 (-124)
Official driver's standings

- Note: Only the first 10 positions are included for the driver standings.

Previous race: 2022 Toyota 200	NASCAR Camping World Truck Series; 2022 season	Next race: 2022 Clean Harbors 150
