= 2023 Road America 180 =

20th race of the 2023 NASCAR Xfinity Series

Race details
- Race 20 of 33 of the 2023 NASCAR Xfinity Series
- Date: July 29, 2023
- Official name: 14th Annual Road America 180
- Location: Road America, Elkhart Lake, Wisconsin
- Course: Permanent racing facility
- Course length: 4.048 miles (6.515 km)
- Distance: 49 laps, 198 mi (318 km)
- Scheduled distance: 45 laps, 182 mi (293 km)
- Average speed: 65.265 mph (105.034 km/h)

Pole position
Driver	A. J. Allmendinger	Kaulig Racing
- Time: 2:10.574

Most laps led
Driver	Justin Allgaier	JR Motorsports
- Laps: 42

Winner
No. 1	Sam Mayer	JR Motorsports

Television in the United States
- Network: NBC
- Announcers: Dave Burns (play-by-play), Jeff Burton and Dale Jarrett (color commentators), Kevin Lee and Matt Yocum (pit reporters)

Radio in the United States
- Radio: MRN

The 2023 Road America 180 was the 20th stock car race of the 2023 NASCAR Xfinity Series, and the 14th iteration of the event. The race was held on Saturday, July 29, 2023, in Elkhart Lake, Wisconsin at Road America, a 4.048 miles (6.515 km) permanent road course. The race was originally scheduled to be contested over 45 laps, but was extended to 49 laps due to a NASCAR overtime finish. In an incredible overtime finish that saw the leaders make numerous mistakes, Sam Mayer, driving for JR Motorsports, would take advantage of those mistakes, and held off Parker Kligerman on the final lap to earn his first career NASCAR Xfinity Series win. Justin Allgaier would dominate the entire race, winning both stages and leading a race-high 42 laps, before he spun in turn 8 with two laps to go. To fill out the podium, Kligerman, driving for Big Machine Racing, and Austin Hill, driving for Richard Childress Racing, would finish 2nd and 3rd, respectively.

== Background ==
Road America is a motorsport road course located near Elkhart Lake, Wisconsin on Wisconsin Highway 67. It has hosted races since the 1950s and currently hosts races in the NASCAR Xfinity Series, IndyCar Series, IMSA SportsCar Championship, Sports Car Club of America GT World Challenge America and Trans-Am Series and the MotoAmerica Superbike Championship.

=== Entry list ===
- (R) denotes rookie driver.
- (i) denotes driver who is ineligible for series driver points.

#	Driver	Team	Make
00	Cole Custer	Stewart-Haas Racing	Ford
1	Sam Mayer	JR Motorsports	Chevrolet
02	Blaine Perkins (R)	Our Motorsports	Chevrolet
2	Sheldon Creed	Richard Childress Racing	Chevrolet
4	Kyle Weatherman	JD Motorsports	Chevrolet
6	Brennan Poole	JD Motorsports	Chevrolet
07	Katherine Legge	SS-Green Light Racing	Chevrolet
7	Justin Allgaier	JR Motorsports	Chevrolet
08	Alex Labbé	SS-Green Light Racing	Ford
8	Josh Berry	JR Motorsports	Chevrolet
9	Brandon Jones	JR Motorsports	Chevrolet
10	A. J. Allmendinger (i)	Kaulig Racing	Chevrolet
11	Daniel Hemric	Kaulig Racing	Chevrolet
16	Chandler Smith (R)	Kaulig Racing	Chevrolet
18	Sammy Smith (R)	Joe Gibbs Racing	Toyota
19	Connor Mosack (R)	Joe Gibbs Racing	Toyota
20	John Hunter Nemechek	Joe Gibbs Racing	Toyota
21	Austin Hill	Richard Childress Racing	Chevrolet
24	Sage Karam	Sam Hunt Racing	Toyota
25	Brett Moffitt	AM Racing	Ford
26	Kaz Grala	Sam Hunt Racing	Toyota
27	Jeb Burton	Jordan Anderson Racing	Chevrolet
28	Kyle Sieg	RSS Racing	Ford
31	Parker Retzlaff (R)	Jordan Anderson Racing	Chevrolet
35	Stanton Barrett	Emerling-Gase Motorsports	Toyota
38	Joe Graf Jr.	RSS Racing	Ford
39	Ryan Sieg	RSS Racing	Ford
43	Ryan Ellis	Alpha Prime Racing	Chevrolet
44	Brad Perez	Alpha Prime Racing	Chevrolet
45	Leland Honeyman	Alpha Prime Racing	Chevrolet
48	Parker Kligerman	Big Machine Racing	Chevrolet
51	Jeremy Clements	Jeremy Clements Racing	Chevrolet
53	Patrick Emerling	Emerling-Gase Motorsports	Chevrolet
66	Dexter Stacey	MBM Motorsports	Toyota
78	Anthony Alfredo	B. J. McLeod Motorsports	Chevrolet
91	Josh Bilicki	DGM Racing	Chevrolet
92	Josh Williams	DGM Racing	Chevrolet
98	Riley Herbst	Stewart-Haas Racing	Ford
Official entry list

== Practice ==
The first and only practice session was held on Friday, July 28, at 4:00 PM CST, and would last for 50 minutes. Justin Allgaier, driving for JR Motorsports, would set the fastest time in the session, with a lap of 1:12.360, and an average speed of 110.100 mph (177.189 km/h).

Pos.	#	Driver	Team	Make	Time	Speed
1	7	Justin Allgaier	JR Motorsports	Chevrolet	2:12.360	110.100
2	98	Riley Herbst	Stewart-Haas Racing	Ford	2:13.276	109.343
3	10	A. J. Allmendinger (i)	Kaulig Racing	Chevrolet	2:13.385	109.254
Full practice results

== Qualifying ==
Qualifying was held on Friday, July 28, at 5:00 PM CST. Since Road America is a road course, the qualifying system is a two group system, with two rounds. Drivers will be separated into two groups, Group A and Group B. Each driver will have multiple laps to set a time. The fastest 5 drivers from each group will advance to the final round. The fastest driver to set a time in that round will win the pole. A. J. Allmendinger, driving for Kaulig Racing, would score the pole for the race, with a lap of 1:10.574, and an average speed of 111.606 mph (179.612 km/h).

Pos.	#	Driver	Team	Make	Time (R1)	Speed (R1)	Time (R2)	Speed (R2)
1	10	A. J. Allmendinger (i)	Kaulig Racing	Chevrolet	2:11.898	110.485	2:10.574	111.606
2	00	Cole Custer	Stewart-Haas Racing	Ford	2:11.574	110.757	2:10.872	111.352
3	7	Justin Allgaier	JR Motorsports	Chevrolet	2:10.768	111.440	2:11.093	111.164
4	98	Riley Herbst	Stewart-Haas Racing	Ford	2:12.179	110.250	2:11.764	110.598
5	1	Sam Mayer	JR Motorsports	Chevrolet	2:11.616	110.722	2:11.909	110.476
6	24	Sage Karam	Sam Hunt Racing	Toyota	2:12.261	110.182	1:12.189	110.242
7	19	Connor Mosack (R)	Joe Gibbs Racing	Toyota	2:11.848	110.527	2:12.410	110.058
8	20	John Hunter Nemechek	Joe Gibbs Racing	Toyota	2:12.143	110.281	2:12.652	109.857
9	26	Kaz Grala	Sam Hunt Racing	Toyota	2:12.230	110.208	2:13.439	109.209
10	18	Sammy Smith (R)	Joe Gibbs Racing	Toyota	2:12.483	109.998	2:23.142	101.807
Eliminated from Round 1
11	91	Josh Bilicki	DGM Racing	Chevrolet	2:12.577	109.920	—	—
12	2	Sheldon Creed	Richard Childress Racing	Chevrolet	2:13.043	109.535	—	—
13	8	Josh Berry	JR Motorsports	Chevrolet	2:13.146	109.450	—	—
14	21	Austin Hill	Richard Childress Racing	Chevrolet	2:13.288	109.333	—	—
15	25	Brett Moffitt	AM Racing	Ford	2:13.309	109.316	—	—
16	16	Chandler Smith (R)	Kaulig Racing	Chevrolet	2:13.363	109.272	—	—
17	48	Parker Kligerman	Big Machine Racing	Chevrolet	2:13.513	109.149	—	—
18	92	Josh Williams	DGM Racing	Chevrolet	2:13.580	109.094	—	—
19	27	Jeb Burton	Jordan Anderson Racing	Chevrolet	2:14.417	108.415	—	—
20	31	Parker Retzlaff (R)	Jordan Anderson Racing	Chevrolet	2:14.466	108.375	—	—
21	44	Brad Perez	Alpha Prime Racing	Chevrolet	2:14.577	108.286	—	—
22	45	Leland Honeyman	Alpha Prime Racing	Chevrolet	2:15.210	107.779	—	—
23	78	Anthony Alfredo	B. J. McLeod Motorsports	Chevrolet	2:15.532	107.523	—	—
24	07	Katherine Legge	SS-Green Light Racing	Chevrolet	2:15.673	107.411	—	—
25	02	Blaine Perkins (R)	Our Motorsports	Chevrolet	2:16.132	107.049	—	—
26	6	Brennan Poole	JD Motorsports	Chevrolet	2:16.203	106.993	—	—
27	28	Kyle Sieg	RSS Racing	Ford	2:16.423	106.821	—	—
28	35	Stanton Barrett	Emerling-Gase Motorsports	Toyota	2:17.612	105.898	—	—
29	53	Patrick Emerling	Emerling-Gase Motorsports	Chevrolet	2:19.411	104.531	—	—
30	66	Dexter Stacey	MBM Motorsports	Toyota	2:19.912	104.157	—	—
31	51	Jeremy Clements	Jeremy Clements Racing	Chevrolet	2:34.273	94.461	—	—
32	11	Daniel Hemric	Kaulig Racing	Chevrolet	—	—	—	—
33	9	Brandon Jones	JR Motorsports	Chevrolet	—	—	—	—
Qualified by owner's points
34	39	Ryan Sieg	RSS Racing	Ford	—	—	—	—
35	38	Joe Graf Jr.	RSS Racing	Ford	—	—	—	—
36	43	Ryan Ellis	Alpha Prime Racing	Chevrolet	—	—	—	—
37	08	Alex Labbé	SS-Green Light Racing	Ford	—	—	—	—
38	4	Kyle Weatherman	JD Motorsports	Chevrolet	—	—	—	—
Official qualifying results
Official starting lineup

== Race results ==
Stage 1 Laps: 22

Pos.	#	Driver	Team	Make	Pts
1	7	Justin Allgaier	JR Motorsports	Chevrolet	10
2	00	Cole Custer	Stewart-Haas Racing	Ford	9
3	10	A. J. Allmendinger (i)	Kaulig Racing	Chevrolet	0
4	20	John Hunter Nemechek	Joe Gibbs Racing	Toyota	7
5	24	Sage Karam	Sam Hunt Racing	Toyota	6
6	98	Riley Herbst	Stewart-Haas Racing	Ford	5
7	26	Kaz Grala	Sam Hunt Racing	Toyota	4
8	21	Austin Hill	Richard Childress Racing	Chevrolet	3
9	1	Sam Mayer	JR Motorsports	Chevrolet	2
10	18	Sammy Smith (R)	Joe Gibbs Racing	Toyota	1

Stage 2 Laps: 12

Pos.	#	Driver	Team	Make	Pts
1	7	Justin Allgaier	JR Motorsports	Chevrolet	10
2	00	Cole Custer	Stewart-Haas Racing	Ford	9
3	24	Sage Karam	Sam Hunt Racing	Toyota	8
4	10	A. J. Allmendinger (i)	Kaulig Racing	Chevrolet	0
5	1	Sam Mayer	JR Motorsports	Chevrolet	6
6	26	Kaz Grala	Sam Hunt Racing	Toyota	5
7	8	Josh Berry	JR Motorsports	Chevrolet	4
8	48	Parker Kligerman	Big Machine Racing	Chevrolet	3
9	18	Sammy Smith (R)	Joe Gibbs Racing	Toyota	2
10	91	Josh Bilicki	DGM Racing	Chevrolet	1

Stage 3 Laps: 15

Pos.	St	#	Driver	Team	Make	Laps	Led	Status	Pts
1	5	1	Sam Mayer	JR Motorsports	Chevrolet	49	2	Running	48
2	17	48	Parker Kligerman	Big Machine Racing	Chevrolet	49	0	Running	38
3	14	21	Austin Hill	Richard Childress Racing	Chevrolet	49	0	Running	37
4	6	24	Sage Karam	Sam Hunt Racing	Toyota	49	0	Running	47
5	4	98	Riley Herbst	Stewart-Haas Racing	Ford	49	0	Running	37
6	13	8	Josh Berry	JR Motorsports	Chevrolet	49	0	Running	35
7	9	26	Kaz Grala	Sam Hunt Racing	Toyota	49	0	Running	39
8	11	91	Josh Bilicki	DGM Racing	Chevrolet	49	0	Running	30
9	1	10	A. J. Allmendinger (i)	Kaulig Racing	Chevrolet	49	5	Running	0
10	33	9	Brandon Jones	JR Motorsports	Chevrolet	49	0	Running	27
11	32	11	Daniel Hemric	Kaulig Racing	Chevrolet	49	0	Running	26
12	19	27	Jeb Burton	Jordan Anderson Racing	Chevrolet	49	0	Running	25
13	34	39	Ryan Sieg	RSS Racing	Ford	49	0	Running	24
14	20	31	Parker Retzlaff (R)	Jordan Anderson Racing	Chevrolet	49	0	Running	23
15	26	6	Brennan Poole	JD Motorsports	Chevrolet	49	0	Running	22
16	23	78	Anthony Alfredo	B. J. McLeod Motorsports	Chevrolet	49	0	Running	21
17	25	02	Blaine Perkins (R)	Our Motorsports	Chevrolet	49	0	Running	20
18	3	7	Justin Allgaier	JR Motorsports	Chevrolet	49	42	Running	39
19	21	44	Brad Perez	Alpha Prime Racing	Chevrolet	49	0	Running	18
20	38	4	Kyle Weatherman	JD Motorsports	Chevrolet	49	0	Running	17
21	18	92	Josh Williams	DGM Racing	Chevrolet	49	0	Running	16
22	29	53	Patrick Emerling	Emerling-Gase Motorsports	Chevrolet	49	0	Running	15
23	35	38	Joe Graf Jr.	RSS Racing	Ford	49	0	Running	14
24	28	35	Stanton Barrett	Emerling-Gase Motorsports	Toyota	49	0	Running	13
25	30	66	Dexter Stacey	MBM Motorsports	Toyota	49	0	Running	12
26	12	2	Sheldon Creed	Richard Childress Racing	Chevrolet	49	0	Running	11
27	31	51	Jeremy Clements	Jeremy Clements Racing	Chevrolet	49	0	Running	10
28	22	45	Leland Honeyman	Alpha Prime Racing	Chevrolet	45	0	Transmission	9
29	7	19	Connor Mosack (R)	Joe Gibbs Racing	Toyota	44	0	Rear Gear	8
30	2	00	Cole Custer	Stewart-Haas Racing	Ford	41	0	Accident	25
31	10	18	Sammy Smith (R)	Joe Gibbs Racing	Toyota	41	0	Accident	9
32	27	28	Kyle Sieg	RSS Racing	Ford	39	0	Brakes	5
33	37	08	Alex Labbé	SS-Green Light Racing	Ford	38	0	Accident	4
34	8	20	John Hunter Nemechek	Joe Gibbs Racing	Toyota	31	0	Accident	10
35	36	43	Ryan Ellis	Alpha Prime Racing	Chevrolet	25	0	Accident	2
36	15	25	Brett Moffitt	AM Racing	Ford	23	0	Hub	1
37	16	16	Chandler Smith (R)	Kaulig Racing	Chevrolet	20	0	Accident	1
38	24	07	Katherine Legge	SS-Green Light Racing	Chevrolet	9	0	Mechanical	1
Official race results

== Standings after the race ==
Drivers' Championship standings

	Pos	Driver	Points
1	1	Austin Hill	775
1	2	John Hunter Nemechek	761 (-14)
	3	Justin Allgaier	735 (–40)
	4	Cole Custer	691 (–84)
1	5	Josh Berry	612 (–163)
3	6	Sam Mayer	593 (–182)
2	7	Chandler Smith	588 (–187)
1	8	Daniel Hemric	579 (–196)
1	9	Sammy Smith	557 (–218)
1	10	Riley Herbst	530 (–245)
1	11	Sheldon Creed	527 (–248)
	12	Parker Kligerman	505 (–270)
Official driver's standings

- Note: Only the first 12 positions are included for the driver standings.

Previous race: 2023 Explore the Pocono Mountains 225	NASCAR Xfinity Series; 2023 season	Next race: 2023 Cabo Wabo 250
