= 2022 Pennzoil 150 =

20th race of the 2022 NASCAR Xfinity Series

2022 Pennzoil 150 at the Brickyard
Race details
- Race 20 of 33 of the 2022 NASCAR Xfinity Series
- Date: July 30, 2022
- Location: Indianapolis Motor Speedway, Speedway, Indiana
- Course: Permanent racing facility
- Course length: 2.439 miles (3.925 km)
- Distance: 62 laps, 151.218 mi (243.362 km)
- Scheduled distance: 62 laps, 151.218 mi (243.362 km)
- Average speed: 77.825 mph (125.247 km/h)

Pole position
Driver	A. J. Allmendinger	Kaulig Racing
- Time: 1:29.748

Most laps led
Driver	A. J. Allmendinger	Kaulig Racing
- Laps: 42

Winner
No. 16	A. J. Allmendinger	Kaulig Racing

Television in the United States
- Network: NBC
- Announcers: Rick Allen, Jeff Burton, Steve Letarte and James Hinchcliffe

Radio in the United States
- Radio: IMS Radio Network

The 2022 Pennzoil 150 was the 20th stock car race of the 2022 NASCAR Xfinity Series, and the eleventh iteration of the event. The race was held on Saturday, July 30, 2022, in Speedway, Indiana at the Indianapolis Motor Speedway road course, a 2.439 miles (3.925 km) permanent road course built inside the speedway. The race took the scheduled 62 laps to complete. A. J. Allmendinger, driving for Kaulig Racing, dominated the majority of the race, leading 42 laps, and earning his 14th career NASCAR Xfinity Series win, along with his third of the season. To fill out the podium, Alex Bowman, driving for Hendrick Motorsports, and Justin Allgaier, driving for JR Motorsports, would finish 2nd and 3rd, respectively.

== Background ==
The Indianapolis Motor Speedway, located in Speedway, Indiana, (an enclave suburb of Indianapolis) in the United States, is the home of the Indianapolis 500 and the Brickyard 400. It is located on the corner of 16th Street and Georgetown Road, approximately six miles (10 km) west of Downtown Indianapolis.

Constructed in 1909, it is the original speedway, the first racing facility so named. It has a permanent seating capacity estimated at 235,000 with infield seating raising capacity to an approximate 400,000. It is the highest-capacity sports venue in the world.

In addition to the Indianapolis 500, the speedway also hosts NASCAR's Verizon 200 and Pennzoil 150. From 2000 to 2007, the speedway hosted the Formula One United States Grand Prix, and from 2008 to 2015 the Moto GP.

=== Entry list ===
#	Driver	Team	Make
1	Sam Mayer	JR Motorsports	Chevrolet
02	Brett Moffitt	Our Motorsports	Chevrolet
2	Sheldon Creed (R)	Richard Childress Racing	Chevrolet
4	Bayley Currey	JD Motorsports	Chevrolet
5	Scott Heckert	B. J. McLeod Motorsports	Chevrolet
6	Ty Dillon (i)	JD Motorsports	Chevrolet
07	Chase Briscoe (i)	SS-Green Light Racing	Ford
7	Justin Allgaier	JR Motorsports	Chevrolet
08	Andy Lally	SS-Green Light Racing	Ford
8	Josh Berry	JR Motorsports	Chevrolet
9	Noah Gragson	JR Motorsports	Chevrolet
10	Landon Cassill	Kaulig Racing	Chevrolet
11	Daniel Hemric	Kaulig Racing	Chevrolet
13	Brad Perez (i)	MBM Motorsports	Toyota
16	A. J. Allmendinger	Kaulig Racing	Chevrolet
17	Alex Bowman (i)	Hendrick Motorsports	Chevrolet
18	Bubba Wallace (i)	Joe Gibbs Racing	Toyota
19	Brandon Jones	Joe Gibbs Racing	Toyota
21	Austin Hill (R)	Richard Childress Racing	Chevrolet
23	Anthony Alfredo	Our Motorsports	Chevrolet
26	Santino Ferrucci	Sam Hunt Racing	Toyota
27	Jeb Burton	Our Motorsports	Chevrolet
31	Myatt Snider	Jordan Anderson Racing	Chevrolet
34	Kyle Weatherman	Jesse Iwuji Motorsports	Chevrolet
35	Parker Kligerman (i)	Emerling-Gase Motorsports	Ford
36	Alex Labbé	DGM Racing	Chevrolet
38	Patrick Gallagher	RSS Racing	Ford
39	Ryan Sieg	RSS Racing	Ford
44	Ryan Ellis	Alpha Prime Racing	Chevrolet
45	Sage Karam	Alpha Prime Racing	Chevrolet
47	Brandon Brown	Mike Harmon Racing	Chevrolet
48	Kaz Grala (i)	Big Machine Racing	Chevrolet
51	Jeremy Clements	Jeremy Clements Racing	Chevrolet
54	Ty Gibbs	Joe Gibbs Racing	Toyota
66	J. J. Yeley	MBM Motorsports	Ford
68	Austin Dillon (i)	Brandonbilt Motorsports	Chevrolet
78	Josh Williams	B. J. McLeod Motorsports	Chevrolet
88	Miguel Paludo	JR Motorsports	Chevrolet
90	Mason Filippi	DGM Racing	Chevrolet
91	Preston Pardus	DGM Racing	Chevrolet
92	Ross Chastain (i)	DGM Racing	Chevrolet
98	Riley Herbst	Stewart-Haas Racing	Ford
Official entry list

== Practice ==
The only 30-minute practice session was held on Friday, July 29, at 3:30 PM EST. A. J. Allmendinger, driving for Kaulig Racing, was the fastest in the session, with a lap of 1:31.680, and an average speed of 95.772 mph (154.130 km/h).

Pos.	#	Driver	Team	Make	Time	Speed
1	16	A. J. Allmendinger	Kaulig Racing	Chevrolet	1:31.680	95.772
2	21	Austin Hill (R)	Richard Childress Racing	Chevrolet	1:31.918	95.524
3	36	Alex Labbé	DGM Racing	Chevrolet	1:31.954	95.487
Full practice results

== Qualifying ==
Qualifying was held on Friday, July 29, at 4:00 PM EST. Since the road course version of Indianapolis Motor Speedway is a road course, the qualifying system used is a two group system, with two rounds. Drivers will be separated into two groups, Group A and Group B. Each driver will have a lap to set a time. The fastest 5 drivers from each group will advance to the final round. Drivers will also have one lap to set a time. The fastest driver to set a time in the round will win the pole. A. J. Allmendinger, driving for Kaulig Racing, scored the pole for the race, with a lap of 1:29.748, and an average speed of 97.834 mph (157.449 km/h).

Pos.	#	Driver	Team	Make	Time (R1)	Speed (R1)	Time (R2)	Speed (R2)
1	16	A. J. Allmendinger	Kaulig Racing	Chevrolet	1:29.860	97.712	1:29.748	97.834
2	54	Ty Gibbs	Joe Gibbs Racing	Toyota	1:30.299	97.237	1:29.842	97.732
3	98	Riley Herbst	Stewart-Haas Racing	Ford	1:30.345	97.187	1:30.076	97.478
4	17	Alex Bowman (i)	Hendrick Motorsports	Chevrolet	1:30.294	97.242	1:30.210	97.333
5	1	Sam Mayer	JR Motorsports	Chevrolet	1:30.119	97.431	1:30.407	97.121
6	07	Chase Briscoe (i)	SS-Green Light Racing	Ford	1:30.355	97.177	1:30.614	96.899
7	9	Noah Gragson	JR Motorsports	Chevrolet	1:30.747	96.757	1:30.865	96.631
8	8	Josh Berry	JR Motorsports	Chevrolet	1:30.682	96.826	1:31.022	96.465
9	21	Austin Hill (R)	Richard Childress Racing	Chevrolet	1:30.837	96.661	1:31.187	96.290
10	7	Justin Allgaier	JR Motorsports	Chevrolet	1:30.842	96.656	1:31.321	96.149
Eliminated from Round 1
11	10	Landon Cassill	Kaulig Racing	Chevrolet	1:30.884	96.611	-	-
12	45	Sage Karam	Alpha Prime Racing	Chevrolet	1:30.899	96.595	-	-
13	18	Bubba Wallace (i)	Joe Gibbs Racing	Toyota	1:30.903	96.591	-	-
14	36	Alex Labbé	DGM Racing	Chevrolet	1:30.939	96.553	-	-
15	2	Sheldon Creed (R)	Richard Childress Racing	Chevrolet	1:31.205	96.271	-	-
16	11	Daniel Hemric	Kaulig Racing	Chevrolet	1:31.241	96.233	-	-
17	02	Brett Moffitt	Our Motorsports	Chevrolet	1:31.328	96.141	-	-
18	92	Ross Chastain (i)	DGM Racing	Chevrolet	1:31.381	96.086	-	-
19	88	Miguel Paludo	JR Motorsports	Chevrolet	1:31.480	95.982	-	-
20	68	Austin Dillon (i)	Brandonbilt Motorsports	Chevrolet	1:31.516	95.944	-	-
21	27	Jeb Burton	Our Motorsports	Chevrolet	1:31.689	95.763	-	-
22	08	Andy Lally	SS-Green Light Racing	Ford	1:31.837	95.609	-	-
23	91	Preston Pardus	DGM Racing	Chevrolet	1:31.885	95.559	-	-
24	48	Kaz Grala (i)	Big Machine Racing	Chevrolet	1:31.970	95.470	-	-
25	31	Myatt Snider	Jordan Anderson Racing	Chevrolet	1:32.086	95.350	-	-
26	23	Anthony Alfredo	Our Motorsports	Chevrolet	1:32.123	95.312	-	-
27	6	Ty Dillon (i)	JD Motorsports	Chevrolet	1:32.163	95.270	-	-
28	34	Kyle Weatherman	Jesse Iwuji Motorsports	Chevrolet	1:32.273	95.157	-	-
29	51	Jeremy Clements	Jeremy Clements Racing	Chevrolet	1:32.280	95.150	-	-
30	26	Santino Ferrucci	Sam Hunt Racing	Toyota	1:32.546	94.876	-	-
31	39	Ryan Sieg	RSS Racing	Ford	1:32.570	94.851	-	-
32	5	Scott Heckert	B. J. McLeod Motorsports	Chevrolet	1:32.587	94.834	-	-
33	44	Ryan Ellis	Alpha Prime Racing	Chevrolet	1:32.613	94.807	-	-
Qualified by owner's points
34	4	Bayley Currey	JD Motorsports	Chevrolet	1:33.032	94.380	-	-
35	38	Patrick Gallagher	RSS Racing	Ford	1:33.315	94.094	-	-
36	19	Brandon Jones	Joe Gibbs Racing	Toyota	1:34.393	93.020	-	-
37	35	Parker Kligerman (i)	Emerling-Gase Motorsports	Toyota	-	-	-	-
Past-winner provisional
38	47	Brandon Brown	Mike Harmon Racing	Chevrolet	1:34.505	92.909	-	-
Failed to qualify
39	78	Josh Williams	B. J. McLeod Motorsports	Chevrolet	1:32.677	94.742	-	-
40	13	Brad Perez (i)	MBM Motorsports	Toyota	1:32.997	94.416	-	-
41	66	J. J. Yeley	MBM Motorsports	Toyota	1:33.840	93.568	-	-
42	90	Mason Filippi	DGM Racing	Chevrolet	-	-	-	-
Official qualifying results
Official starting lineup

== Race results ==
Stage 1 Laps: 20

Pos.	#	Driver	Team	Make	Pts
1	9	Noah Gragson	JR Motorsports	Chevrolet	10
2	31	Myatt Snider	Jordan Anderson Racing	Chevrolet	9
3	17	Alex Bowman (i)	Hendrick Motorsports	Chevrolet	0
4	7	Justin Allgaier	JR Motorsports	Chevrolet	7
5	98	Riley Herbst	Stewart-Haas Racing	Ford	6
6	54	Ty Gibbs	Joe Gibbs Racing	Toyota	5
7	8	Josh Berry	JR Motorsports	Chevrolet	4
8	2	Sheldon Creed (R)	Richard Childress Racing	Chevrolet	3
9	16	A. J. Allmendinger	Kaulig Racing	Chevrolet	2
10	1	Sam Mayer	JR Motorsports	Chevrolet	1

Stage 2 Laps: 20

Pos.	#	Driver	Team	Make	Pts
1	8	Josh Berry	JR Motorsports	Chevrolet	10
2	36	Alex Labbé	DGM Racing	Chevrolet	9
3	48	Kaz Grala (i)	Big Machine Racing	Chevrolet	0
4	45	Sage Karam	Alpha Prime Racing	Chevrolet	7
5	91	Preston Pardus	DGM Racing	Chevrolet	6
6	6	Ty Dillon (i)	JD Motorsports	Chevrolet	0
7	4	Bayley Currey	JD Motorsports	Chevrolet	4
8	23	Anthony Alfredo	Our Motorsports	Chevrolet	3
9	34	Kyle Weatherman	Jesse Iwuji Motorsports	Chevrolet	2
10	38	Patrick Gallagher	RSS Racing	Ford	1

Stage 3 Laps: 22

Fin.	St	#	Driver	Team	Make	Laps	Led	Status	Pts
1	1	16	A. J. Allmendinger	Kaulig Racing	Chevrolet	62	42	Running	42
2	4	17	Alex Bowman (i)	Hendrick Motorsports	Chevrolet	62	4	Running	0
3	10	7	Justin Allgaier	JR Motorsports	Chevrolet	62	4	Running	41
4	18	92	Ross Chastain (i)	DGM Racing	Chevrolet	62	0	Running	0
5	6	07	Chase Briscoe (i)	SS-Green Light Racing	Ford	62	0	Running	0
6	3	98	Riley Herbst	Stewart-Haas Racing	Ford	62	0	Running	37
7	5	1	Sam Mayer	JR Motorsports	Chevrolet	62	0	Running	31
8	2	54	Ty Gibbs	Joe Gibbs Racing	Toyota	62	1	Running	34
9	9	21	Austin Hill (R)	Richard Childress Racing	Chevrolet	62	0	Running	28
10	7	9	Noah Gragson	JR Motorsports	Chevrolet	62	6	Running	37
11	11	10	Landon Cassill	Kaulig Racing	Chevrolet	62	0	Running	26
12	14	36	Alex Labbé	DGM Racing	Chevrolet	62	0	Running	34
13	12	45	Sage Karam	Alpha Prime Racing	Chevrolet	62	0	Running	31
14	8	8	Josh Berry	JR Motorsports	Chevrolet	62	5	Running	37
15	36	19	Brandon Jones	Joe Gibbs Racing	Toyota	62	0	Running	22
16	17	02	Brett Moffitt	Our Motorsports	Chevrolet	62	0	Running	21
17	30	26	Santino Ferrucci	Sam Hunt Racing	Toyota	62	0	Running	20
18	26	23	Anthony Alfredo	Our Motorsports	Chevrolet	62	0	Running	22
19	29	51	Jeremy Clements	Jeremy Clements Racing	Chevrolet	62	0	Running	18
20	27	6	Ty Dillon (i)	JD Motorsports	Chevrolet	62	0	Running	0
21	34	4	Bayley Currey	JD Motorsports	Chevrolet	62	0	Running	20
22	16	11	Daniel Hemric	Kaulig Racing	Chevrolet	62	0	Running	15
23	15	2	Sheldon Creed (R)	Richard Childress Racing	Chevrolet	62	0	Running	17
24	19	88	Miguel Paludo	JR Motorsports	Chevrolet	62	0	Running	13
25	22	08	Andy Lally	SS-Green Light Racing	Ford	62	0	Running	12
26	20	68	Austin Dillon (i)	Brandonbilt Motorsports	Chevrolet	62	0	Running	0
27	31	39	Ryan Sieg	RSS Racing	Ford	62	0	Running	10
28	35	38	Patrick Gallagher	RSS Racing	Ford	62	0	Running	10
29	23	91	Preston Pardus	DGM Racing	Chevrolet	62	0	Running	14
30	28	34	Kyle Weatherman	Jesse Iwuji Motorsports	Chevrolet	62	0	Running	9
31	32	5	Scott Heckert	B. J. McLeod Motorsports	Chevrolet	62	0	Running	6
32	24	48	Kaz Grala (i)	Big Machine Racing	Chevrolet	61	0	Running	0
33	25	31	Myatt Snider	Jordan Anderson Racing	Chevrolet	61	0	Running	13
34	38	47	Brandon Brown	Mike Harmon Racing	Chevrolet	58	0	Suspension	3
35	13	18	Bubba Wallace (i)	Joe Gibbs Racing	Toyota	28	0	Engine	0
36	33	44	Ryan Ellis	Alpha Prime Racing	Chevrolet	17	0	Accident	1
37	37	35	Parker Kligerman (i)	Emerling-Gase Motorsports	Toyota	11	0	Accident	0
38	21	27	Jeb Burton	Our Motorsports	Chevrolet	0	0	Track Bar	1
Official race results

== Standings after the race ==
Drivers' Championship standings

	Pos	Driver	Points
	1	A. J. Allmendinger	789
	2	Justin Allgaier	772 (-17)
	3	Ty Gibbs	759 (-30)
	4	Josh Berry	697 (-92)
	5	Noah Gragson	694 (-95)
	6	Austin Hill	628 (-161)
	7	Brandon Jones	596 (-193)
	8	Sam Mayer	574 (-215)
	9	Riley Herbst	555 (-234)
	10	Daniel Hemric	512 (-277)
1	11	Landon Cassill	477 (-312)
1	12	Ryan Sieg	471 (-318)
Official driver's standings

- Note: Only the first 12 positions are included for the driver standings.

Previous race: 2022 Explore the Pocono Mountains 225	NASCAR Xfinity Series; 2022 season	Next race: 2022 New Holland 250
