= 2023 Alsco Uniforms 302 =

30th race of the 2023 NASCAR Xfinity Series

Race details
- Race 30 of 33 of the 2023 NASCAR Xfinity Series
- Date: October 14, 2023
- Official name: 6th Annual Alsco Uniforms 302
- Location: Las Vegas Motor Speedway, Las Vegas, Nevada
- Course: Permanent racing facility
- Course length: 1.5 miles (2.4 km)
- Distance: 201 laps, 301 mi (485 km)
- Scheduled distance: 201 laps, 301 mi (485 km)
- Average speed: 130.598 mph (210.177 km/h)

Pole position
Driver	Josh Berry	JR Motorsports
- Time: 29.671

Most laps led
Driver	Riley Herbst	Stewart-Haas Racing
- Laps: 103

Winner
No. 98	Riley Herbst	Stewart-Haas Racing

Television in the United States
- Network: USA
- Announcers: Rick Allen, Jeff Burton, Steve Letarte, and Dale Earnhardt Jr.

Radio in the United States
- Radio: PRN

The 2023 Alsco Uniforms 302 was the 30th stock car race of the 2023 NASCAR Xfinity Series, the first race of the Round of 8, and the 6th iteration of the event. The race was held on Saturday, October 14, 2023, in Las Vegas, Nevada at Las Vegas Motor Speedway, a 1.5 miles (2.4 km) permanent quad-oval shaped racetrack. The race took the scheduled 201 laps to complete. Riley Herbst, driving for Stewart-Haas Racing, would take the surprise win after putting on a blistering performance, winning the second stage and leading a race-high 103 laps, managing a 15 second lead over John Hunter Nemechek to earn his first career NASCAR Xfinity Series win in his 139th start. He would also be the first non-playoff driver to win a race this season. Stewart-Haas Racing would dominate over half of the race, with Herbst leading 103 laps and Cole Custer winning the first stage and leading 62 laps. To fill out the podium, Nemechek, driving Joe Gibbs Racing, and Custer, driving for SHR, would finish 2nd and 3rd, respectively.

== Background ==
Las Vegas Motor Speedway, located in Clark County, Nevada outside the Las Vegas city limits and about 15 miles northeast of the Las Vegas Strip, is a 1,200-acre (490 ha) complex of multiple tracks for motorsports racing. The complex is owned by Speedway Motorsports, Inc., which is headquartered in Charlotte, North Carolina.

=== Entry list ===
- (R) denotes rookie driver.
- (i) denotes driver who is ineligible for series driver points.
- (P) denotes playoff driver.

#	Driver	Team	Make
00	Cole Custer (P)	Stewart-Haas Racing	Ford
1	Sam Mayer (P)	JR Motorsports	Chevrolet
02	Blaine Perkins (R)	Our Motorsports	Chevrolet
2	Sheldon Creed (P)	Richard Childress Racing	Chevrolet
4	Garrett Smithley	JD Motorsports	Chevrolet
6	Brennan Poole	JD Motorsports	Chevrolet
07	Gray Gaulding	SS-Green Light Racing	Chevrolet
7	Justin Allgaier (P)	JR Motorsports	Chevrolet
08	Stefan Parsons	SS-Green Light Racing	Chevrolet
8	Josh Berry	JR Motorsports	Chevrolet
9	Brandon Jones	JR Motorsports	Chevrolet
10	Daniel Hemric	Kaulig Racing	Chevrolet
11	Layne Riggs	Kaulig Racing	Chevrolet
16	Chandler Smith (R) (P)	Kaulig Racing	Chevrolet
18	Sammy Smith (R) (P)	Joe Gibbs Racing	Toyota
19	Myatt Snider	Joe Gibbs Racing	Toyota
20	John Hunter Nemechek (P)	Joe Gibbs Racing	Toyota
21	Austin Hill (P)	Richard Childress Racing	Chevrolet
24	Connor Mosack (R)	Sam Hunt Racing	Toyota
25	Brett Moffitt	AM Racing	Ford
26	Kaz Grala	Sam Hunt Racing	Toyota
27	Jeb Burton	Jordan Anderson Racing	Chevrolet
28	C. J. McLaughlin	RSS Racing	Ford
29	Kyle Sieg	RSS Racing	Ford
31	Parker Retzlaff (R)	Jordan Anderson Racing	Chevrolet
35	Joey Gase	Emerling-Gase Motorsports	Toyota
38	Joe Graf Jr.	RSS Racing	Ford
39	Ryan Sieg	RSS Racing	Ford
43	Ryan Ellis	Alpha Prime Racing	Ford
44	Daniel Dye (i)	Alpha Prime Racing	Chevrolet
45	Rajah Caruth (i)	Alpha Prime Racing	Chevrolet
48	Parker Kligerman	Big Machine Racing	Chevrolet
51	Jeremy Clements	Jeremy Clements Racing	Chevrolet
53	Patrick Emerling	Emerling-Gase Motorsports	Chevrolet
66	Ryan Reed	MBM Motorsports	Chevrolet
74	Dawson Cram	CHK Racing	Chevrolet
78	Anthony Alfredo	B. J. McLeod Motorsports	Chevrolet
91	Kyle Weatherman	DGM Racing	Chevrolet
92	Josh Williams	DGM Racing	Chevrolet
98	Riley Herbst	Stewart-Haas Racing	Ford
Official entry list

== Practice ==
The first and only practice session was held on Friday, October 13, at 4:05 PM PST, and would last for 20 minutes. Cole Custer, driving for Stewart-Haas Racing, would set the fastest time in the session, with a lap of 30.376, and an average speed of 177.772 mph (286.096 km/h).

Pos.	#	Driver	Team	Make	Time	Speed
1	00	Cole Custer (P)	Stewart-Haas Racing	Ford	30.376	177.772
2	10	Daniel Hemric	Kaulig Racing	Chevrolet	30.443	177.381
3	31	Parker Retzlaff (R)	Jordan Anderson Racing	Chevrolet	30.528	176.887
Full practice results

== Qualifying ==
Qualifying was held on Friday, October 13, at 4:35 PM CST. Since Las Vegas Motor Speedway is an intermediate racetrack, the qualifying system used is a single-car, one-lap system with only one round. In that round, whoever sets the fastest time will win the pole. Josh Berry, driving for JR Motorsports, would score the pole for the race, with a lap of 29.671, and an average speed of 181.996 mph (292.894 km/h).

Pos.	#	Driver	Team	Make	Time	Speed
1	8	Josh Berry	JR Motorsports	Chevrolet	29.671	181.996
2	00	Cole Custer (P)	Stewart-Haas Racing	Ford	29.719	181.702
3	18	Sammy Smith (R) (P)	Joe Gibbs Racing	Toyota	29.761	181.446
4	16	Chandler Smith (R) (P)	Kaulig Racing	Chevrolet	29.797	181.226
5	31	Parker Retzlaff (R)	Jordan Anderson Racing	Chevrolet	29.804	181.184
6	10	Daniel Hemric	Kaulig Racing	Chevrolet	29.854	180.880
7	7	Justin Allgaier (P)	JR Motorsports	Chevrolet	29.881	180.717
8	98	Riley Herbst	Stewart-Haas Racing	Ford	29.905	180.572
9	11	Layne Riggs	Kaulig Racing	Chevrolet	29.959	180.246
10	21	Austin Hill (P)	Richard Childress Racing	Chevrolet	30.004	179.976
11	48	Parker Kligerman	Big Machine Racing	Chevrolet	30.104	179.378
12	91	Kyle Weatherman	DGM Racing	Chevrolet	30.127	179.241
13	9	Brandon Jones	JR Motorsports	Chevrolet	30.173	178.968
14	1	Sam Mayer (P)	JR Motorsports	Chevrolet	30.193	178.849
15	2	Sheldon Creed (P)	Richard Childress Racing	Chevrolet	30.241	178.566
16	51	Jeremy Clements	Jeremy Clements Racing	Chevrolet	30.250	178.512
17	39	Ryan Sieg	RSS Racing	Ford	30.280	178.336
18	27	Jeb Burton	Jordan Anderson Racing	Chevrolet	30.296	178.241
19	19	Myatt Snider	Joe Gibbs Racing	Toyota	30.318	178.112
20	78	Anthony Alfredo	B. J. McLeod Motorsports	Chevrolet	30.336	178.006
21	74	Dawson Cram	CHK Racing	Chevrolet	30.350	177.924
22	26	Kaz Grala	Sam Hunt Racing	Toyota	30.407	177.591
23	44	Daniel Dye (i)	Alpha Prime Racing	Chevrolet	30.463	177.264
24	29	Kyle Sieg	RSS Racing	Ford	30.471	177.218
25	66	Ryan Reed	MBM Motorsports	Chevrolet	30.559	176.707
26	92	Josh Williams	DGM Racing	Chevrolet	30.596	176.494
27	25	Brett Moffitt	AM Racing	Ford	30.720	175.781
28	24	Connor Mosack (R)	Sam Hunt Racing	Toyota	30.771	175.490
29	08	Stefan Parsons	SS-Green Light Racing	Chevrolet	30.784	175.416
30	38	Joe Graf Jr.	RSS Racing	Ford	30.863	174.967
31	02	Blaine Perkins (R)	Our Motorsports	Chevrolet	30.938	174.543
32	43	Ryan Ellis	Alpha Prime Racing	Ford	31.152	173.344
33	53	Patrick Emerling	Emerling-Gase Motorsports	Chevrolet	31.187	173.149
Qualified by owner's points
34	6	Brennan Poole	JD Motorsports	Chevrolet	31.253	172.783
35	45	Rajah Caruth (i)	Alpha Prime Racing	Chevrolet	31.340	172.304
36	35	Joey Gase	Emerling-Gase Motorsports	Toyota	31.436	171.778
37	28	C. J. McLaughlin	RSS Racing	Ford	31.995	168.776
38	20	John Hunter Nemechek (P)	Joe Gibbs Racing	Toyota	–	–
Failed to qualify
39	4	Garrett Smithley	JD Motorsports	Chevrolet	31.487	171.499
40	07	Gray Gaulding	SS-Green Light Racing	Chevrolet	31.576	171.016
Official qualifying results
Official starting lineup

== Race results ==
Stage 1 Laps: 45

Pos.	#	Driver	Team	Make	Pts
1	00	Cole Custer (P)	Stewart-Haas Racing	Ford	10
2	16	Chandler Smith (R) (P)	Kaulig Racing	Chevrolet	9
3	18	Sammy Smith (R) (P)	Joe Gibbs Racing	Toyota	8
4	10	Daniel Hemric	Kaulig Racing	Chevrolet	7
5	21	Austin Hill (P)	Richard Childress Racing	Chevrolet	6
6	20	John Hunter Nemechek (P)	Joe Gibbs Racing	Toyota	5
7	7	Justin Allgaier (P)	JR Motorsports	Chevrolet	4
8	9	Brandon Jones	JR Motorsports	Chevrolet	3
9	48	Parker Kligerman	Big Machine Racing	Chevrolet	2
10	98	Riley Herbst	Stewart-Haas Racing	Ford	1

Stage 2 Laps: 45

Pos.	#	Driver	Team	Make	Pts
1	98	Riley Herbst	Stewart-Haas Racing	Ford	10
2	00	Cole Custer (P)	Stewart-Haas Racing	Ford	9
3	20	John Hunter Nemechek (P)	Joe Gibbs Racing	Toyota	8
4	7	Justin Allgaier (P)	JR Motorsports	Chevrolet	7
5	10	Daniel Hemric	Kaulig Racing	Chevrolet	6
6	16	Chandler Smith (R) (P)	Kaulig Racing	Chevrolet	5
7	8	Josh Berry	JR Motorsports	Chevrolet	4
8	1	Sam Mayer (P)	JR Motorsports	Chevrolet	3
9	18	Sammy Smith (R) (P)	Joe Gibbs Racing	Toyota	2
10	9	Brandon Jones	JR Motorsports	Chevrolet	1

Stage 3 Laps: 111

Pos.	St	#	Driver	Team	Make	Laps	Led	Status	Pts
1	8	98	Riley Herbst	Stewart-Haas Racing	Ford	201	103	Running	51
2	38	20	John Hunter Nemechek (P)	Joe Gibbs Racing	Toyota	201	0	Running	48
3	2	00	Cole Custer (P)	Stewart-Haas Racing	Ford	201	62	Running	53
4	4	16	Chandler Smith (R) (P)	Kaulig Racing	Chevrolet	201	23	Running	47
5	14	1	Sam Mayer (P)	JR Motorsports	Chevrolet	201	0	Running	35
6	7	7	Justin Allgaier (P)	JR Motorsports	Chevrolet	201	0	Running	42
7	10	21	Austin Hill (P)	Richard Childress Racing	Chevrolet	201	0	Running	36
8	13	9	Brandon Jones	JR Motorsports	Chevrolet	201	0	Running	33
9	6	10	Daniel Hemric	Kaulig Racing	Chevrolet	201	1	Running	41
10	9	11	Layne Riggs	Kaulig Racing	Chevrolet	201	0	Running	27
11	19	19	Myatt Snider	Joe Gibbs Racing	Toyota	200	0	Running	26
12	1	8	Josh Berry	JR Motorsports	Chevrolet	200	11	Running	29
13	11	48	Parker Kligerman	Big Machine Racing	Chevrolet	200	0	Running	26
14	5	31	Parker Retzlaff (R)	Jordan Anderson Racing	Chevrolet	200	0	Running	23
15	15	2	Sheldon Creed (P)	Richard Childress Racing	Chevrolet	200	0	Running	22
16	17	39	Ryan Sieg	RSS Racing	Ford	199	0	Running	21
17	3	18	Sammy Smith (R) (P)	Joe Gibbs Racing	Toyota	199	0	Running	30
18	24	29	Kyle Sieg	RSS Racing	Ford	199	1	Running	19
19	28	24	Connor Mosack (R)	Sam Hunt Racing	Toyota	199	0	Running	18
20	25	66	Ryan Reed	MBM Motorsports	Chevrolet	198	0	Running	17
21	23	44	Daniel Dye (i)	Alpha Prime Racing	Chevrolet	198	0	Running	0
22	18	27	Jeb Burton	Jordan Anderson Racing	Chevrolet	197	0	Running	15
23	35	45	Rajah Caruth (i)	Alpha Prime Racing	Chevrolet	197	0	Running	0
24	27	25	Brett Moffitt	AM Racing	Ford	197	0	Running	13
25	34	6	Brennan Poole	JD Motorsports	Chevrolet	197	0	Running	12
26	29	08	Stefan Parsons	SS-Green Light Racing	Chevrolet	197	0	Running	11
27	32	43	Ryan Ellis	Alpha Prime Racing	Ford	197	0	Running	10
28	31	02	Blaine Perkins (R)	Our Motorsports	Chevrolet	195	0	Running	9
29	37	28	C. J. McLaughlin	RSS Racing	Ford	194	0	Running	8
30	16	51	Jeremy Clements	Jeremy Clements Racing	Chevrolet	193	0	Running	7
31	21	74	Dawson Cram	CHK Racing	Chevrolet	193	0	Running	6
32	36	35	Joey Gase	Emerling-Gase Motorsports	Toyota	193	0	Running	5
33	26	92	Josh Williams	DGM Racing	Chevrolet	56	0	Accident	4
34	20	78	Anthony Alfredo	B. J. McLeod Motorsports	Chevrolet	54	0	Accident	3
35	22	26	Kaz Grala	Sam Hunt Racing	Toyota	53	0	Accident	2
36	12	91	Kyle Weatherman	DGM Racing	Chevrolet	53	0	Accident	1
37	30	38	Joe Graf Jr.	RSS Racing	Ford	12	0	Accident	1
38	33	53	Patrick Emerling	Emerling-Gase Motorsports	Chevrolet	3	0	Accident	1
Official race results

== Standings after the race ==
Drivers' Championship standings

	Pos	Driver	Points
	1	John Hunter Nemechek	3,103
1	2	Justin Allgaier	3,077 (-26)
1	3	Austin Hill	3,075 (–28)
1	4	Cole Custer	3,071 (–32)
1	5	Chandler Smith	3,056 (–47)
2	6	Sam Mayer	3,055 (–48)
1	7	Sammy Smith	3,036 (–67)
1	8	Sheldon Creed	3,030 (–73)
	9	Daniel Hemric	2,144 (–959)
	10	Parker Kligerman	2,126 (–977)
	11	Josh Berry	2,091 (–1,012)
	12	Jeb Burton	2,056 (–1,047)
Official driver's standings

- Note: Only the first 12 positions are included for the driver standings.

Previous race: 2023 Drive for the Cure 250	NASCAR Xfinity Series; 2023 season	Next race: 2023 Contender Boats 300
