= Coronado 250 =

Coronado 250 can refer to one of these races:

- Anduril 250, NASCAR Cup Series race at the Coronado Street Course
- United Rentals Driven to Serve 250, NASCAR O'Reilly Auto Parts Series race at the Coronado Street Course
- Navy 250, NASCAR Craftsman Truck Series race at the Coronado Street Course
