= San Diego 250 =

San Diego 250 can refer to three races:

- Anduril 250: The NASCAR Cup Series race at the Coronado Street Course
- United Rentals Driven to Serve 250: The NASCAR O'Reilly Auto Parts Series race at the Coronado Street Course
- Navy 250: The NASCAR Craftsman Truck Series race at the Coronado Street Course
