= Coronado Speed Festival =

Vintage car race in San Diego, California, US

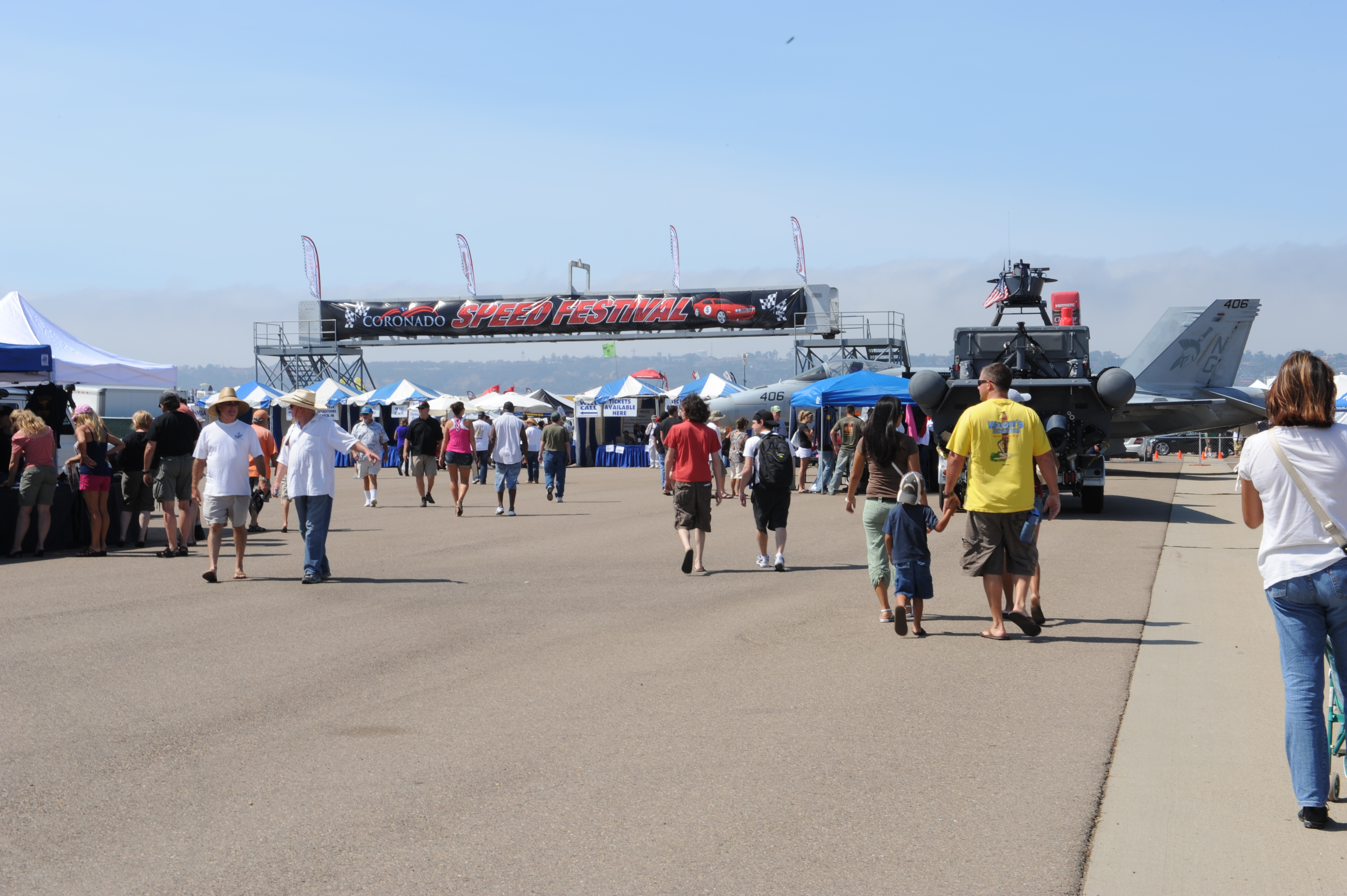
Entrance to the 2009 festival

The Coronado Speed Festival was a multi-day event promoting vintage car racing at Naval Base Coronado in San Diego County, California. The festival was held from 1997 to 2016, initially to promote the Holiday Bowl followed by San Diego's Fleet Week celebrations.

Races were held on Naval Air Station North Island's Runway 36 air strip and accompanying taxiways in partnership with the Sportscar Vintage Racing Association. The Mazda MX-5 Cup and Stadium Super Trucks also appeared at the festival.

== History ==
Organizers of the Holiday Bowl college football fixture created the Chrysler Classic Speed Festival in 1997 with the goal of raising funds for the bowl game. Steve Earle, the founder of the Monterey Motorsports Reunion, led the race's organization. The first event took place on November 22–23 with approximately 150 cars taking part. Participating cars dated as far back as 1924. Being a vintage racing event where preserving older vehicles was a priority, drivers faced a one-year suspension if they collided.

Jeep became a title sponsor in 1999, dubbing it the Chrysler–Jeep Classic Speed Festival. Earle also created RetroMobile USA, an American version of Rétromobile held at OC Fair & Event Center in nearby Costa Mesa. The field continued to grow, reaching 200 cars in 1999 then 250 by 2000. Over 30,000 attended the 2000 festival.

The 2001 festival was canceled due to increased security following the September 11 attacks. It returned in 2002 with the Chrysler Classic Speed Festival name restored and new sponsorship from North Island Financial Credit Union.

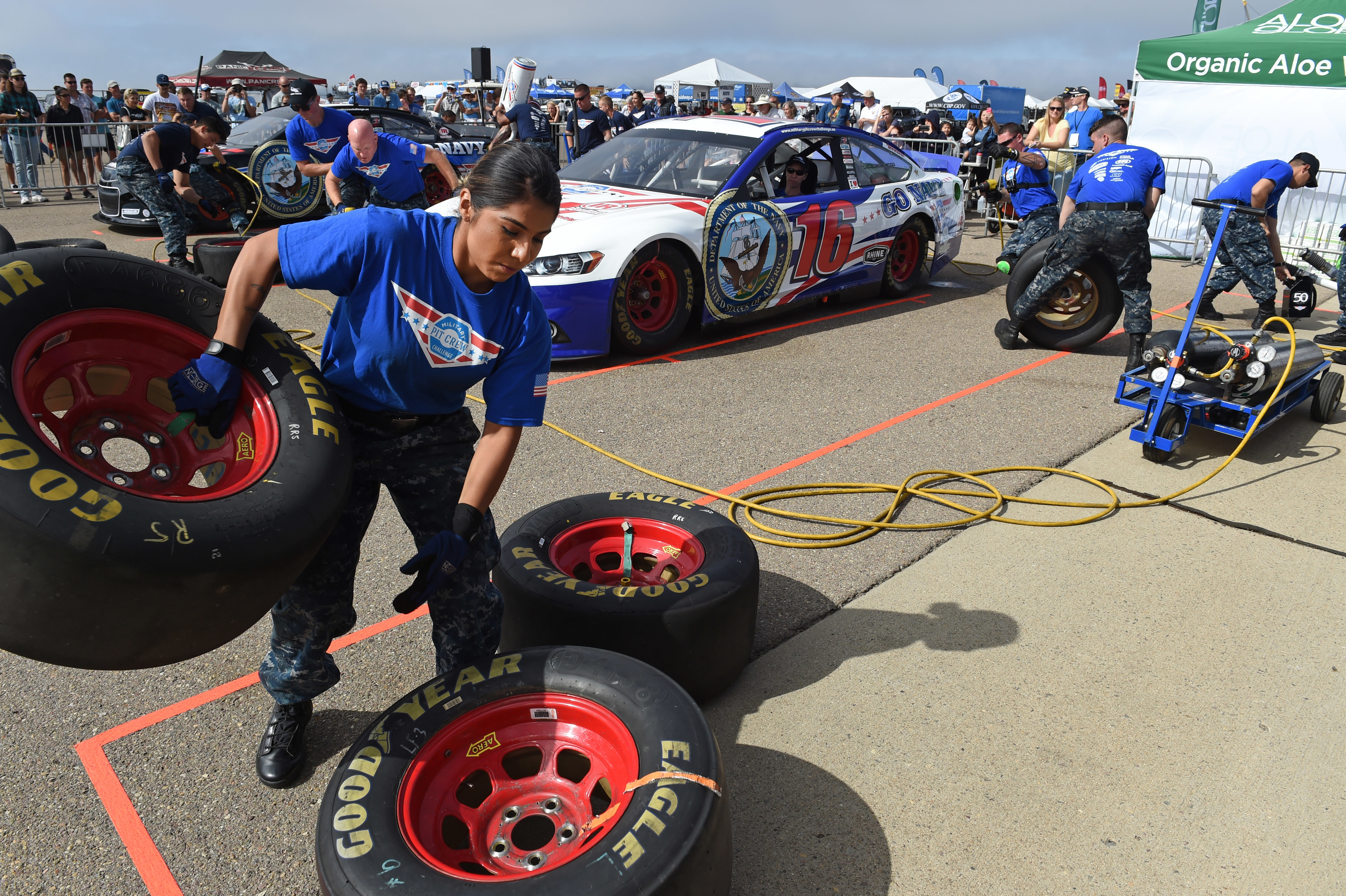
Sailors from Helicopter Maritime Strike Squadron 35 (HSM-35) competing in the 2016 Military Pit Crew Challenge

In 2005, Duncan Emmons died from a heart attack shortly before the finish. The 70-year-old auto body shop owner was driving a 1953 Kurtis 500S when he fell sick, causing his car to veer off course. The race was completed safely, Emmons classified in fourth place, and he was pronounced dead at the hospital. A street in Rancho Mirage was named after him in 2008.

The Chrysler sponsorship ended in 2007.

Management of the festival was eventually taken over by the nonprofit San Diego Fleet Week Foundation, hosting it as part of Fleet Week. A pit stop challenge for United States Navy and Marine Corps personnel was added in 2011.

The Mazda MX-5 Cup was invited to race in the festival in 2012 and 2013; John Dean won both races. In 2014, the Stadium Super Trucks added a round in Coronado as part of a Southern California weekend that began with racing at the OC Fair & Event Center; Robby Gordon won the main race.

In January 2017, the festival was canceled by the Fleet Week Foundation for financial reasons. Despite being the foundation's main event, the festival lost the organization $333,754 from 2007 to 2016. Naval Base Coronado cited required repairs to the airfield for the cancellation.

NAS North Island would eventually host racing again in 2026 with NASCAR. NASCAR O'Reilly Auto Parts Series driver Sheldon Creed was the weekend's only entrant to have also competed in the Coronado Speed Festival, finishing third in the Stadium Super Truck race in 2014.

== Track ==
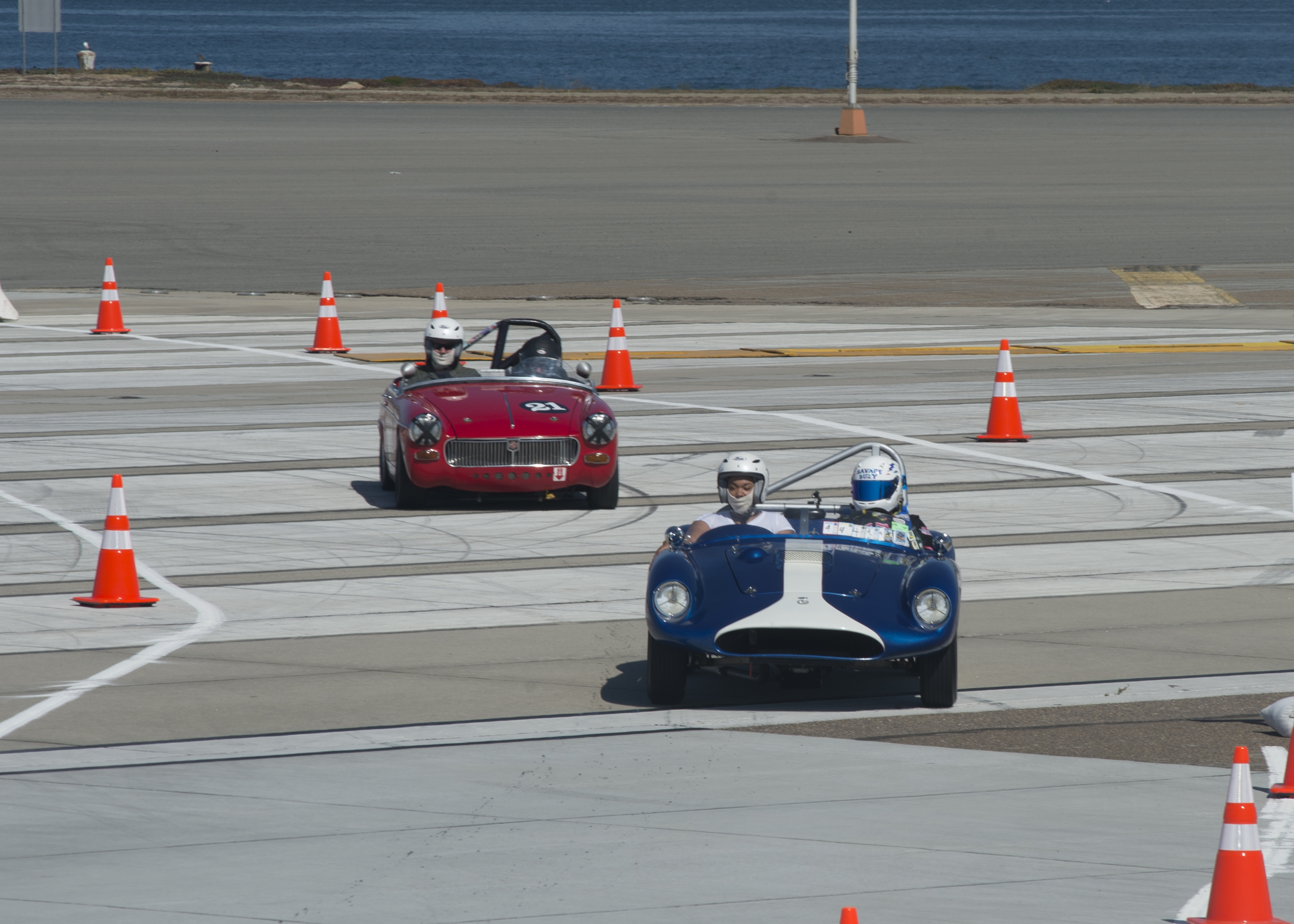
Cars racing in the 2016 festival

The track was located on Runway 36 at NAS North Island's Halsey Field. For the inaugural festival, the course was 1.5 miles (2.4 km) long with seven corners. This was extended to 1.6 miles (2.6 km) with 12 turns in 1998, then reached the final 1.7-mile (2.7 km) track and nine turns.

The couse began along the far left edge of Runway 36 with a straightaway into a righthand hairpin. This was followed by a 90-degree left turn and a straight that spanned the width of the runway and through the taxiway to reach the opposite side. Once on the far right side, cars made a right turn onto another taxiway, running down the accompanying road and through a chicane before merging onto the apron. Two right turns led to the Runway 36 entrance, where four 90° turns completed the course.

The MX-5 Cup raced on a shorter 1.44-mile (2.32 km) track with 11 corners. For the Stadium Super Trucks, ramps were added along the final two straightaways.

== See also ==
- NASCAR Cup Series at the Coronado Street Course
- NASCAR O'Reilly Auto Parts Series at the Coronado Street Course
- NASCAR Craftsman Truck Series at the Coronado Street Course
- Marine Corps Air Station New River, a Marine base that has also hosted racing
