= 2026 United Rentals Driven to Serve 250 =

NASCAR O'Reilly Auto Parts Series race at the Coronado Street Course

Race details
- Race 18 of 33 in the 2026 NASCAR O'Reilly Auto Parts Series
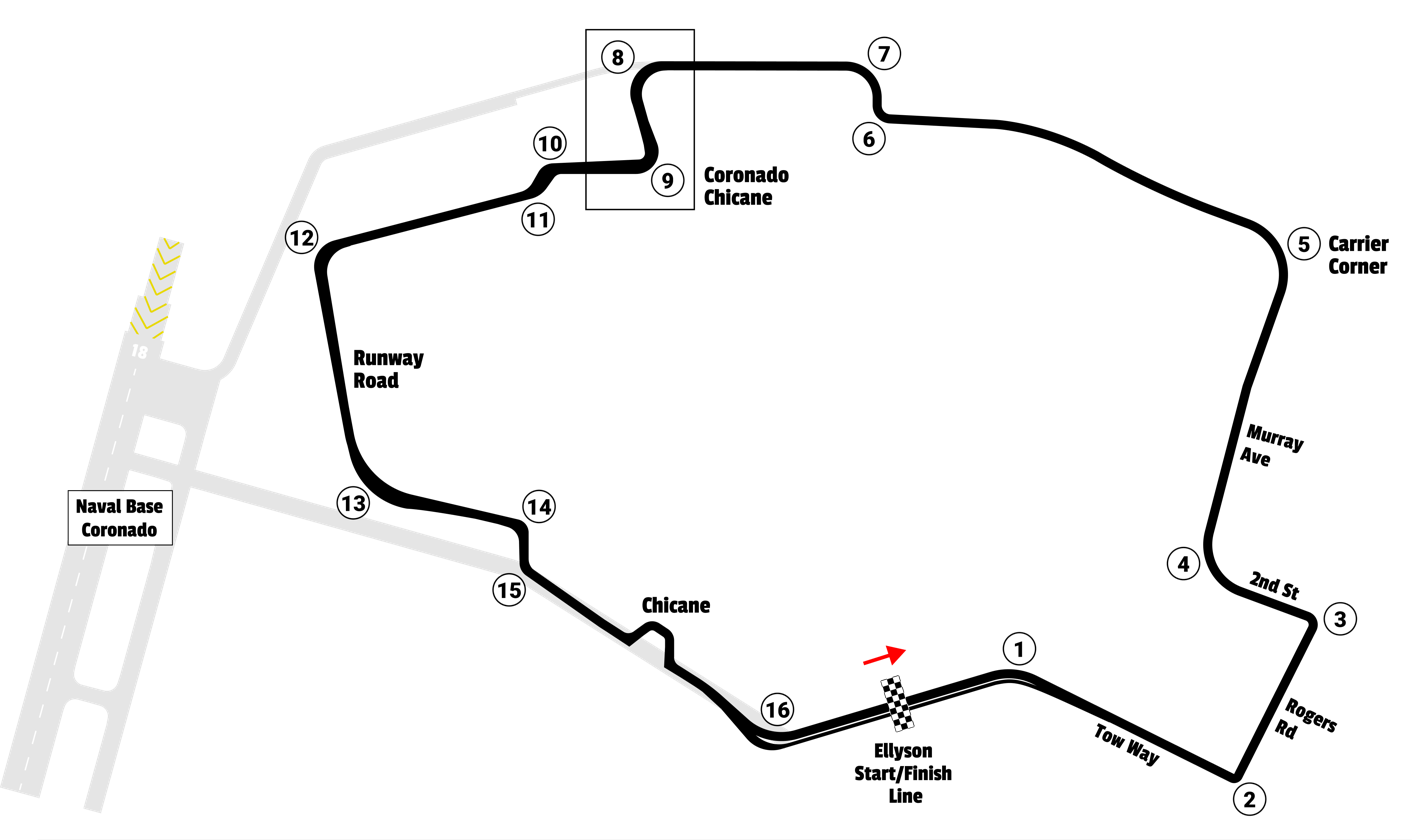
- Date: June 20, 2026
- Location: Qualcomm Circuit (located on Naval Base Coronado) in San Diego, California
- Course: Permanent racing facility
- Course length: 3.4 miles (5.472 km)
- Distance: 60 laps, 204 mi (328.306 km)
- Average speed: 58.313 miles per hour (93.846 km/h)

Pole position
Driver	Brent Crews	Joe Gibbs Racing
- Time: 2:14.294

Most laps led
Driver	Taylor Gray	Joe Gibbs Racing
- Laps: 16

Fastest lap
Driver	Carson Kvapil	JR Motorsports
- Time: 2:16.034

Winner
No. 21	Austin Hill	Richard Childress Racing

Television in the United States
- Network: The CW
- Announcers: Adam Alexander, Jamie McMurray, and Parker Kligerman

Radio in the United States
- Radio: MRN
- Booth announcers: Alex Hayden and Todd Gordon
- Turn announcers: Dave Moody (1–2), Tim Catafalmo (3–4), Kurt Becker (9–12) and Dan Hubbard (15–16)

The 2026 United Rentals Driven to Serve 250 was a NASCAR O'Reilly Auto Parts Series race held on Saturday, June 20, 2026, at Qualcomm Circuit (located on Naval Base Coronado) in San Diego, California. Contested over 60 laps on the 3.4-mile (5.5 km) road course, it was the 18th race of the 2026 NASCAR O'Reilly Auto Parts Series season, and the inaugural running of the event.

In a long and action-packed race, Austin Hill, driving for Richard Childress Racing, made an aggressive move on Taylor Gray with two laps to go, and held off him in the final lap to earn his 16th career NASCAR O'Reilly Auto Parts Series win, and his second of the season. Hill led 13 laps and won the first stage, and Gray won stage two, leading a race-high 16 laps. Creed finished third, with Carson Kvapil and Sammy Smith rounding out the top five. Jesse Love, Parker Retzlaff, Austin Green, Harrison Burton, and Corey Day rounded out the top ten.

The race was marred by a manhole cover that a lap car launched in the air and struck Corey Day's radiator, causing him to miss 5 laps. The race was under a red flag while the United States Navy Welding Team, or "Steel Team 6", worked through the race day crowds to enter the track to repair the track incident. The first time that active duty servicemembers, Dylan Thorn and Patrick Tanzi, have entered an active NASCAR track. Another incident delayed the race by 45 minutes with a massive wreck shortly after halfway. On the lap 34 restart, Sam Mayer would accidentally clip the inside wall in turn one, sending him up the track and slamming into the outside wall. Several other drivers were involved while trying to avoid the incident, including race winning contender Brent Crews. 25 drivers were confirmed to have been involved in the incident and resulted in a 43-minute red flag to repair the outside wall. Anthony Alfredo lost feeling in his left knee and initially struggled to climb from his car following the wreck but later recovered and was released from the infield care center.

== Report ==
=== Background ===
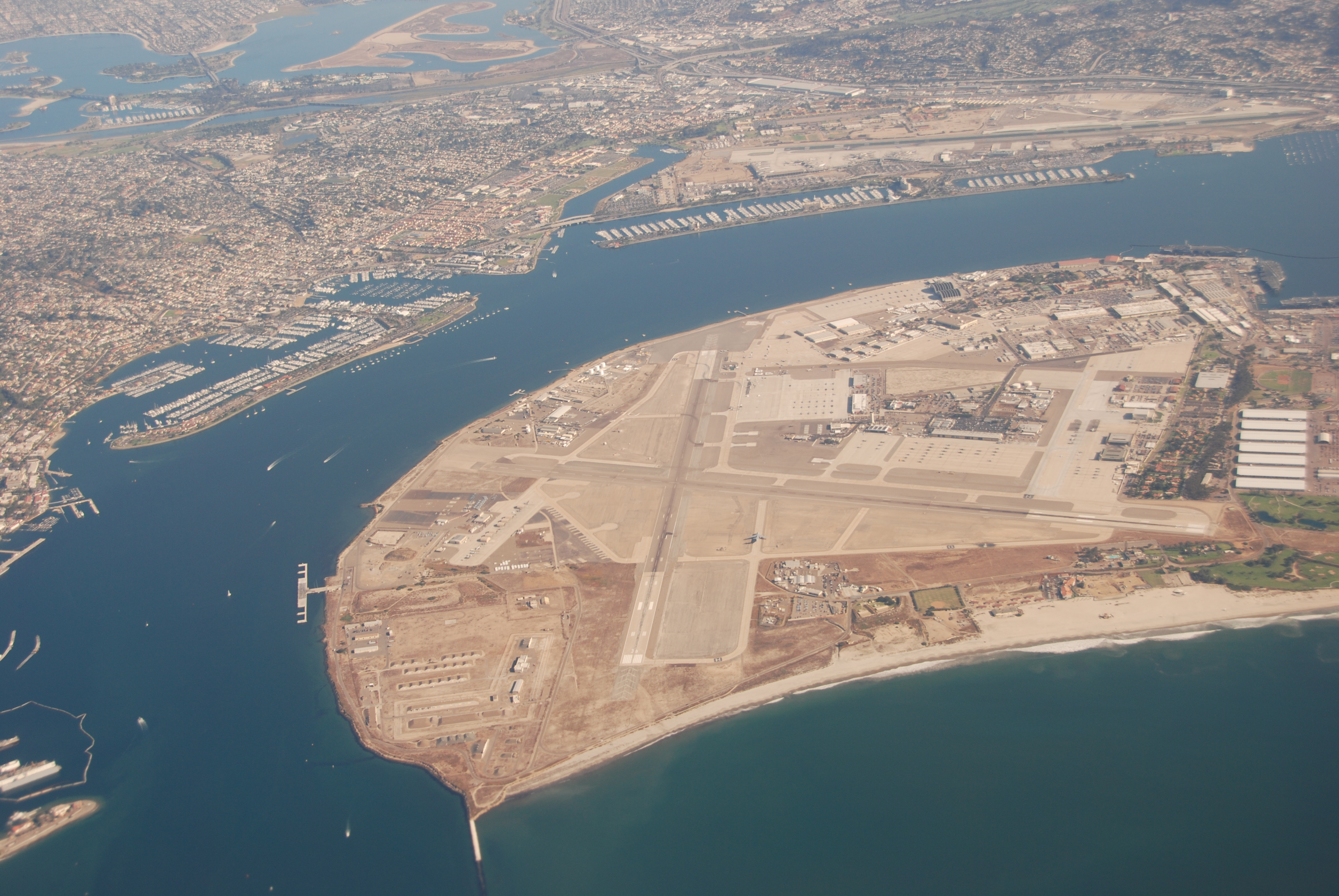
An aerial view of the Naval Air Station North Island element of Naval Base Coronado during 2010

Coronado Street Course (also known as Qualcomm Circuit for sponsorship reasons) is a 3.400 mi (5.472 km) street circuit on Naval Base Coronado (more specifically Naval Air Station North Island) that will host the NASCAR Cup Series, O'Reilly Auto Parts Series and the Truck Series. It previously hosted the Global MX-5 Cup in 2012 and 2013, and Stadium Super Trucks in 2014 as part of Speed Festival, which was also held there between 1997 and 2016.

Rumors began that NASCAR was looking to hold a street race in the SoCal area, after the removal of the Chicago Street Race. It was officially announced on July 23, 2025, that NASCAR would host a first of its kind street race on the Naval Base Coronado, with the lower national series O'Reilly Auto Parts Series and the Truck Series following suit.

NASCAR might be forced to move the race due to the 2026 Iran war, and as part of its normal contingency planning it does have a back-up plan if need be.

This race will be held in commemoration of the United States Navy's 250th birthday alongside the country's 250th.

United Rentals was announced as the title sponsor on May 27.

=== Entry list ===
- (R) denotes rookie driver.
- (i) denotes driver who is ineligible for series driver points.

#	Driver	Team	Make
00	Sheldon Creed	Haas Factory Team	Chevrolet
0	Alex Labbé	SS-Green Light Racing	Chevrolet
1	Carson Kvapil	JR Motorsports	Chevrolet
02	Ryan Ellis	Young's Motorsports	Chevrolet
2	Jesse Love	Richard Childress Racing	Chevrolet
07	Josh Bilicki	SS-Green Light Racing	Chevrolet
7	Justin Allgaier	JR Motorsports	Chevrolet
8	Sammy Smith	JR Motorsports	Chevrolet
17	Corey Day	Hendrick Motorsports	Chevrolet
18	William Sawalich	Joe Gibbs Racing	Toyota
19	Brent Crews (R)	Joe Gibbs Racing	Toyota
20	Brandon Jones	Joe Gibbs Racing	Toyota
21	Austin Hill	Richard Childress Racing	Chevrolet
24	Harrison Burton	Sam Hunt Racing	Toyota
26	Dean Thompson	Sam Hunt Racing	Toyota
27	Jeb Burton	Jordan Anderson Racing	Chevrolet
28	Kyle Sieg	RSS Racing	Chevrolet
31	Blaine Perkins	Jordan Anderson Racing	Chevrolet
32	Andrew Patterson	Jordan Anderson Racing	Chevrolet
35	Dawson Cram	Joey Gase Motorsports	Chevrolet
39	Ryan Sieg	RSS Racing	Chevrolet
41	Sam Mayer	Haas Factory Team	Chevrolet
42	Baltazar Leguizamón	Young's Motorsports	Chevrolet
44	Brennan Poole	Alpha Prime Racing	Chevrolet
45	Lavar Scott (R)	Alpha Prime Racing	Chevrolet
48	Patrick Staropoli (R)	Big Machine Racing	Chevrolet
50	Preston Pardus	Pardus Racing	Chevrolet
51	Jeremy Clements	Jeremy Clements Racing	Chevrolet
53	Joey Gase	Joey Gase Motorsports	Chevrolet
54	Taylor Gray	Joe Gibbs Racing	Toyota
55	Brad Perez	Joey Gase Motorsports	Toyota
87	Austin Green	Peterson Racing	Chevrolet
88	Rajah Caruth	JR Motorsports	Chevrolet
91	Jesse Iwuji	DGM Racing	Chevrolet
92	Leland Honeyman (i)	DGM Racing	Chevrolet
96	Anthony Alfredo	Viking Motorsports	Chevrolet
99	Parker Retzlaff	Viking Motorsports	Chevrolet
Official entry list

== Practice ==
The first and only practice session was held on Friday, June 19, at 12:30 PM PST, and lasted for 50 minutes.

Austin Green, driving for Peterson Racing, set the fastest time in the session, with a lap of 2:15.503 seconds, and a speed of 90.330 miles per hour (145.372 km/h).

Pos.	#	Driver	Team	Make	Time	Speed
1	87	Austin Green	Peterson Racing	Chevrolet	2:15.503	90.330
2	19	Brent Crews (R)	Joe Gibbs Racing	Toyota	2:15.761	90.158
3	21	Austin Hill	Richard Childress Racing	Chevrolet	2:16.235	89.845
Full practice results

== Qualifying ==
Qualifying was held on Saturday, June 20, at 10:00 AM PST. Since Qualcomm Circuit has a road course layout, the qualifying procedure used was a two-group system with one round. Drivers were separated into two groups, A and B. Each driver had multiple laps to set a time. Whoever set the fastest time between both groups won the pole.

Under a 2021 rule change, the timing line in road course qualifying is "not" the start-finish line. Instead, the timing line for qualifying was set at the exit of Turn 15 before the chicane. Brent Crews, driving for Joe Gibbs Racing, qualified on pole position with a lap of 2:14.294 seconds, and a speed of 91.143 miles per hour (146.680 km/h).

No drivers failed to qualify.

=== Qualifying results ===
Pos.	#	Driver	Team	Make	Time	Speed
1	19	Brent Crews (R)	Joe Gibbs Racing	Toyota	2:14.294	91.143
2	99	Parker Retzlaff	Viking Motorsports	Chevrolet	2:14.456	91.033
3	96	Anthony Alfredo	Viking Motorsports	Chevrolet	2:14.533	90.981
4	21	Austin Hill	Richard Childress Racing	Chevrolet	2:14.555	90.967
5	1	Carson Kvapil	JR Motorsports	Chevrolet	2:14.630	90.916
6	41	Sam Mayer	Haas Factory Team	Chevrolet	2:14.779	90.815
7	00	Sheldon Creed	Haas Factory Team	Chevrolet	2:15.009	90.661
8	87	Austin Green	Peterson Racing	Chevrolet	2:15.118	90.587
9	18	William Sawalich	Joe Gibbs Racing	Toyota	2:15.515	90.322
10	8	Sammy Smith	JR Motorsports	Chevrolet	2:15.649	90.233
11	54	Taylor Gray	Joe Gibbs Racing	Toyota	2:15.730	90.179
12	0	Alex Labbé	SS-Green Light Racing	Chevrolet	2:16.520	89.657
13	50	Preston Pardus	Pardus Racing	Chevrolet	2:16.541	89.643
14	45	Lavar Scott (R)	Alpha Prime Racing	Chevrolet	2:16.834	89.451
15	24	Harrison Burton	Sam Hunt Racing	Toyota	2:16.969	89.363
16	7	Justin Allgaier	JR Motorsports	Chevrolet	2:17.027	89.325
17	07	Josh Bilicki	SS-Green Light Racing	Chevrolet	2:17.205	89.210
18	44	Brennan Poole	Alpha Prime Racing	Chevrolet	2:17.384	89.093
19	02	Ryan Ellis	Young's Motorsports	Chevrolet	2:17.597	88.955
20	31	Blaine Perkins	Jordan Anderson Racing	Chevrolet	2:17.626	88.937
21	88	Rajah Caruth	JR Motorsports	Chevrolet	2:17.817	88.813
22	27	Jeb Burton	Jordan Anderson Racing	Chevrolet	2:18.050	88.664
23	26	Dean Thompson	Sam Hunt Racing	Toyota	2:18.476	88.391
24	39	Ryan Sieg	RSS Racing	Chevrolet	2:18.523	88.361
25	92	Leland Honeyman (i)	DGM Racing	Chevrolet	2:18.683	88.259
26	55	Brad Perez	Joey Gase Motorsports	Toyota	2:19.008	88.052
27	51	Jeremy Clements	Jeremy Clements Racing	Chevrolet	2:19.104	87.992
28	48	Patrick Staropoli (R)	Big Machine Racing	Chevrolet	2:19.502	87.741
29	28	Kyle Sieg	RSS Racing	Chevrolet	2:19.520	87.729
30	32	Andrew Patterson	Jordan Anderson Racing	Chevrolet	2:19.535	87.720
31	17	Corey Day	Hendrick Motorsports	Chevrolet	2:20.080	87.379
32	42	Baltazar Leguizamón	Young's Motorsports	Chevrolet	2:21.311	86.617
Qualified by owner's points
33	20	Brandon Jones	Joe Gibbs Racing	Toyota	2:22.354	85.983
34	35	Dawson Cram	Joey Gase Motorsports	Chevrolet	2:24.965	84.434
35	91	Jesse Iwuji	DGM Racing	Chevrolet	2:25.831	83.933
36	53	Joey Gase	Joey Gase Motorsports	Chevrolet	2:26.363	83.628
37	2	Jesse Love	Richard Childress Racing	Chevrolet	—	—
Official qualifying results
Official starting lineup

== Race ==
=== Race results ===
==== Stage Results ====
Stage One Laps: 15

Pos.	#	Driver	Team	Make	Pts
1	21	Austin Hill	Richard Childress Racing	Chevrolet	10
2	99	Parker Retzlaff	Viking Motorsports	Chevrolet	9
3	41	Sam Mayer	Haas Factory Team	Chevrolet	8
4	96	Anthony Alfredo	Viking Motorsports	Chevrolet	7
5	1	Carson Kvapil	JR Motorsports	Chevrolet	6
6	8	Sammy Smith	JR Motorsports	Chevrolet	5
7	00	Sheldon Creed	Haas Factory Team	Chevrolet	4
8	87	Austin Green	Peterson Racing	Chevrolet	3
9	54	Taylor Gray	Joe Gibbs Racing	Toyota	2
10	18	William Sawalich	Joe Gibbs Racing	Toyota	1

Stage Two Laps: 15

Pos.	#	Driver	Team	Make	Pts
1	54	Taylor Gray	Joe Gibbs Racing	Toyota	10
2	99	Parker Retzlaff	Viking Motorsports	Chevrolet	9
3	96	Anthony Alfredo	Viking Motorsports	Chevrolet	8
4	17	Corey Day	Hendrick Motorsports	Chevrolet	7
5	41	Sam Mayer	Haas Factory Team	Chevrolet	6
6	19	Brent Crews (R)	Joe Gibbs Racing	Toyota	5
7	1	Carson Kvapil	JR Motorsports	Chevrolet	4
8	21	Austin Hill	Richard Childress Racing	Chevrolet	3
9	8	Sammy Smith	JR Motorsports	Chevrolet	2
10	18	William Sawalich	Joe Gibbs Racing	Toyota	1

=== Final Stage Results ===
Stage Three Laps: 30

Fin	St	#	Driver	Team	Make	Laps	Led	Status	Pts
1	4	21	Austin Hill	Richard Childress Racing	Chevrolet	60	13	Running	68
2	11	54	Taylor Gray	Joe Gibbs Racing	Toyota	60	16	Running	47
3	7	00	Sheldon Creed	Haas Factory Team	Chevrolet	60	0	Running	38
4	5	1	Carson Kvapil	JR Motorsports	Chevrolet	60	15	Running	44
5	10	8	Sammy Smith	JR Motorsports	Chevrolet	60	0	Running	39
6	37	2	Jesse Love	Richard Childress Racing	Chevrolet	60	0	Running	31
7	2	99	Parker Retzlaff	Viking Motorsports	Chevrolet	60	5	Running	48
8	8	87	Austin Green	Peterson Racing	Chevrolet	60	0	Running	32
9	15	24	Harrison Burton	Sam Hunt Racing	Toyota	60	0	Running	28
10	31	17	Corey Day	Hendrick Motorsports	Chevrolet	60	0	Running	34
11	24	39	Ryan Sieg	RSS Racing	Chevrolet	60	0	Running	26
12	33	20	Brandon Jones	Joe Gibbs Racing	Toyota	60	0	Running	25
13	20	31	Blaine Perkins	Jordan Anderson Racing	Chevrolet	60	0	Running	24
14	30	32	Andrew Patterson	Jordan Anderson Racing	Chevrolet	60	0	Running	23
15	27	51	Jeremy Clements	Jeremy Clements Racing	Chevrolet	60	0	Running	22
16	17	07	Josh Bilicki	SS-Green Light Racing	Chevrolet	60	0	Running	21
17	22	27	Jeb Burton	Jordan Anderson Racing	Chevrolet	60	0	Running	20
18	13	50	Preston Pardus	Pardus Racing	Chevrolet	60	0	Running	19
19	26	55	Brad Perez	Joey Gase Motorsports	Toyota	60	0	Running	18
20	28	48	Patrick Staropoli (R)	Big Machine Racing	Chevrolet	60	0	Running	17
21	34	35	Dawson Cram	Joey Gase Motorsports	Chevrolet	60	0	Running	16
22	21	88	Rajah Caruth	JR Motorsports	Chevrolet	60	0	Running	15
23	36	53	Joey Gase	Joey Gase Motorsports	Chevrolet	60	0	Running	14
24	18	44	Brennan Poole	Alpha Prime Racing	Chevrolet	60	0	Running	13
25	35	91	Jesse Iwuji	DGM Racing	Chevrolet	60	0	Running	12
26	25	92	Leland Honeyman (i)	DGM Racing	Chevrolet	59	0	Running	0
27	12	0	Alex Labbé	SS-Green Light Racing	Chevrolet	52	0	Electrical	10
28	23	26	Dean Thompson	Sam Hunt Racing	Toyota	52	0	Running	9
29	14	45	Lavar Scott (R)	Alpha Prime Racing	Chevrolet	48	0	Running	8
30	19	02	Ryan Ellis	Young's Motorsports	Chevrolet	47	0	Running	7
31	1	19	Brent Crews (R)	Joe Gibbs Racing	Toyota	44	11	Engine	11
32	16	7	Justin Allgaier	JR Motorsports	Chevrolet	43	0	Engine	5
33	32	42	Baltazar Leguizamón	Young's Motorsports	Chevrolet	41	0	Engine	4
34	6	41	Sam Mayer	Haas Factory Team	Chevrolet	34	0	Accident	17
35	3	96	Anthony Alfredo	Viking Motorsports	Chevrolet	34	0	Accident	17
36	9	18	William Sawalich	Joe Gibbs Racing	Toyota	34	0	Accident	3
37	29	28	Kyle Sieg	RSS Racing	Chevrolet	28	0	Engine	1
Official race results

=== Race statistics ===
- Lead changes: 10 among 5 different drivers
- Cautions/Laps: 8 for 17 laps
- Red flags: 2
- Time of race: 3 hours, 29 minutes and 54 seconds
- Average speed: 58.313 miles per hour (93.846 km/h)

== Standings after the race ==
Drivers' Championship standings

	Pos	Driver	Points
	1	Justin Allgaier	847
	2	Jesse Love	623 (–224)
	3	Corey Day	609 (–238)
	4	Sheldon Creed	607 (–240)
1	5	Austin Hill	591 (–256)
1	6	Brandon Jones	572 (–275)
	7	Carson Kvapil	567 (–280)
	8	Sammy Smith	543 (–304)
1	9	Parker Retzlaff	494 (–353)
3	10	Taylor Gray	476 (–371)
2	11	Sam Mayer	476 (–371)
1	12	William Sawalich	448 (–399)
Official driver's standings

Manufacturers' Championship standings

Pos	Manufacturer	Points
1	Chevrolet	949
2	Toyota	609 (–340)
3	Ford	189 (–760)

- Note: Only the first 12 positions are included for the driver standings.

Previous race: 2026 MillerTech Battery 250	NASCAR O'Reilly Auto Parts Series; 2026 season	Next race: 2026 Pit Boss/FoodMaxx 250
