= 2026 Anduril 250 =

NASCAR Cup Series race

Race details
- Race 17 of 36 in the 2026 NASCAR Cup Series
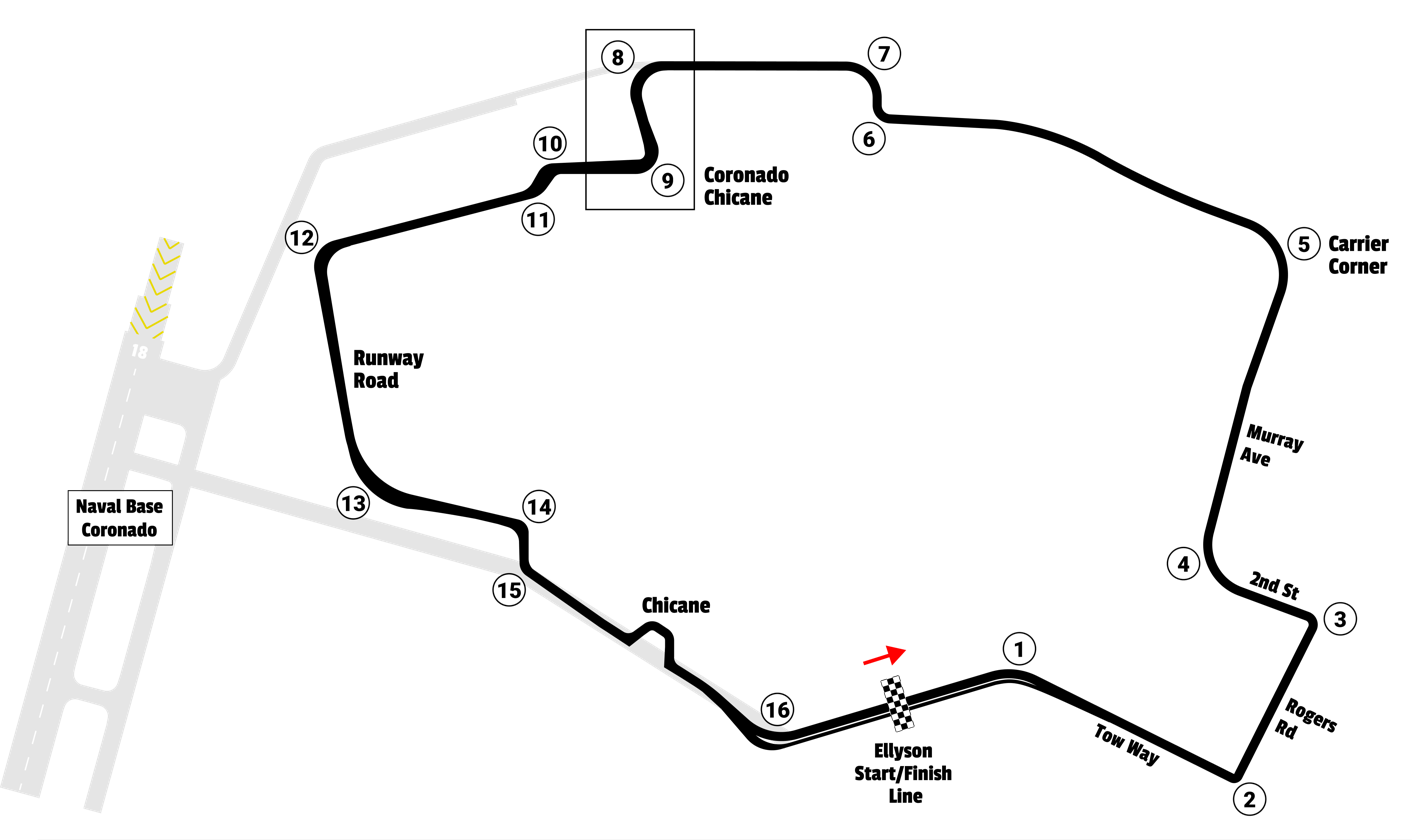
- Date: June 21, 2026
- Location: Qualcomm Circuit (located on Naval Base Coronado), San Diego, California
- Course: Street Circuit
- Course length: 3.4 miles (5.472 km)
- Distance: 75 laps, 255 mi (410.383 km)
- Average speed: 70.561 miles per hour (113.557 km/h)

Pole position
Driver	Shane van Gisbergen	Trackhouse Racing
- Time: 2:14.788

Most laps led
Driver	Ryan Blaney	Team Penske
- Laps: 12

Fastest lap
Driver	Kevin Magnussen	Trackhouse Racing
- Time: 2:12.485

Winner
No. 67	Corey Heim	23XI Racing

Television in the United States
- Network: Prime Video
- Announcers: Adam Alexander, Dale Earnhardt Jr., and Steve Letarte
- Nielsen ratings: 2.28 million

Radio in the United States
- Radio: MRN
- Booth announcers: Alex Hayden, Mike Bagley and Todd Gordon
- Turn announcers: Dave Moody (1–2), Tim Catafalmo (3–4), Kurt Becker (9–12) and Dan Hubbard (15–16)

The 2026 Anduril 250 was a NASCAR Cup Series race held on June 21, 2026, at the Qualcomm Circuit (located on Naval Base Coronado) in San Diego, California. Contested over 75 laps on the 3.4-mile (5.5 km) road course, it was the 17th race of the 2026 NASCAR Cup Series season.

Corey Heim won the race, his first NASCAR Cup Series win in just his thirteenth start in the series. Bubba Wallace finished 2nd, and Kyle Larson finished 3rd. Zane Smith and A. J. Allmendinger rounded out the top five, and Chris Buescher, Ross Chastain, Riley Herbst, Ryan Blaney, and Michael McDowell rounded out the top ten.

== Report ==
=== Background ===
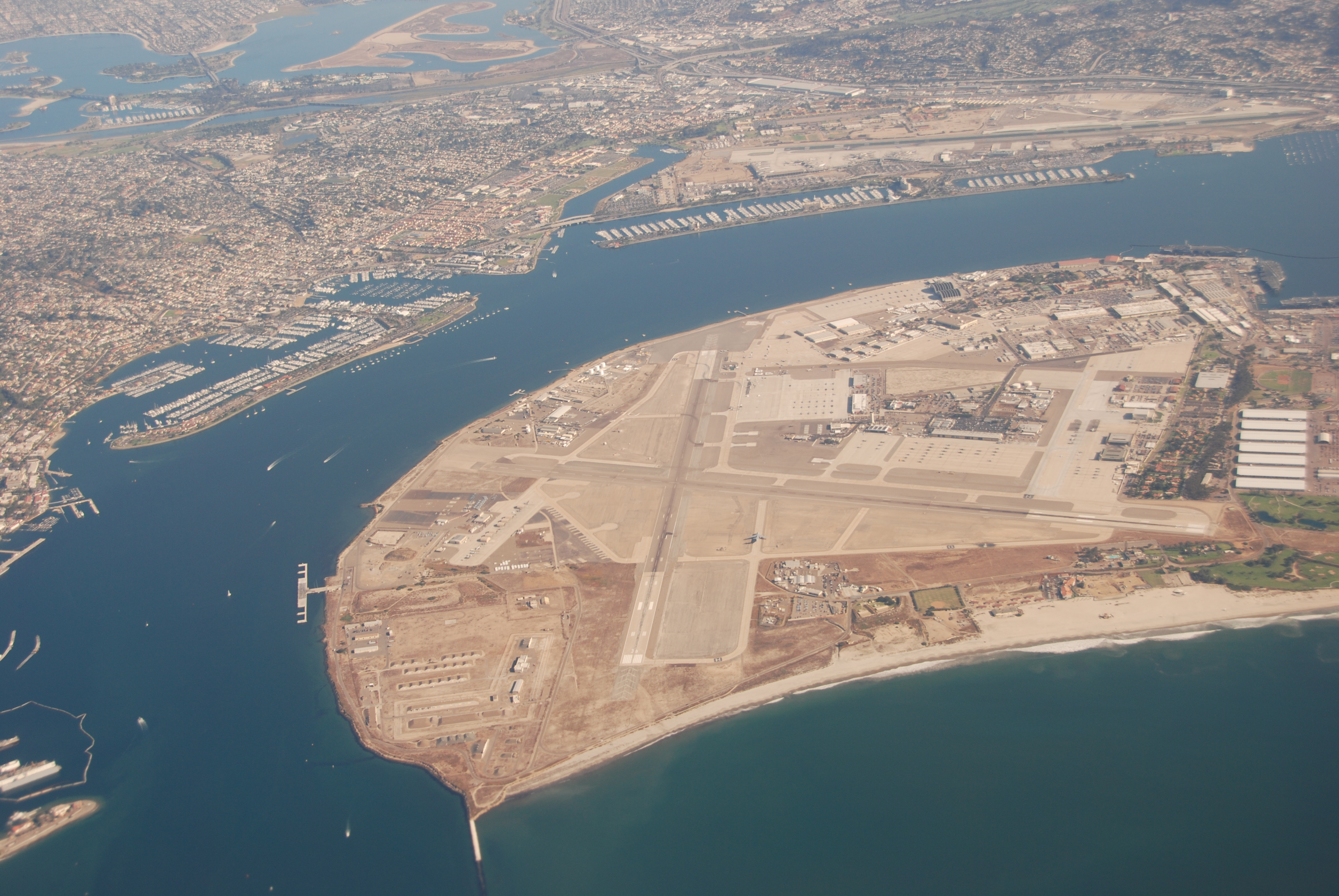
An aerial view of the Naval Air Station North Island element of Naval Base Coronado during 2010

Coronado Street Course (also known as Qualcomm Circuit for sponsorship reasons) is a 3.400 mi (5.472 km) street circuit on Naval Base Coronado (more specifically Naval Air Station North Island) that hosted the NASCAR Cup Series, O'Reilly Auto Parts Series and the Truck Series for the first time in 2026. It previously hosted the Global MX-5 Cup in 2012 and 2013, and Stadium Super Trucks in 2014 as part of Speed Festival, which was also held there between 1997 and 2016.

Rumors began that NASCAR was looking to hold a street race in the SoCal area, after the removal of the Chicago Street Race. It was officially announced on July 23, 2025, that NASCAR would host a first of its kind street race on the Naval Base Coronado, with the lower national series O'Reilly Auto Parts Series and the Truck Series following suit.

NASCAR may have been forced to move the race due to the 2026 Iran war, and as part of its normal contingency planning it did have a back-up plan if need be. The race was ultimately held as planned.

This race was held in commemoration of the United States Navy's 250th birthday alongside the country's 250th. This was the first of two motorsports events commemorating the USA's semiquincentennial, as the IndyCar Series hosted the Freedom 250 Grand Prix in Washington, D.C.

On August 14, 2025, Anduril Industries, a California based-company, was announced as the title sponsor.

==== Entry list ====
- (R) denotes rookie driver.
- (i) denotes driver who is ineligible for series driver points.

No.	Driver	Team	Manufacturer
1	Ross Chastain	Trackhouse Racing	Chevrolet
2	Austin Cindric	Team Penske	Ford
3	Austin Dillon	Richard Childress Racing	Chevrolet
4	Noah Gragson	Front Row Motorsports	Ford
5	Kyle Larson	Hendrick Motorsports	Chevrolet
6	Brad Keselowski	RFK Racing	Ford
7	Daniel Suárez	Spire Motorsports	Chevrolet
9	Chase Elliott	Hendrick Motorsports	Chevrolet
10	Ty Dillon	Kaulig Racing	Chevrolet
11	Denny Hamlin	Joe Gibbs Racing	Toyota
12	Ryan Blaney	Team Penske	Ford
16	A. J. Allmendinger	Kaulig Racing	Chevrolet
17	Chris Buescher	RFK Racing	Ford
19	Chase Briscoe	Joe Gibbs Racing	Toyota
20	Christopher Bell	Joe Gibbs Racing	Toyota
21	Josh Berry	Wood Brothers Racing	Ford
22	Joey Logano	Team Penske	Ford
23	Bubba Wallace	23XI Racing	Toyota
24	William Byron	Hendrick Motorsports	Chevrolet
33	Austin Hill (i)	Richard Childress Racing	Chevrolet
34	Todd Gilliland	Front Row Motorsports	Ford
35	Riley Herbst	23XI Racing	Toyota
38	Zane Smith	Front Row Motorsports	Ford
41	Cole Custer	Haas Factory Team	Chevrolet
42	John Hunter Nemechek	Legacy Motor Club	Toyota
43	Erik Jones	Legacy Motor Club	Toyota
45	Tyler Reddick	23XI Racing	Toyota
47	Ricky Stenhouse Jr.	Hyak Motorsports	Chevrolet
48	Alex Bowman	Hendrick Motorsports	Chevrolet
51	Cody Ware	Rick Ware Racing	Chevrolet
54	Ty Gibbs	Joe Gibbs Racing	Toyota
60	Ryan Preece	RFK Racing	Ford
67	Corey Heim (i)	23XI Racing	Toyota
71	Michael McDowell	Spire Motorsports	Chevrolet
77	Carson Hocevar	Spire Motorsports	Chevrolet
84	Jimmie Johnson	Legacy Motor Club	Toyota
88	Connor Zilisch (R)	Trackhouse Racing	Chevrolet
91	Kevin Magnussen	Trackhouse Racing	Chevrolet
97	Shane van Gisbergen	Trackhouse Racing	Chevrolet
Official entry list

== Practice ==
Kyle Larson was the fastest in the practice session with a time of 2:16.588 seconds and a speed of 89.613 mph (144.218 km/h). During the session, Brent Crews drove the No. 20 for Christopher Bell with ten-minutes left in the session.

=== Practice results ===
Pos	No.	Driver	Team	Manufacturer	Time	Speed
1	5	Kyle Larson	Hendrick Motorsports	Chevrolet	2:16.588	89.613
2	34	Todd Gilliland	Front Row Motorsports	Ford	2:16.881	89.421
3	54	Ty Gibbs	Joe Gibbs Racing	Toyota	2:16.924	89.393
Official practice results

== Qualifying ==
Shane van Gisbergen scored the pole for the race with a time of 2:14.788 and a speed of 90.809 mph (146.143 km/h).

=== Qualifying results ===
Pos	No.	Driver	Team	Manufacturer	Time	Speed
1	97	Shane van Gisbergen	Trackhouse Racing	Chevrolet	2:14.788	90.809
2	77	Carson Hocevar	Spire Motorsports	Chevrolet	2:14.944	90.704
3	12	Ryan Blaney	Team Penske	Ford	2:15.048	90.634
4	38	Zane Smith	Front Row Motorsports	Ford	2:15.391	90.405
5	34	Todd Gilliland	Front Row Motorsports	Ford	2:15.395	90.402
6	7	Daniel Suárez	Spire Motorsports	Chevrolet	2:15.433	90.377
7	60	Ryan Preece	RFK Racing	Ford	2:15.483	90.343
8	88	Connor Zilisch (R)	Trackhouse Racing	Chevrolet	2:15.883	90.077
9	71	Michael McDowell	Spire Motorsports	Chevrolet	2:15.928	90.048
10	33	Austin Hill (i)	Richard Childress Racing	Chevrolet	2:15.959	90.027
11	54	Ty Gibbs	Joe Gibbs Racing	Toyota	2:16.150	89.901
12	23	Bubba Wallace	23XI Racing	Toyota	2:16.319	89.789
13	67	Corey Heim (i)	23XI Racing	Toyota	2:16.325	89.785
14	5	Kyle Larson	Hendrick Motorsports	Chevrolet	2:16.355	89.766
15	16	A. J. Allmendinger	Kaulig Racing	Chevrolet	2:16.537	89.646
16	17	Chris Buescher	RFK Racing	Ford	2:16.631	89.584
17	45	Tyler Reddick	23XI Racing	Toyota	2:16.665	89.562
18	3	Austin Dillon	Richard Childress Racing	Chevrolet	2:16.936	89.385
19	22	Joey Logano	Team Penske	Ford	2:17.045	89.314
20	48	Alex Bowman	Hendrick Motorsports	Chevrolet	2:17.069	89.298
21	91	Kevin Magnussen	Trackhouse Racing	Chevrolet	2:17.271	89.167
22	19	Chase Briscoe	Joe Gibbs Racing	Toyota	2:17.285	89.158
23	1	Ross Chastain	Trackhouse Racing	Chevrolet	2:17.374	89.100
24	35	Riley Herbst	23XI Racing	Toyota	2:17.807	88.820
25	41	Cole Custer	Haas Factory Team	Chevrolet	2:17.837	88.801
26	11	Denny Hamlin	Joe Gibbs Racing	Toyota	2:17.874	88.777
27	24	William Byron	Hendrick Motorsports	Chevrolet	2:17.973	88.713
28	42	John Hunter Nemechek	Legacy Motor Club	Toyota	2:18.104	88.629
29	6	Brad Keselowski	RFK Racing	Ford	2:18.116	88.621
30	9	Chase Elliott	Hendrick Motorsports	Chevrolet	2:18.124	88.616
31	2	Austin Cindric	Team Penske	Ford	2:18.895	88.124
32	4	Noah Gragson	Front Row Motorsports	Ford	2:19.126	87.978
33	47	Ricky Stenhouse Jr.	Hyak Motorsports	Chevrolet	2:19.253	87.898
34	10	Ty Dillon	Kaulig Racing	Chevrolet	2:19.717	87.606
35	21	Josh Berry	Wood Brothers Racing	Ford	2:19.912	87.484
36	84	Jimmie Johnson	Legacy Motor Club	Toyota	2:22.358	85.980
37	20	Christopher Bell	Joe Gibbs Racing	Toyota	2:23.639	85.214
38	43	Erik Jones	Legacy Motor Club	Toyota	2:51.329	71.441
39	51	Cody Ware	Rick Ware Racing	Chevrolet	3:25.743	59.492
Official qualifying results

== Race ==
=== Race results ===
==== Stage results ====
Stage One Laps: 20

Pos	No	Driver	Team	Manufacturer	Points
1	12	Ryan Blaney	Team Penske	Ford	10
2	60	Ryan Preece	RFK Racing	Ford	9
3	5	Kyle Larson	Hendrick Motorsports	Chevrolet	8
4	54	Ty Gibbs	Joe Gibbs Racing	Toyota	7
5	16	A. J. Allmendinger	Kaulig Racing	Chevrolet	6
6	34	Todd Gilliland	Front Row Motorsports	Ford	5
7	77	Carson Hocevar	Spire Motorsports	Chevrolet	4
8	22	Joey Logano	Team Penske	Ford	3
9	88	Connor Zilisch (R)	Trackhouse Racing	Chevrolet	2
10	24	William Byron	Hendrick Motorsports	Chevrolet	1

Stage Two Laps: 20

Pos	No	Driver	Team	Manufacturer	Points
1	60	Ryan Preece	RFK Racing	Ford	10
2	35	Riley Herbst	23XI Racing	Toyota	9
3	17	Chris Buescher	RFK Racing	Ford	8
4	16	A. J. Allmendinger	Kaulig Racing	Chevrolet	7
5	12	Ryan Blaney	Team Penske	Ford	6
6	77	Carson Hocevar	Spire Motorsports	Chevrolet	5
7	7	Daniel Suárez	Spire Motorsports	Chevrolet	4
8	1	Ross Chastain	Trackhouse Racing	Chevrolet	3
9	34	Todd Gilliland	Front Row Motorsports	Ford	2
10	22	Joey Logano	Team Penske	Ford	1

=== Final Stage results ===
Stage Three Laps: 35

Pos	Start	No	Driver	Team	Manufacturer	Laps	Points
1	13	67	Corey Heim (i)	23XI Racing	Toyota	75	0
2	12	23	Bubba Wallace	23XI Racing	Toyota	75	35
3	14	5	Kyle Larson	Hendrick Motorsports	Chevrolet	75	42
4	4	38	Zane Smith	Front Row Motorsports	Ford	75	33
5	15	16	AJ Allmendinger	Kaulig Racing	Chevrolet	75	45
6	16	17	Chris Buescher	RFK Racing	Ford	75	39
7	23	1	Ross Chastain	Trackhouse Racing	Chevrolet	75	33
8	24	35	Riley Herbst	23XI Racing	Toyota	75	38
9	3	12	Ryan Blaney	Team Penske	Ford	75	44
10	9	71	Michael McDowell	Spire Motorsports	Chevrolet	75	27
11	7	60	Ryan Preece	RFK Motorsports	Ford	75	45
12	30	9	Chase Elliott	Hendrick Motorsports	Chevrolet	75	25
13	6	7	Daniel Suarez	Spire Motorsports	Chevrolet	75	28
14	26	11	Denny Hamlin	Joe Gibbs Racing	Toyota	75	23
15	11	54	Ty Gibbs	Joe Gibbs Racing	Toyota	75	29
16	28	42	John Hunter Nemechek	Legacy Motor Club	Toyota	75	21
17	22	19	Chase Briscoe	Joe Gibbs Racing	Toyota	75	20
18	19	22	Joey Logano	Team Penske	Ford	75	23
19	2	77	Carson Hocevar	Spire Motorsports	Chevrolet	75	27
20	38	43	Erik Jones	Legacy Motor Club	Toyota	75	17
21	5	34	Todd Gilliland	Front Row Motorsports	Ford	75	23
22	31	2	Austin Cindric	Team Penske	Ford	75	15
23	39	51	Cody Ware	Rick Ware Racing	Chevrolet	75	14
24	18	3	Austin Dillon	Richard Childress Racing	Chevrolet	75	13
25	17	45	Tyler Reddick	23XI Racing	Toyota	75	12
26	20	48	Alex Bowman	Hendrick Motorsports	Chevrolet	75	11
27	21	91	Kevin Magnussen	Trackhouse Racing	Chevrolet	75	11
28	36	84	Jimmie Johnson	Legacy Motor Club	Toyota	75	9
29	35	21	Josh Berry	Wood Brothers Racing	Ford	75	8
30	34	10	Ty Dillon	Kaulig Racing	Chevrolet	74	7
31	25	41	Cole Custer	Haas Factory Team	Chevrolet	72	6
32	27	24	William Byron	Hendrick Motorsports	Chevrolet	68	6
33	33	47	Ricky Stenhouse Jr.	Hyak Motorsports	Chevrolet	57	4
34	29	6	Brad Keselowski	RFK Racing	Ford	48	3
35	32	4	Noah Gragson	Front Row Motorsports	Ford	37	2
36	10	33	Austin Hill (i)	Richard Childress Racing	Chevrolet	31	0
37	8	88	Connor Zilisch (R)	Trackhouse Racing	Chevrolet	31	3
38	1	97	Shane van Gisbergen	Trackhouse Racing	Chevrolet	31	1
39	37	20	Christopher Bell (Note: Bell recovering from a broken wrist, got out of the car and was relieved by Brent Crews on lap 13. Since Bell started the race, he is credited with a 39th place finish.)	Joe Gibbs Racing	Toyota	28	1
Official race results

=== Race statistics ===
- Lead changes: 20 among 13 different drivers
- Cautions/Laps: 7 for 11
- Red flags: 1
- Time of race: 3 hours, 36 minutes, and 50 seconds
- Average speed: 70.561 miles per hour (113.557 km/h)

== Media ==
=== Television ===
Prime Video covered the race on the television side. Adam Alexander, Dale Earnhardt Jr. and Steve Letarte called the race from the broadcast booth. Kim Coon, Marty Snider, and Trevor Bayne handled pit road for the television side.

Prime Video
Booth announcers	Pit reporters
Lap-by-lap: Adam Alexander; Color-commentator: Dale Earnhardt Jr. Color-commentator: Steve Letarte	Kim Coon; Marty Snider; Trevor Bayne

=== Radio ===
Radio coverage of the race was broadcast by Motor Racing Network (MRN) and simulcast on Sirius XM NASCAR Radio.

MRN
Booth announcers	Turn announcers	Pit reporters
Lead announcer: Alex Hayden; Announcer: Mike Bagley; Announcer: Todd Gordon	Turns 1 & 2: Dave Moody; Turns 3 & 4: Tim Catafalmo; Turns 9 & 12: Kurt Becker; Turns 15 & 16: Dan Hubbard	Steve Post; Chris Wilner; Brienne Pedigo

== Standings after the race ==
Drivers' Championship standings

	Pos	Driver	Points
	1	Tyler Reddick	716
	2	Denny Hamlin	708 (–8)
	3	Ryan Blaney	583 (–133)
2	4	Kyle Larson	536 (–180)
	5	Ty Gibbs	535 (–181)
2	6	Chase Elliott	534 (–182)
	7	Chris Buescher	500 (–216)
	8	Daniel Suárez	478 (–238)
	9	Carson Hocevar	476 (–240)
2	10	Chase Briscoe	431 (–285)
2	11	Bubba Wallace	429 (–287)
2	12	Christopher Bell	422 (–294)
2	13	William Byron	421 (–295)
1	14	Erik Jones	372 (–344)
1	15	Austin Cindric	370 (–346)
3	16	Ryan Preece	367 (–349)
Official driver's standings

Manufacturers' Championship standings

Pos	Manufacturer	Points
1	Toyota	802
2	Chevrolet	684 (–118)
3	Ford	561 (–241)

- Note: Only the first 16 positions are included for the driver standings.

=== NASCAR In-Season Challenge bracket ===
Sonoma
1	#45 Tyler Reddick	36th
32	#48 Alex Bowman	10th
16	#2 Austin Cindric	13th
17	#6 Brad Keselowski	15th
8	#7 Daniel Suárez	31st
25	#34 Todd Gilliland	29th
9	#77 Carson Hocevar	11th
24	#38 Zane Smith	18th
12	#19 Chase Briscoe	2nd
21	#16 A. J. Allmendinger	16th
5	#54 Ty Gibbs	3rd
28	#3 Austin Dillon	27th
13	#23 Bubba Wallace	22nd
20	#71 Michael McDowell	9th
4	#9 Chase Elliott	17th
29	#4 Noah Gragson	32nd
2	#11 Denny Hamlin	26th
31	#10 Ty Dillon	35th
15	#43 Erik Jones	23rd
18	#22 Joey Logano	24th
7	#17 Chris Buescher	19th
26	#42 John Hunter Nemechek	25th
10	#20 Christopher Bell	5th
23	#1 Ross Chastain	14th
11	#24 William Byron	12th
22	#47 Ricky Stenhouse Jr.	21st
6	#5 Kyle Larson	4th
27	#35 Riley Herbst	30th
14	#97 Shane van Gisbergen	1st
19	#60 Ryan Preece	8th
3	#12 Ryan Blaney	6th
30	#21 Josh Berry	28th

Chicagoland
32	#48 Bowman	5th
16	#2 Cindric	13th
25	#34 Gilliland	16th
9	#77 Hocevar	22nd
12	#19 Briscoe	1st
5	#54 Ty Gibbs	8th
20	#71 McDowell	29th
4	#9 Elliott	11th
2	#11 Hamlin	3rd
15	#43 Jones	15th
7	#17 Buescher	19th
10	#20 Bell	2nd
11	#24 Byron	4th
6	#5 Larson	34th
14	#97 van Gisbergen	25th
3	#12 Blaney	7th

Atlanta
32	#48 Bowman	22nd
25	#34 Gilliland	19th
12	#19 Briscoe	36th
4	#9 Elliott	13th
2	#11 Hamlin	12th
10	#20 Bell	2nd
11	#24 Byron	16th
3	#12 Blaney	1st

North Wilkesboro
25	#34 Gilliland	8th
4	#9 Elliott	17th
10	#20 Bell	19th
3	#12 Blaney	11th

Indianapolis
25	#34 Gilliland	24th
3	#12 Blaney	26th

== Notes ==
Previous race: 2026 The Great American Getaway 400	NASCAR Cup Series; 2026 season	Next race: 2026 Toyota/Save Mart 350
