= Coronado Street Course =

Racetrack

Qualcomm Circuit

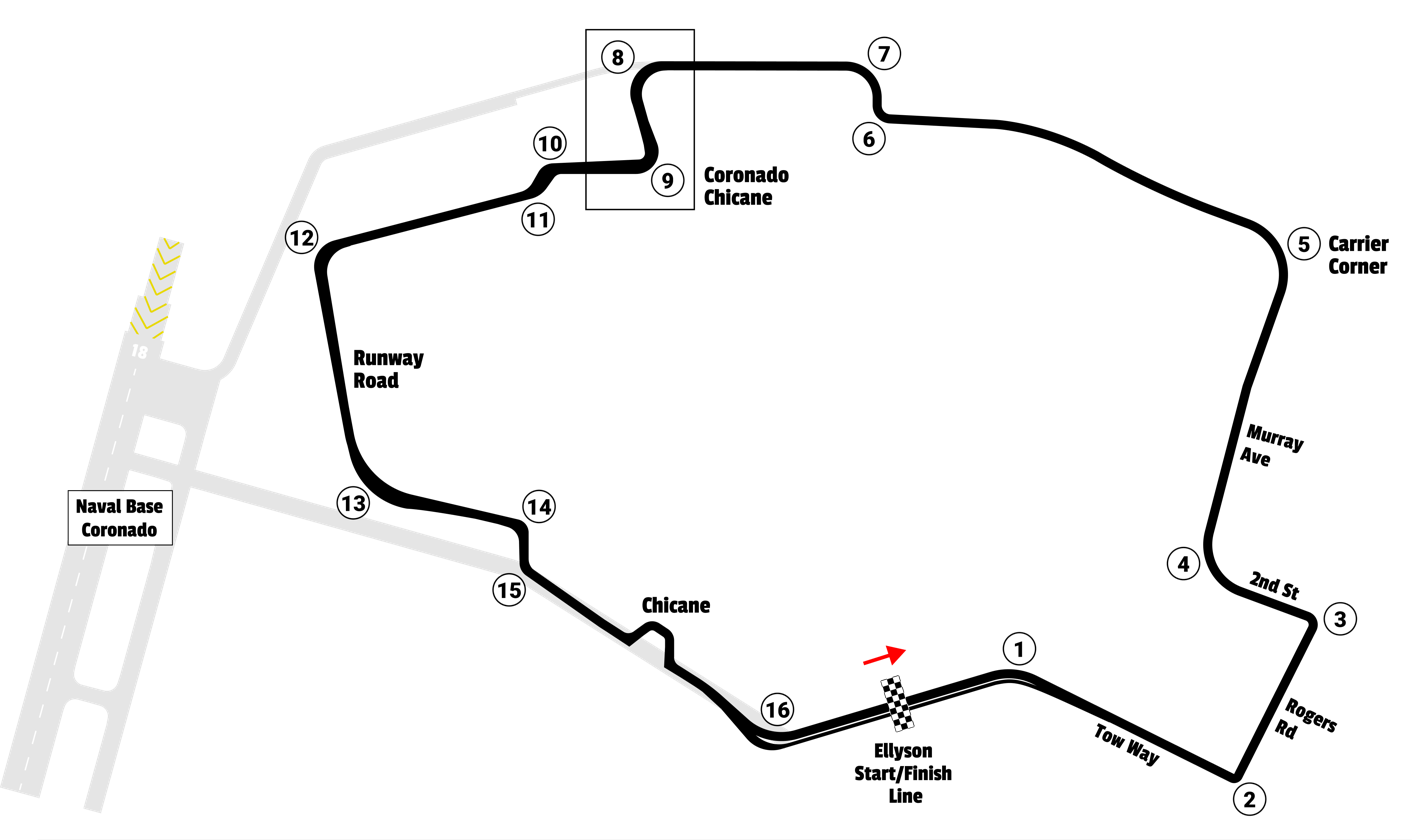
- NASCAR Circuit (2026)
- Location: Naval Base Coronado, San Diego, California
- Coordinates: 32°41′57″N 117°12′55″W
- Opened: October 1997; 28 years ago Re-Opened: June 19, 2026; 3 months ago
- Closed: September 18, 2016; 10 years ago
- Major events: Current: NASCAR Cup Series; Anduril 250 Race the Base (2026); NASCAR O'Reilly Auto Parts Series; United Rentals Driven to Serve 250 (2026); NASCAR Craftsman Truck Series; Navy 250 (2026); Former: Coronado Speed Festival (1997–2016); Stadium Super Trucks (2014); Mazda MX-5 Cup (2012–2013)

NASCAR Circuit (2026)
- Surface: Asphalt
- Length: 3.400 mi (5.472 km)
- Turns: 19
- Race lap record: 2:12.485 ( (Denmark) Kevin Magnussen, Chevrolet Camaro ZL1, 2026, NASCAR Cup)

Speed Festival Circuit (1997–2016)
- Surface: Asphalt
- Length: 1.700 mi (2.736 km)
- Turns: 9

The Coronado Street Course (also known as Qualcomm Circuit for sponsorship reasons) is a 3.400 mi (5.472 km) street circuit on Naval Base Coronado (more specifically Naval Air Station North Island) that hosts the NASCAR Cup Series and O'Reilly Auto Parts Series.

Qualcomm Circuit is the second racing track to be built on the naval base. A shorter, 1.700 mi (2.736 km) course hosted the Coronado Speed Festival from 1997 to 2016. This layout also had the Mazda MX-5 Cup in 2012 and 2013, and the Stadium Super Trucks in 2014. The NASCAR Craftsman Truck Series raced at Qualcomm Circuit in 2026.

== History ==
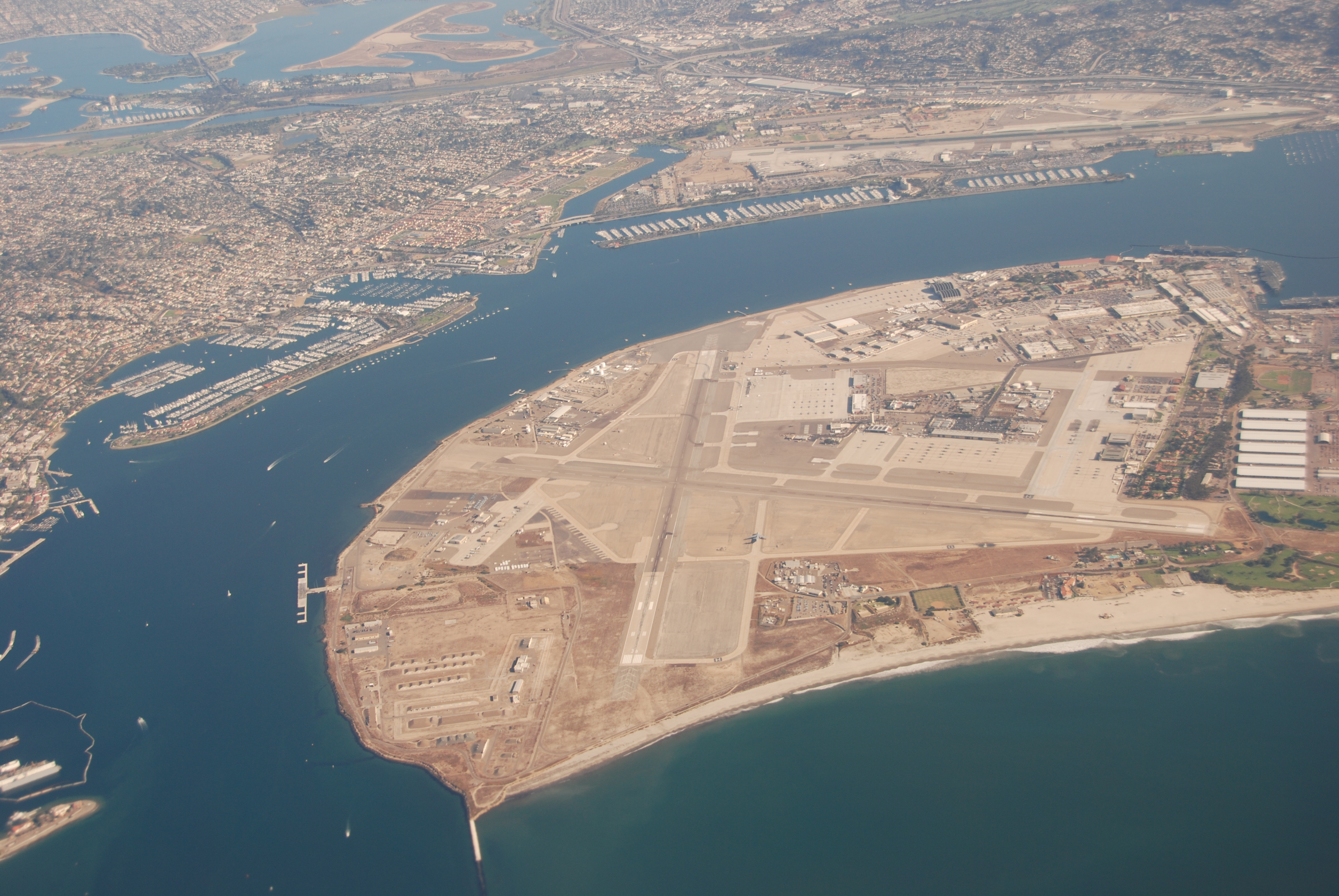
An aerial view of the Naval Air Station North Island element of Naval Base Coronado during 2010

NASCAR has previously held races in the Southern California area for most of its existence, having races at various tracks throughout the 1950s onward, with the addition of Auto Club Speedway to the schedule in 1997 as a superspeedway. It was announced on September 9, 2020, that NASCAR would shorten the track, removing the race following 2023. In 2022, NASCAR announced that its annual preseason race, the Busch Clash, would be held at Los Angeles Memorial Coliseum. It was removed from the schedule following 2024, when the Clash was moved to Bowman Gray Stadium in 2025, leaving the Southern California area without a race for 2025.

Rumors surrounding the Chicago Street Course began after the 2025 race with Chicago's mayor, Brandon Johnson, stating that his administration would like to keep Chicago on the schedule, but after considering changing dates, as the race was held on Independence Day weekend. It was then announced that the race would be removed following 2025. Other rumors began that NASCAR was looking to hold a street race in the Southern California area, as this area was vacant from the schedule. It was announced on July 23, 2025, that NASCAR would host a first of its kind street race on the Naval Base Coronado, with the lower national series O'Reilly Auto Parts Series and the Craftsman Truck Series following suit.

Qualcomm was announced as the track name on May 4. During the weekend, USS Carl Vinson was docked alongside the track and used as a studio and commentary booth by NASCAR on Prime Video.

== Track layout ==
=== Speed Festival ===
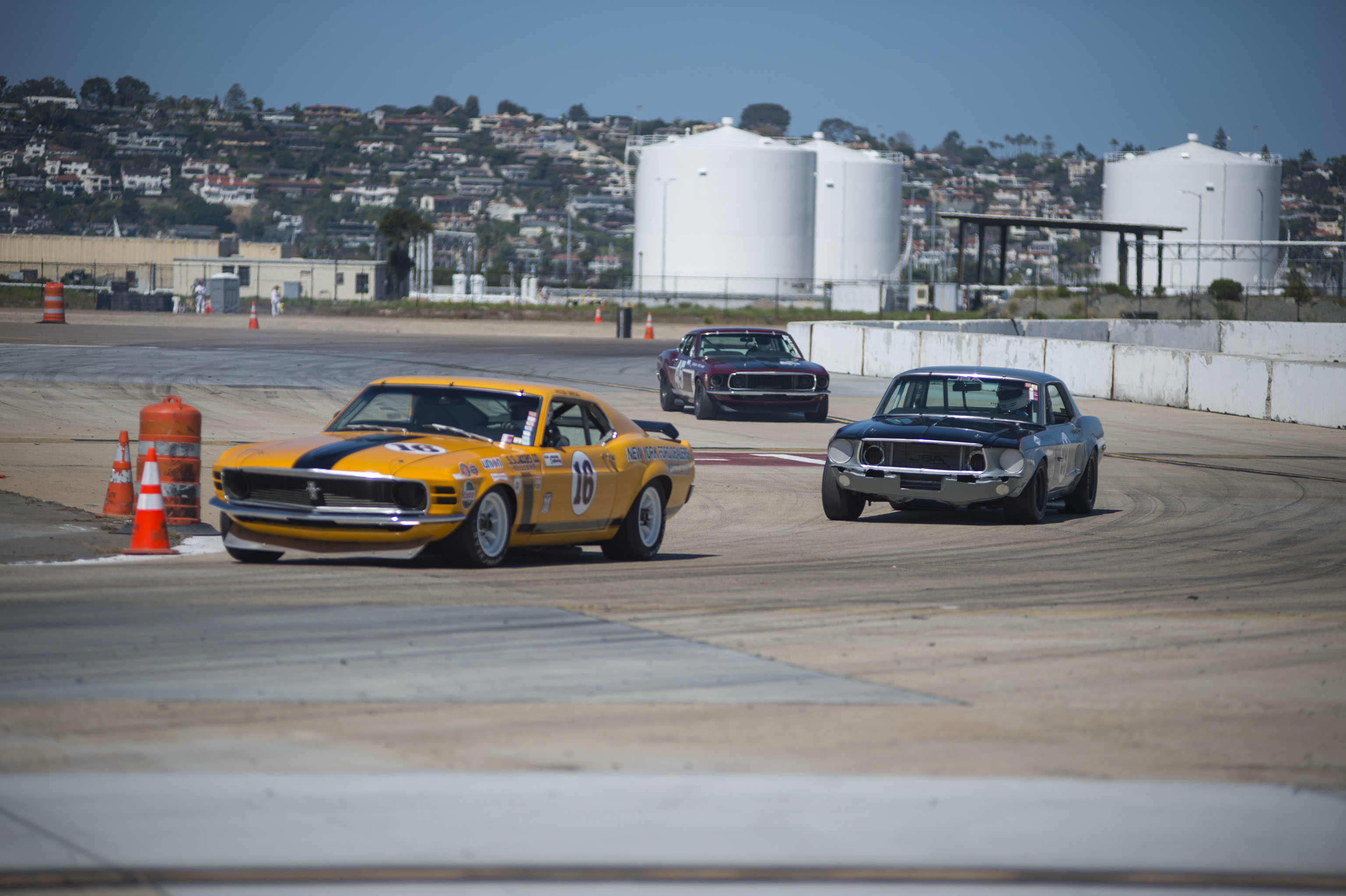
Cars competing in the 2015 Coronado Speed Festival on Runway 36

The track used for the Speed Festival began as a 1.500 mi (2.414 km) circuit with seven turns, then was extended to 1.600 mi (2.575 km) in 1998. The final 1.700 mi (2.736 km) track had nine corners.

It was held on the southern tip of Runway 36 at Halsey Field, which is typically combined with the adjacent Runway 36 strip to create Runway 18/36. A lap began with a straightaway that led into a right hairpin, followed by a 90-degree left that crossed the width of the runway and onto the taxiway. A long straight took cars into a sharp right onto another taxiway, running along the road and through a chicane before reaching the apron. A pair of right turns brought drivers onto the entrance to Runway 36, where four 90° esses completed the course.

For the Stadium Super Trucks, ramps were added along the final two straightaways.

=== NASCAR ===
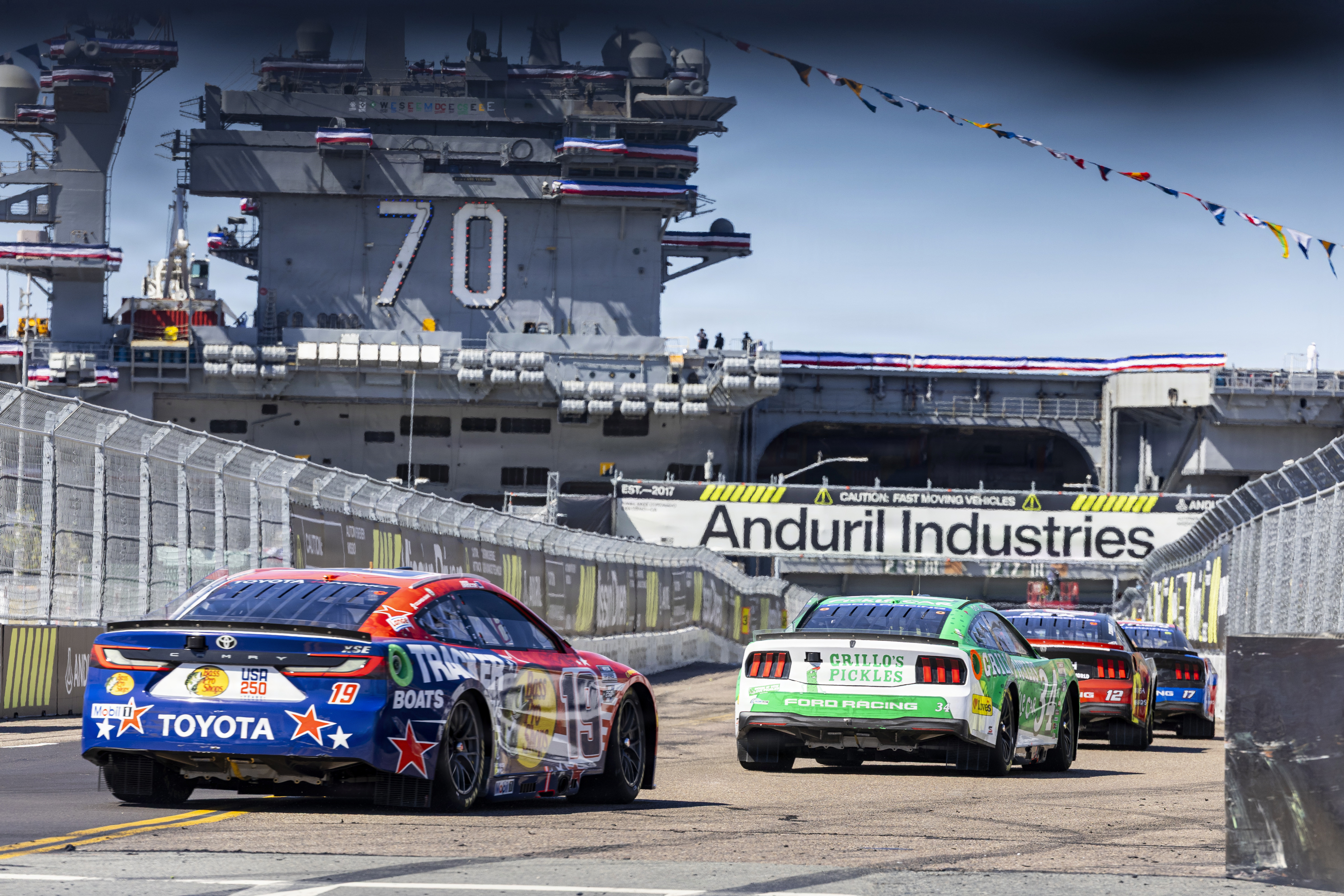
Cup cars, with USS Carl Vinson in the background, racing in 2026

Qualcomm Circuit is 3.400 mi (5.472 km) long with 16 turns, making it the third longest track in NASCAR history. Before the inaugural race, drivers compared the layout to the Chicago Street Course with similar cornering, but found San Diego to be bumpier and had more alternating sections between wide and narrow courses. Fleet Readiness Center Southwest serves as the fan zone and garage.

The lap begins by crossing the "Ellyson Start/Finish Line", named in honor of Commander Theodore G. Ellyson, and into a sweeping right-hand turn. The following straightaway features a slight incline followed by a downhill braking section into back-to-back 90° left turns. The Naval Facilities Engineering Systems Command and Andrew Mills Hall are located along this section, the latter's roof being used for spotters.

A right turn brings cars toward a straight and into turn five, which is located along the aircraft carrier docking station and therefore nicknamed "Carrier Corner". Opposite the docks are storage facilities, the Defense Logistics Agency's printing center, and the headquarters of Amphibious Construction Battalion 1.

After Carrier Corner comes a heavy braking zone into a right-hand turn, where the track narrows into a left turn. The backstretch leads toward the "Coronado Chicane", which has two wide corners akin to the first and last turns at Sebring International Raceway. Military facilities in this section include the campus for the Southwest Regional Apprentice Program along with the hangars for helicopter squadrons HSC-3 and HSC-21. A second spotter's nest is located here atop double-decker buses.

A series of esses and a tight chicane go toward "Runway Road" along the northern tip of Runway 36. Cars go on the runway with "lots of off-throttle time", then the track briefly widens before slowing into a chicane. A final left turn returns to the frontstretch to complete the lap.

== Lap records ==
As of June 2026, the fastest official race lap records at the Coronado Street Circuit are listed as:

Category	Time	Driver	Vehicle	Event
NASCAR Circuit (2026–present): 3.400 mi (5.472 km)
NASCAR Cup	2:12.485	Kevin Magnussen	Chevrolet Camaro ZL1	2026 Anduril 250
NASCAR Truck	2:14.858	Chandler Smith	Ford F-150	2026 Navy 250
NASCAR O'Reilly	2:16.034	Carson Kvapil	Chevrolet Camaro SS	2026 United Rentals Driven to Serve 250

== See also ==
- Anduril 250 Race the Base
- United Rentals Driven to Serve 250
- Navy 250
