= Camp Morena =

US Navy inland training facility in San Diego County, California

Coordinates: 32°42′38″N 116°31′3″W

Camp Morena is an inland training facility of Naval Base Coronado, in the Mountain Empire region of San Diego County, California.

It is located near the town of Campo, to the north of Lake Morena County Park.

Camp Morena was formerly used by the California National Guard, and later given to the U.S. Navy.

== See also ==
- Military facilities in San Diego County, California
