= NASCAR O'Reilly Auto Parts Series at the Coronado Street Course =

NASCAR Xfinity Series race at the

United Rentals Driven to Serve 250

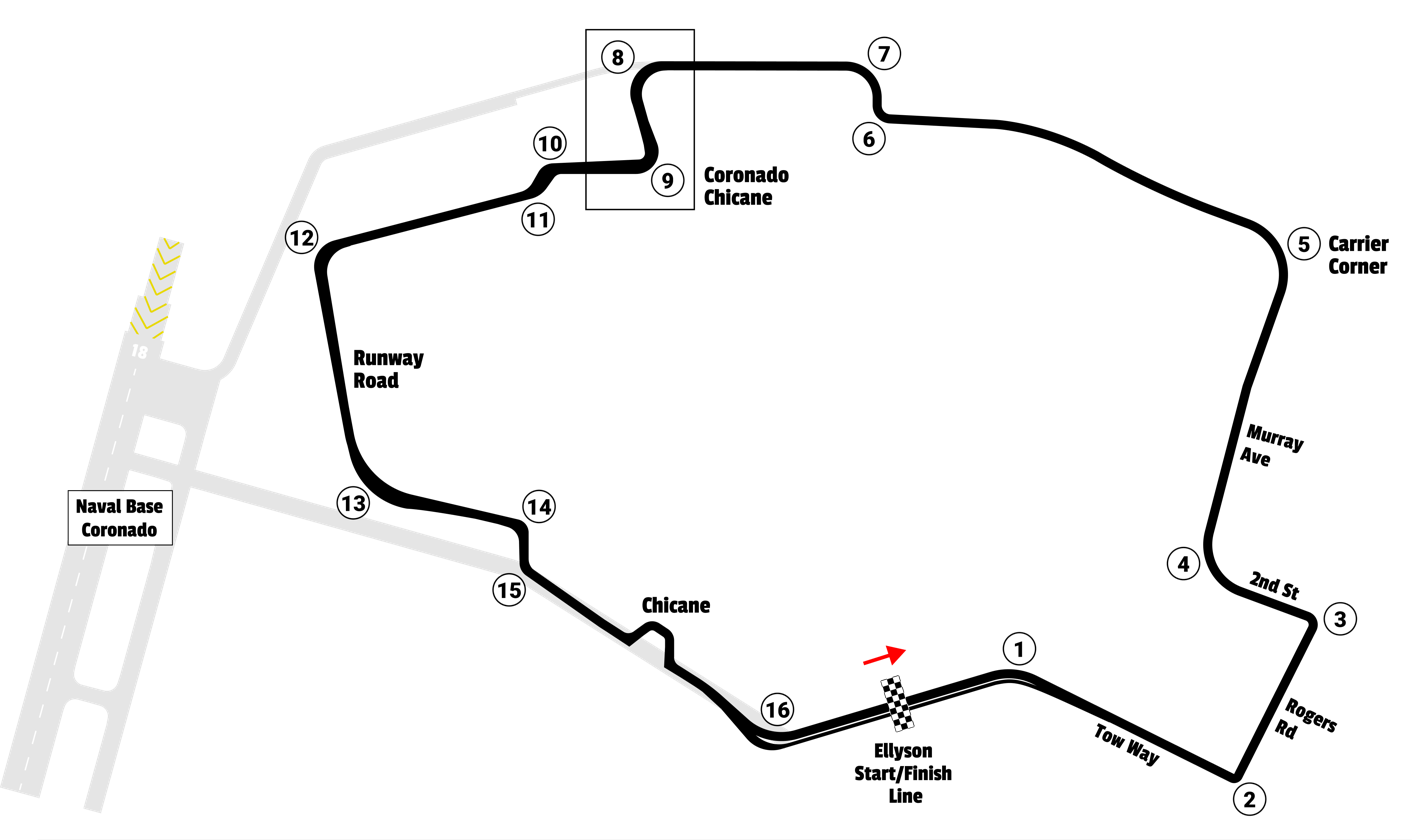

NASCAR O'Reilly Auto Parts Series
- Venue: Coronado Street Course, Naval Base Coronado
- Location: San Diego, California
- Corporate sponsor: United Rentals
- First race: 2026
- Distance: 204 mi (328.306 km)
- Laps: 60; First 2 Stages: 15; Stage 3: 30

Circuit information
- Surface: Asphalt
- Length: 3.4 mi (5.5 km)
- Turns: 16

The United Rentals Driven to Serve 250 is a NASCAR O'Reilly Auto Parts Series race that held on a street circuit in Naval Base Coronado, California starting in 2026. This race is the second street race for the O'Reilly Auto Parts Series. A NASCAR Cup Series race and the NASCAR Craftsman Truck Series race is also held on the street course on the same weekend the days before and after the O'Reilly Auto Parts Series race.

== Background ==
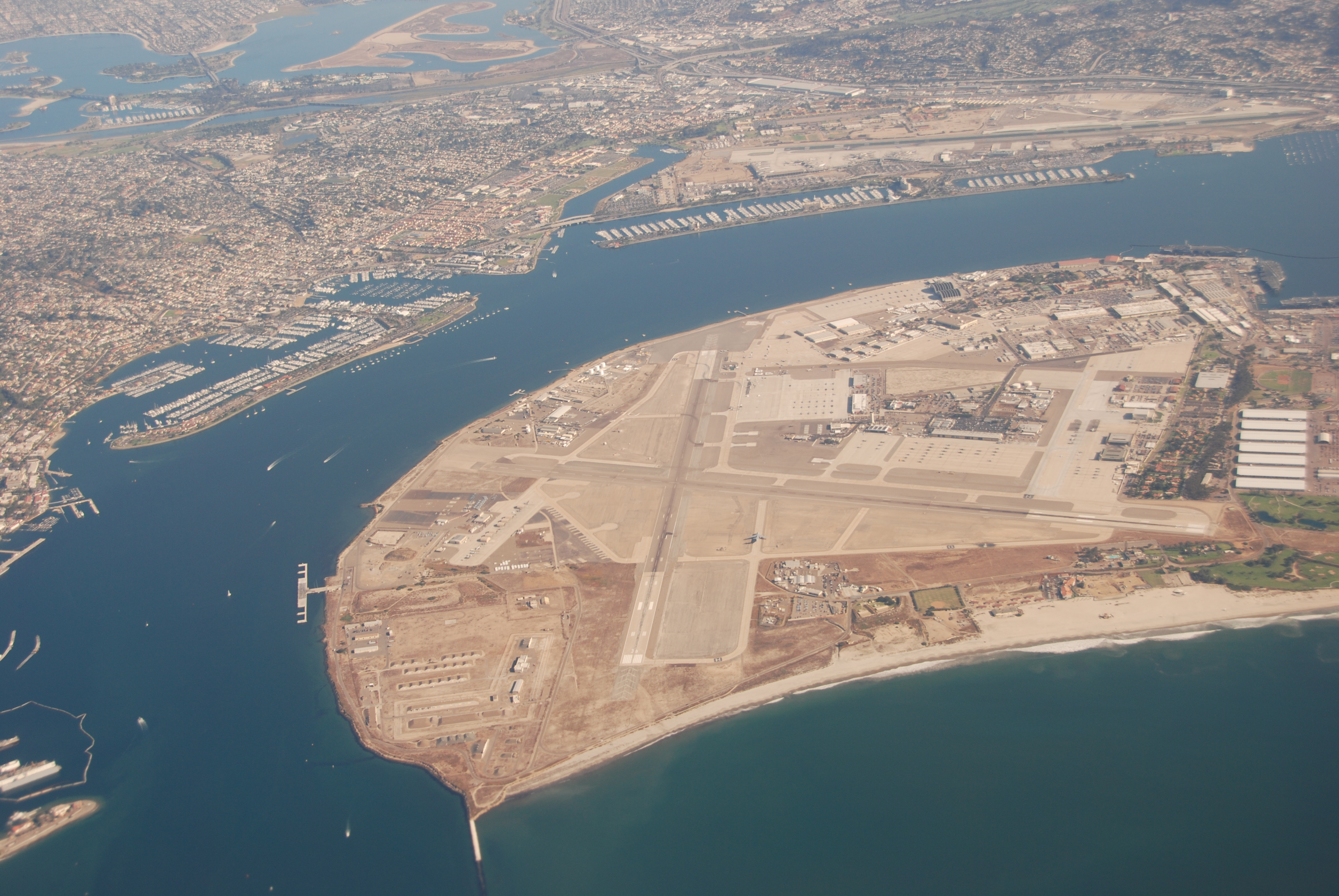
An aerial view of the Naval Air Station North Island element of Naval Base Coronado during 2010

NASCAR has previously held races in the Southern California area for most of its existence, having races at various tracks throughout the 1950s onward, with the addition of Auto Club Speedway to the schedule in 1997 as a superspeedway. It was announced on September 9, 2020, that NASCAR would shorten the track, removing the race following 2023.

Rumors surrounding the Chicago Street Course began after the 2025 race with Chicago's mayor, Brandon Johnson, stating that his administration would like to keep Chicago on the schedule, but after considering changing dates, as the race was held on Independence Day weekend. It was officially announced that the race would be removed following 2025. Other rumors began that NASCAR was looking to hold a street race in the Southern California area as this area was vacant from the schedule. It was officially announced on July 23, 2025, that NASCAR would host a first of its kind street race on the Naval Base Coronado, with the lower national series O'Reilly Auto Parts Series and the Truck Series following suit.

United Rentals was announced as the title sponsor on May 27.

== Past winners ==
| Year | Date | No. | Driver | Team | Manufacturer | Race Distance | | Race Time | Average Speed (mph) | Report | Ref |
| Year | Date | No. | Driver | Team | Manufacturer | Laps | Miles (km) | Race Time | Average Speed (mph) | Report | Ref |
|---|---|---|---|---|---|---|---|---|---|---|---|
| 2026 | June 20 | 21 | Austin Hill | Richard Childress Racing | Chevrolet | 60 | 204 (328.306) | 3:29:54 | 58.313 | Report | |
| 2027 | July 31 | | | | | | | | | Report | |

== See also ==
- NASCAR Cup Series at the Coronado Street Course
- 2026 Navy 250 (NASCAR Truck Series)

| Previous race: Pennzoil 250 | NASCAR O'Reilly Auto Parts Series; United Rentals Driven to Serve 250 | Next race: Food City 300 |
