= NASCAR Cup Series at the Coronado Street Course =

NASCAR Cup Series race at the Naval Base Coronado

Anduril 250

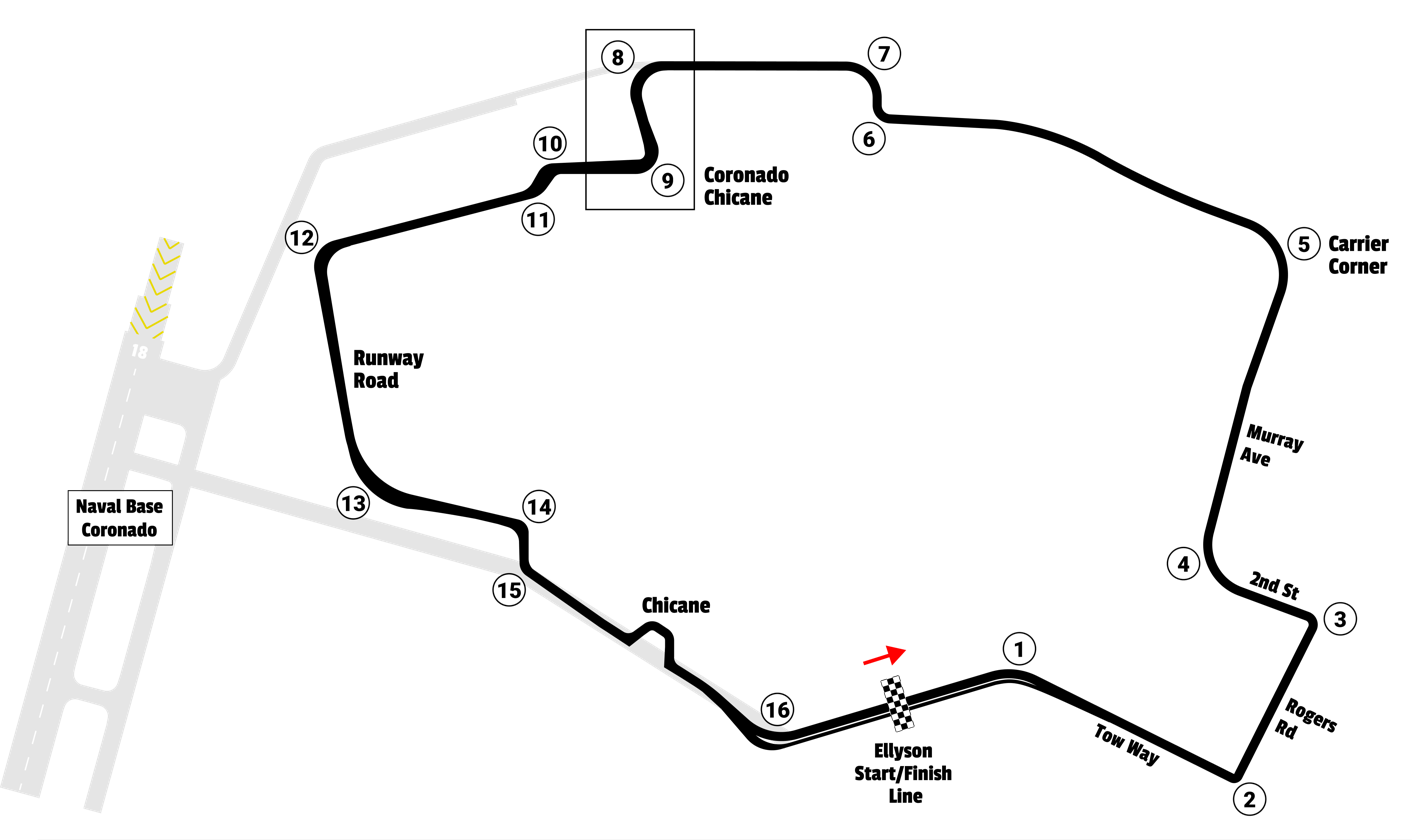

NASCAR Cup Series
- Venue: Coronado Street Course, Naval Base Coronado
- Location: San Diego, California
- Corporate sponsor: Anduril Industries
- First race: 2026
- Distance: 255 mi (410.383 km)
- Laps: 75; Stages 1/2: 20 laps Stage 3: 35

Circuit information
- Surface: Asphalt
- Length: 3.4 mi (5.5 km)
- Turns: 16

The Anduril 250 is a NASCAR Cup Series race held on a street circuit in Naval Air Station North Island starting in 2026. The NASCAR O'Reilly Auto Parts Series and the NASCAR Craftsman Truck Series will also race on the street course on the same weekend the days before the Cup Series race.

== Background ==
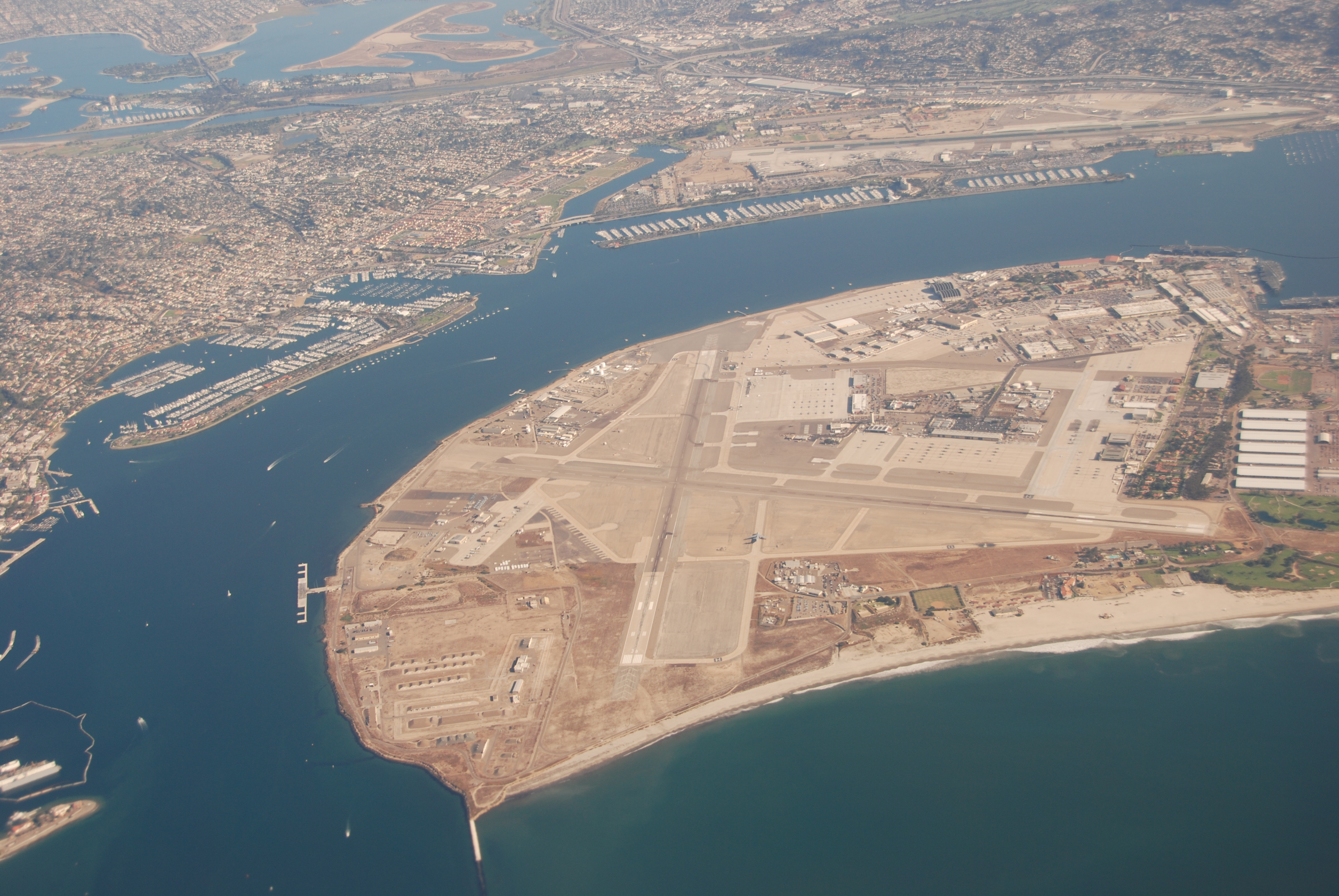
An aerial view of the Naval Air Station North Island element of Naval Base Coronado during 2010

NASCAR has previously held races in the Southern California area for most of its existence, having races at various tracks throughout the 1950s onward. With the addition of Auto Club Speedway to the schedule in 1997, NASCAR found a permanent home for racing in the SoCal area, as the track held one race from 1997 until 2023, and two races from 2004 to 2010. It was announced on September 9, 2020, that NASCAR would look to shorten the track. The COVID-19 pandemic delayed the project until 2023, dropping the race from the 2024 schedule. In 2021, NASCAR announced that its annual pre-season race, the Busch Clash would be held at Los Angeles Memorial Coliseum in 2022. It was removed from the schedule following 2025, when the Clash was moved to Bowman Gray Stadium, leaving the SoCal area.

Rumors surrounding the Chicago Street Course began after the 2025 race with Chicago's mayor, Brandon Johnson, stating that his administration would like to keep Chicago on the schedule, but after considering changing dates, as the race was held on Independence Day weekend. On July 18, 2025, it was announced that the Chicago Street Race would not be featured on the 2026 schedule. Rumors began that NASCAR was looking to hold a street race in the SoCal area, after the removal of the Chicago Street Race. It was officially announced on July 23, 2025, that NASCAR would host a first of its kind street race on the Naval Base Coronado, with the lower national series O'Reilly Auto Parts Series and the Truck Series following suit.

== Past winners ==
Year	Date	No.	Driver	Team	Manufacturer	Race Distance		Race Time	Average Speed (mph)	Report	Ref
Year	Date	No.	Driver	Team	Manufacturer	Laps	Miles (km)	Race Time	Average Speed (mph)	Report	Ref
2026	June 21	67	Corey Heim	23XI Racing	Toyota	75	255 (410.383)	3:36:50	70.561	Report	
2027	August 1									Report	

Previous race: Brickyard 400	NASCAR Cup Series; Anduril 250	Next race: Bass Pro Shops Night Race
