= 2026 Navy 250 =

NASCAR Craftsman Truck Series race at the Coronado Street Course

Race details
- Race 13 of 25 in the 2026 NASCAR Craftsman Truck Series
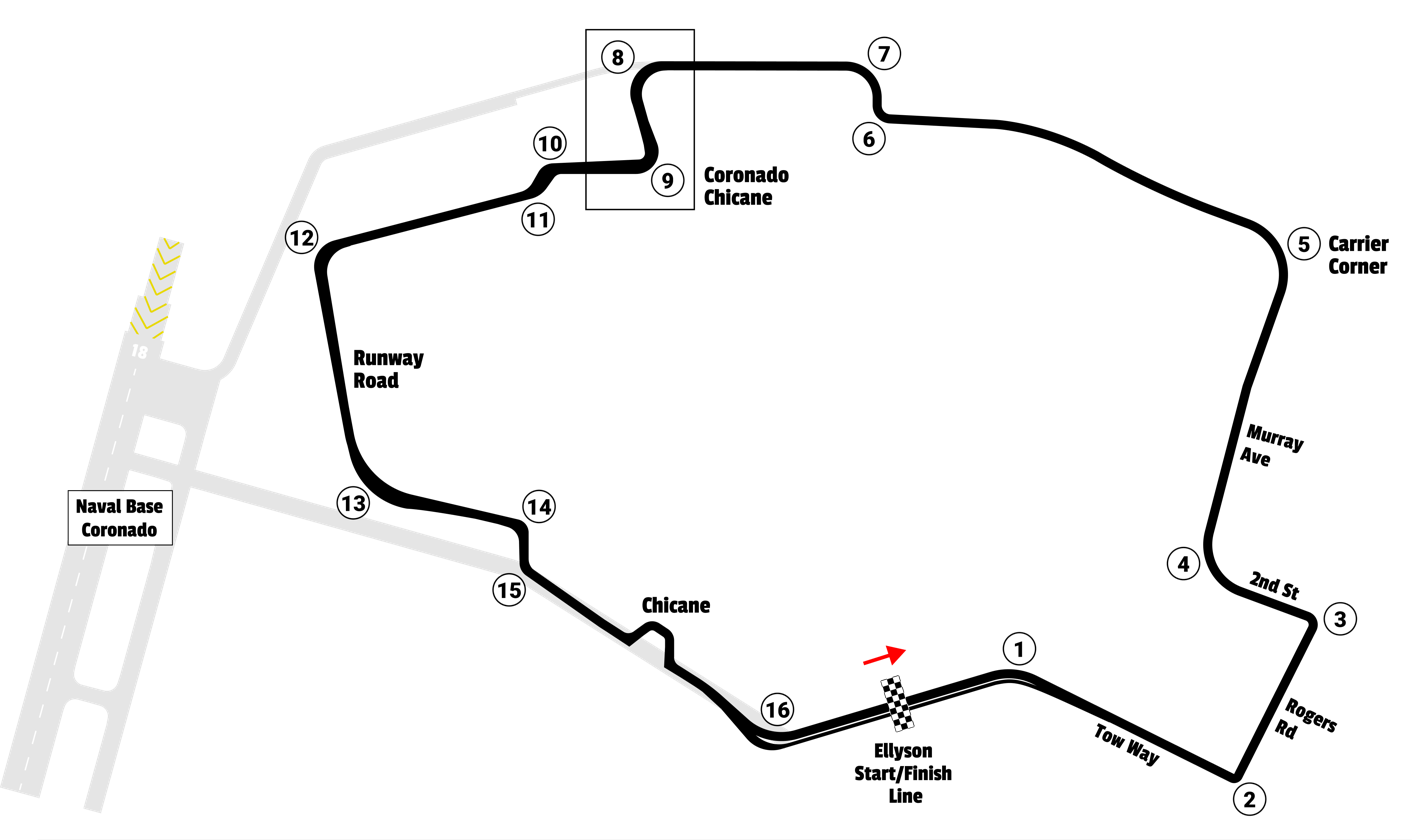
- Date: June 19, 2026
- Location: Qualcomm Circuit (located on Naval Base Coronado) in San Diego, California
- Course: Permanent racing facility
- Course length: 3.4 miles (5.472 km)
- Distance: 53 laps, 180.2 mi (290.004 km)
- Scheduled distance: 50 laps, 170 mi (273.588 km)
- Average speed: 64.274 miles per hour (103.439 km/h)

Pole position
Driver	Kaden Honeycutt	Tricon Garage
- Time: 2:14.782

Most laps led
Driver	Layne Riggs	Front Row Motorsports
- Laps: 21

Fastest lap
Driver	Chandler Smith	Front Row Motorsports
- Time: 2:14.858

Winner
No. 34	Layne Riggs	Front Row Motorsports

Television in the United States
- Network: FS1
- Announcers: Jamie Little, Michael Waltrip, and Kevin Harvick

Radio in the United States
- Radio: NRN
- Booth announcers: Alex Hayden and Todd Gordon
- Turn announcers: Dave Moody (Turns 1–2), Tim Catafalmo (Turns 3–4, 5–8), Kyle Rickey (Turns 9–14), and Dan Hubbard (Turns 15–16)

The 2026 Navy 250 was a NASCAR Craftsman Truck Series one-off race held on Friday, June 19, 2026, at Qualcomm Circuit (located on Naval Base Coronado) in San Diego, California. Contested over 53 laps—extended from 50 laps due to an overtime finish on the 3.4-mile (5.5 km) road course, it was the 13th race of the 2026 NASCAR Craftsman Truck Series season.

In a thrilling finish, Layne Riggs, driving for Front Row Motorsports, took advantage of a mistake from Tyler Reif after he missed the final chicane, sneaking past him and holding off the rest of the field to earn his ninth career NASCAR Craftsman Truck Series win, his fourth of the season, and his third win in the last four races. Reif, who was originally scored in seventh, was given a 30 second time penalty for failing to come to a complete stop after missing the chicane, dropping his final position to 19th. Riggs dominated the majority of the race, winning the first stage and leading a race-high 21 laps. Daniel Hemric finished second, and Kaz Grala finished third. Landen Lewis and Ty Majeski rounded out the top five, while Justin Haley, Brenden Queen, Ben Rhodes, Christian Eckes, and Gio Ruggiero rounded out the top ten.

With a race time of 2 hours, 48 minutes, and 13 seconds, this was the longest Truck Series race in history, surpassing the 2023 O'Reilly Auto Parts 150 at 2 hours, 46 minutes, and 44 seconds.

== Report ==
=== Background ===
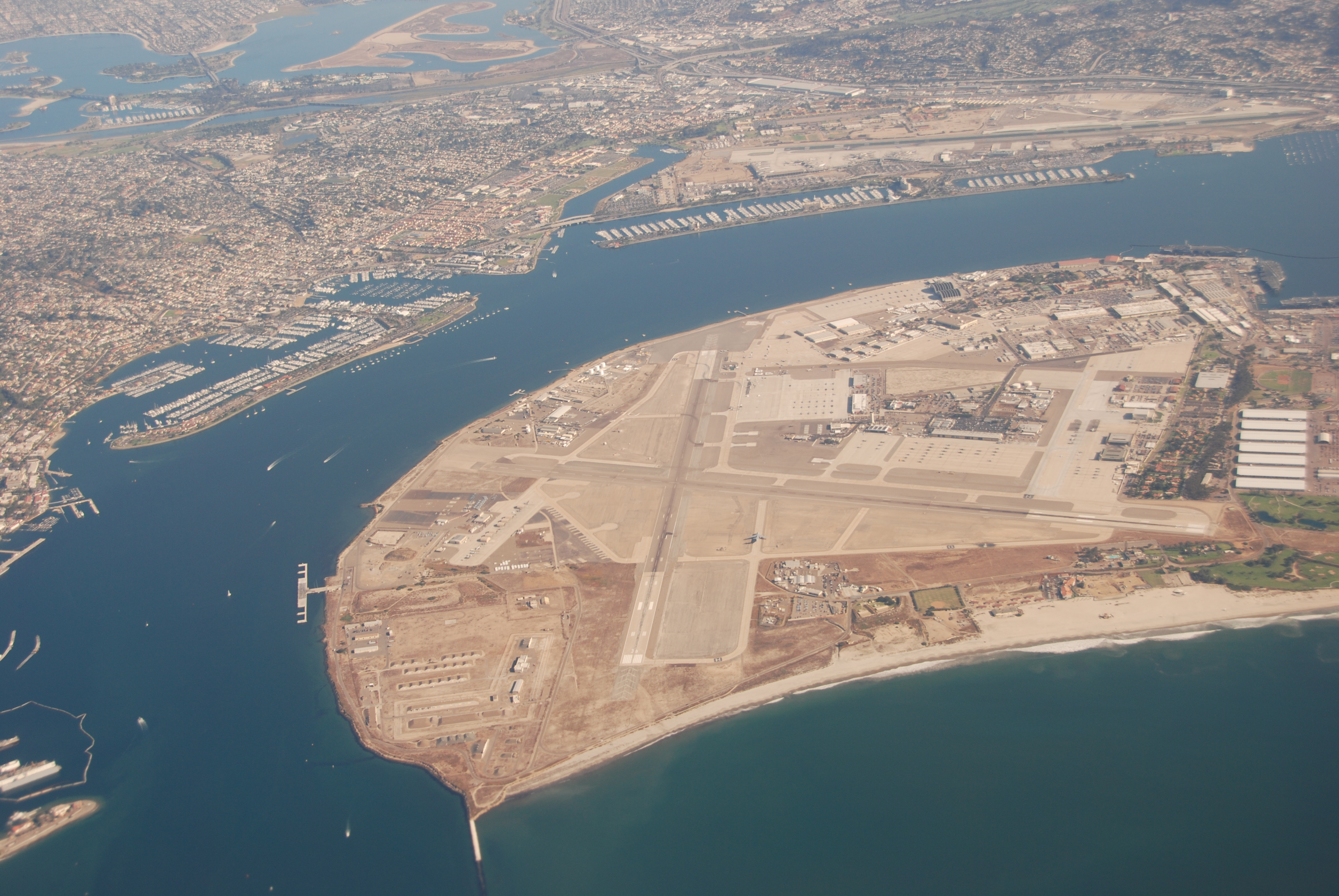
An aerial view of the Naval Air Station North Island element of Naval Base Coronado during 2010

Coronado Street Course (also known as Qualcomm Circuit for sponsorship reasons) is a 3.400 mi (5.472 km) street circuit on Naval Base Coronado (more specifically Naval Air Station North Island) that will host the NASCAR Cup Series, O'Reilly Auto Parts Series and the Truck Series. It previously hosted the Global MX-5 Cup in 2012 and 2013, and Stadium Super Trucks in 2014 as part of Speed Festival, which was also held there between 1997 and 2016.

Rumors began that NASCAR was looking to hold a street race in the SoCal area, after the removal of the Chicago Street Race. It was officially announced on July 23, 2025, that NASCAR would host a first of its kind street race on the Naval Base Coronado, with the lower national series O'Reilly Auto Parts Series and the Truck Series following suit.

This race was held in commemoration of the United States Navy's 250th birthday alongside the country's 250th.

The Cup Series and O'Reilly Auto Parts Series was announced to return in 2027 for their respective series without the Truck Series.

==== Entry list ====
- (R) denotes rookie driver.
- (i) denotes driver who is ineligible for series driver points.

#	Driver	Team	Make
1	Jimmie Johnson (i)	Tricon Garage	Toyota
2	Jackson Lee	Team Reaume	Ford
5	Adam Andretti	Tricon Garage	Toyota
7	Connor Mosack	Spire Motorsports	Chevrolet
9	Grant Enfinger	CR7 Motorsports	Chevrolet
10	Corey LaJoie	Kaulig Racing	Ram
11	Kaden Honeycutt	Tricon Garage	Toyota
12	Brenden Queen (R)	Kaulig Racing	Ram
13	Cole Butcher (R)	ThorSport Racing	Ford
14	Mini Tyrrell (R)	Kaulig Racing	Ram
15	Tanner Gray	Tricon Garage	Toyota
16	Justin Haley	Kaulig Racing	Ram
17	Gio Ruggiero	Tricon Garage	Toyota
18	Tyler Ankrum	McAnally–Hilgemann Racing	Chevrolet
19	Daniel Hemric	McAnally–Hilgemann Racing	Chevrolet
20	Brendan Gaughan	McAnally–Hilgemann Racing	Chevrolet
22	Austin Varco	Team Reaume	Ford
25	Jamie McMurray	Kaulig Racing	Ram
26	Dawson Sutton	Rackley W.A.R.	Chevrolet
33	Frankie Muniz	Team Reaume	Ford
34	Layne Riggs	Front Row Motorsports	Ford
38	Chandler Smith	Front Row Motorsports	Ford
42	Tyler Reif	Niece Motorsports	Chevrolet
44	Andrés Pérez de Lara	Niece Motorsports	Chevrolet
45	Landen Lewis	Niece Motorsports	Chevrolet
52	Stewart Friesen	Halmar Friesen Racing	Toyota
62	Kaz Grala	Halmar Friesen Racing	Toyota
75	Parker Kligerman	Henderson Motorsports	Chevrolet
76	Nathan Nicholson	Freedom Racing Enterprises	Chevrolet
77	Justin Marks	Spire Motorsports	Chevrolet
81	Kris Wright	McAnally–Hilgemann Racing	Chevrolet
88	Ty Majeski	ThorSport Racing	Ford
91	Christian Eckes	McAnally–Hilgemann Racing	Chevrolet
98	Jake Garcia	ThorSport Racing	Ford
99	Ben Rhodes	ThorSport Racing	Ford
Official entry list

== Practice ==
=== First practice ===
The first practice session was held on Friday, June 19, at 9:00 AM PST, and lasted for 40 minutes.

Layne Riggs, driving for Front Row Motorsports, set the fastest time in the session, with a lap of 2:17.220 seconds, and a speed of 89.200 miles per hour (143.553 km/h).

Pos.	#	Driver	Team	Make	Time	Speed
1	34	Layne Riggs	Front Row Motorsports	Ford	2:17.220	89.200
2	11	Kaden Honeycutt	Tricon Garage	Toyota	2:17.375	89.099
3	38	Chandler Smith	Front Row Motorsports	Ford	2:18.536	88.353
Full first practice results

=== Final practice ===
The second and final practice session was held on Friday, June 19, at 10:00 AM PST, and lasted for 40 minutes.

Kaden Honeycutt, driving for Tricon Garage, set the fastest time in the session, with a lap of 2:16.323 seconds, and a speed of 89.787 miles per hour (144.498 km/h).

Pos.	#	Driver	Team	Make	Time	Speed
1	11	Kaden Honeycutt	Tricon Garage	Toyota	2:16.323	89.787
2	38	Chandler Smith	Front Row Motorsports	Ford	2:17.804	88.822
3	75	Parker Kligerman	Henderson Motorsports	Chevrolet	2:18.532	88.355
Full final practice results

== Qualifying ==
Qualifying was held on Friday, June 19, at 11:00 AM PST. Since Qualcomm Circuit has a road course layout, the qualifying procedure used was a two-group system with one round. Drivers were separated into two groups, A and B. Each driver had multiple laps to set a time. Whoever sets the fastest time between both groups won the pole.

Under a 2021 rule change, the timing line in road course qualifying is "not" the start-finish line. Instead, the timing line for qualifying was set at the exit of Turn 15 before the chicane. Kaden Honeycutt, driving for Tricon Garage, qualified on pole position with a lap of 2:14.782 seconds, and a speed of 90.813 miles per hour (146.149 km/h).

No drivers failed to qualify.

=== Qualifying results ===
Pos.	#	Driver	Team	Make	Time	Speed
1	11	Kaden Honeycutt	Tricon Garage	Toyota	2:14.782	90.813
2	34	Layne Riggs	Front Row Motorsports	Ford	2:15.196	90.535
3	38	Chandler Smith	Front Row Motorsports	Ford	2:16.231	89.847
4	1	Jimmie Johnson (i)	Tricon Garage	Toyota	2:16.400	89.736
5	9	Grant Enfinger	CR7 Motorsports	Chevrolet	2:16.555	89.634
6	17	Gio Ruggiero	Tricon Garage	Toyota	2:16.620	89.592
7	44	Andrés Pérez de Lara	Niece Motorsports	Chevrolet	2:16.729	89.520
8	88	Ty Majeski	ThorSport Racing	Ford	2:16.732	89.518
9	45	Landen Lewis	Niece Motorsports	Chevrolet	2:17.065	89.301
10	75	Parker Kligerman	Henderson Motorsports	Chevrolet	2:17.130	89.258
11	7	Connor Mosack	Spire Motorsports	Chevrolet	2:17.206	89.209
12	18	Tyler Ankrum	McAnally–Hilgemann Racing	Chevrolet	2:17.250	89.180
13	99	Ben Rhodes	ThorSport Racing	Ford	2:17.343	89.120
14	42	Tyler Reif	Niece Motorsports	Chevrolet	2:17.403	89.081
15	10	Corey LaJoie	Kaulig Racing	Ram	2:18.165	88.590
16	62	Kaz Grala	Halmar Friesen Racing	Toyota	2:18.198	88.569
17	16	Justin Haley	Kaulig Racing	Ram	2:18.552	88.342
18	26	Dawson Sutton	Rackley W.A.R.	Chevrolet	2:19.192	87.936
19	98	Jake Garcia	ThorSport Racing	Ford	2:19.333	87.847
20	76	Nathan Nicholson	Freedom Racing Enterprises	Chevrolet	2:19.527	87.725
21	25	Jamie McMurray	Kaulig Racing	Ram	2:19.827	87.537
22	52	Stewart Friesen	Halmar Friesen Racing	Toyota	2:20.476	87.132
23	14	Mini Tyrrell (R)	Kaulig Racing	Ram	2:20.791	86.937
24	81	Kris Wright	McAnally–Hilgemann Racing	Chevrolet	2:21.115	86.738
25	13	Cole Butcher (R)	ThorSport Racing	Ford	2:21.395	86.566
26	2	Jackson Lee	Team Reaume	Ford	2:22.363	85.977
27	33	Frankie Muniz	Team Reaume	Ford	2:23.121	85.522
28	20	Brendan Gaughan	McAnally–Hilgemann Racing	Chevrolet	2:24.173	84.898
29	22	Austin Varco	Team Reaume	Ford	2:24.318	84.813
30	91	Christian Eckes	McAnally–Hilgemann Racing	Chevrolet	—	—
31	77	Justin Marks	Spire Motorsports	Chevrolet	—	—
Qualified by owner's points
32	19	Daniel Hemric	McAnally–Hilgemann Racing	Chevrolet	—	—
33	5	Adam Andretti	Tricon Garage	Toyota	—	—
34	12	Brenden Queen (R)	Kaulig Racing	Ram	—	—
35	15	Tanner Gray	Tricon Garage	Toyota	—	—
Official qualifying results
Official starting lineup

== Race ==
=== Race results ===
==== Stage Results ====
Stage One Laps: 12

Pos.	#	Driver	Team	Make	Pts
1	34	Layne Riggs	Front Row Motorsports	Ford	10
2	11	Kaden Honeycutt	Tricon Garage	Toyota	9
3	1	Jimmie Johnson (i)	Tricon Garage	Toyota	0
4	38	Chandler Smith	Front Row Motorsports	Ford	7
5	9	Grant Enfinger	CR7 Motorsports	Chevrolet	6
6	18	Tyler Ankrum	McAnally–Hilgemann Racing	Chevrolet	5
7	99	Ben Rhodes	ThorSport Racing	Ford	4
8	44	Andrés Pérez de Lara	Niece Motorsports	Chevrolet	3
9	45	Landen Lewis	Niece Motorsports	Chevrolet	2
10	42	Tyler Reif	Niece Motorsports	Chevrolet	1

Stage Two Laps: 12

Pos.	#	Driver	Team	Make	Pts
1	75	Parker Kligerman	Henderson Motorsports	Chevrolet	10
2	88	Ty Majeski	ThorSport Racing	Ford	9
3	9	Grant Enfinger	CR7 Motorsports	Chevrolet	8
4	18	Tyler Ankrum	McAnally–Hilgemann Racing	Chevrolet	7
5	44	Andrés Pérez de Lara	Niece Motorsports	Chevrolet	6
6	42	Tyler Reif	Niece Motorsports	Chevrolet	5
7	38	Chandler Smith	Front Row Motorsports	Ford	4
8	11	Kaden Honeycutt	Tricon Garage	Toyota	3
9	1	Jimmie Johnson (i)	Tricon Garage	Toyota	0
10	91	Christian Eckes	McAnally–Hilgemann Racing	Chevrolet	1

=== Final Stage Results ===
Stage Three Laps: 29

Fin	St	#	Driver	Team	Make	Laps	Led	Status	Pts
1	2	34	Layne Riggs	Front Row Motorsports	Ford	53	21	Running	65
2	32	19	Daniel Hemric	McAnally–Hilgemann Racing	Chevrolet	53	0	Running	35
3	16	62	Kaz Grala	Halmar Friesen Racing	Toyota	53	0	Running	34
4	9	45	Landen Lewis	Niece Motorsports	Chevrolet	53	0	Running	35
5	8	88	Ty Majeski	ThorSport Racing	Ford	53	0	Running	41
6	17	16	Justin Haley	Kaulig Racing	Ram	53	0	Running	31
7	34	12	Brenden Queen (R)	Kaulig Racing	Ram	53	0	Running	30
8	13	99	Ben Rhodes	ThorSport Racing	Ford	53	0	Running	33
9	30	91	Christian Eckes	McAnally–Hilgemann Racing	Chevrolet	53	0	Running	29
10	6	17	Gio Ruggiero	Tricon Garage	Toyota	53	0	Running	27
11	23	14	Mini Tyrrell (R)	Kaulig Racing	Ram	53	0	Running	26
12	35	15	Tanner Gray	Tricon Garage	Toyota	53	0	Running	25
13	24	81	Kris Wright	McAnally–Hilgemann Racing	Chevrolet	53	0	Running	24
14	33	5	Adam Andretti	Tricon Garage	Toyota	53	0	Running	23
15	25	13	Cole Butcher (R)	ThorSport Racing	Ford	53	0	Running	22
16	28	20	Brendan Gaughan	McAnally–Hilgemann Racing	Chevrolet	53	0	Running	21
17	29	22	Austin Varco	Team Reaume	Ford	53	0	Running	20
18	10	75	Parker Kligerman	Henderson Motorsports	Chevrolet	53	6	Running	29
19	14	42	Tyler Reif	Niece Motorsports	Chevrolet	53	1	Running	24
20	27	33	Frankie Muniz	Team Reaume	Ford	53	0	Running	17
21	7	44	Andrés Pérez de Lara	Niece Motorsports	Chevrolet	53	0	Running	25
22	3	38	Chandler Smith	Front Row Motorsports	Ford	53	13	Running	27
23	1	11	Kaden Honeycutt	Tricon Garage	Toyota	52	10	Accident	26
24	11	7	Connor Mosack	Spire Motorsports	Chevrolet	52	0	Running	13
25	31	77	Justin Marks	Spire Motorsports	Chevrolet	51	0	Running	12
26	18	26	Dawson Sutton	Rackley W.A.R.	Chevrolet	51	0	Running	11
27	26	2	Jackson Lee	Team Reaume	Ford	50	0	Running	10
28	20	76	Nathan Nicholson	Freedom Racing Enterprises	Chevrolet	48	0	Accident	9
29	5	9	Grant Enfinger	CR7 Motorsports	Chevrolet	48	0	Running	22
30	4	1	Jimmie Johnson (i)	Tricon Garage	Toyota	47	2	Electrical	0
31	12	18	Tyler Ankrum	McAnally–Hilgemann Racing	Chevrolet	46	0	Accident	18
32	19	98	Jake Garcia	ThorSport Racing	Ford	40	0	Transmission	5
33	22	52	Stewart Friesen	Halmar Friesen Racing	Toyota	29	0	Power	4
34	21	25	Jamie McMurray	Kaulig Racing	Ram	22	0	Accident	3
35	15	10	Corey LaJoie	Kaulig Racing	Ram	14	0	Accident	2
Official race results

=== Race statistics ===
- Lead changes: 16 among 6 different drivers
- Cautions/Laps: 7 for 13 laps
- Red flags: 1
- Time of race: 2 hours, 48 minutes and 13 second
- Average speed: 64.274 miles per hour (103.439 km/h)

== Standings after the race ==
Drivers' Championship standings

	Pos	Driver	Points
	1	Layne Riggs	562
	2	Kaden Honeycutt	497 (–65)
	3	Chandler Smith	434 (–128)
	4	Gio Ruggiero	410 (–152)
	5	Christian Eckes	408 (–154)
1	6	Ty Majeski	353 (–209)
1	7	Ben Rhodes	349 (–213)
1	8	Daniel Hemric	313 (–214)
1	9	Tyler Ankrum	301 (–261)
	10	Jake Garcia	283 (–279)
Official driver's standings

Manufacturers' Championship standings

Pos	Manufacturer	Points
1	Toyota	543
2	Ford	534 (–9)
3	Chevrolet	503 (–40)
4	Ram	351 (–192)

- Note: Only the first 10 positions are included for the driver standings.

Previous race: 2026 DQS Solutions & Staffing 250	NASCAR Craftsman Truck Series; 2026 season	Next race: 2026 LiUNA! 150
