= Naval Base Coronado =

Group of US Navy installations around San Diego, California

- San Diego County, California in the United States
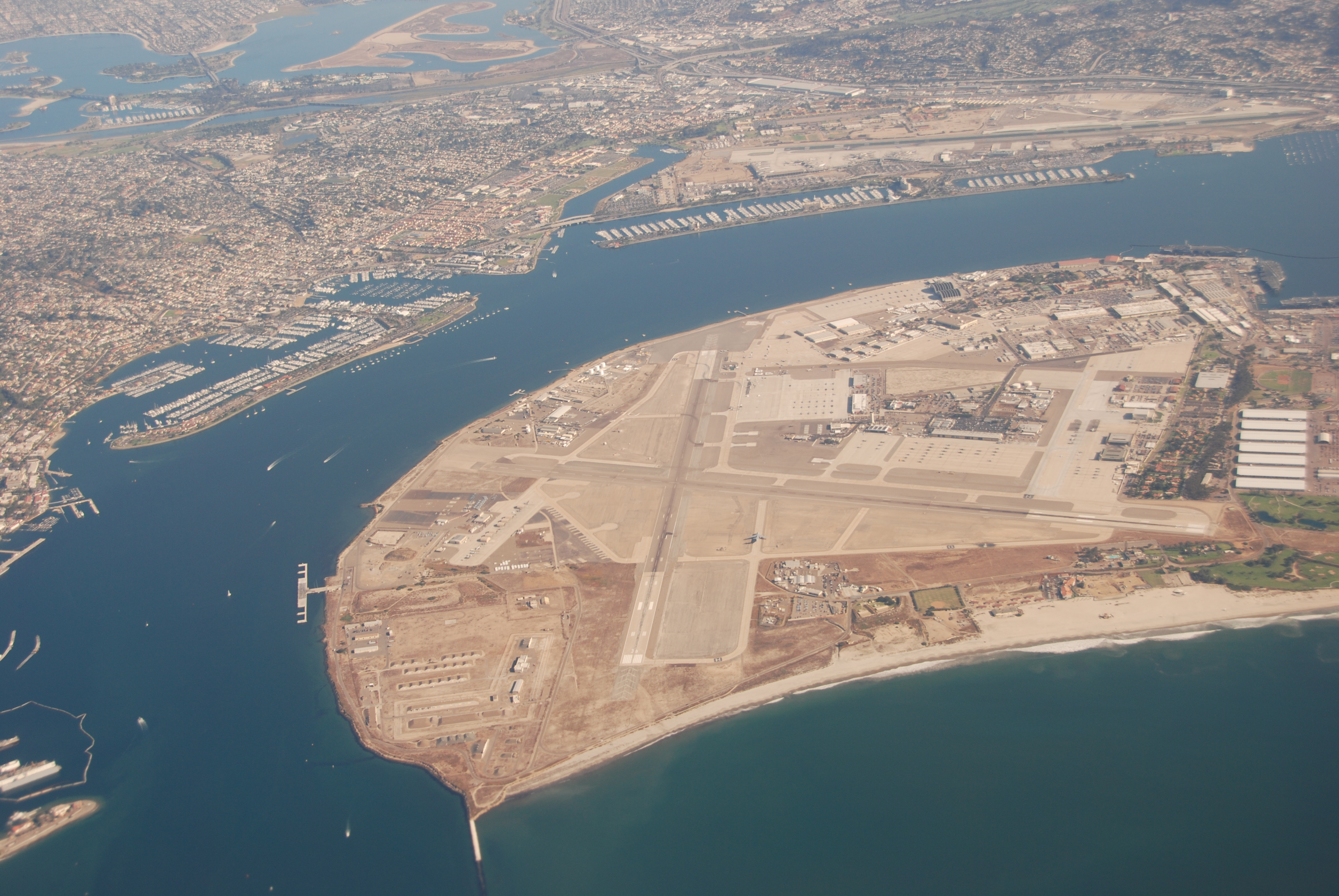
- An aerial view of the Naval Air Station North Island element of Naval Base Coronado during 2010

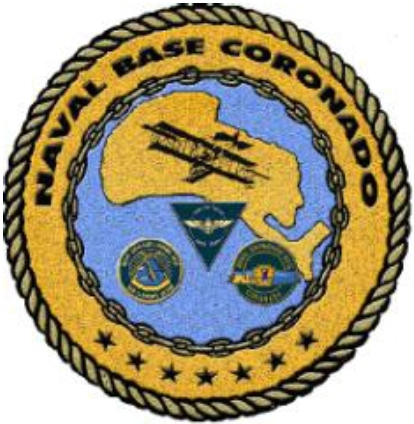

Site information
- Type: Naval base
- Owner: Department of Defense
- Operator: US Navy
- Controlled by: Navy Region Southwest
- Condition: Operational
- Website: Official website

Location
- Location within California Location within the United States
- Coordinates: 32°41′57″N 117°12′55″W (NAS North Island – anchor base)

Site history
- In use: 1997 – present (as merged base)

Garrison information
- Current commander: Captain Newt McKissick

Naval Base Coronado (NBC) is a consolidated Navy installation encompassing eight military facilities in southern California, stretching from San Clemente Island, located 70 miles west of San Diego, to Mountain Warfare Training Camp Michael Monsoor and Camp Morena, located 60 miles east of San Diego.

== Organization ==
In 1997, Naval Base Coronado was created, incorporating eight separate naval installations under one commanding officer. Those facilities include: Naval Air Station North Island (NASNI); Naval Amphibious Base Coronado (NAB); Naval Outlying Landing Field Imperial Beach (NOLFIB); Naval Auxiliary Landing Field San Clemente Island (NALFSCI); Silver Strand Training Complex (SSTC), formerly known as the Naval Radio Receiving Facility; Mountain Warfare Training Camp Michael Monsoor (MWTCMM); Camp Morena; and the Remote Training Site, Warner Springs (RTSWS).

These eight facilities encompass more than 57,000 acres (230 km^{2}) and make NBC the largest command in the southwest region of the U.S.

Employing over 36,000 military and civilian personnel, NBC accounts for over 30% of the region's total workforce, and has the largest workforce in San Diego County.

Street circuits have been built on the base for auto racing, creating the Coronado Street Course. The runways and taxiways hosted the Coronado Speed Festival from 1997 to 2016. A larger 3.4-mile (5.5 km) track was used for NASCAR starting in 2026.

== Bases ==
Naval Air Station North Island (32°41′57″N 117°12′55″W)
NASNI is located at the north end of Coronado Island in San Diego Bay and is the home port of several aircraft carriers of the United States Navy. The installation also hosts nearly all of the Pacific Fleet's helicopter squadrons, several fixed-wing squadrons, multiple Naval Air Reserve activities and is home to both the Fleet Readiness Center Southwest (formerly Naval Aviation Depot North Island) and the headquarters for Commander, Naval Air Forces. It is part of the largest aerospace-industrial complex in the United States Navy, the 57,000-acre (230 km^{2}) Naval Base Coronado in San Diego County, California.
Naval Amphibious Base Coronado (32°40′31″N 117°9′38″W)
NAB is a major shore command, supporting 27 tenant commands, and is the West Coast focal point for special and expeditionary warfare training and operations. The on base population is 5,000 military personnel (including Reserve personnel) and 7,000 military student personnel.
Naval Outlying Landing Field Imperial Beach (32°33′48″N 117°06′42″W)
Formerly known as Naval Air Station Imperial Beach, NOLF IB is a facility for helicopters, situated on 1,204 acres (5 km^{2}) approximately 14 miles (23 km) south of San Diego and within the city limits of Imperial Beach, California. It is referred to locally as "Ream Field." It is known as "The Helicopter Capital of the World".
Naval Auxiliary Landing Field San Clemente Island (33°01′22″N 118°35′19″W)
SCI, also known as "Frederick Sherman Field", is a military airport located on San Clemente Island.
Silver Strand Training Complex (32°35′47″N 117°07′41″W)
SSTC, located between Imperial Beach and Coronado is the premier training facility for the U.S. Military special forces.
SERE Training Facility Warner Springs (33°18′27″N 116°38′42″W)
Survival, Evasion, Resistance, and Escape (SERE) training for U.S. Navy and U.S. Marine Corps flight crews, Naval Special Warfare, Marine Corps Force Recon and Marine Corps Special Operations personnel is conducted at the U.S. Navy's training site in Warner Springs, located in the Cleveland National Forest. The facility is one of two such facilities in the U.S. Navy, with an east coast counterpart facility located in Maine. It is in a remote area near the community of Warner Springs in the northeastern San Diego County, at an elevation of about 3200 feet. The Camp consist of a headquarters area with an administrative building, several staff barracks building, a wastewater treatment plant, and a training compound.
Camp Michael Monsoor Mountain Warfare Training Facility (32°40′04″N 116°26′14″W)
MWTF, formerly known as the La Posta Mountain Warfare Training Facility, located 50 miles east of San Diego, near the city of Campo, in San Diego County, is a 1,063 acres (4 km^{2}) training facility used by the Naval Special Warfare Center.
Camp Morena (32°42′38″N 116°31′3″W)
Located north of Lake Morena County Park, near Campo, San Diego County, California.

== Swastika-shaped barracks ==
A barracks building on the Naval Amphibious Base (32.67657°N 117.15827°W) resembles a swastika symbol from the air. This was realized shortly after the 1967 groundbreaking, but no action was taken as the building was in a no-fly zone that would not be seen by passengers of commercial airlines. In 2007, members of the public noticed the shape in aerial views of Google Earth and the Navy announced plans to spend $600,000 on “camouflage” landscaping and rooftop adjustments.
