= Chicago Street Race =

Chicago Street Race may refer to two races held on the Chicago Street Course:

- Grant Park 165, the Cup Series race held on the Sunday of July 4th weekend
- The Loop 110, the Xfinity Series race held on the Saturday of July 4th weekend
