= 2025 The Loop 110 =

18th race of the 2025 NASCAR Xfinity Series

Race details
- Race 18 of 33 of the 2025 NASCAR Xfinity Series
- Date: July 5, 2025
- Official name: 3rd Annual The Loop 110
- Location: Chicago Street Course in Chicago, Illinois
- Course: Permanent racing facility
- Course length: 2.2 miles (3.5 km)
- Distance: 50 laps, 110 mi (177 km)

Pole position
Driver	Shane van Gisbergen	JR Motorsports
- Time: 1:30.085

Most laps led
Driver	Shane van Gisbergen	JR Motorsports
- Laps: 27

Winner
No. 9	Shane van Gisbergen	JR Motorsports

Television in the United States
- Network: The CW
- Announcers: Adam Alexander, A. J. Allmendinger, Parker Kligerman

Radio in the United States
- Radio: MRN

The 2025 The Loop 110 was the 18th stock car race of the 2025 NASCAR Xfinity Series, and the 3rd iteration of the event. The race was held on Saturday, July 5, 2025, at the Chicago Street Course in Chicago, Illinois, a 2.2 miles (3.5 km) street course. The race took the scheduled 50 laps to complete.

Shane van Gisbergen, driving for JR Motorsports, would make an aggressive pass on teammate Connor Zilisch in turn 1 with two laps to go to earn his fourth career NASCAR Xfinity Series win, and his first of the season. To fill out the podium, Sheldon Creed, driving for Haas Factory Team, would finish in 3rd, respectively.

Despite winning the pole, van Gisbergen experienced several setbacks during the race. His cool suit had malfunctioned, which physically took a toll on him. He was later treated and released from the infield care center after the race. van Gisbergen's car also had a balky carburetor, and he decided to stay out at the end of stage one while everyone else pitted for tires and fuel.

== Report ==
=== Background ===
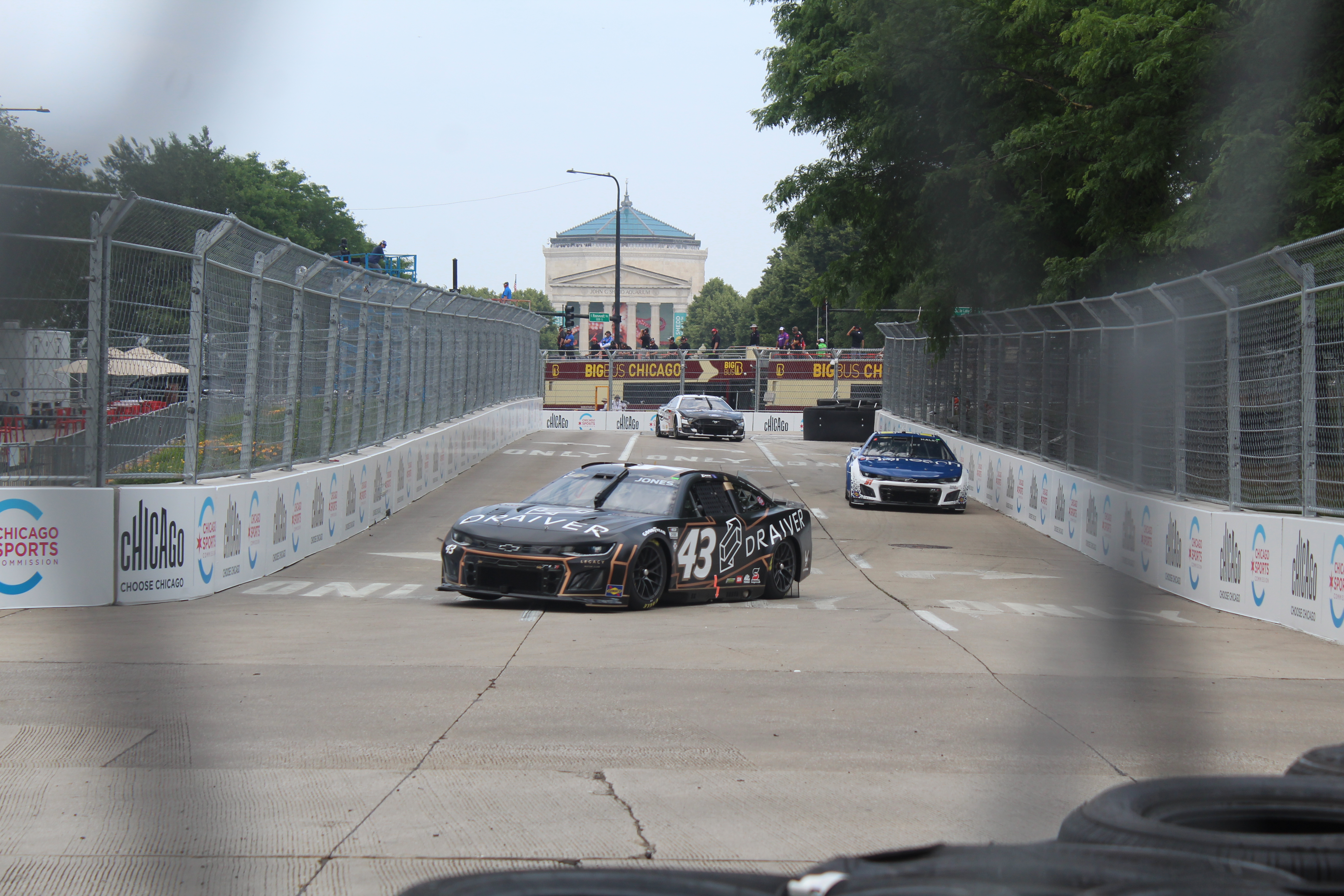
The Chicago Street Course, the circuit where the race will be held.

The Chicago Street Course is a 2.2 mi (3.5 km) street circuit located in the city of Chicago, Illinois, United States. It hosts the NASCAR Cup Series and NASCAR Xfinity Series. The track was initially a conceptual track on iRacing made for the eNASCAR iRacing Pro Invitational Series in 2021.

The track for the actual race in 2023 ended up being the exact same layout as the version used in 2021 for the eNASCAR iRacing Pro Invitational Series. The start/finish line is located on South Columbus Drive in front of Buckingham Fountain in Grant Park. The cars will go south and then turn left onto East Balbo Drive and then right onto South Lake Shore Drive (also part of U.S. Route 41), which is alongside Lake Michigan. The cars will then turn right onto East Roosevelt Road and then make another right, which gets them back onto South Columbus Drive where they are going north. They will then reach the intersection of South Columbus Drive and East Balbo Drive again and will make a left turn. When they are back on East Balbo Drive, they will cross a bridge over the Metra Electric District tracks. Next, the cars will turn right onto South Michigan Avenue and go north, go onto East Congress Plaza Drive and back onto South Michigan Ave. Lastly, they will make a right turn onto East Jackson Drive, go back across the Metra Electric tracks, and right back onto South Columbus Drive to the start/finish line.

On October 20, 2023, NASCAR announced that the Xfinity Series Chicago Street Race would be shortened from 121 miles (194 km) and 55 laps to 110 miles (177 km) and 50 laps.

==== Entry list ====
- (R) denotes rookie driver.
- (i) denotes driver who is ineligible for series driver points.

#	Driver	Team	Make
00	Sheldon Creed	Haas Factory Team	Ford
1	Carson Kvapil (R)	JR Motorsports	Chevrolet
2	Jesse Love	Richard Childress Racing	Chevrolet
4	Parker Retzlaff	Alpha Prime Racing	Chevrolet
5	Kris Wright	Our Motorsports	Chevrolet
07	Alex Labbé	SS-Green Light Racing	Chevrolet
7	Justin Allgaier	JR Motorsports	Chevrolet
8	Sammy Smith	JR Motorsports	Chevrolet
9	Shane van Gisbergen (i)	JR Motorsports	Chevrolet
10	Daniel Dye (R)	Kaulig Racing	Chevrolet
11	Josh Williams	Kaulig Racing	Chevrolet
14	Connor Mosack (i)	SS-Green Light Racing	Chevrolet
16	Christian Eckes (R)	Kaulig Racing	Chevrolet
18	William Sawalich (R)	Joe Gibbs Racing	Toyota
19	Jack Perkins	Joe Gibbs Racing	Toyota
20	Brandon Jones	Joe Gibbs Racing	Toyota
21	Austin Hill	Richard Childress Racing	Chevrolet
24	Kaz Grala (i)	Sam Hunt Racing	Toyota
25	Harrison Burton	AM Racing	Ford
26	Dean Thompson (R)	Sam Hunt Racing	Toyota
27	Jeb Burton	Jordan Anderson Racing	Chevrolet
28	Kyle Sieg	RSS Racing	Ford
31	Blaine Perkins	Jordan Anderson Racing	Chevrolet
32	Austin Green	Jordan Anderson Racing	Chevrolet
35	Andre Castro	Joey Gase Motorsports	Chevrolet
39	Ryan Sieg	RSS Racing	Ford
41	Sam Mayer	Haas Factory Team	Ford
42	Anthony Alfredo	Young's Motorsports	Chevrolet
44	Brennan Poole	Alpha Prime Racing	Chevrolet
45	Brad Perez	Alpha Prime Racing	Chevrolet
48	Nick Sanchez (R)	Big Machine Racing	Chevrolet
50	Preston Pardus	Pardus Racing	Chevrolet
51	Jeremy Clements	Jeremy Clements Racing	Chevrolet
53	Sage Karam	Joey Gase Motorsports	Toyota
54	Taylor Gray (R)	Joe Gibbs Racing	Toyota
70	Thomas Annunziata	Cope Family Racing	Chevrolet
71	Ryan Ellis	DGM Racing	Chevrolet
88	Connor Zilisch (R)	JR Motorsports	Chevrolet
91	Josh Bilicki	DGM Racing	Chevrolet
99	Matt DiBenedetto	Viking Motorsports	Chevrolet
Official entry list

== Practice ==
The first and only practice session was held on Saturday, July 5, at 9:30 AM CST, and would last for 50 minutes. Shane van Gisbergen, driving for JR Motorsports, would set the fastest time in the session, with a lap of 1:31.328, and a speed of 86.720 mph (139.562 km/h).

Pos.	#	Driver	Team	Make	Time	Speed
1	9	Shane van Gisbergen (i)	JR Motorsports	Chevrolet	1:31.328	86.720
2	88	Connor Zilisch (R)	JR Motorsports	Chevrolet	1:31.529	86.530
3	41	Sam Mayer	Haas Factory Team	Ford	1:31.601	86.462
Full practice results

== Qualifying ==
Qualifying was held on Saturday, July 5, at 10:30 AM CST. Since the Chicago Street Course has a road course layout, the qualifying procedure used is a two group system with one round. Drivers will be separated into two groups, A and B. Each driver will have multiple laps to set a time. Whoever sets the fastest time between both groups will win the pole.

Under a 2021 rule change, the timing line in road course qualifying is "not" the start-finish line. Instead, the timing line for qualifying will be set at the exit of Turn 11 on South Michigan Avenue. Shane van Gisbergen, driving for JR Motorsports, would score the pole for the race, with a lap of 1:30.085, and a speed of 87.917 mph (141.489 km/h).

Two drivers failed to qualify: Kris Wright and Sage Karam.

=== Qualifying results ===
Pos.	#	Driver	Team	Make	Time	Speed
1	9	Shane van Gisbergen (i)	JR Motorsports	Chevrolet	1:30.085	87.917
2	21	Austin Hill	Richard Childress Racing	Chevrolet	1:30.347	87.662
3	41	Sam Mayer	Haas Factory Team	Ford	1:30.869	87.158
4	00	Sheldon Creed	Haas Factory Team	Ford	1:30.909	87.120
5	19	Jack Perkins	Joe Gibbs Racing	Toyota	1:30.925	87.105
6	7	Justin Allgaier	JR Motorsports	Chevrolet	1:30.965	87.066
7	18	William Sawalich (R)	Joe Gibbs Racing	Toyota	1:30.997	87.036
8	48	Nick Sanchez (R)	Big Machine Racing	Chevrolet	1:31.037	86.998
9	2	Jesse Love	Richard Childress Racing	Chevrolet	1:31.070	86.966
10	8	Sammy Smith	JR Motorsports	Chevrolet	1:31.264	86.781
11	20	Brandon Jones	Joe Gibbs Racing	Toyota	1:31.381	86.670
12	50	Preston Pardus	Pardus Racing	Chevrolet	1:31.402	86.650
13	1	Carson Kvapil (R)	JR Motorsports	Chevrolet	1:31.481	86.575
14	07	Alex Labbé	SS-Green Light Racing	Chevrolet	1:31.694	86.374
15	25	Harrison Burton	AM Racing	Ford	1:31.823	86.253
16	14	Connor Mosack (i)	SS-Green Light Racing	Chevrolet	1:31.968	86.117
17	32	Austin Green	Jordan Anderson Racing	Chevrolet	1:31.992	86.094
18	99	Matt DiBenedetto	Viking Motorsports	Chevrolet	1:32.009	86.079
19	51	Jeremy Clements	Jeremy Clements Racing	Chevrolet	1:32.090	86.003
20	70	Thomas Annunziata	Cope Family Racing	Chevrolet	1:32.123	85.972
21	10	Daniel Dye (R)	Kaulig Racing	Chevrolet	1:32.436	85.681
22	44	Brennan Poole	Alpha Prime Racing	Chevrolet	1:32.442	85.675
23	31	Blaine Perkins	Jordan Anderson Racing	Chevrolet	1:32.462	85.657
24	4	Parker Retzlaff	Alpha Prime Racing	Chevrolet	1:32.624	85.507
25	91	Josh Bilicki	DGM Racing	Chevrolet	1:32.641	85.491
26	45	Brad Perez	Alpha Prime Racing	Chevrolet	1:32.743	85.397
27	11	Josh Williams	Kaulig Racing	Chevrolet	1:32.763	85.379
28	42	Anthony Alfredo	Young's Motorsports	Chevrolet	1:32.933	85.223
29	35	Andre Castro	Joey Gase Motorsports	Chevrolet	1:32.934	85.222
30	24	Kaz Grala (i)	Sam Hunt Racing	Toyota	1:32.989	85.171
31	27	Jeb Burton	Jordan Anderson Racing	Chevrolet	1:33.044	85.121
32	71	Ryan Ellis	DGM Racing	Chevrolet	1:33.154	85.021
Qualified by owner's points
33	26	Dean Thompson (R)	Sam Hunt Racing	Toyota	1:33.740	84.489
34	28	Kyle Sieg	RSS Racing	Ford	1:33.972	84.280
35	88	Connor Zilisch (R)	JR Motorsports	Chevrolet	–	–
36	54	Taylor Gray (R)	Joe Gibbs Racing	Toyota	–	–
37	39	Ryan Sieg	RSS Racing	Ford	–	–
38	16	Christian Eckes (R)	Kaulig Racing	Chevrolet	–	–
Failed to qualify
39	5	Kris Wright	Our Motorsports	Chevrolet	1:34.866	83.486
40	53	Sage Karam	Joey Gase Motorsports	Toyota	–	–
Official qualifying results
Official starting lineup

== Race results ==
Stage 1 Laps: 15

Pos.	#	Driver	Team	Make	Pts
1	9	Shane van Gisbergen (i)	JR Motorsports	Chevrolet	0
2	00	Sheldon Creed	Haas Factory Team	Ford	9
3	21	Austin Hill	Richard Childress Racing	Chevrolet	8
4	41	Sam Mayer	Haas Factory Team	Ford	7
5	48	Nick Sanchez (R)	Big Machine Racing	Chevrolet	6
6	7	Justin Allgaier	JR Motorsports	Chevrolet	5
7	8	Sammy Smith	JR Motorsports	Chevrolet	4
8	88	Connor Zilisch (R)	JR Motorsports	Chevrolet	3
9	1	Carson Kvapil (R)	JR Motorsports	Chevrolet	2
10	07	Alex Labbé	SS-Green Light Racing	Chevrolet	1

Stage 2 Laps: 15

Pos.	#	Driver	Team	Make	Pts
1	00	Sheldon Creed	Haas Factory Team	Ford	10
2	2	Jesse Love	Richard Childress Racing	Chevrolet	9
3	21	Austin Hill	Richard Childress Racing	Chevrolet	8
4	88	Connor Zilisch (R)	JR Motorsports	Chevrolet	7
5	8	Sammy Smith	JR Motorsports	Chevrolet	6
6	27	Jeb Burton	Jordan Anderson Racing	Chevrolet	5
7	11	Josh Williams	Kaulig Racing	Chevrolet	4
8	7	Justin Allgaier	JR Motorsports	Chevrolet	3
9	20	Brandon Jones	Joe Gibbs Racing	Toyota	2
10	70	Thomas Annunziata	Cope Family Racing	Chevrolet	1

Stage 3 Laps: 25

Pos.	St.	#	Driver	Team	Make	Laps	Led	Status	Pts
1	1	9	Shane van Gisbergen (i)	JR Motorsports	Chevrolet	50	27	Running	0
2	35	88	Connor Zilisch (R)	JR Motorsports	Chevrolet	50	11	Running	45
3	4	00	Sheldon Creed	Haas Factory Team	Ford	50	9	Running	53
4	2	21	Austin Hill	Richard Childress Racing	Chevrolet	50	0	Running	49
5	8	48	Nick Sanchez (R)	Big Machine Racing	Chevrolet	50	0	Running	38
6	9	2	Jesse Love	Richard Childress Racing	Chevrolet	50	3	Running	40
7	10	8	Sammy Smith	JR Motorsports	Chevrolet	50	0	Running	40
8	3	41	Sam Mayer	Haas Factory Team	Ford	50	0	Running	36
9	17	32	Austin Green	Jordan Anderson Racing	Chevrolet	50	0	Running	28
10	22	44	Brennan Poole	Alpha Prime Racing	Chevrolet	50	0	Running	27
11	27	11	Josh Williams	Kaulig Racing	Chevrolet	50	0	Running	30
12	14	07	Alex Labbé	SS-Green Light Racing	Chevrolet	50	0	Running	26
13	15	25	Harrison Burton	AM Racing	Ford	50	0	Running	24
14	33	26	Dean Thompson (R)	Sam Hunt Racing	Toyota	50	0	Running	23
15	38	16	Christian Eckes (R)	Kaulig Racing	Chevrolet	50	0	Running	22
16	13	1	Carson Kvapil (R)	JR Motorsports	Chevrolet	50	0	Running	23
17	20	70	Thomas Annunziata	Cope Family Racing	Chevrolet	50	0	Running	21
18	23	31	Blaine Perkins	Jordan Anderson Racing	Chevrolet	50	0	Running	19
19	21	10	Daniel Dye (R)	Kaulig Racing	Chevrolet	50	0	Running	18
20	34	28	Kyle Sieg	RSS Racing	Ford	50	0	Running	17
21	11	20	Brandon Jones	Joe Gibbs Racing	Toyota	50	0	Running	18
22	30	24	Kaz Grala (i)	Sam Hunt Racing	Toyota	50	0	Running	0
23	6	7	Justin Allgaier	JR Motorsports	Chevrolet	50	0	Running	22
24	24	4	Parker Retzlaff	Alpha Prime Racing	Chevrolet	50	0	Running	13
25	32	71	Ryan Ellis	DGM Racing	Chevrolet	50	0	Running	12
26	16	14	Connor Mosack (i)	SS-Green Light Racing	Chevrolet	50	0	Running	0
27	31	27	Jeb Burton	Jordan Anderson Racing	Chevrolet	50	0	Running	15
28	18	99	Matt DiBenedetto	Viking Motorsports	Chevrolet	50	0	Running	9
29	12	50	Preston Pardus	Pardus Racing	Chevrolet	50	0	Running	8
30	26	45	Brad Perez	Alpha Prime Racing	Chevrolet	50	0	Running	7
31	19	51	Jeremy Clements	Jeremy Clements Racing	Chevrolet	50	0	Running	6
32	5	19	Jack Perkins	Joe Gibbs Racing	Toyota	46	0	Running	5
33	29	35	Andre Castro	Joey Gase Motorsports	Chevrolet	43	0	Accident	4
34	36	54	Taylor Gray	Joe Gibbs Racing	Toyota	38	0	DVP	3
35	25	91	Josh Bilicki	DGM Racing	Chevrolet	26	0	Electrical	2
36	28	42	Anthony Alfredo	Young's Motorsports	Chevrolet	26	0	Engine	1
37	7	18	William Sawalich (R)	Joe Gibbs Racing	Toyota	7	0	Electrical	1
38	37	39	Ryan Sieg	RSS Racing	Ford	5	0	Accident	1
Official race results

== Standings after the race ==
Drivers' Championship standings

	Pos	Driver	Points
	1	Justin Allgaier	646
1	2	Austin Hill	597 (–49)
1	3	Sam Mayer	597 (–49)
	4	Jesse Love	581 (–65)
	5	Connor Zilisch	571 (–75)
	6	Carson Kvapil	511 (–135)
	7	Brandon Jones	484 (–162)
3	8	Sheldon Creed	478 (–168)
1	9	Nick Sanchez	474 (–172)
1	10	Jeb Burton	460 (–186)
3	11	Sammy Smith	459 (–187)
4	12	Taylor Gray	456 (–190)
Official driver's standings

- Note: Only the first 12 positions are included for the driver standings.

Previous race: 2025 Focused Health 250 (Atlanta)	NASCAR Xfinity Series; 2025 season	Next race: 2025 Pit Boss/FoodMaxx 250
