= 2024 The Loop 110 =

18th race of the 2024 NASCAR Xfinity Series

Race details
- Race 18 of 33 of the 2024 NASCAR Xfinity Series
- Date: July 6, 2024
- Official name: 2nd Annual The Loop 110
- Location: Chicago Street Course in Chicago, Illinois
- Course: Permanent racing facility
- Course length: 2.2 miles (3.5 km)
- Distance: 50 laps, 110 mi (177 km)
- Average speed: 56.531 mph (90.978 km/h)

Pole position
Driver	Shane van Gisbergen	Kaulig Racing
- Time: 1:29.448

Most laps led
Drivers	Shane van Gisbergen	Kaulig Racing
	Jesse Love	Richard Childress Racing
- Laps: 14

Winner
No. 97	Shane van Gisbergen	Kaulig Racing

Television in the United States
- Network: NBC
- Announcers: Rick Allen and Steve Letarte (booth); Mike Bagley (Turns 1–2 & 6–10); Dillon Welch (Turns 3–5); Jeff Burton (Turn 11)

Radio in the United States
- Radio: MRN

The 2024 The Loop 110 was the 18th stock car race of the 2024 NASCAR Xfinity Series, and the 2nd iteration of the event. The race was held on Saturday, July 6, 2024, at the Chicago Street Course in Chicago, Illinois, a 2.2 miles (3.5 km) street course. The race took the scheduled 50 laps to complete. Shane van Gisbergen, driving for Kaulig Racing, would continue to show his dominance on road courses, passing the leader Jesse Love with under five laps to go, and holding off the rest of the field to earn his third career NASCAR Xfinity Series win, his third of the season, and his third consecutive win on a road course. The early stages of the race saw Gisbergen and Kyle Larson in an intense battle for the lead, and eventually led to Gisbergen winning the first stage. After shuffling towards the back of the field from a pit road strategy, Gisbergen and Larson made their way back to the front, with Larson unable to challenge Gisbergen and finished 3rd, behind Ty Gibbs. Gisbergen and Love both led a race-high 14 laps, while Larson led 12 laps.

== Report ==
=== Background ===
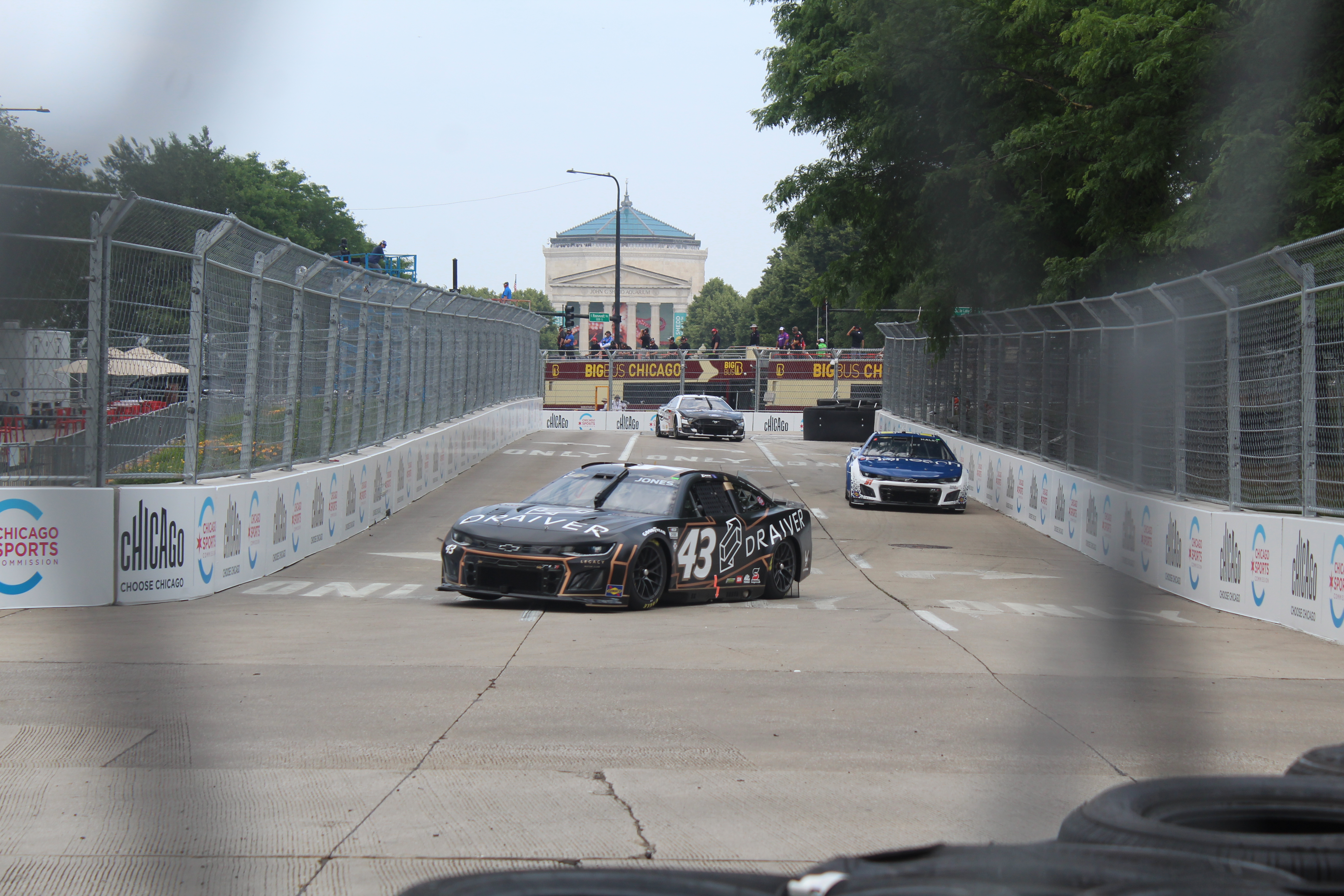
The Chicago Street Course, the circuit where the race was held.

The Chicago Street Course is a 2.2 mi (3.5 km) street circuit located in the city of Chicago, Illinois, United States. It hosts the NASCAR Cup Series and NASCAR Xfinity Series. The track was initially a conceptual track on iRacing made for the eNASCAR iRacing Pro Invitational Series in 2021.

The track for the actual race in 2023 ended up being the exact same layout as the version used in 2021 for the eNASCAR iRacing Pro Invitational Series. The start/finish line is located on South Columbus Drive in front of Buckingham Fountain in Grant Park. The cars will go south and then turn left onto East Balbo Drive and then right onto South Lake Shore Drive (also part of U.S. Route 41), which is alongside Lake Michigan. The cars will then turn right onto East Roosevelt Road and then make another right, which gets them back onto South Columbus Drive where they are going north. They will then reach the intersection of South Columbus Drive and East Balbo Drive again and will make a left turn. When they are back on East Balbo Drive, they will cross a bridge over the Metra Electric District tracks. Next, the cars will turn right onto South Michigan Avenue and go north, go onto East Congress Plaza Drive and back onto South Michigan Ave. Lastly, they will make a right turn onto East Jackson Drive, go back across the Metra Electric tracks, and right back onto South Columbus Drive to the start/finish line.

On October 20, 2023, NASCAR announced that the 2024 Xfinity Series Chicago Street Race would be shortened from 121 miles (194 km) and 55 laps to 110 miles (177 km) and 50 laps.

==== Entry list ====
- (R) denotes rookie driver.
- (i) denotes driver who is ineligible for series driver points.

#	Driver	Team	Make
00	Cole Custer	Stewart–Haas Racing	Ford
1	Sam Mayer	JR Motorsports	Chevrolet
2	Jesse Love (R)	Richard Childress Racing	Chevrolet
4	Ty Dillon (i)	JD Motorsports	Chevrolet
5	Anthony Alfredo	Our Motorsports	Chevrolet
6	Thomas Annunziata	JD Motorsports	Chevrolet
07	Alex Labbé	SS-Green Light Racing	Chevrolet
7	Justin Allgaier	JR Motorsports	Chevrolet
8	Sammy Smith	JR Motorsports	Chevrolet
9	Brandon Jones	JR Motorsports	Chevrolet
11	Josh Williams	Kaulig Racing	Chevrolet
14	Andre Castro	SS-Green Light Racing	Chevrolet
15	Joey Logano (i)	AM Racing	Ford
16	A. J. Allmendinger	Kaulig Racing	Chevrolet
17	Kyle Larson (i)	Hendrick Motorsports	Chevrolet
18	Sheldon Creed	Joe Gibbs Racing	Toyota
19	Ty Gibbs (i)	Joe Gibbs Racing	Toyota
20	John Hunter Nemechek (i)	Joe Gibbs Racing	Toyota
21	Austin Hill	Richard Childress Racing	Chevrolet
26	Sage Karam	Sam Hunt Racing	Toyota
27	Jeb Burton	Jordan Anderson Racing	Chevrolet
28	Kyle Sieg	RSS Racing	Ford
29	Blaine Perkins	RSS Racing	Ford
31	Parker Retzlaff	Jordan Anderson Racing	Chevrolet
32	Austin Green	Jordan Anderson Racing	Chevrolet
35	Brad Perez	Joey Gase Motorsports	Ford
36	Daniel Suárez (i)	DGM Racing	Chevrolet
38	Matt DiBenedetto	RSS Racing	Ford
39	Ryan Sieg	RSS Racing	Ford
42	Leland Honeyman (R)	Young's Motorsports	Chevrolet
43	Ryan Ellis	Alpha Prime Racing	Chevrolet
44	Brennan Poole	Alpha Prime Racing	Chevrolet
45	Alon Day	Alpha Prime Racing	Chevrolet
48	Parker Kligerman	Big Machine Racing	Chevrolet
50	Preston Pardus	Pardus Racing	Chevrolet
51	Jeremy Clements	Jeremy Clements Racing	Chevrolet
53	Kenko Miura	Joey Gase Motorsports	Toyota
81	Chandler Smith	Joe Gibbs Racing	Toyota
88	Connor Mosack	JR Motorsports	Chevrolet
91	Kyle Weatherman	DGM Racing	Chevrolet
92	Josh Bilicki	DGM Racing	Chevrolet
97	Shane van Gisbergen (R)	Kaulig Racing	Chevrolet
98	Riley Herbst	Stewart–Haas Racing	Ford
Official entry list

== Practice ==
The first and only practice session was held on Saturday, July 6, at 9:30 AM CST, and would last for 50 minutes. Sam Mayer, driving for JR Motorsports, would set the fastest time in the session, with a lap of 1:30.737, and a speed of 87.285 mph (140.472 km/h).

Pos.	#	Driver	Team	Make	Time	Speed
1	1	Sam Mayer	JR Motorsports	Chevrolet	1:30.737	87.285
2	97	Shane van Gisbergen (R)	Kaulig Racing	Chevrolet	1:30.816	87.209
3	19	Ty Gibbs (i)	Joe Gibbs Racing	Toyota	1:30.971	87.061
Full practice results

== Qualifying ==
Qualifying was held on Saturday, July 6, at 10:30 AM CST. Since the Chicago Street Course has a road course layout, the qualifying system is a two group system, with two rounds. Drivers will be separated into two groups, Group A and B. Each driver will have multiple laps to set a time. The fastest 5 drivers from each group will advance to the final round. The fastest driver to set a time in that round will win the pole.

Under a 2021 rule change, the timing line in road course qualifying is "not" the start-finish line. Instead, the timing line for qualifying will be set at the exit of Turn 11 on South Michigan Avenue. Shane van Gisbergen, driving for Kaulig Racing, would win the pole after advancing from the preliminary round and setting the fastest time in Round 2, with a lap of 1:29.448, and a speed of 88.543 mph (142.496 km/h).

Five drivers would fail to qualify: Ty Dillon, Kenko Miura, Thomas Annunziata, Brad Perez, and Alon Day.

=== Qualifying results ===
Pos.	#	Driver	Team	Make	Time (R1)	Speed (R1)	Time (R2)	Speed (R2)
1	97	Shane van Gisbergen (R)	Kaulig Racing	Chevrolet	1:29.777	88.219	1:29.448	88.543
2	17	Kyle Larson (i)	Hendrick Motorsports	Chevrolet	1:29.860	88.137	1:29.461	88.530
3	88	Connor Mosack	JR Motorsports	Chevrolet	1:30.276	87.731	1:29.980	88.020
4	19	Ty Gibbs (i)	Joe Gibbs Racing	Toyota	1:29.997	88.003	1:30.070	87.932
5	1	Sam Mayer	JR Motorsports	Chevrolet	1:29.880	88.117	1:30.198	87.807
6	20	John Hunter Nemechek (i)	Joe Gibbs Racing	Toyota	1:30.538	87.477	1:30.253	87.753
7	48	Parker Kligerman	Big Machine Racing	Chevrolet	1:30.175	87.829	1:30.508	87.506
8	2	Jesse Love (R)	Richard Childress Racing	Chevrolet	1:30.802	87.223	1:30.612	87.406
9	81	Chandler Smith	Joe Gibbs Racing	Toyota	1:30.255	87.751	1:31.234	86.810
10	00	Cole Custer	Stewart–Haas Racing	Ford	1:30.514	87.500	1:31.521	86.538
Eliminated in Round 1
11	16	A. J. Allmendinger	Kaulig Racing	Chevrolet	1:30.613	87.405	—	—
12	31	Parker Retzlaff	Jordan Anderson Racing	Chevrolet	1:30.827	87.199	—	—
13	21	Austin Hill	Richard Childress Racing	Chevrolet	1:30.876	87.152	—	—
14	8	Sammy Smith	JR Motorsports	Chevrolet	1:30.879	87.149	—	—
15	15	Joey Logano (i)	AM Racing	Ford	1:31.192	86.850	—	—
16	07	Alex Labbé	SS-Green Light Racing	Chevrolet	1:31.373	86.678	—	—
17	50	Preston Pardus	Pardus Racing	Chevrolet	1:31.425	86.628	—	—
18	5	Anthony Alfredo	Our Motorsports	Chevrolet	1:31.625	86.439	—	—
19	32	Austin Green	Jordan Anderson Racing	Chevrolet	1:31.705	86.364	—	—
20	98	Riley Herbst	Stewart–Haas Racing	Ford	1:31.738	86.333	—	—
21	42	Leland Honeyman (R)	Young's Motorsports	Chevrolet	1:31.770	86.303	—	—
22	39	Ryan Sieg	RSS Racing	Ford	1:31.807	86.268	—	—
23	27	Jeb Burton	Jordan Anderson Racing	Chevrolet	1:31.884	86.196	—	—
24	92	Josh Bilicki	DGM Racing	Chevrolet	1:31.890	86.190	—	—
25	44	Brennan Poole	Alpha Prime Racing	Chevrolet	1:31.932	86.151	—	—
26	38	Matt DiBenedetto	RSS Racing	Ford	1:31.989	86.097	—	—
27	43	Ryan Ellis	Alpha Prime Racing	Chevrolet	1:31.995	86.092	—	—
28	91	Kyle Weatherman	DGM Racing	Chevrolet	1:31.995	86.092	—	—
29	29	Blaine Perkins	RSS Racing	Ford	1:32.035	86.054	—	—
30	11	Josh Williams	Kaulig Racing	Chevrolet	1:32.130	85.965	—	—
31	36	Daniel Suárez (i)	DGM Racing	Chevrolet	1:32.136	85.960	—	—
32	9	Brandon Jones	JR Motorsports	Chevrolet	1:32.148	85.949	—	—
33	14	Andre Castro	SS-Green Light Racing	Chevrolet	1:32.242	85.861	—	—
Qualified by owner's points
34	51	Jeremy Clements	Jeremy Clements Racing	Chevrolet	1:32.726	85.413	—	—
35	28	Kyle Sieg	RSS Racing	Ford	—	—	—	—
36	7	Justin Allgaier	JR Motorsports	Chevrolet	—	—	—	—
37	18	Sheldon Creed	Joe Gibbs Racing	Toyota	—	—	—	—
38	26	Sage Karam	Sam Hunt Racing	Toyota	—	—	—	—
Failed to qualify
39	4	Ty Dillon (i)	JD Motorsports	Chevrolet	1:32.958	85.200	—	—
41	53	Kenko Miura	Joey Gase Motorsports	Toyota	1:36.500	82.073	—	—
40	6	Thomas Annunziata	JD Motorsports	Chevrolet	1:37.831	80.956	—	—
42	35	Brad Perez	Joey Gase Motorsports	Ford	—	—	—	—
43	45	Alon Day	Alpha Prime Racing	Chevrolet	—	—	—	—
Official qualifying results
Official starting lineup

== Race results ==
Stage 1 Laps: 15

Pos.	#	Driver	Team	Make	Pts
1	97	Shane van Gisbergen (R)	Kaulig Racing	Chevrolet	10
2	17	Kyle Larson (i)	Hendrick Motorsports	Chevrolet	0
3	19	Ty Gibbs (i)	Joe Gibbs Racing	Toyota	0
4	88	Connor Mosack	JR Motorsports	Chevrolet	7
5	00	Cole Custer	Stewart–Haas Racing	Ford	6
6	16	A. J. Allmendinger	Kaulig Racing	Chevrolet	5
7	2	Jesse Love (R)	Richard Childress Racing	Chevrolet	4
8	21	Austin Hill	Richard Childress Racing	Chevrolet	3
9	1	Sam Mayer	JR Motorsports	Chevrolet	2
10	48	Parker Kligerman	Big Machine Racing	Chevrolet	1

Stage 2 Laps: 15

Pos.	#	Driver	Team	Make	Pts
1	21	Austin Hill	Richard Childress Racing	Chevrolet	10
2	8	Sammy Smith	JR Motorsports	Chevrolet	9
3	2	Jesse Love (R)	Richard Childress Racing	Chevrolet	8
4	7	Justin Allgaier	JR Motorsports	Chevrolet	7
5	18	Sheldon Creed	Joe Gibbs Racing	Toyota	6
6	19	Ty Gibbs (i)	Joe Gibbs Racing	Toyota	0
7	48	Parker Kligerman	Big Machine Racing	Chevrolet	3
8	1	Sam Mayer	JR Motorsports	Chevrolet	4
9	20	John Hunter Nemechek (i)	Joe Gibbs Racing	Toyota	0
10	97	Shane van Gisbergen (R)	Kaulig Racing	Chevrolet	1

Stage 3 Laps: 20

Pos.	St.	#	Driver	Team	Make	Laps	Led	Status	Pts
1	1	97	Shane van Gisbergen (R)	Kaulig Racing	Chevrolet	50	14	Running	51
2	4	19	Ty Gibbs (i)	Joe Gibbs Racing	Toyota	50	0	Running	0
3	2	17	Kyle Larson (i)	Hendrick Motorsports	Chevrolet	50	12	Running	0
4	7	48	Parker Kligerman	Big Machine Racing	Chevrolet	50	0	Running	38
5	8	2	Jesse Love (R)	Richard Childress Racing	Chevrolet	50	14	Running	44
6	3	88	Connor Mosack	JR Motorsports	Chevrolet	50	0	Running	38
7	13	21	Austin Hill	Richard Childress Racing	Chevrolet	50	8	Running	43
8	15	15	Joey Logano (i)	AM Racing	Ford	50	0	Running	0
9	36	7	Justin Allgaier	JR Motorsports	Chevrolet	50	0	Running	35
10	19	32	Austin Green	Jordan Anderson Racing	Chevrolet	50	0	Running	27
11	11	16	A. J. Allmendinger	Kaulig Racing	Chevrolet	50	0	Running	31
12	30	11	Josh Williams	Kaulig Racing	Chevrolet	50	0	Running	25
13	14	8	Sammy Smith	JR Motorsports	Chevrolet	50	2	Running	33
14	28	91	Kyle Weatherman	DGM Racing	Chevrolet	50	0	Running	23
15	23	27	Jeb Burton	Jordan Anderson Racing	Chevrolet	50	0	Running	22
16	22	39	Ryan Sieg	RSS Racing	Ford	50	0	Running	21
17	32	9	Brandon Jones	JR Motorsports	Chevrolet	50	0	Running	20
18	10	00	Cole Custer	Stewart–Haas Racing	Ford	50	0	Running	25
19	5	1	Sam Mayer	JR Motorsports	Chevrolet	50	0	Runnin	23
20	25	44	Brennan Poole	Alpha Prime Racing	Chevrolet	50	0	Running	17
21	27	43	Ryan Ellis	Alpha Prime Racing	Chevrolet	50	0	Running	16
22	35	28	Kyle Sieg	RSS Racing	Ford	50	0	Running	15
23	26	38	Matt DiBenedetto	RSS Racing	Ford	50	0	Running	14
24	29	29	Blaine Perkins	RSS Racing	Ford	50	0	Running	13
25	6	20	John Hunter Nemechek (i)	Joe Gibbs Racing	Toyota	50	0	Running	0
26	37	18	Sheldon Creed	Joe Gibbs Racing	Toyota	50	0	Running	17
27	31	36	Daniel Suárez (i)	DGM Racing	Chevrolet	50	0	Running	0
28	20	98	Riley Herbst	Stewart–Haas Racing	Ford	47	0	Overheating	9
29	16	07	Alex Labbé	SS-Green Light Racing	Chevrolet	45	0	Running	8
30	18	5	Anthony Alfredo	Our Motorsports	Chevrolet	45	0	Running	7
31	21	42	Leland Honeyman (R)	Young's Motorsports	Chevrolet	44	0	Accident	6
32	17	50	Preston Pardus	Pardus Racing	Chevrolet	38	0	Electrical	5
33	38	26	Sage Karam	Sam Hunt Racing	Toyota	37	0	Accident	4
34	12	31	Parker Retzlaff	Jordan Anderson Racing	Chevrolet	36	0	Accident	3
35	33	14	Andre Castro	SS-Green Light Racing	Chevrolet	34	0	Accident	2
36	24	92	Josh Bilicki	DGM Racing	Chevrolet	34	0	Accident	1
37	34	51	Jeremy Clements	Jeremy Clements Racing	Chevrolet	15	0	Accident	1
38	9	81	Chandler Smith	Joe Gibbs Racing	Toyota	5	0	Engine	1
Official race results

== Standings after the race ==
Drivers' Championship standings

	Pos	Driver	Points
	1	Cole Custer	657
1	2	Justin Allgaier	619 (−38)
1	3	Chandler Smith	618 (−39)
	4	Austin Hill	597 (−60)
1	5	Jesse Love	548 (−109)
1	6	Riley Herbst	523 (−134)
	7	A. J. Allmendinger	522 (−135)
	8	Sheldon Creed	505 (−152)
	9	Parker Kligerman	495 (−162)
	10	Sam Mayer	474 (−183)
2	11	Shane van Gisbergen	457 (−200)
1	12	Sammy Smith	455 (−202)
Official driver's standings

Manufacturers' Championship standings

Pos	Manufacturer	Points
1	Chevrolet	597
2	Toyota	574 (−23)
3	Ford	504 (−93)

- Note: Only the first 12 positions are included for the driver standings.

Previous race: 2024 Tennessee Lottery 250	NASCAR Xfinity Series; 2024 season	Next race: 2024 Explore the Pocono Mountains 225
