= 2023 The Loop 121 =

16th race of the 2023 NASCAR Xfinity Series

Race details
- Race 16 of 33 of the 2023 NASCAR Xfinity Series
- Date: July 1–2, 2023
- Official name: Inaugural The Loop 121
- Location: Chicago Street Course in Chicago, Illinois
- Course: Permanent racing facility
- Course length: 2.2 miles (3.5 km)
- Distance: 25 laps, 55 mi (88 km)
- Scheduled distance: 55 laps, 121 mi (194 km)
- Average speed: 52.660 mph (84.748 km/h)

Pole position
Driver	Cole Custer	Stewart-Haas Racing
- Time: 1:30.421

Most laps led
Driver	Cole Custer	Stewart-Haas Racing
- Laps: 25

Winner
No. 00	Cole Custer	Stewart-Haas Racing

Television in the United States
- Network: USA
- Announcers: Rick Allen, Steve Letarte (booth), Mike Bagley (Turns 1 and 6), Dale Earnhardt Jr. (Turn 4), and Jeff Burton (Turn 11)

Radio in the United States
- Radio: MRN

The 2023 The Loop 121 was the 16th stock car race of the 2023 NASCAR Xfinity Series, and the inaugural iteration of the event. The race was scheduled to be held on Saturday, July 1, 2023, but after 25 laps, the race was postponed until Sunday, July 2, due to inclement weather. The race was held in Chicago, Illinois at the Chicago Street Course, a 2.2 miles (3.5 km) street course. The race was originally scheduled to be contested over 55 laps, but was decreased to 25 laps (2 laps short of the typical point where the race could be called official) due to downpouring rain and standing water. Cole Custer, driving for Stewart-Haas Racing, would lead all 25 laps of the race after starting from the pole, and earned his 12th career NASCAR Xfinity Series win, and his second of the season. To fill out the podium, John Hunter Nemechek, driving for Joe Gibbs Racing, and Justin Allgaier, driving for JR Motorsports, would finish 2nd and 3rd, respectively. This was the first street race to be contested in the series.

== Background ==
The Chicago Street Course is a 2.2 mi (3.5 km) street circuit located in the city of Chicago, Illinois, United States. It hosts the NASCAR Cup Series and NASCAR Xfinity Series. The track was initially a conceptual track on iRacing made for the eNASCAR iRacing Pro Invitational Series in 2021.

The track for the actual race in 2023 ended up being the exact same layout as the version used in 2021 for the eNASCAR iRacing Pro Invitational Series. The start/finish line is located on South Columbus Drive in front of Buckingham Fountain in Grant Park. The cars will go south and then turn left onto East Balbo Drive and then right onto South Lake Shore Drive (also part of U.S. Route 41), which is alongside Lake Michigan. The cars will then turn right onto East Roosevelt Road and then make another right, which gets them back onto South Columbus Drive where they are going north. They will then reach the intersection of South Columbus Drive and East Balbo Drive again and will make a left turn. When they are back on East Balbo Drive, they will cross a bridge over the Metra Electric District tracks. Next, the cars will turn right onto South Michigan Avenue and go north, go onto East Congress Plaza Drive and back onto South Michigan Ave. Lastly, they will make a right turn onto East Jackson Drive, go back across the Metra Electric tracks, and right back onto South Columbus Drive to the start/finish line.

=== Entry list ===
- (R) denotes rookie driver.

#	Driver	Team	Make
00	Cole Custer	Stewart-Haas Racing	Ford
1	Sam Mayer	JR Motorsports	Chevrolet
02	Blaine Perkins (R)	Our Motorsports	Chevrolet
2	Sheldon Creed	Richard Childress Racing	Chevrolet
4	Kyle Weatherman	JD Motorsports	Chevrolet
6	Brennan Poole	JD Motorsports	Chevrolet
07	Spencer Pumpelly	SS-Green Light Racing	Chevrolet
7	Justin Allgaier	JR Motorsports	Chevrolet
08	Joey Gase	SS-Green Light Racing	Ford
8	Josh Berry	JR Motorsports	Chevrolet
9	Brandon Jones	JR Motorsports	Chevrolet
10	Justin Marks	Kaulig Racing	Chevrolet
11	Daniel Hemric	Kaulig Racing	Chevrolet
16	Chandler Smith (R)	Kaulig Racing	Chevrolet
18	Sammy Smith (R)	Joe Gibbs Racing	Toyota
19	Connor Mosack (R)	Joe Gibbs Racing	Toyota
20	John Hunter Nemechek	Joe Gibbs Racing	Toyota
21	Austin Hill	Richard Childress Racing	Chevrolet
24	Parker Chase	Sam Hunt Racing	Toyota
25	Brett Moffitt	AM Racing	Ford
26	Kaz Grala	Sam Hunt Racing	Toyota
27	Jeb Burton	Jordan Anderson Racing	Chevrolet
28	Brent Sherman	RSS Racing	Ford
31	Parker Retzlaff (R)	Jordan Anderson Racing	Chevrolet
34	Andre Castro	Jesse Iwuji Motorsports	Chevrolet
35	Alex Labbé	Emerling-Gase Motorsports	Toyota
36	Alex Guenette	DGM Racing	Chevrolet
38	Joe Graf Jr.	RSS Racing	Ford
39	Ryan Sieg	RSS Racing	Ford
43	Ryan Ellis	Alpha Prime Racing	Chevrolet
44	Sage Karam	Alpha Prime Racing	Chevrolet
45	Jeffrey Earnhardt	Alpha Prime Racing	Chevrolet
48	Parker Kligerman	Big Machine Racing	Chevrolet
50	Preston Pardus	Pardus Racing	Chevrolet
51	Jeremy Clements	Jeremy Clements Racing	Chevrolet
53	Brad Perez	Emerling-Gase Motorsports	Chevrolet
66	Dexter Stacey	MBM Motorsports	Toyota
74	Dawson Cram	CHK Racing	Chevrolet
78	Anthony Alfredo	B. J. McLeod Motorsports	Chevrolet
88	Miguel Paludo	JR Motorsports	Chevrolet
91	Dexter Bean	DGM Racing	Chevrolet
92	Josh Williams	DGM Racing	Chevrolet
98	Riley Herbst	Stewart-Haas Racing	Ford
Official entry list

== Practice ==
The first and only practice session was held on Saturday, July 1, at 10:00 AM CST, and would last for 50 minutes. Justin Marks, driving for Kaulig Racing, would set the fastest time in the session, with a lap of 1:32.138, and an average speed of 85.958 mph (138.336 km/h).

Pos.	#	Driver	Team	Make	Time	Speed
1	10	Justin Marks	Kaulig Racing	Chevrolet	1:32.138	85.958
2	2	Sheldon Creed	Richard Childress Racing	Chevrolet	1:32.157	85.940
3	1	Sam Mayer	JR Motorsports	Chevrolet	1:32.250	85.854
Full practice results

== Qualifying ==
Qualifying was held on Saturday, July 1, at 11:00 AM CST. Since the Chicago Street Course is a street course, the qualifying system is a two group system, with two rounds. Drivers will be separated into two groups, Group A and Group B. Each driver will have multiple laps to set a time. The fastest 5 drivers from each group will advance to the final round. The fastest driver to set a time in that round will win the pole. Cole Custer, driving for Stewart-Haas Racing, would score the pole for the race, with a lap of 1:30.421, and an average speed of 87.590 mph (140.962 km/h).

Pos.	#	Driver	Team	Make	Time (R1)	Speed (R1)	Time (R2)	Speed (R2)
1	00	Cole Custer	Stewart-Haas Racing	Ford	1:31.087	86.950	1:30.421	87.590
2	2	Sheldon Creed	Richard Childress Racing	Chevrolet	1:30.702	87.319	1:30.439	87.573
3	20	John Hunter Nemechek	Joe Gibbs Racing	Toyota	1:31.675	86.392	1:30.713	87.308
4	19	Connor Mosack (R)	Joe Gibbs Racing	Toyota	1:31.090	86.947	1:31.018	87.016
5	21	Austin Hill	Richard Childress Racing	Chevrolet	1:31.035	87.000	1:31.458	86.597
6	7	Justin Allgaier	JR Motorsports	Chevrolet	1:31.461	86.594	1:31.781	86.292
7	25	Brett Moffitt	AM Racing	Ford	1:31.540	86.520	1:31.791	86.283
8	18	Sammy Smith (R)	Joe Gibbs Racing	Toyota	1:31.585	86.477	1:31.830	86.246
9	11	Daniel Hemric	Kaulig Racing	Chevrolet	1:31.741	86.330	1:32.064	86.027
10	48	Parker Kligerman	Big Machine Racing	Chevrolet	1:31.797	86.277	1:33.603	84.613
Eliminated from Round 1
11	44	Sage Karam	Alpha Prime Racing	Chevrolet	1:31.711	86.358	—	—
12	10	Justin Marks	Kaulig Racing	Chevrolet	1:31.872	86.207	—	—
13	50	Preston Pardus	Pardus Racing	Chevrolet	1:31.915	86.167	—	—
14	1	Sam Mayer	JR Motorsports	Chevrolet	1:32.322	85.787	—	—
15	98	Riley Herbst	Stewart-Haas Racing	Ford	1:32.360	85.751	—	—
16	16	Chandler Smith (R)	Kaulig Racing	Chevrolet	1:32.366	85.746	—	—
17	88	Miguel Paludo	JR Motorsports	Chevrolet	1:32.456	85.662	—	—
18	36	Alex Guenette	DGM Racing	Chevrolet	1:32.564	85.562	—	—
19	35	Alex Labbé	Emerling-Gase Motorsports	Toyota	1:32.644	85.489	—	—
20	43	Ryan Ellis	Alpha Prime Racing	Chevrolet	1:32.802	85.343	—	—
21	31	Parker Retzlaff (R)	Jordan Anderson Racing	Chevrolet	1:32.934	85.222	—	—
22	07	Spencer Pumpelly	SS-Green Light Racing	Chevrolet	1:32.939	85.217	—	—
23	8	Josh Berry	JR Motorsports	Chevrolet	1:32.954	85.203	—	—
24	39	Ryan Sieg	RSS Racing	Ford	1:33.079	85.089	—	—
25	26	Kaz Grala	Sam Hunt Racing	Toyota	1:33.125	85.047	—	—
26	24	Parker Chase	Sam Hunt Racing	Toyota	1:33.192	84.986	—	—
27	53	Brad Perez	Emerling-Gase Motorsports	Chevrolet	1:33.251	84.932	—	—
28	34	Andre Castro	Jesse Iwuji Motorsports	Chevrolet	1:33.265	84.919	—	—
29	02	Blaine Perkins (R)	Our Motorsports	Chevrolet	1:33.317	84.872	—	—
30	9	Brandon Jones	JR Motorsports	Chevrolet	1:33.454	84.748	—	—
31	27	Jeb Burton	Jordan Anderson Racing	Chevrolet	1:33.527	84.681	—	—
32	4	Kyle Weatherman	JD Motorsports	Chevrolet	1:33.621	84.596	—	—
33	6	Brennan Poole	JD Motorsports	Chevrolet	1:33.697	84.528	—	—
Qualified by owner's points
34	78	Anthony Alfredo	B. J. McLeod Motorsports	Chevrolet	1:33.997	84.258	—	—
35	38	Joe Graf Jr.	RSS Racing	Ford	1:34.570	83.747	—	—
36	92	Josh Williams	DGM Racing	Chevrolet	1:35.061	83.315	—	—
37	51	Jeremy Clements	Jeremy Clements Racing	Chevrolet	1:35.303	83.103	—	—
38	28	Brent Sherman	RSS Racing	Ford	1:36.771	81.843	—	—
Failed to qualify
39	91	Dexter Bean	DGM Racing	Chevrolet	1:34.027	84.231	—	—
40	45	Jeffrey Earnhardt	Alpha Prime Racing	Chevrolet	1:34.423	83.878	—	—
41	08	Joey Gase	SS-Green Light Racing	Ford	1:34.576	83.742	—	—
42	74	Dawson Cram	CHK Racing	Chevrolet	1:35.472	82.956	—	—
43	66	Dexter Stacey	MBM Motorsports	Toyota	1:38.233	80.625	—	—
Official qualifying results
Official starting lineup

== Race results ==
Only 25 laps of the race were run, the entirety of stage 1 and the first 10 laps of stage 2. After several lightning delays on Saturday, NASCAR planned to postpone the rest of the race to Sunday, the morning before the Cup race. However, torrential rain on Sunday morning (including several flash flood warnings issued for the region) led to NASCAR issuing an unprecedented decision to call the race before the point the race could be called official.

Stage 1 Laps: 15

Pos.	#	Driver	Team	Make	Pts
1	00	Cole Custer	Stewart-Haas Racing	Ford	10
2	20	John Hunter Nemechek	Joe Gibbs Racing	Toyota	9
3	21	Austin Hill	Richard Childress Racing	Chevrolet	8
4	7	Justin Allgaier	JR Motorsports	Chevrolet	7
5	19	Connor Mosack (R)	Joe Gibbs Racing	Toyota	6
6	25	Brett Moffitt	AM Racing	Ford	5
7	18	Sammy Smith (R)	Joe Gibbs Racing	Toyota	4
8	11	Daniel Hemric	Kaulig Racing	Chevrolet	3
9	48	Parker Kligerman	Big Machine Racing	Chevrolet	2
10	16	Chandler Smith (R)	Kaulig Racing	Chevrolet	1

Stage 2 Laps: 10* (Note: Stage 2 was scheduled to be 15 laps, but due to the Sunday postponement and downpouring rain, the race was called five laps before the stage ended. The running positions at lap 25 would determine the overall race finish.)

The drivers who finished in the top ten were given stage points (10-1)

Final Results

Pos.	St	#	Driver	Team	Make	Laps	Led	Status	Pts
1	1	00	Cole Custer	Stewart-Haas Racing	Ford	25	25	Running	60
2	3	20	John Hunter Nemechek	Joe Gibbs Racing	Toyota	25	0	Running	53
3	6	7	Justin Allgaier	JR Motorsports	Chevrolet	25	0	Running	49
4	7	25	Brett Moffitt	AM Racing	Ford	25	0	Running	45
5	5	21	Austin Hill	Richard Childress Racing	Chevrolet	25	0	Running	46
6	8	18	Sammy Smith (R)	Joe Gibbs Racing	Toyota	25	0	Running	40
7	9	11	Daniel Hemric	Kaulig Racing	Chevrolet	25	0	Running	37
8	16	16	Chandler Smith (R)	Kaulig Racing	Chevrolet	25	0	Running	33
9	10	48	Parker Kligerman	Big Machine Racing	Chevrolet	25	0	Running	32
10	25	26	Kaz Grala	Sam Hunt Racing	Toyota	25	0	Running	28
11	2	2	Sheldon Creed	Richard Childress Racing	Chevrolet	25	0	Running	26
12	13	50	Preston Pardus	Pardus Racing	Chevrolet	25	0	Running	25
13	17	88	Miguel Paludo	JR Motorsports	Chevrolet	25	0	Running	24
14	32	4	Kyle Weatherman	JD Motorsports	Chevrolet	25	0	Running	23
15	18	36	Alex Guenette	DGM Racing	Chevrolet	25	0	Running	22
16	26	24	Parker Chase	Sam Hunt Racing	Toyota	25	0	Running	21
17	29	02	Blaine Perkins (R)	Our Motorsports	Chevrolet	25	0	Running	20
18	14	1	Sam Mayer	JR Motorsports	Chevrolet	25	0	Running	19
19	31	27	Jeb Burton	Jordan Anderson Racing	Chevrolet	25	0	Running	18
20	37	51	Jeremy Clements	Jeremy Clements Racing	Chevrolet	25	0	Running	17
21	19	35	Alex Labbé	Emerling-Gase Motorsports	Toyota	25	0	Running	16
22	11	44	Sage Karam	Alpha Prime Racing	Chevrolet	25	0	Running	15
23	23	8	Josh Berry	JR Motorsports	Chevrolet	25	0	Running	14
24	15	98	Riley Herbst	Stewart-Haas Racing	Ford	25	0	Running	13
25	24	39	Ryan Sieg	RSS Racing	Ford	25	0	Running	12
26	33	6	Brennan Poole	JD Motorsports	Chevrolet	25	0	Running	11
27	34	78	Anthony Alfredo	B. J. McLeod Motorsports	Chevrolet	25	0	Running	10
28	22	07	Spencer Pumpelly	SS-Green Light Racing	Chevrolet	25	0	Running	9
29	21	31	Parker Retzlaff (R)	Jordan Anderson Racing	Chevrolet	25	0	Running	8
30	30	9	Brandon Jones	JR Motorsports	Chevrolet	25	0	Running	7
31	20	43	Ryan Ellis	Alpha Prime Racing	Chevrolet	25	0	Running	6
32	27	53	Brad Perez	Emerling-Gase Motorsports	Chevrolet	25	0	Running	5
33	35	38	Joe Graf Jr.	RSS Racing	Ford	25	0	Running	4
34	38	28	Brent Sherman	RSS Racing	Ford	25	0	Running	3
35	4	19	Connor Mosack (R)	Joe Gibbs Racing	Toyota	25	0	Running	8
36	36	92	Josh Williams	DGM Racing	Chevrolet	22	0	Running	1
37	28	34	Andre Castro	Jesse Iwuji Motorsports	Chevrolet	16	0	Accident	1
38	12	10	Justin Marks	Kaulig Racing	Chevrolet	3	0	Engine	1
Official race results

== Standings after the race ==
Drivers' Championship standings

	Pos	Driver	Points
	1	John Hunter Nemechek	638
	2	Austin Hill	622 (-16)
1	3	Cole Custer	594 (–44)
1	4	Justin Allgaier	593 (–45)
1	5	Chandler Smith	498 (–140)
1	6	Josh Berry	484 (–154)
1	7	Sam Mayer	448 (–190)
1	8	Sheldon Creed	445 (–193)
1	9	Daniel Hemric	436 (–202)
1	10	Sammy Smith	435 (–203)
2	11	Riley Herbst	429 (–209)
	12	Parker Kligerman	403 (–235)
Official driver's standings

- Note: Only the first 12 positions are included for the driver standings.

Previous race: 2023 Tennessee Lottery 250	NASCAR Xfinity Series; 2023 season	Next race: 2023 Alsco Uniforms 250
