= Chicago Grand Prix =

The Chicago Grand Prix may refer to:

- Peak Antifreeze Indy 300, an IndyCar Series race at Chicagoland Speedway in Joliet, Illinois
- Grand Prix of Chicago, a CART race held from 1999 through 2002 at Sportsman's Park Racetrack
- Grant Park 165, a NASCAR Cup Series Street Race
- Chicago Grand Prix (tennis), a tournament from 1985 through 1987
