= Connor Mosack =

American racing driver (born 1999)

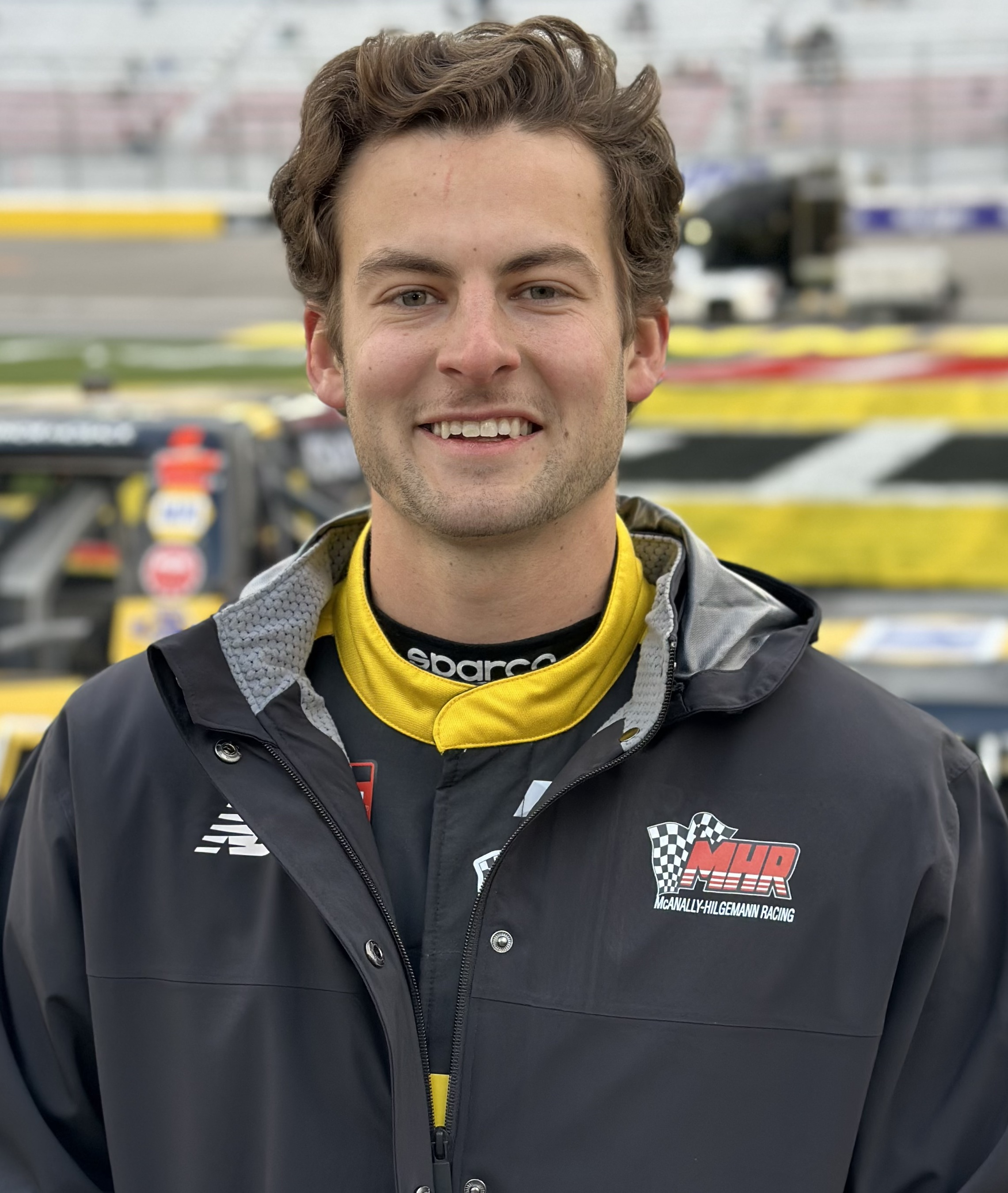
- Mosack at Las Vegas Motor Speedway in 2025
- Born: Charles Connor Mosack; January 20, 1999 (age 27); Charlotte, North Carolina, U.S.
- Awards: 2020 CARS Late Model Stock Car Tour Rookie of the Year

NASCAR O'Reilly Auto Parts Series career
- 36 races run over 5 years
- 2026 position: 83rd
- Best finish: 28th (2023)
- First race: 2022 Pacific Office Automation 147 (Portland)
- Last race: 2026 TPG 250 (Talladega)
Wins	Top tens	Poles
0	4	0

NASCAR FedEx Freight Truck Series career
- 48 races run over 4 years
- 2026 position: 23rd
- Best finish: 14th (2025)
- First race: 2022 O'Reilly Auto Parts 150 (Mid-Ohio)
- Last race: 2026 Craftsman 200 (Homestead)
Wins	Top tens	Poles
0	12	2

ARCA Menards Series career
- 25 races run over 6 years
- Best finish: 16th (2022)
- First race: 2021 Henry Ford Health System 200 (Michigan)
- Last race: 2026 Ashley Furniture 150 (Chicagoland)
- First win: 2023 Sioux Chief Fast Track 150 (Kansas)
- Last win: 2026 Ashley Furniture 150 (Chicagoland)
Wins	Top tens	Poles
3	18	2

ARCA Menards Series East career
- 6 races run over 3 years
- Best finish: 23rd (2022)
- First race: 2021 General Tire 125 (Dover)
- Last race: 2025 LiUNA! 150 (IRP)
Wins	Top tens	Poles
0	5	0

ARCA Menards Series West career
- 3 races run over 2 years
- Best finish: 37th (2022)
- First race: 2022 General Tire 150 (Phoenix)
- Last race: 2024 General Tire 150 (Phoenix)
Wins	Top tens	Poles
0	3	0
- Statistics up to date as of November 7, 2026.

Charles Connor Mosack (born January 20, 1999) is an American professional stock car racing driver. He last competed part-time in the NASCAR Craftsman Truck Series, driving the No. 7 Chevrolet Silverado RST for Spire Motorsports, part-time in the NASCAR O'Reilly Auto Parts Series, driving the No. 43 Chevrolet Camaro SS for SPS Racing, and part-time in the ARCA Menards Series, driving the No. 28 Chevrolet SS for Pinnacle Racing Group. He has previously competed in the ARCA Menards Series East and ARCA Menards Series West.

== Racing career ==
=== Early career ===
After participating in an on-track Mario Andretti Racing Experience at Charlotte Motor Speedway, Mosack began his racing career in 2017 in the INEX U.S. Legend Car ranks. Entering his first full season in 2018 at the age of nineteen, he needed just four races to earn his first victory, taking the fourth of five events in the 2018 Winter Nationals at Florida’s Citrus County Speedway.

Racing in the Semi-Pro and Open Divisions, Mosack competed at North Carolina’s Concord Speedway, the Summer Shootout Series at Charlotte Motor Speedway, and Las Vegas Motor Speedway, among other events. In 42 starts, Mosack earned twenty victories, 34 top-fives, and 37 top-ten finishes. Among those was a sweep of the National events at Las Vegas, including the Road Course World Finals and Asphalt Nationals.

In 2019, Mosack raced Late Models at Hickory Motor Speedway, finishing third in points and taking top rookie honors. He earned seven top-five and 25 top-ten finishes in 27 starts at the venue.

=== CARS Solid Rock Carriers Tour/Late Model Racing ===
In 2019, Mosack made his CARS Tour debut in the season finale at South Boston Speedway for JR Motorsports, and he would finish 12th.

In 2020, Mosack signed with JR Motorsports to run full-time in the CARS Tour. He was able to pick up three top-fives, eight top-tens, and Rookie of the Year honors as he finished sixth in points in a season shortened to only ten races due to the COVID-19 pandemic. His performance earned him a spot in the Drivers Edge Development Program presented by Chevrolet, an elite program selecting only six drivers for mentorship and development.

In 2021, Mosack would have a reduced Late Model schedule, only running three races in the CARS Tour and also running the Snowball Derby in addition to a few regional events.

In 2022, Mosack only ran three races again in the CARS Tour.

In 2023, Mosack ran in select Late Model races in addition to his NASCAR and Trans-Am schedule.

=== ARCA Menards Series ===
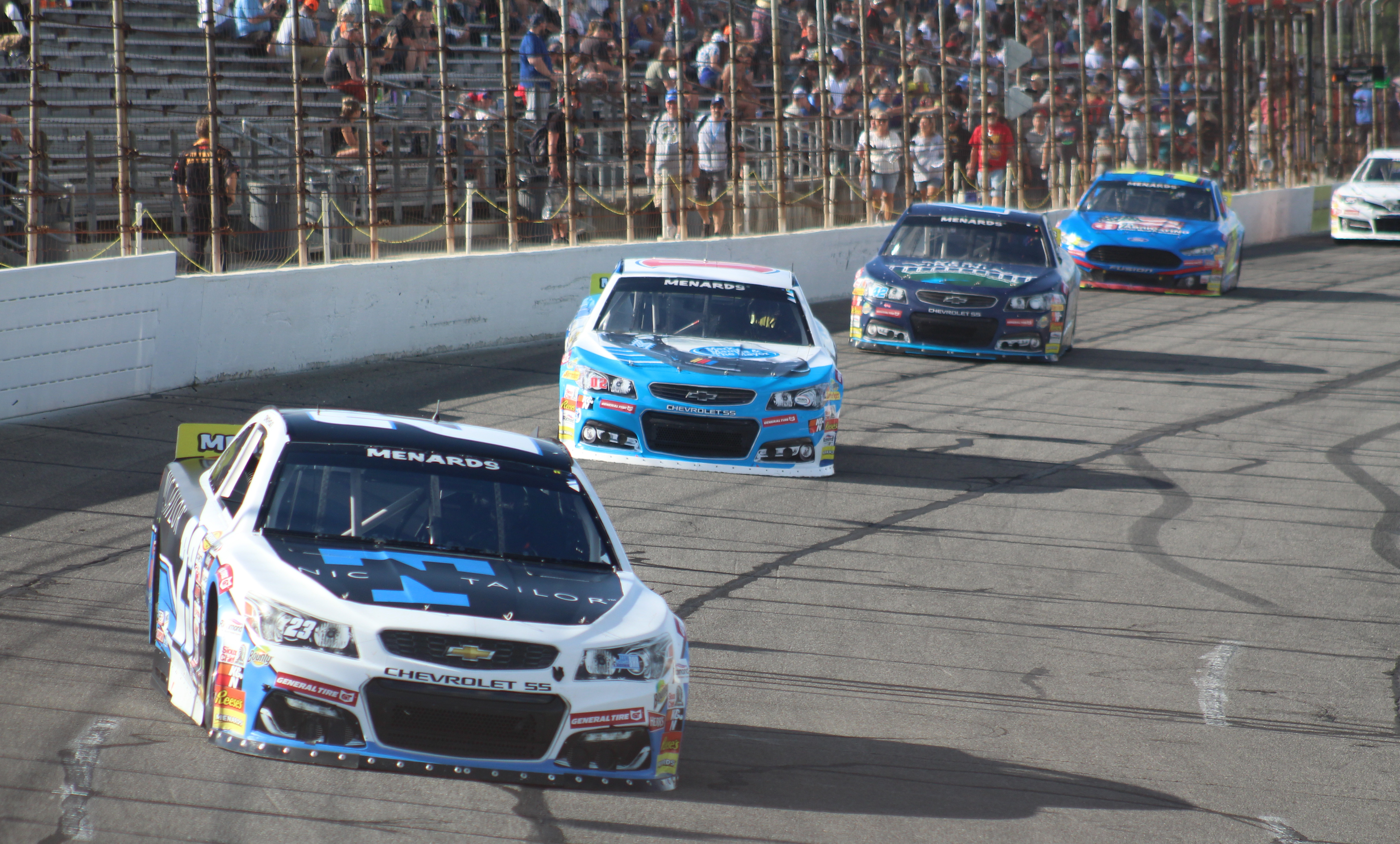
Mosack leading a group of cars at Lucas Oil Indianapolis Raceway Park in 2022

Mosack was tapped to drive the No. 02 for Young's Motorsports on May 10, 2021, for three ARCA Menards Series races that year. Mosack would first make his debut at the 2021 Henry Ford Health System 200, ultimately retiring due to a fuel pump problem and finishing sixteenth. He would make two more starts that season, finishing with a best of eleventh at the 2021 Reese's 150.

In 2022, Mosack was announced to drive in ten races for Bret Holmes Racing.

In 2023, Mosack joined Joe Gibbs Racing for a six-race slate, running at larger tracks where their primary driver, William Sawalich, was unable to race at due to his age. Mosack scored his first career ARCA win at Kansas Speedway, holding off Carson Kvapil in the final few laps. Mosack followed up with his second ARCA win at Kansas, driving for his family-owned team.

=== ARCA Menards Series East ===
Mosack would make his debut in the ARCA Menards Series East in the 2021 General Tire 125, driving the No. 02 for Young's Motorsports, finishing seventh. He would make one more start in the 2021 season, in a combination race with the ARCA Menards Series, finishing sixteenth.

=== Trans Am TA2 Series ===
Mosack competed in a full season of Trans Am in the TA2 class for Scott Lagasse Racing in 2021. In fourteen starts, he had ten top-fives, six podiums, and two wins at Watkins Glen. He competed for another full season in 2022.

=== NASCAR Xfinity Series ===
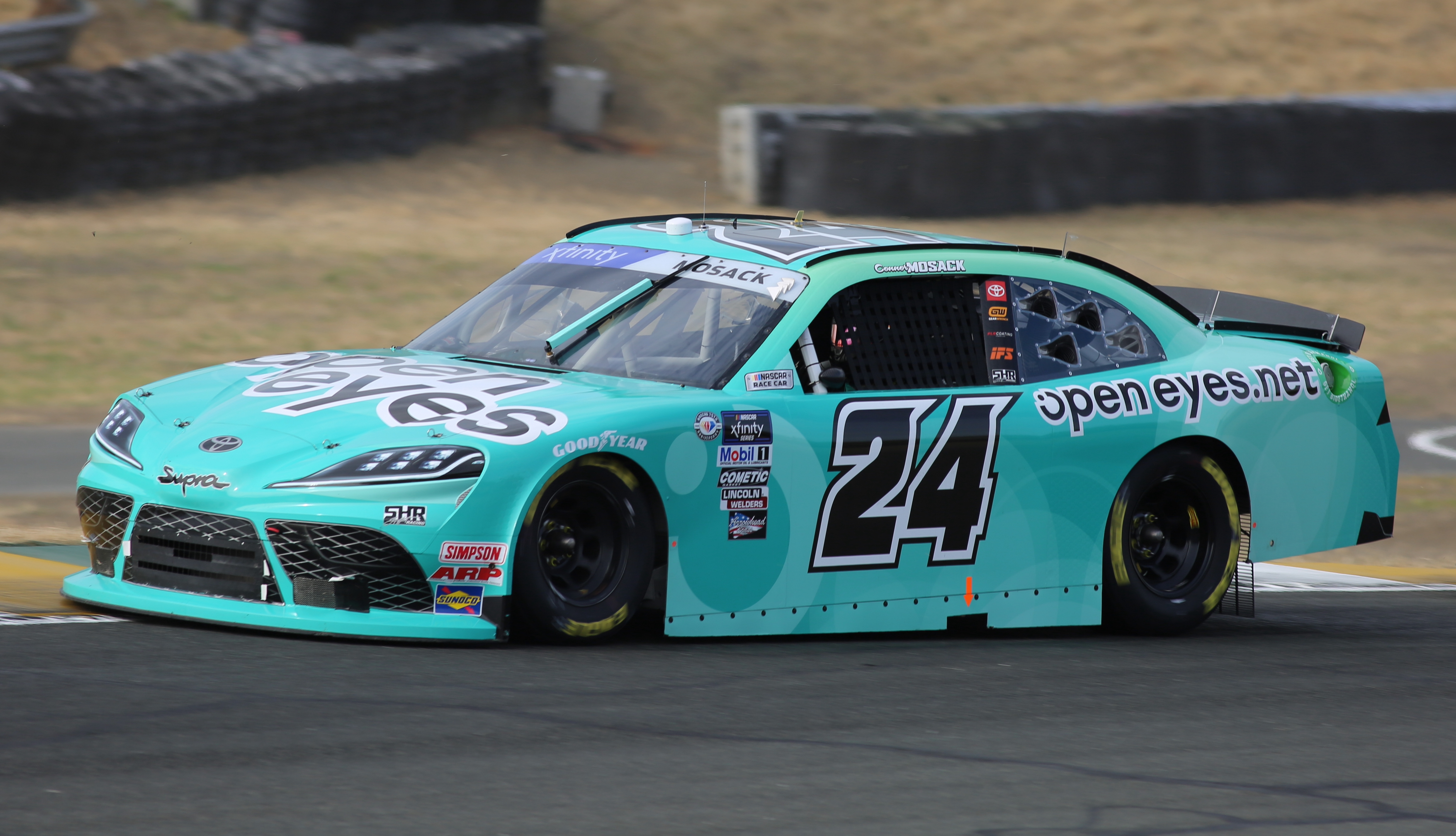
Mosack's No. 24 car at Sonoma Raceway in 2023

On May 25, 2022, Joe Gibbs Racing announced that Mosack would make his Xfinity Series debut in their No. 18 car in the road course race at Portland. Mosack was announced as the driver for Sam Hunt Racing's No. 26 car at Watkins Glen International.

Mosack returned to Sam Hunt Racing in 2023, running a majority of the season in the team's No. 24 car. He also returned to JGR for three races in the No. 19, with two races ending in DNFs. Mosack ran 24 races and earned a best finish of fifth at Watkins Glen. He ended the season 28th in points.

=== NASCAR Craftsman Truck Series ===
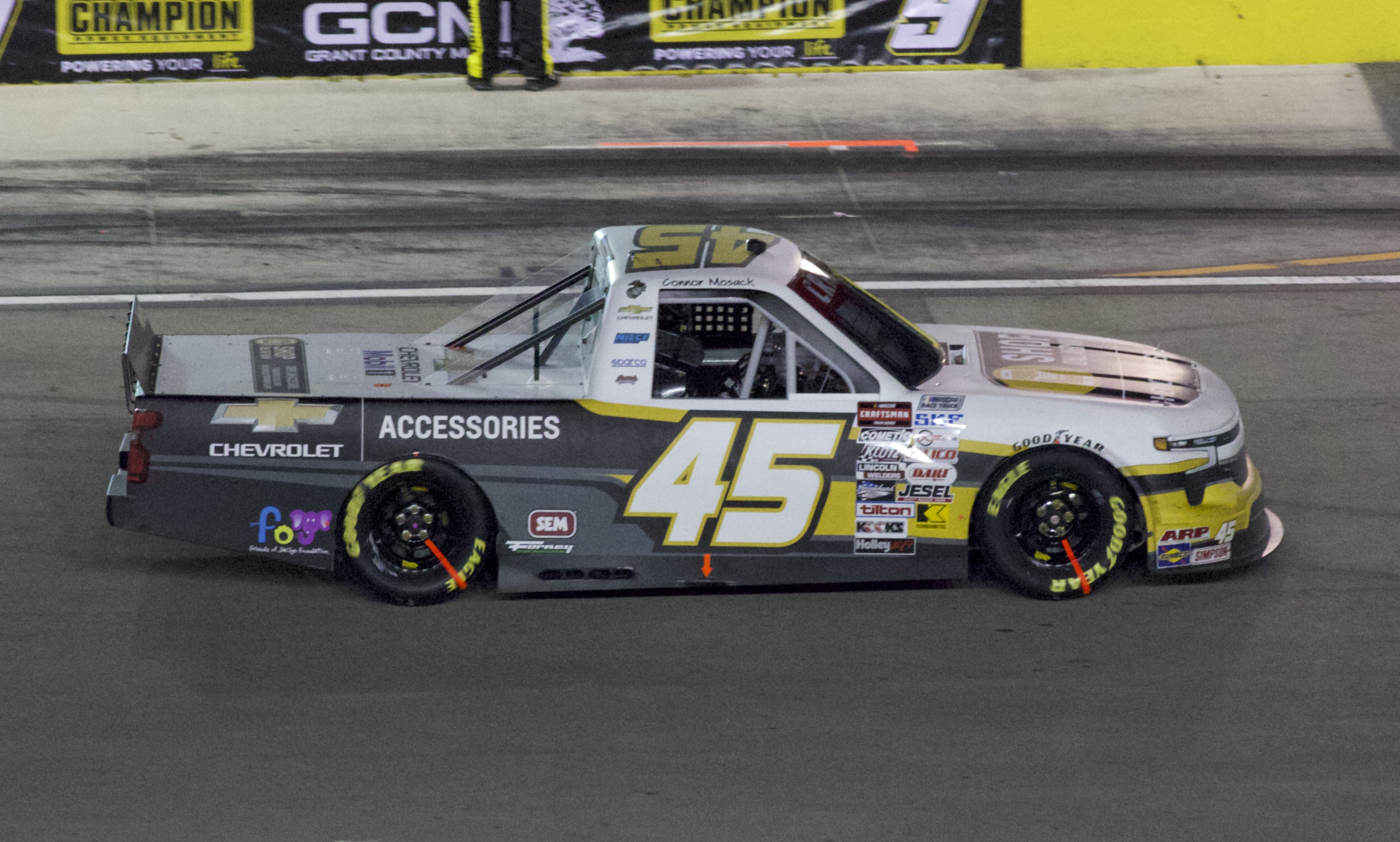
Mosack's No. 45 truck at Las Vegas Motor Speedway in 2024.

On June 30, 2022, Bret Holmes Racing announced that Mosack would make his Truck Series debut in the team's No. 32 truck in the race at Mid-Ohio Sports Car Course.

In 2024, it was announced that Mosack would run a partial schedule with Niece Motorsports in the No. 45 Chevrolet. Later that same year, it was announced that Mosack would also run additional races with Spire Motorsports. Across nine starts in 2024, Mosack finished with one top-five finish, four top-ten finishes, and a podium finish at Homestead-Miami Speedway.

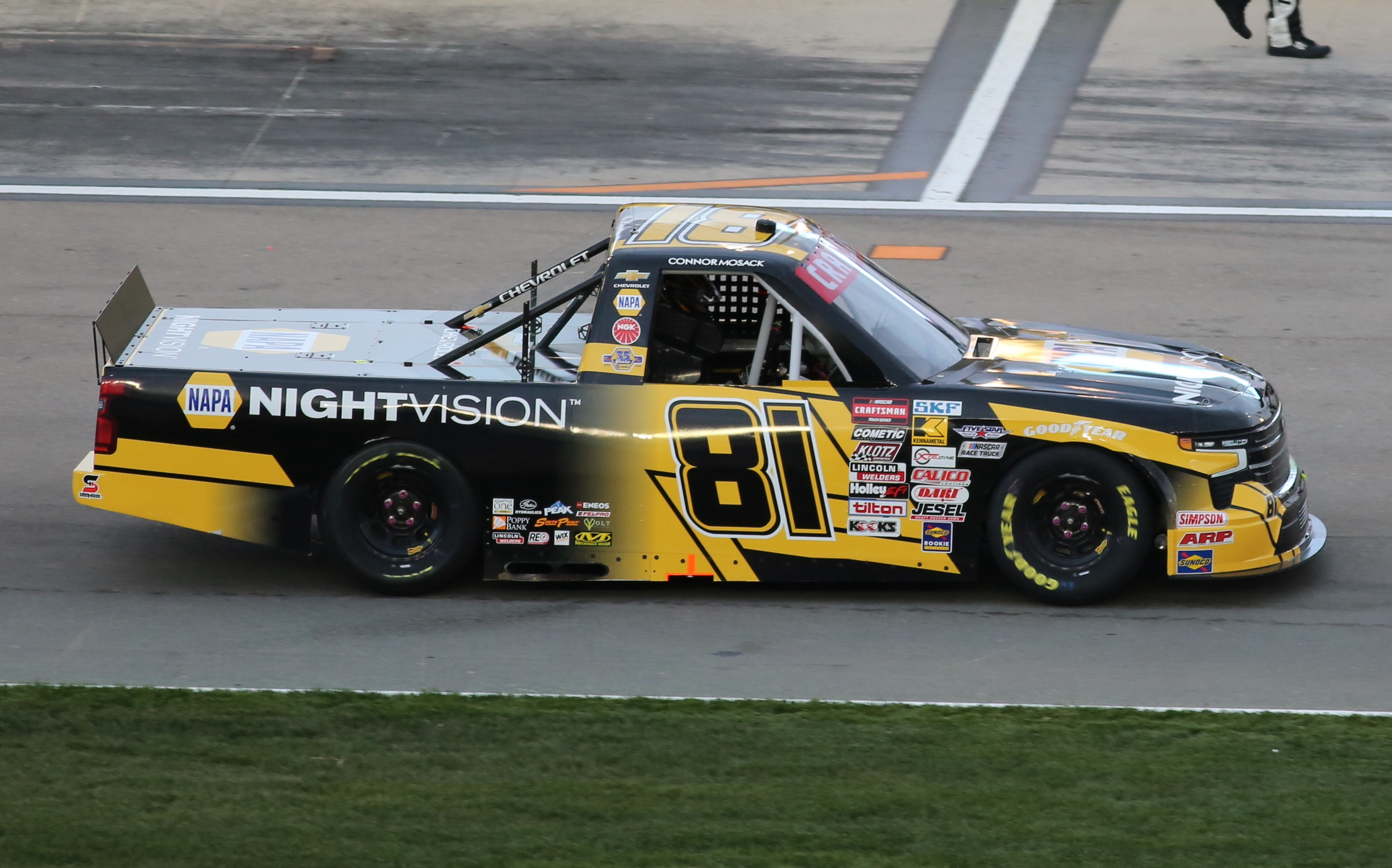
Mosack's No. 81 truck at Las Vegas Motor Speedway in 2025

On December 3, 2024, McAnally–Hilgemann Racing announced that Mosack would drive their No. 81 truck full-time in 2025. On February 21, 2025, Mosack scored his first career NCTS pole for the race at Atlanta. In 2026, Mosack ran 12 races for Spire Motorsports and finished runner-up at IRP. Mosack also scored his second Truck Series Pole at Charlotte in a Kyle Busch tribute scheme.

== Personal life ==
Mosack graduated from High Point University with a degree in business entrepreneurship in 2021.

== Motorsports career results ==
=== Racing career summary ===
Season	Series	Team	Races	Wins	Top 5	Top 10	Points	Position
2019	CARS Late Model Stock Car Tour	JR Motorsports	1	0	0	0	21	48th
2020	CARS Late Model Stock Car Tour	JR Motorsports	10	0	3	8	245	6th
2021	CARS Late Model Stock Car Tour	Dexter Canipe	2	0	0	1	55	22nd
2021	CARS Late Model Stock Car Tour	R&S Race Cars	1	0	0	0	55	22nd
2021	ARCA Menards Series East	Young's Motorsports	2	0	0	1	65	24th
2021	ARCA Menards Series	Young's Motorsports	3	0	0	0	89	42nd
2021	Trans-Am Series - TA2	N/A	11	1	7	7	218	**3rd**
2022	CARS Late Model Stock Car Tour	Carroll Speedshop	3	0	0	2	65	31st
2022	ARCA Menards Series West	McGowan Motorsports	1	0	1	1	77	37th
2022	ARCA Menards Series West	Bret Holmes Racing	1	0	0	1	77	37th
2022	ARCA Menards Series East	Bret Holmes Racing	2	0	1	2	76	23rd
2022	ARCA Menards Series	Bret Holmes Racing	8	0	4	7	296	16th
2022	NASCAR Camping World Truck Series	Bret Holmes Racing	2	0	0	0	9	69th
2022	NASCAR Xfinity Series	Joe Gibbs Racing	1	0	0	0	0	NC†
2022	NASCAR Xfinity Series	Sam Hunt Racing	1	0	0	0	0	NC†
2022	Trans-Am Series - TA2	N/A	12	1	6	7	227	4th
2023	ARCA Menards Series	Joe Gibbs Racing	6	1	5	6	253	18th
2023	NASCAR Xfinity Series	Joe Gibbs Racing	3	0	0	0	270	28th
2023	NASCAR Xfinity Series	Sam Hunt Racing	21	0	1	2	270	28th
2023	Trans-Am Series - TA2	N/A	3	0	1	2	190	29th
2024	CARS Late Model Stock Car Tour	Carroll Speedshop	1	0	0	0	0	N/A
2024	CARS Late Model Stock Car Tour	Derek Peebles Motorsports	1	0	0	0	0	N/A
2024	CARS Late Model Stock Car Tour	Pinnacle Racing Group	1	0	0	1	0	N/A
2024	ARCA Menards Series West	Pinnacle Racing Group	1	0	1	1	40	40th
2024	ARCA Menards Series	Pinnacle Racing Group	4	1	2	2	176	25th
2024	ARCA Menards Series	Sigma Performance Services	1	0	1	1	176	25th
2024	NASCAR Craftsman Truck Series	Spire Motorsports	6	0	1	4	227	28th
2024	NASCAR Craftsman Truck Series	Niece Motorsports	3	0	0	0	227	28th
2024	NASCAR Xfinity Series	JR Motorsports	2	0	0	1	0	NC†
2025	ARCA Menards Series East	Pinnacle Racing Group	2	0	1	2	79	29th
2025	ARCA Menards Series	Pinnacle Racing Group	1	0	0	1	38	94th
2025	NASCAR Craftsman Truck Series	McAnally-Hilgemann Racing	25	0	0	4	515	14th
2025	NASCAR Xfinity Series	SS-Green Light Racing	2	0	0	0	0	NC†
2025	NASCAR Xfinity Series	JR Motorsports	1	0	1	1	0	NC†
2025	NASCAR Xfinity Series	Viking Motorsports	3	0	0	0	0	NC†
2025	Trans-Am Series - TA2	N/A	1	0	0	1	76	35th
2026	ARCA Menards Series	Pinnacle Racing Group	2	1	2	2	90	48th
2026	NASCAR Craftsman Truck Series	Spire Motorsports	12	0	2	4	290	23rd
2026	NASCAR O'Reilly Auto Parts Series	SPS Racing	2	0	0	0	0	NC†

^{†} As Mosack was a guest driver, he was ineligible for championship points.

=== NASCAR ===
(key) (Bold – Pole position awarded by qualifying time. Italics – Pole position earned by points standings or practice time. * – Most laps led.)

==== O'Reilly Auto Parts Series ====
NASCAR O'Reilly Auto Parts Series results
Year	Team	No.	Make	1	2	3	4	5	6	7	8	9	10	11	12	13	14	15	16	17	18	19	20	21	22	23	24	25	26	27	28	29	30	31	32	33	NOAPSC	Pts	Ref
2022	Joe Gibbs Racing	18	Toyota	DAY	CAL	LVS	PHO	ATL	COA	RCH	MAR	TAL	DOV	DAR	TEX	CLT	PIR; 28	NSH	ROA	ATL	NHA	POC	IRC	MCH													95th	0^{1}	
2022	Sam Hunt Racing	26	Toyota																						GLN; 15	DAY	DAR	KAN	BRI	TEX	TAL	ROV	LVS	HOM	MAR	PHO	95th	0^{1}	
2023	Sam Hunt Racing	24	Toyota	DAY	CAL	LVS	PHO; 24	ATL; 30	COA; 19	RCH; 28	MAR; 33	TAL	DOV	DAR	CLT; 23	PIR; 8	SON; 32	NSH; 35			NHA; 26			MCH; 36	IRC; 26	GLN; 5	DAY; 37	DAR	KAN; 14	BRI; 14	TEX	ROV; 24	LVS; 19	HOM; 31	MAR; 31	PHO; 34	28th	270	
2023	Joe Gibbs Racing	19	Toyota																CSC; 35	ATL		POC; 34	ROA; 29														28th	270	
2024	JR Motorsports	88	Chevy	DAY	ATL	LVS	PHO	COA	RCH	MAR	TEX	TAL	DOV	DAR	CLT	PIR	SON	IOW	NHA	NSH	CSC; 6	POC	IND	MCH	DAY	DAR	ATL	GLN	BRI	KAN	TAL	ROV; 18	LVS	HOM	MAR	PHO	87th	0^{1}	
2025	SS-Green Light Racing with BRK Racing	14	Chevy	DAY	ATL	COA	PHO	LVS	HOM	MAR	DAR	BRI	ROC	TAL	TEX	CLT	NSH	MXC	POC	ATL	CSC; 26	SON; 33	DOV	IND	IOW	GLN	DAY	PIR	GTW	BRI	KAN						84th	0^{1}	
2025	JR Motorsports	9	Chevy																													ROV; 5	LVS				84th	0^{1}	
2025	Viking Motorsports	99	Chevy																															TAL; 28	MAR; 25	PHO; 22	84th	0^{1}	
2026	SPS Racing	43	Chevy	DAY	ATL	COA	PHO	LVS	DAR	MAR	ROC	BRI	KAN	TAL	TEX	GLN	DOV	CLT	NSH	POC	COR	SON	CHI	ATL	IND	IOW	DAY	DAR	GTW	BRI	LVS	CLT	PHO; 30	TAL; 19	MAR	HOM	83rd	0^{1}	

==== Craftsman Truck Series ====
NASCAR Craftsman Truck Series results
Year	Team	No.	Make	1	2	3	4	5	6	7	8	9	10	11	12	13	14	15	16	17	18	19	20	21	22	23	24	25	NCTC	Pts	Ref
2022	Bret Holmes Racing	32	Chevy	DAY	LVS	ATL	COA	MAR	BRD	DAR	KAN	TEX	CLT	GTW	SON	KNX	NSH	MOH; 34	POC	IRP	RCH	KAN	BRI; 31	TAL	HOM	PHO			69th	9	
2024	Spire Motorsports	7	Chevy								KAN; 30	DAR	NWS	CLT; 8			POC; 15	IRP	RCH	MLW		KAN; 10	TAL	HOM; 3	MAR	PHO; 8			28th	227	
2024	Niece Motorsports	45	Chevy	DAY	ATL	LVS; 19	BRI	COA	MAR	TEX					GTW; 22	NSH													28th	227	
2024	Niece Motorsports	41	Chevy																		BRI; 20								28th	227	
2025	McAnally–Hilgemann Racing	81	Chevy	DAY; 32	**ATL**; 25	LVS; 20	HOM; 19	MAR; 25	BRI; 24	ROC; 9	TEX; 22	KAN; 18	NWS; 16	CLT; 23	NSH; 23	MCH; 19	POC; 6	LRP; 16	IRP; 17	GLN; 16	RCH; 18	DAR; 13	BRI; 7	NHA; 36	ROV; 10	TAL; 14	MAR; 30	PHO; 26	14th	515	
2026	Spire Motorsports	7	Chevy	DAY	ATL	STP; 13	DAR; 5	ROC	BRI	TEX	GLN; 10	DOV	CLT	NSH	MCH; 8	COR; 24	LRP; 18	NWS	IRP; 2	RCH	NHA; 30	BRI; 25	KAN	**CLT**; 33	PHO; 11	TAL	MAR	HOM; 16	23rd	290	

^{*} Season still in progress
^{1} Ineligible for series points

=== ARCA Menards Series ===
(key) (Bold – Pole position awarded by qualifying time. Italics – Pole position earned by points standings or practice time. * – Most laps led.)

ARCA Menards Series results
Year	Team	No.	Make	1	2	3	4	5	6	7	8	9	10	11	12	13	14	15	16	17	18	19	20	AMSC	Pts	Ref
2021	Young's Motorsports	02	Chevy	DAY	PHO	TAL	KAN	TOL	CLT	MOH	POC	ELK	BLN	IOW	WIN	GLN	MCH; 16	ISF	MLW; 16	DSF	BRI	SLM	KAN; 11	42nd	89	
2022	Bret Holmes Racing	23	Chevy	DAY	PHO; 10	TAL	KAN; 5	CLT; 4	IOW; 3	BLN	ELK	MOH	POC; 6	IRP; 5	MCH	GLN; 16	ISF	MLW	DSF	KAN	BRI; 9	SLM	TOL	16th	296	
2023	Joe Gibbs Racing	18	Toyota	**DAY**; 2*	PHO	TAL	KAN; 4	CLT; 9	BLN	ELK	MOH	IOW	POC; 2	MCH; 3	IRP	GLN	ISF	MLW	DSF	KAN; 1*	BRI	SLM	TOL	18th	253	
2024	Pinnacle Racing Group	28	Chevy	DAY	PHO; 4	TAL	DOV	KAN; 1	CLT; 27	IOW	**MOH**; 13	BLN	IRP	SLM	ELK	MCH	ISF	MLW	DSF					25th	176	
2024	Sigma Performance Services	23	Chevy																	GLN; 5	BRI	KAN	TOL	25th	176	
2025	Pinnacle Racing Group	82	Chevy	DAY	PHO	TAL	KAN	CLT	MCH	BLN	ELK	LRP	DOV	IRP; 6	IOW	GLN	ISF	MAD	DSF	BRI	SLM	KAN	TOL	94th	38	
2026	Pinnacle Racing Group	28	Chevy	DAY	PHO	KAN	TAL	GLN	TOL	MCH; 4*	POC	BER	ELK	CHI; 1*	LRP	IRP	IOW	ISF	MAD	DSF	SLM	BRI	KAN	48th	90	

==== ARCA Menards Series East ====
ARCA Menards Series East results
Year	Team	No.	Make	1	2	3	4	5	6	7	8	AMSEC	Pts	Ref
2021	Young's Motorsports	02	Chevy	NSM	FIF	NSV	DOV; 7	SNM	IOW	MLW; 16	BRI	24th	65	
2022	Bret Holmes Racing	23	Chevy	NSM	FIF	DOV	NSV	IOW; 3	MLW	BRI; 9		23rd	76	
2025	Pinnacle Racing Group	28	Chevy	FIF; 4	CAR	NSV	FRS	DOV				29th	79	
2025	Pinnacle Racing Group	82	Chevy						IRP; 6	IOW	BRI	29th	79	

==== ARCA Menards Series West ====
ARCA Menards Series West results
Year	Team	No.	Make	1	2	3	4	5	6	7	8	9	10	11	12	AMSWC	Pts	Ref
2022	Bret Holmes Racing	23	Chevy	PHO; 10	IRW	KCR										37th	77	
2022	McGowan Motorsports	17	Chevy				PIR; 2	SON	IRW	EVG	PIR	AAS	LVS	PHO		37th	77	
2024	Pinnacle Racing Group	28	Chevy	PHO; 4	KER	PIR	SON	IRW	IRW	SHA	TRI	MAD	AAS	KER	PHO	40th	40	

=== CARS Late Model Stock Car Tour ===
(key) (Bold – Pole position awarded by qualifying time. Italics – Pole position earned by points standings or practice time. * – Most laps led. ** – All laps led.)

CARS Late Model Stock Car Tour results
Year	Team	No.	Make	1	2	3	4	5	6	7	8	9	10	11	12	13	14	15	16	17	CLMSCTC	Pts	Ref
2019	JR Motorsports	89	Chevy	SNM	HCY	ROU	ACE	MMS	LGY	DOM	CCS	HCY	ROU	SBO; 12							48th	21	
2020	JR Motorsports	8	Chevy	SNM; 3	ACE; 11	HCY; 10															6th	245	
2020	JR Motorsports	88	Chevy				HCY; 7	DOM; 8	FCS; 3	LGY; 8	CCS; 4	FLO; 21	GRE; 10								6th	245	
2021	Dexter Canipe	5	Chevy	DIL	HCY	OCS	ACE	CRW	LGY	DOM	HCY; 18	MMS	TCM	FLC; 9	WKS						22nd	55	
2021	R&S Race Cars	26	Toyota													SBO; 17					22nd	55	
2022	Carroll Speedshop	28	Toyota	CRW	HCY	GRE	AAS	FCS; 7	LGY	DOM	HCY	ACE									31st	65	
2022	Carroll Speedshop	28	Chevy										MMS; 9	NWS; 18	TCM	ACE	SBO	CRW			31st	65	
2024	Carroll Speedshop	57	Chevy	SNM	HCY	AAS	OCS; 21	ACE	TCM	LGY	DOM	CRW	HCY								N/A	0	
2024	Derek Peebles Motorsports	28	Chevy											NWS; 27	ACE	WCS	FLC	SBO	TCM		N/A	0	
2024	Pinnacle Racing Group	82	Chevy																	NWS; 6	N/A	0	
