= Chicago Street Course =

Racetrack in Chicago, Illinois, US

- Street Circuit (2023–2025)
- Location: Chicago, Illinois
- Coordinates: 41°52′33″N 87°37′14″W
- Opened: July 1, 2023; 3 years ago
- Closed: July 6, 2025; 14 months ago
- Major events: Former: NASCAR Cup Series; Grant Park 165 (2023–2025); NASCAR Xfinity Series; The Loop 110 (2023–2025)

Street Circuit (2023–2025)
- Surface: Asphalt
- Length: 2.140 mi (3.444 km)
- Turns: 12
- Race lap record: 1:29.720 ( (New Zealand) Shane van Gisbergen, Chevrolet Camaro ZL1, 2024, NASCAR Cup)

The Chicago Street Course was a 2.140 mi (3.444 km) street circuit in Grant Park in the city of Chicago, Illinois, United States. The course hosted the NASCAR Cup Series and NASCAR Xfinity Series, with the first races run on July 1–2, 2023. The track was initially a conceptual track on iRacing made for the eNASCAR iRacing Pro Invitational Series in 2021.

== History ==
On March 24, 2021, NASCAR announced that an imaginary street course in the Chicago Loop in Downtown Chicago would be the track for the fifth and final race of the 2021 eNASCAR iRacing Pro Invitational Series. The iRacing event was broadcast live on NASCAR on Fox on June 2, 2021. NASCAR was rumored to be in exploratory conversations with city officials around opening a real version of the virtual course as early as March 2021.

On July 19, 2022, the Grant Park 220 was announced as part of the 2023 NASCAR Cup Series, replacing the Kwik Trip 250 at Road America. A 2023 IMSA SportsCar Championship race event was simultaneously announced to fill out the 2023 race weekend, but was later cancelled and replaced with a 2023 NASCAR Xfinity Series event. Following the announcement, Chicago mayor Lori Lightfoot faced criticism from Chicago City Council members who claimed to have been left out of the negotiations, including Alderman Brendan Reilly, who represents the 42nd Ward where the course is located.

NASCAR was reported to have negotiated a $500,000 flat fee for the course, plus an additional $2 per ticket sold to the event and 15% of all merchandise, food, and beverage sales. The permit fee was reported to be far lower than the fees for similar major events involving the closure of Grant Park such as Lollapalooza.

Residents critical of the event expressed concerns over the closure of major roads and Grant Park over the Independence Day weekend, noise from the event, and the potential danger to nearby residences and the Art Institute of Chicago. Leading up to the races, NASCAR hosted a number of promotional events with city institutions and neighborhood groups. NASCAR also worked with the Art Institute to ensure that there was no risk to the museum's collections.

On July 1, 2023, the course hosted its first official race, the 2023 The Loop 121. The 2023 Grant Park 220 took place on the following day, July 2. Both races were shortened due to thunderstorms which persisted throughout the weekend. Concerts scheduled as part of the race weekend event, including performances from The Chainsmokers and Miranda Lambert, were canceled due to the weather.

Chicago's contract with NASCAR was scheduled to cover three years and last through 2025. Chicago mayor Brandon Johnson, who defeated Lightfoot in the 2023 Chicago mayoral election, stated on July 3, 2023 that the course's future remains under evaluation and that community input is being sought. After the 2025 race weekend, Mayor Johnson's administration stated they are willing to extend the contract for a further two years, but only after exploring a date change. Event officials announced on X that the race would be removed from the 2026 schedule.

== Track layout ==
The circuit was a 2.140 mi (3.444 km) loop through Grant Park, starting and ending on Columbus Drive in front of Buckingham Fountain and including portions of Columbus Drive, Balbo Drive, Jean Baptiste Pointe du Sable Lake Shore Drive, Roosevelt Road, Michigan Avenue, Congress Plaza Drive, and Jackson Drive. The course consisted of 12 total turns and two bridge crossings over Metra Electric District tracks. The layout was similar to the version used in 2021 for the eNASCAR iRacing Pro Invitational Series, with minor differences in the lanes that are used in turns 4, 5, 10, and 11.

As a street course, the track was a temporary fixture along roads normally open to regular traffic. The roads the track covers and nearby roads were closed several days in advance of scheduled races to allow for the preparation of the track. Roads that were closed for the course fully reopened within two weeks following the races. The course was first opened for the weekend of July 1–2, 2023.

== Course records ==
=== Qualifying records ===
- NASCAR Cup Series Qualifying: (United States) Kyle Larson, 1:27.518s (145.111 mph), July 6, 2024
- NASCAR Xfinity Series Qualifying: (New Zealand) Shane van Gisbergen, 1:29.448s (142.496 mph), July 6, 2024

=== Race lap records ===
As of July 2024, the fastest official race lap records at the course are listed as:

Category	Time	Driver	Vehicle	Event
Street Circuit (2023–2025): 2.140 mi (3.444 km)
NASCAR Cup	1:29.720	Shane van Gisbergen	Chevrolet Camaro ZL1	2024 Grant Park 165
NASCAR Xfinity	1:30.879	Shane van Gisbergen	Chevrolet Camaro SS	2024 The Loop 110
