= Grant Park 165 =

NASCAR Cup Series race at the Chicago Street Course

NASCAR Cup Series
- Venue: Chicago Street Course
- Location: Chicago, Illinois
- Corporate sponsor: Blue Cross Blue Shield of Illinois (BCBSI)
- First race: 2023
- Last race: 2025
- Distance: 165 miles (265.542 km)
- Previous names: Grant Park 220 (2023)
- Most wins (driver): Shane van Gisbergen (2)
- Most wins (team): Trackhouse Racing (2)
- Most wins (manufacturer): Chevrolet (3)

Circuit information
- Surface: Asphalt
- Length: 2.200 mi (3.541 km)
- Turns: 12

The Grant Park 165 was an annual NASCAR Cup Series race held on the Chicago Street Course, a street circuit in Grant Park, Chicago, Illinois, United States. The race was first held in 2023 and was the first ever street race contested in the NASCAR Cup Series. The NASCAR Xfinity Series also held a race on the street course on the day before the Cup Series race.

Shane van Gisbergen is the final winner of the race.

== History ==
=== Background ===
On March 24, 2021, NASCAR announced that an imaginary street course in the Chicago Loop in Downtown Chicago would be the track for the fifth (and what turned out to be the final) race of the 2021 eNASCAR iRacing Pro Invitational Series. The iRacing event was broadcast live on NASCAR on Fox on Wednesday, June 2. Rick Ware Racing Cup Series driver James Davison would win the virtual Chicago street race. Ever since the announcement of the track's virtual creation for this iRacing event, there had been rumors and speculation that NASCAR would like to make this track a reality and have a street race in Chicago on the Cup Series schedule in the future. On July 7, 2022, Jordan Bianchi from The Athletic reported that an official announcement of a Chicago street race being added to the Cup Series schedule would come on July 19. On June 17, Adam Stern from Sports Business Journal suggested that the Chicago Street Course could replace Road America on the 2023 Cup Series schedule as any street course race would likely replace one of the road course races and Road America did not have a contract to have a Cup Series race in 2023. On July 19, the official announcement of the addition of the Chicago street race to the Cup Series schedule took place. After the announcement, NASCAR executive Ben Kennedy confirmed Stern's report of the Chicago street race replacing the race at Road America on the Cup Series schedule in a question and answer session with the media.

On March 7, 2023, NASCAR announced that the race would not have a title sponsor and would instead be named after Grant Park, which the street course will pass by. Similarly, the Xfinity Series race was named The Loop 121 after the Chicago Loop, the area of the city in which the street course is located. It was also announced on that day that the Cup Series race would be 220 miles and 100 laps in length.

The inaugural running of the event was held during a rain storm. The start of the race was delayed, and eventually ran for only 78 of the scheduled laps. New Zealand racing driver Shane van Gisbergen and triple Australian Supercars champion won the event. in his first-ever NASCAR race running for Trackhouse Racing's PROJECT91 program after qualifying in third. He also became the first driver to win in his Cup Series debut since Johnny Rutherford in 1963. Following the race win, van Gisbergen left Supercars in 2024 and came to the United States to race full-time in NASCAR. He later would join the Cup Series full time in 2025.

On October 20, 2023, NASCAR announced that the Cup Series would be shortened from 220 miles (354.056 km) and 100 laps to 165 miles (265.542) and 75 laps. This is a bit shorter than the length of the rain and darkness-shortened 2023 race, which was 171.6 miles and 78 laps long.

On July 18, 2025, officials of the race would announce that it would not return in 2026, with a potential to return in 2027.

== Past winners ==
Year	Date	No.	Driver	Team	Manufacturer	Race Distance		Race Time	Average Speed (mph)	Report	Ref
Year	Date	No.	Driver	Team	Manufacturer	Laps	Miles (km)	Race Time	Average Speed (mph)	Report	Ref
2023	July 2	91	Shane van Gisbergen	Trackhouse Racing	Chevrolet	78*	171.6 (276.163)	2:50:48	60.281	Report	
2024	July 7	48	Alex Bowman	Hendrick Motorsports	Chevrolet	58*	127.6 (205.351)	2:19:24	54.921	Report	
2025	July 6	88	Shane van Gisbergen	Trackhouse Racing	Chevrolet	75	165 (265.542)	2:28:17	66.764	Report	

=== Notes ===
- 2023: Race shortened to 78 laps due to darkness following a rain delay, but extended due to NASCAR overtime.
- 2024: Race shortened to 58 laps due to darkness following a rain delay.

=== Multiple winners (drivers) ===
# wins	Driver	Years won
2	Shane van Gisbergen	2023, 2025

=== Multiple winners (teams) ===
# wins	Team	Years won
2	Trackhouse Racing	2023,2025

=== Manufacturer wins ===
# wins	Manufacturer	Years won
3	Chevrolet	2023–2025

== See also ==
- 1956 NASCAR Grand National Series race at Soldier Field – a previous NASCAR Cup Series race held in the city of Chicago
