= NASCAR Cup Series at Road America =

NASCAR Cup Series race at Road America

Kwik Trip 250

NASCAR Cup Series
- Venue: Road America
- Location: Elkhart Lake, Wisconsin
- Corporate sponsor: Kwik Trip (title sponsor); Jockey International (presenting sponsor)
- First race: 1956
- Last race: 2022
- Distance: 250.48 miles (403.11 km)
- Laps: 62; Stage 1: 14; Stage 2: 15; Final stage: 33
- Previous names: International Stock Car Road Race (1956); Jockey Made in America 250 presented by Kwik Trip (2021)
- Most wins (manufacturer): Chevrolet (2)

Circuit information
- Surface: Asphalt
- Length: 4.048 mi (6.515 km)
- Turns: 14

The Kwik Trip 250 presented by Jockey Made in America was a NASCAR Cup Series race at Road America in Elkhart Lake, Wisconsin. The series first raced on the 4.048 mi (6.515 km) road course in 1956, but it did not return to the schedule until 2021 as part of Independence Day weekend. The race returned for another year in 2022 before being removed again in favor of a street race in Chicago.

The NASCAR Xfinity Series' Henry 180, which had previously been on that series' schedule as a standalone race, served as a support event to the race.

== History ==
The first, and prior to 2021 only, NASCAR Cup Series race at Road America was a 250-mile event held in 1956, when the series was known as the Grand National Series. The race, promoted as "America's First International Stock Car Road Race", was officially sanctioned by NASCAR but the Fédération Internationale de l'Automobile (FIA) provided support for the event and foreign cars were allowed entry. The FIA's Commission Sportive Internationale secretary Hubert Schroeder served as race overseer. As road racing was rare for the series at the time, speculation among fans revolved around American cars' ability to maneuver the course; the field featured 25 American vehicles, a Jaguar Mark VII, and four Renaults. The race was run on August 12; although Speedy Thompson took the lead as the leaders went through pit stops, an engine failure forced him to retire from the race and Tim Flock led the final ten laps to win. After the race, Flock remarked that "road racing is all right."

Road America began hosting NASCAR again in 2010 with the NASCAR Nationwide Series, which replaced the series' race at the Milwaukee Mile.

In June 2020, it was reported that Road America was in negotiations to host the Cup Series in 2021. When NASCAR revealed the 2021 Cup Series schedule on September 30, 2020, Road America was included on the Fourth of July weekend. Following the late addition of the O'Reilly Auto Parts 253 at Daytona International Speedway, Road America became one of seven road courses on the 2021 Cup calendar, the most in series history. Wisconsin-based Kwik Trip was announced as the presenting sponsor for the race on April 13, 2021, and the race would be called the "Road America 250 presented by Kwik Trip". However, on May 12, 2021, the clothing company Jockey, also headquartered in Wisconsin, was announced as the title sponsor for the race, which would be known as the "Jockey Made in America 250 presented by Kwik Trip."

On September 15, 2021, the track announced that Jockey and Kwik Trip would switch places in the race's sponsorship, with Kwik Trip becoming the title sponsor and Jockey becoming the presenting sponsor.

On June 17, Adam Stern from Sports Business Journal suggested that a Chicago street race could replace Road America on the schedule, as any street race added to the Cup Series schedule would likely replace one of the road course races and Road America did not have a contract to have a Cup Series race in 2023. On July 19, NASCAR officially announced both the race and the fact that it would replace Road America on the Cup Series schedule.

== Past winners ==
Year	Date	No.	Driver	Team	Manufacturer	Race distance		Race time	Average speed (mph)	Report	Ref
Year	Date	No.	Driver	Team	Manufacturer	Laps	Miles (km)	Race time	Average speed (mph)	Report	Ref
1956	August 12	15	Tim Flock	Bill Stroppe	Mercury	63	252 (405.555)	3:29:50	73.858	Report	
1957 – 2020	Not held										
2021	July 4	9	Chase Elliott	Hendrick Motorsports	Chevrolet	62	250.48 (403.131)	2:54:33	86.271	Report	
2022	July 3	8	Tyler Reddick	Richard Childress Racing	Chevrolet	62	250.48 (403.131)	2:35:51	96.622	Report	

=== Manufacturer wins ===
# Wins	Manufacturer	Years won
2	Chevrolet	2021, 2022
1	Mercury	1956
