= The Loop 110 =

Stock car race in Chicago, Illinois, US

NASCAR Xfinity Series
- Venue: Chicago Street Course
- Location: Chicago, Illinois
- Corporate sponsor: (None)
- First race: 2023
- Last race: 2025
- Distance: 110 miles (177.028 km)
- Laps: 50; Stage 1: 15; Stage 2: 15; Final stage: 20
- Previous names: The Loop 121 (2023)
- Most wins (driver): Shane van Gisbergen (2)
- Most wins (team): Stewart–Haas Racing, Kaulig Racing & JR Motorsports (1)
- Most wins (manufacturer): Chevrolet (2)

Circuit information
- Surface: Asphalt
- Length: 2.2 mi (3.5 km)
- Turns: 12

The Loop 110 was a NASCAR Xfinity Series race that is held on the Chicago Street Course, a street circuit in Chicago, Illinois. The race was first held in 2023 and was the first ever street race for the Xfinity Series. A NASCAR Cup Series race also held a race on the street course on the same weekend the day after the Xfinity Series race.

== History ==
On September 14, 2022, NASCAR announced that the Xfinity Series would have a race there when the series' schedule for 2023 was revealed. The Xfinity Series race at the Chicago Street Course replaced a planned IMSA race that was going to be held on the same weekend as the Cup Series' race there.

On March 7, 2023, NASCAR announced that the race would not have a title sponsor and would instead be named after the Chicago Loop, the area of the city in which the street course is located. Similarly, the Cup Series race was named the Grant Park 220 as the street course passes by Grant Park. It was also announced on that day that the Xfinity Series Chicago street race would be 121 miles and 55 laps in length.

The 2023 race, which was won by Cole Custer, ended up being one of few races in NASCAR history that did not go past halfway in its scheduled distance. The race had to be stopped after 25 laps on Saturday, July 1 due to rain. With the race not being halfway finished, it was scheduled to be continued on Sunday morning. When it rained again on Sunday morning and then the Cup Series race had to start on time and how the street course had to begin being dismantled on Monday, NASCAR decided to call the Xfinity Series race. It also was one of very few races in NASCAR national series history in which one driver led all the laps in the race.

On October 20, 2023, NASCAR announced that the 2024 Xfinity Series Chicago Street Race would be shortened from 121 miles (194.731 km) and 55 laps to 110 miles (177.028 km) and 50 laps.

== Past winners ==
Year	Date	No.	Driver	Team	Manufacturer	Race Distance		Race Time	Average Speed (mph)	Report	Ref
Year	Date	No.	Driver	Team	Manufacturer	Laps	Miles (km)	Race Time	Average Speed (mph)	Report	Ref
2023	July 1	00	Cole Custer	Stewart–Haas Racing	Ford	25*	53.5 (86.0999 km)	1:02:40	52.66	Report	
2024	July 6	97	Shane van Gisbergen	Kaulig Racing	Chevrolet	50	110 (177.028 km)	1:56:45	56.531	Report	
2025	July 5	9	Shane van Gisbergen	JR Motorsports	Chevrolet	50	110 (177.028 km)	1:51:52	58.999	Report	

=== Notes ===
- 2023: Race shortened to 25 laps due to rain

=== Multiple winners (drivers) ===
# Wins	Driver	Years won
2	Shane van Gisbergen	2024, 2025

=== Multiple winners (teams) ===
# Wins	Team	Years
1	Stewart–Haas Racing	2023
1	Kaulig Racing	2024
1	JR Motorsports	2025

=== Manufacturer wins ===
# Wins	Make	Years won
2	(United States) Chevrolet	2024, 2025
1	(United States) Ford	2023
