= 2021 eNASCAR iRacing Pro Invitational Series =

Second season of the eNASCAR iRacing Pro Invitational Series

The 2021 eNASCAR iRacing Pro Invitational Series was the second and final season of the eNASCAR iRacing Pro Invitational Series, a series of iRacing sim racing events originally organized for NASCAR drivers to compete in after its 2020 seasons were put on hold due to the COVID-19 pandemic.

After the success of the series, NASCAR decided to bring it back on a more permanent basis in 2021, although this time, the races, 10 in total, would be held on Wednesday nights at least once a month. Additionally, Fox, which broadcast all of the races in the series in 2020, would be joined by NBC, the other channel that broadcasts real-life NASCAR races, this season, with each channel airing five races apiece. Fox and NBC would choose the racetracks that their races would be on. The series began on March 24 with a race at the virtual version of dirt Bristol Motor Speedway.

The Saturday Night Thunder series of races for drivers in NASCAR's lower series did not return in 2021. However, before each race, at least 10 drivers from NASCAR's lower series were selected to be on a ballot for a fan vote for one starting spot in each eNASCAR iRacing Pro Invitational Series race.

== Teams and drivers ==
=== Chartered teams ===
==== Complete schedule ====
Manufacturer	Team	No.	Race driver
Chevrolet	Chip Ganassi Racing	42	Ross Chastain
Chevrolet	Hendrick Motorsports	5	Kyle Larson
Chevrolet	Hendrick Motorsports	9	Chase Elliott
Chevrolet	Hendrick Motorsports	24	William Byron
Chevrolet	Hendrick Motorsports	48	Alex Bowman
Chevrolet	Petty Ware Racing	51	Garrett Smithley
Chevrolet	Richard Childress Racing	3	Austin Dillon
Chevrolet	Richard Childress Racing	8	Tyler Reddick
Chevrolet	Richard Petty Motorsports	43	Erik Jones
Chevrolet	Rick Ware Racing	15	James Davison
Chevrolet	Spire Motorsports	7	Corey LaJoie
Chevrolet	Spire Motorsports	77	Justin Haley
Chevrolet	StarCom Racing	00	Quin Houff
Chevrolet	Trackhouse Racing Team	99	Daniel Suárez
Chevrolet	JTG Daugherty Racing	47	Ricky Stenhouse Jr.
Chevrolet	JTG Daugherty Racing	4	Ryan Preece 1
Ford	Stewart-Haas Racing	4	Kevin Harvick 4
Ford	Stewart-Haas Racing	10	Aric Almirola
Ford	Stewart-Haas Racing	14	Chase Briscoe
Ford	Stewart-Haas Racing	41	Cole Custer
Ford	Front Row Motorsports	38	Anthony Alfredo
Ford	Live Fast Motorsports	78	B. J. McLeod 4
Ford	Live Fast Motorsports	78	Kyle Tilley 1
Ford	Rick Ware Racing	52	Josh Bilicki
Ford	Roush Fenway Racing	6	Ryan Newman
Ford	Roush Fenway Racing	17	Chris Buescher
Ford	Team Penske	2	Timmy Hill 1 (Note: Hill is running the full season split between Team Penske's No. 2 and MBM Motorsports' No. 66.)
Ford	Team Penske	2	Brad Keselowski 4
Ford	Team Penske	22	Joey Logano
Ford	Wood Brothers Racing	21	Matt DiBenedetto
Toyota	23XI Racing	23	Bubba Wallace
Toyota	Joe Gibbs Racing	11	Denny Hamlin
Toyota	Joe Gibbs Racing	18	Kyle Busch 4
Toyota	Joe Gibbs Racing	18	Ty Gibbs 1
Toyota	Joe Gibbs Racing	19	Martin Truex Jr.
Toyota	Joe Gibbs Racing	20	Christopher Bell
Chevrolet 3 Ford 1	Rick Ware Racing	53	Joey Gase

==== Limited schedule ====
Manufacturer	Team	No.	Race driver	Rounds
Chevrolet	Chip Ganassi Racing	1	Kurt Busch	4
Ford	Front Row Motorsports	34	Michael McDowell	4
Ford	Team Penske	12	Ryan Blaney	4

=== Non-chartered teams ===
==== Complete schedule ====
Manufacturer	Team	No.	Race driver
Chevrolet	JR Motorsports	88	Dale Earnhardt Jr.

==== Limited schedule ====
Manufacturer	Team	No.	Race driver	Rounds
Chevrolet	B. J. McLeod Motorsports	87	Jesse Iwuji	4
Ford	Clint Bowyer Racing	79	Clint Bowyer	3
Ford	Stewart-Haas Racing	62	Keelan Harvick	1
Toyota	Joe Gibbs Racing	25	Bobby Labonte	1
Toyota 3 Ford 1	MBM Motorsports	66	Timmy Hill	4

== Schedule ==
On January 26, 2021, Fox announced the dates of their five races, and four of the five tracks that they would be on. On March 24, NASCAR, iRacing, and Fox announced that the fifth race of Fox's schedule of races for the series would take place at an imaginary street course in the Chicago Loop in Downtown Chicago.

No	Track	Date
1	Bristol Motor Speedway (Dirt Course), Bristol, Tennessee	March 24
2	Talladega Superspeedway, Lincoln, Alabama	April 21
3	Darlington Raceway, Darlington, South Carolina	May 5
4	Circuit of the Americas, Austin, Texas	May 19
5	Chicago Street Course, Chicago, Illinois	June 2

== Races ==
=== Bristol Dirt Race ===
Just like in the actual NASCAR Cup Series, all 36 chartered teams were given spots in the field, with four seats will be available to other teams. The drivers to take those four spots were chosen at the discretion of NASCAR on Fox. However, they only filled two of those four spots, which were for Dale Earnhardt Jr. driving a No. 88 car for his team, JR Motorsports, and their color commentator, the retired driver Clint Bowyer, driving a No. 79 car owned by himself, which was a Ford, the most recent manufacturer he had when he raced in the Cup Series. Also, the No. 4 Stewart-Haas Racing team of Kevin Harvick (who declined to participate in this race) was replaced by the open team of the No. 37 for JTG Daugherty Racing driven by Ryan Preece, a client of Harvick's sports management agency. After outrage online that the MBM Motorsports No. 66 driven by Timmy Hill, an open team in real-life Cup Series competition, was not invited to participate, Austin Cindric, who was to drive the No. 2 for Team Penske in place of Brad Keselowski (who also declined to participate), decided to give up his seat to Hill. The popular underdog driver won the race at Texas in Season One. Fans were able to make the hashtag "#LetTimmyRace" trending on Twitter the day before and of the race in support of Hill to be in the race.

Top ten finishers:

Pos	No	Driver	Manufacturer
1	24	William Byron	Chevrolet
2	8	Tyler Reddick	Chevrolet
3	20	Christopher Bell	Toyota
4	51	Garrett Smithley	Chevrolet
5	15	James Davison	Chevrolet
6	48	Alex Bowman	Chevrolet
7	5	Kyle Larson	Chevrolet
8	2	Timmy Hill	Ford
9	42	Ross Chastain	Chevrolet
10	53	Joey Gase	Chevrolet

=== Talladega ===
After deciding not to participate in the Bristol Dirt iRacing event, Brad Keselowski and Kevin Harvick returned for this race. Because Kurt Busch, Chase Briscoe and Christopher Bell were at Nashville Superspeedway that day for a test, it was announced when the entry list was posted that Busch and Briscoe would not be participating and that Bell would participate if he could make it home in time, but if not, he would be replaced in his No. 20 by Ty Gibbs. On the day of the race, it was announced that Briscoe would be entering the race after all since the tire test finished earlier than anticipated. However, Kurt Busch still did not enter.

Any chartered team in real-life Cup Series competition who entered the race was given a spot in the field (35 of 36 did- the only one that did not enter was Kurt Busch's No. 1 car). To fill the remaining spots in the 40 car field, Fox gave provisionals to Dale Earnhardt Jr. and Clint Bowyer again, a third one to Keelan Harvick, the 8-year-old son of Kevin Harvick, who competed in a No. 62 car (his car number in go-kart racing). After fans were frustrated that Timmy Hill's No. 66 car for MBM Motorsports was not given a starting spot in the field for the Bristol dirt race, it was given a spot for this race. The final spot in the field was determined by a fan vote of drivers in the lower series of NASCAR who are experienced iRacers. Part-time Xfinity and Truck Series driver Jesse Iwuji won the fan vote. Iwuji, who is also a United States Navy Reserve officer, competed in the race from Dahlgren Hall at the United States Naval Academy in Annapolis, Maryland. The other drivers on the ballot in the fan vote were Justin Allgaier, Josh Berry, Landon Cassill, Rajah Caruth, Noah Gragson, Austin Hill, Nick Sanchez, Ryan Truex, and Ryan Vargas.

James Davison started on the pole and led 61 of 70 laps, but he was passed by Brad Keselowski on the last lap, who went on to win the race, and then completed the sweep by winning the real race at Talladega that weekend.

This was the first race in both years of the series without Ryan Preece (since Harvick participated in this race and that Preece's team does not have a charter in 2021), as well as the first in which William Byron did not lead any laps.

Top ten finishers:

Pos	No	Driver	Manufacturer
1	2	Brad Keselowski	Ford
2	20	Christopher Bell	Toyota
3	18	Kyle Busch	Toyota
4	66	Timmy Hill	Toyota
5	48	Alex Bowman	Chevrolet
6	34	Michael McDowell	Ford
7	88	Dale Earnhardt Jr.	Chevrolet
8	15	James Davison	Chevrolet
9	41	Cole Custer	Ford
10	3	Austin Dillon	Chevrolet

=== Darlington ===
The fan vote returned for the race at Darlington, with all ten drivers (including Iwuji) from the first fan vote back on the ballot and the additions of Derek Kraus, Alex Labbé, and Ryan Preece. Iwuji would win the fan vote again, which put him in the field for the second straight race. However, since Daniel Suárez went back to using the No. 99, his usual number, Iwuji used the No. 87 (B. J. McLeod Motorsports' No. 78 backward). Bobby Labonte participated in this race instead of Clint Bowyer, and with Labonte also being a Fox commentator, he raced in the simulator in the Fox studio instead of Bowyer. 35 of 36 chartered teams entered, with the only one skipping the race being Ryan Blaney and his Penske No. 12 car, due to him being at Texas Motor Speedway for a tire test on the same day.

On the heels of the announcement of NASCAR's Next Gen car earlier in the day of this race, iRacing and NASCAR debuted the virtual version of the car in this race.

Dale Earnhardt Jr. started on the pole and led the opening laps before being passed by William Byron, who led the most laps. After Byron was involved in a late-race crash, Erik Jones passed Timmy Hill with two laps to go and held on to score the victory.

Top ten finishers:

Pos	No	Driver	Manufacturer
1	43	Erik Jones	Chevrolet
2	38	Anthony Alfredo	Ford
3	88	Dale Earnhardt Jr.	Chevrolet
4	8	Tyler Reddick	Chevrolet
5	9	Chase Elliott	Chevrolet
6	1	Kurt Busch	Chevrolet
7	15	James Davison	Chevrolet
8	2	Brad Keselowski	Ford
9	87	Jesse Iwuji	Chevrolet
10	99	Daniel Suárez	Chevrolet

=== Circuit of the Americas ===
For the fourth round of the iRacing Pro Invitational Series, Iwuji won his second straight fan vote. Bowyer returned to the Fox booth simulator run this race after being replaced by Labonte in the previous race at Darlington. On the heels of making his Cup Series debut in the real race at COTA, road course ringer Kyle Tilley replaced B. J. McLeod in the No. 78 for Live Fast Motorsports; the same was the case in the real-life race. Kaz Grala was added to the list of drivers on the ballot in the fan vote, joining the same 13 drivers that were on it previously. All 36 chartered teams were entered. Unlike each of the previous races, none skipped this race.

Davison scored his second pole of the season and led all 32 laps to win the race, while Alfredo finished second for the second race in a row.

Top ten finishers:

Pos	No	Driver	Manufacturer
1	15	James Davison	Chevrolet
2	38	Anthony Alfredo	Ford
3	24	William Byron	Chevrolet
4	8	Tyler Reddick	Chevrolet
5	17	Chris Buescher	Ford
6	66	Timmy Hill	Toyota
7	11	Denny Hamlin	Toyota
8	52	Josh Bilicki	Ford
9	42	Ross Chastain	Chevrolet
10	34	Michael McDowell	Ford

=== Chicago Street Course ===
James Davison won his second straight race in the series, and did it with a 56-second lead over the second-place car (his Rick Ware Racing teammate Josh Bilicki in the No. 52). It was Davison's 3rd pole of the season and the second consecutive race in which he led every lap. Davison also became the second driver in series history to win back-to-back races, joining William Byron as the only drivers to do so.

Timmy Hill drove a Ford in this race instead of a Toyota. Jesse Iwuji won the fan vote for the fourth time, remaining the only driver to have won the fan vote in the races that it has been offered. Ty Gibbs also filled in for Kyle Busch during this race.

Fox only gave out one promoter's provisional for this race (for Dale Earnhardt Jr.), as Clint Bowyer did not participate in this race. However, unlike at Darlington, Bowyer did still appear on the broadcast, replacing Jeff Gordon as a color commentator. Gordon was not on the broadcast for this race. William Byron drove on Bowyer's simulator in the Fox studio instead of at home in this race.

As this race ended up being the finale of the Invitational Series, it meant that James Davison would finish the championship in 1st place.

Top ten finishers:

Pos	No	Driver	Manufacturer
1	15	James Davison	Chevrolet
2	52	Josh Bilicki	Ford
3	77	Justin Haley	Chevrolet
4	51	Garrett Smithley	Chevrolet
5	19	Martin Truex Jr.	Toyota
6	66	Timmy Hill	Ford
7	21	Matt DiBenedetto	Ford
8	42	Ross Chastain	Chevrolet
9	00	Quin Houff	Chevrolet
10	22	Joey Logano	Ford

== See also ==
- 2021 NASCAR Cup Series
- 2021 NASCAR Xfinity Series
- 2021 NASCAR Camping World Truck Series
- 2021 ARCA Menards Series
- 2021 ARCA Menards Series East
- 2021 ARCA Menards Series West
- 2021 NASCAR Whelen Modified Tour
- 2021 NASCAR Pinty's Series
- 2021 NASCAR PEAK Mexico Series
- 2021 NASCAR Whelen Euro Series
- 2021 SRX Series
- 2021 Southern Modified Auto Racing Teams season
