= ENASCAR iRacing Pro Invitational Series =

Series of iRacing events

eNASCAR iRacing Pro Invitational Series
- Category: Sim racing / eSports
- Country: United States
- Inaugural season: 2020
- Folded: 2021

The eNASCAR iRacing Pro Invitational Series was a series of iRacing sim racing events originally organized for NASCAR drivers to compete in after its 2020 seasons were put on hold due to the COVID-19 pandemic. Drivers from all of NASCAR's series competed in races, including Hall of Fame drivers Dale Earnhardt Jr., Bobby Labonte, and Jeff Gordon. Originally supposed to be a one-time event (the first race of the 2020 season at Homestead-Miami), it quickly became a weekly series, and later included the Saturday Night Thunder series of races for drivers in the lower series of NASCAR. In each race, the series races on virtual versions of the racetracks.

In 2020, the tracks run were the ones that the NASCAR Cup Series would have raced at that weekend had the real races not been postponed due to COVID, except for the final race at North Wilkesboro, a former NASCAR track which last hosted a NASCAR race in 1996, to launch the track joining iRacing. On January 26, 2021, NASCAR and iRacing announced the Pro Invitational Series would return in 2021 to compensate for a reduced schedule for NASCAR's three national series, as the majority of race weekends only featured races without any practice or qualifying. Although Fox and NBC were supposed to split broadcast rights for the 2021 slate, the season was canceled following the former's share.

== Teams and drivers ==
Drivers from the NASCAR Cup Series participated in the main events. In the first two races (at Homestead-Miami and Texas), drivers from all NASCAR series were invited to participate. However, once the Texas race had a massive entry list of 63 cars, almost half of which did not even get to race in the main event, The authority announced that a separate series of races, Saturday Night Thunder, would be added for drivers in all of NASCAR's lower series (the Xfinity Series, Truck Series, ARCA Menards Series, the ARCA East and ARCA West Series, the Pinty's Series, the Mexico Series, and the Whelen Modified Tour) except for the NASCAR Whelen Euro Series, which had their own iRacing series. The international Pinty's Mexico, and Euro Series would eventually host an independent division called the eNASCAR International iRacing Series.

== Schedule ==
The 2021 season premiered on March 24 with the race at Bristol Motor Speedway on dirt. The events were mid-week (primarily Wednesday night) races featuring upcoming circuits, especially with the 2021 schedule featuring numerous new road courses, an intermediate oval, and a dirt track being added. Three of the five Fox events featured new circuits or with considerable changes—Bristol (dirt), Darlington Raceway (switched to the high horsepower, low downforce package instead of the reduced horsepower, high downforce package), and Circuit of the Americas—along with the popular Talladega round and a fictitious street course in the streets of Chicago.

== Rule changes ==
After cars were allowed two resets if they became damaged during the race at Homestead, it was decreased to only one reset allowed for the Texas race.

Not all Cup Series drivers were locked into the main event at Texas, as Joey Gase, Brennan Poole, and J. J. Yeley were placed in the qualifying race and had to attempt to race their way in.

The Saturday Night Thunder race from Bristol used gen-4 (old style) ARCA cars. This changed for the next one of those races at Richmond, where Xfinity Series cars were used.

== Media ==
It was announced that Fox, which normally carries this part of the NASCAR's racing season, would broadcast all iRacing Pro Invitational Series events, which fall in a portion of the timeslots where the actual races would have been at. Fox's booth announcers Mike Joy and Jeff Gordon broadcast from Fox's NASCAR studio in Charlotte, North Carolina, which would also serve as the broadcast headquarters for main booth commentators (who did not travel to the racetracks) when real-life competition resumed.

The Saturday Night Thunder races and the qualifying race for the race at Texas were not televised on Fox and were instead livestreamed on NASCAR's YouTube channel, and the commentators for the eNASCAR Coca-Cola iRacing Series events, play-by-play Evan Posocco, and color commentators Tim Terry and Justin Prince, served as the broadcast team for those races.

Fox continued to air the races in 2021.

=== Television viewership ===
903,000 viewers watched the first race at Homestead, while 1,339,000 watched the second race at Texas. These races became the most-watched eSports broadcasts ever.

== See also ==
- 2020 NASCAR Cup Series
- 2021 NASCAR Cup Series
- 2020 NASCAR Xfinity Series
- 2021 NASCAR Xfinity Series
- 2020 NASCAR Gander RV & Outdoors Truck Series
- 2021 NASCAR Camping World Truck Series
- 2020 ARCA Menards Series
- 2021 ARCA Menards Series
- 2020 ARCA Menards Series East
- 2021 ARCA Menards Series East
- 2020 ARCA Menards Series West
- 2021 ARCA Menards Series West
- 2020 NASCAR Whelen Modified Tour
- 2020 NASCAR Pinty's Series
- 2020 NASCAR Whelen Euro Series
- 2021 NASCAR Whelen Euro Series
- 2020 EuroNASCAR Esports Series
