= List of auto racing tracks in the United States =

This is a list of all auto racing tracks in the United States. The track length stands for the standard, full courses for each track. The major series listed are series that currently race at the track. This list may be incomplete.

defunct
not yet completed

== Dragstrips ==
Per Dragzine, there are 423 active dragstrips in the US (as of 2022). See drag racing for more information.

Track	Location	State	Opened	Surface	Length	Major Series
75-80 Dragway	Monrovia	Maryland	1960	Asphalt	1/4 mile	
Alabama International Dragway	Steele; 33°55′32″N 86°11′55″W	Alabama	1994	Asphalt	1/4 mile	
Alaska Raceway Park	Palmer; 61°31′29″N 149°01′31″W	Alaska	1964	Concrete	1/4 mile	
Arroyo Seco Raceway	Deming; 32°14′16″N 107°25′44″W	New Mexico	1998	Asphalt	1/4 mile	
Atco Dragway	Atco; 39°46′30″N 74°49′47″W	New Jersey	1960	Asphalt	1/4 mile	
Atmore Dragway	Atmore; 31°06′04″N 87°30′02″W	Alabama	1975	Concrete	1/8 mile	
Bradenton Motorsports Park	Bradenton; 27°28′25″N 82°19′35″W	Florida	1974	Concrete	1/4 mile	
Brainerd International Raceway	Brainerd; 46°25′02″N 94°17′03″W	Minnesota	1969	Asphalt	1/4 mile	NHRA Mission Foods Drag Racing Series
Bremerton Raceway	Bremerton; 47°29′20″N 122°45′17″W	Washington	1959	Asphalt	1/8 mile	
Bristol Dragway	Bristol; 36°31′00″N 82°14′59″W	Tennessee	1965	Concrete	1/4 mile	NHRA Mission Foods Drag Racing Series
Buffalo Valley Dragway	Buffalo Valley; 36°10′25″N 85°45′21″W	Tennessee	1965	Asphalt	1/4 mile	
Bunker Hill Dragstrip	Bunker Hill; 40°38′13″N 86°06′02″W	Indiana	1956	Concrete	1/4 mile	
Byron Dragway	Byron; 42°06′58″N 89°16′26″W	Illinois	1964	Concrete	1/4 mile	
Capitol Raceway	Crofton	Maryland	1963	Concrete	1/4 mile	
Cecil County Dragway	Rising Sun; 39°38′19″N 75°59′24″W	Maryland	1963	Concrete	1/4 mile	
Dominion Raceway	Thornburg; 42°06′58″N 89°16′26″W	Virginia	2016	Asphalt	1/8 mile	CARS Tour
Firebird Raceway	Eagle; 43°46′01″N 116°28′08″W	Idaho	1968	Asphalt	1/4 mile	
Gainesville Raceway	Gainesville; 29°45′28″N 82°16′30″W	Florida	1969	Concrete	1/4 mile	NHRA Mission Foods Drag Racing Series
GALOT Motorsports Park	Benson; 35°19′28″N 78°30′39″W	North Carolina	1957	Asphalt	1/8 mile	
George Ray's Dragstrip	Paragould; 36°02′50″N 90°26′04″W	Arkansas	1961	Concrete	1/8 mile	
Great Lakes Dragaway	Union Grove; 42°39′38″N 88°01′59″W	Wisconsin	1955	Asphalt	1/4 mile	
Hilo Dragstrip	Hilo; 19°40′53″N 155°01′49″W	Hawaii	1978	Asphalt	1/4 mile	
In-N-Out Burger Pomona Dragstrip (Pomona Raceway)	Pomona; 34°05′42″N 117°46′11″W	California	1951	Concrete	1/4 mile	NHRA Mission Foods Drag Racing Series
Keystone Raceway Park	New Alexandria; 40°24′21″N 79°24′08″W	Pennsylvania	1968	Asphalt	1/4 mile	
Kil-Kare Raceway	Xenia; 39°42′23″N 83°58′24″W	Ohio	1959	Concrete	1/4 mile	
Las Vegas Motor Speedway	Las Vegas; 36°16′19″N 115°00′36″W	Nevada	1995	Asphalt	1/4 mile	NHRA Mission Foods Drag Racing Series
Lebanon Valley Dragway	West Lebanon; 42°29′25″N 73°29′11″W	New York	1963	Asphalt	1/4 mile	
Lucas Oil Raceway (Indianapolis Raceway Park)	Brownsburg; 39°48′46″N 86°20′27″W	Indiana	1960	Asphalt	1/4 mile	NHRA Mission Foods Drag Racing Series
Magic City International Dragway	Minot; 48°14′03″N 101°15′24″W	North Dakota	1988	Asphalt	1/8 mile	
Maple Grove Raceway	Mohnton; 40°12′45″N 75°57′41″W	Pennsylvania	1962	Asphalt	1/4 mile	NHRA Mission Foods Drag Racing Series
Maryland International Raceway	Mechanicsville; 38°23′43″N 76°50′44″W	Maryland	1966	Asphalt	1/4 mile	
Mason Dixon Dragway	Boonsboro	Maryland	1961	Asphalt	1/4 mile	
National Trail Raceway	Hebron; 39°57′29″N 82°32′46″W	Ohio	1964	Concrete/asphalt	1/4 mile	
New England Dragway	Epping; 43°01′15″N 71°01′38″W	New Hampshire	1966	Asphalt	1/4 mile	NHRA Mission Foods Drag Racing Series
Pacific Raceways	Kent; 47°19′12″N 122°08′42″W	Washington	1960	Asphalt	1/4 mile	NHRA Mission Foods Drag Racing Series
Portland International Raceway	Portland; 45°35′49″N 122°41′45″W	Oregon	1960	Concrete	1/4 mile	
Rockingham Dragway	Rockingham; 34°58′42″N 79°36′52″W	North Carolina	1970	Asphalt	1/4 mile	
Route 66 Raceway	Joliet; 41°27′50″N 88°04′30″W	Illinois	1998	Concrete	1/4 mile	NHRA Mission Foods Drag Racing Series
Roxboro Motorsports Park	Timberlake; 36°21′15″N 78°49′00″W	North Carolina	1959	Asphalt	1/4 mile	
Shadyside Dragway	Shelby; 35°12′56.5″N 81°38′47.4″W	North Carolina	1958	Concrete	1/8 mile	
Sonoma Raceway (Sears Point Raceway)	Sonoma; 38°09′36″N 122°27′33″W	California	1968	Asphalt	1/4 mile	NHRA Mission Foods Drag Racing Series
Summit Motorsports Park (Norwalk Raceway Park)	Norwalk; 41°14′07″N 82°32′34″W	Ohio	1974	Asphalt	1/4 mile	NHRA Mission Foods Drag Racing Series
State Capitol Raceway	Port Allen; 30°31′41″N 91°23′12″W	Louisiana	1969	Asphalt	1/4 mile	
Texas Motorplex	Ennis; 32°19′43″N 96°43′02″W	Texas	1986	Concrete	1/4 mile	NHRA Mission Foods Drag Racing Series
Tulsa Raceway Park	Tulsa; 36°11′52″N 95°50′54″W	Oklahoma	1965	Concrete	1/4 mile	
US 13 Dragway	Delmar; 38°28′06″N 75°33′39″W	Delaware	1963	Asphalt	1/4 mile	
US 90 Dragway (Mobile Dragway)	Irvington; 30°30′47″N 88°13′27″W	Alabama	1998	Concrete	1/8 mile	
Virginia Motorsports Park	Petersburg; 37°09′59″N 77°31′26″W	Virginia	1994	Asphalt	1/4 mile	NHRA Mission Foods Drag Racing Series
Wild Horse Pass Motorsports Park	Chandler; 33°16′08″N 111°57′58″W	Arizona	1983	Concrete	1/4 mile	NHRA Mission Foods Drag Racing Series
Wisconsin International Raceway	Kaukauna; 44°14′43″N 88°15′37″W	Wisconsin	1964	Asphalt	1/4 mile	
Woodburn Dragstrip	Woodburn; 45°09′21″N 122°54′24″W	Oregon	1961	Asphalt	1/4 mile	
World Wide Technology Raceway (Gateway Motorsports Park)	Madison; 38°39′02″N 90°08′07″W	Illinois	1967	Asphalt	1/4 mile	NHRA Mission Foods Drag Racing Series
zMax Dragway	Concord; 35°21′03″N 80°41′00″W	North Carolina	2008	Concrete	1/4 mile	NHRA Mission Foods Drag Racing Series

== Figure-Eight Tracks ==
See figure 8 racing for more information.

Track	City	State	Opened	Surface	Major series	Length	Crossing form
Altamont Motorsports Park	Tracy	California	1966–2008	Asphalt		.425 miles (0.684 km)	Flat cross
Orange Show Speedway	San Bernardino	California		Asphalt	Super Figure-Eights Series	.25 miles (0.40 km)	Flat cross
Perris Auto Speedway	Perris	California	1996	Clay		.50 miles (0.80 km)	Flat cross
Irwindale Speedway	Irwindale	California	1999	Asphalt		.50 and .333 miles (0.80 and 0.54 km)	Flat cross
Evergreen Speedway	Monroe	Washington	1954	Asphalt	Super Figure-Eights Series		Flat cross
Holland Speedway	Holland	New York	1960	Concrete		.40 miles (0.64 km)	Separated cross
Indianapolis Speedrome	Indianapolis	Indiana	1945	Asphalt	Figure 8 World Championship Racing	.60 miles (0.97 km)	Flat cross
Little Valley Speedway	Little Valley	New York	1932–2011(figure 8 track)	Clay		.28 miles (0.45 km)	Flat cross
Manzanita Speedway	Phoenix	Arizona	1951–2010	Asphalt		.70 miles (1.13 km)	Bridge cross
Riverhead Raceway	Riverhead	New York	1951	Asphalt	Figure 8 World Championship Racing	.50 miles (0.80 km)	Flat cross
Seekonk Speedway	Seekonk	Massachusetts	1946	Asphalt		0.30 miles	
Anderson Speedway	Anderson	Indiana		Asphalt	National Crown is the nation's oldest continuously run stock car race, and this event even pre-dates the legendary Daytona 500.		High bank
Slinger Speedway	Slinger	Wisconsin	1974	Asphalt		.30 miles (0.48 km)	Flat cross

== Dirt Oval Tracks ==
See list of dirt track ovals in the US

See oval track racing and dirt track racing in the US for more information.

== Paved Oval Tracks ==
See oval track racing for more information.

=== Superspeedways ===
Paved oval tracks longer than or equal to 2 miles (3.2 km).

Name	Location	State	Opened	Surface	Length	Shape	Major series
Daytona International Speedway	Daytona Beach; 29°11′08″N 81°04′10″W	Florida	1959	Asphalt	2.5 miles (4.0 km)		NASCAR Cup Series, NASCAR Xfinity Series, NASCAR Craftsman Truck Series, ARCA Menards Series
Indianapolis Motor Speedway	Speedway; 39°47′54″N 86°13′58″W	Indiana	1909	Asphalt	2.5 miles (4.0 km)		IndyCar Series, NASCAR Cup Series, NASCAR Xfinity Series
Michigan International Speedway	Brooklyn; 42°03′59″N 84°14′29″W	Michigan	1968	Asphalt	2.0 miles (3.2 km)		NASCAR Cup Series, NASCAR Xfinity Series, ARCA Menards Series
Pocono Raceway	Long Pond; 41°03′19″N 75°30′41″W	Pennsylvania	1971	Asphalt	2.5 miles (4.0 km)		NASCAR Cup Series, NASCAR Xfinity Series, NASCAR Craftsman Truck Series
Talladega Superspeedway	Lincoln; 33°34′01″N 86°03′57″W	Alabama	1969	Asphalt	2.66 miles (4.28 km)		NASCAR Cup Series, NASCAR Xfinity Series, NASCAR Craftsman Truck Series, ARCA Menards Series

=== Intermediate Tracks (Speedways) ===
Paved oval tracks longer than 1 mile (1.6 km) but shorter than 2 miles (3.2 km).

Name	Location	State	Opened	Surface	Length	Shape	Major series
Atlanta Motor Speedway	Hampton; 33°23′00″N 84°19′04″W	Georgia	1960; Redesigns in 1997 and 2021/2022	Asphalt	1.522 miles (2.449 km); 1.540 miles (2.478 km)		NASCAR Cup Series, NASCAR Xfinity Series, NASCAR Craftsman Truck Series
Charlotte Motor Speedway (Lowes Motor Speedway)	Concord; 35°21′03″N 80°41′00″W	North Carolina	1960	Asphalt	1.5 miles (2.4 km)		NASCAR Cup Series, NASCAR Xfinity Series, NASCAR Craftsman Truck Series, ARCA Menards Series
Chicagoland Speedway	Joliet; 41°28′29″N 88°03′25″W	Illinois	2001	Asphalt	1.5 miles (2.4 km)		NASCAR Cup Series, NASCAR Xfinity Series, ARCA Menards Series
Darlington Raceway	Darlington; 34°17′44″N 79°54′21″W	South Carolina	1950	Asphalt	1.366 miles (2.198 km)		NASCAR Cup Series, NASCAR Xfinity Series, NASCAR Craftsman Truck Series
World Wide Technology Raceway (Gateway Motorsports Park)	Madison; 38°39′02″N 90°08′07″W	Illinois	1997	Asphalt	1.25 miles (2.01 km)		IndyCar Series, Indy Lights, Indy Pro 2000 Championship, NASCAR Craftsman Truck Series, NASCAR Cup Series
Homestead-Miami Speedway	Homestead; 25°27′07″N 80°24′31″W	Florida	1995	Asphalt	1.5 miles (2.4 km)		NASCAR Cup Series, NASCAR Xfinity Series, NASCAR Craftsman Truck Series
Kansas Speedway	Kansas City; 39°06′56″N 94°49′51″W	Kansas	2001	Asphalt	1.5 miles (2.4 km)		NASCAR Cup Series, NASCAR Xfinity Series, NASCAR Craftsman Truck Series, ARCA Menards Series
Kentucky Speedway	Sparta; 38°42′34″N 84°54′58″W	Kentucky	2000	Asphalt	1.5 miles (2.4 km)		Inactive since 2020
Las Vegas Motor Speedway	Las Vegas; 36°16′16″N 115°00′40″W	Nevada	1996	Asphalt	1.5 miles (2.4 km)		NASCAR Cup Series, NASCAR Xfinity Series, NASCAR Craftsman Truck Series
Nashville Superspeedway	Lebanon; 36°02′39″N 86°24′45″W	Tennessee	2001	Concrete	1.333 miles (2.145 km)		NASCAR Cup Series, NASCAR Xfinity Series, NASCAR Craftsman Truck Series
Texas Motor Speedway	Fort Worth; 33°02′12″N 97°16′59″W	Texas	1996	Asphalt	1.455 miles (2.342 km)/1.5 miles (2.4 km)		NASCAR Cup Series, NASCAR Xfinity Series, NASCAR Craftsman Truck Series

=== 1 Mile Tracks ===
This list contains all known paved oval tracks that are approximately 1 mile (1.6 km) in length. While NASCAR considers 1 mile tracks to be intermediate tracks, IndyCar considers them to be short tracks.

Name	Location	State	Opened	Surface	Length	Shape	Major series
Dover Motor Speedway	Dover; 39°11′22″N 75°31′49″W	Delaware	1969	Concrete	1.0 mile (1.6 km)		NASCAR Cup Series, NASCAR Xfinity Series, ARCA Menards Series
Milwaukee Mile	West Allis; 43°01′12″N 88°00′36″W	Wisconsin	1903	Asphalt	1.015 miles (1.633 km)/1.032 miles (1.661 km)		NTT IndyCar Series
New Hampshire Motor Speedway	Loudon; 43°21′44″N 71°27′40″W	New Hampshire	1990	Asphalt	1.025 miles (1.650 km)/1.058 miles (1.703 km)		NASCAR Cup Series, NASCAR Xfinity Series, NASCAR Whelen Modified Tour, American Canadian Tour, Pro All Stars Series
Phoenix Raceway	Avondale; 33°22′29″N 112°18′40″W	Arizona	1964	Asphalt	1.0 mile (1.6 km)/1.022 miles (1.645 km)		NASCAR Cup Series, NASCAR Xfinity Series, NASCAR Craftsman Truck Series, ARCA Menards Series
Pikes Peak International Raceway	Fountain; 38°35′29″N 104°40′34″W	Colorado	1996	Asphalt	1.0 mile (1.6 km)		Inactive
Rockingham Speedway (North Carolina Speedway)	Rockingham; 34°58′27″N 79°36′37″W	North Carolina	1965	Asphalt	1.017 miles (1.637 km)		NASCAR Xfinity Series, NASCAR Craftsman Truck Series, ARCA Menards Series East

=== Short Tracks ===
==== 3/4 and 7/8 Mile Tracks ====
Name	Location	State	Opened	Surface	Length	Shape	Major series
Iowa Speedway	Newton; 41°40′40″N 93°0′52″W	Iowa	2006	Asphalt	0.875 miles (1.408 km)/0.894 miles (1.439 km)		NASCAR Cup Series, NASCAR Xfinity Series, ARCA Menards Series, NTT IndyCar Series
Richmond Raceway	Richmond; 37°35′30″N 77°25′15″W	Virginia	1987	Asphalt	0.75 miles (1.21 km)		NASCAR Cup Series, NASCAR Xfinity Series, NASCAR Craftsman Truck Series, NASCAR Whelen Modified Tour

==== 5/8 Mile Tracks ====
Name	Location	State	Opened	Surface	Length	Shape	Major series
Evergreen Speedway	Monroe; 47°52′07″N 121°59′14″W	Washington	1954	Asphalt	0.646 miles (1.040 km) & 0.375 miles (0.604 km) & 0.20 miles (0.32 km)		ARCA Menards Series West
Fairgrounds Speedway	Nashville; 36°07′50″N 86°45′44″W	Tennessee	1958	Asphalt	0.596 miles (0.959 km)		ARCA Menards Series East, Superstar Racing Experience, CARS Tour, ARCA Midwest Tour, ARCA/CRA Super Series, JEGS/CRA All-Stars Tour
La Crosse Fairgrounds Speedway	West Salem; 43°54′15″N 91°06′15″W	Wisconsin	1957	Asphalt	0.625 miles (1.006 km) & 0.25 miles (0.40 km)	Oval	ARCA Midwest Tour, Mid-Am Racing Series
Lucas Oil Raceway (Indianapolis Raceway Park)	Brownsburg; 39°48′46″N 86°20′27″W	Indiana	1958	Asphalt	0.686 miles (1.104 km)		NASCAR Craftsman Truck Series, ARCA Menards Series, Superstar Racing Experience, Indy Pro 2000 Championship, U.S. F2000 National Championship, JEGS/CRA All-Stars Tour, USAC Silver Crown Series
North Wilkesboro Speedway	North Wilkesboro; 36°8′30″N 81°4′20″W	North Carolina	1947	Asphalt	0.625 miles (1.006 km)		NASCAR All-Star Race, NASCAR Craftsman Truck Series, NASCAR Whelen Modified Tour, CARS Tour
Oswego Speedway	Oswego; 43°27′26″N 76°28′55″W	New York	1951	Asphalt	0.625 miles (1.006 km)	Oval	NASCAR Whelen Modified Tour, Super DIRTcar Series
Thompson International Speedway	Thompson; 41°58′54″N 71°49′30″W	Connecticut	1940	Asphalt	0.625 miles (1.006 km)		NASCAR Whelen Modified Tour, ACT Late Model Tour, Pro All Stars Series

==== 1/2 Mile Tracks ====
Name	Location	State	Opened	Surface	Length	Shape	Major series
Bristol Motor Speedway	Bristol; 36°30′56″N 82°15′23″W	Tennessee	1961	Concrete	0.533 miles (0.858 km)		NASCAR Cup Series, NASCAR Xfinity Series, NASCAR Craftsman Truck Series, ARCA Menards Series, ARCA Menards Series East, CARS Tour
Five Flags Speedway	Pensacola; 30°30′13″N 87°18′29″W	Florida	1953	Asphalt	0.500 miles (0.805 km)	Oval	Snowball Derby, ARCA Menards Series East
Greenville-Pickens Speedway	Greenville; 34°50′00″N 82°30′01″W	South Carolina	1940	Asphalt	0.500 miles (0.805 km)	Oval	CARS Tour
Gresham Motorsports Park (Peach State Speedway)	Jefferson; 34°10′00″N 83°33′09″W	Georgia	1967; 2020	Asphalt	0.500 miles (0.805 km)	Oval	
Hawkeye Downs Speedway	Cedar Rapids; 41°56′03″N 91°40′51″W	Iowa	1925	Asphalt	0.500 miles (0.805 km) & 0.250 miles (0.402 km)	Oval	
Jennerstown Speedway	Jennerstown; 40°09′31″N 79°04′19″W	Pennsylvania	1929	Asphalt	0.522 miles (0.840 km)	Oval	NASCAR Whelen Modified Tour, CARS Tour, ARCA/CRA Super Series, JEGS/CRA All-Stars Tour
Kevin Harvick's Kern Raceway	Bakersfield; 35°17′34″N 119°15′23″W	California	2013	Asphalt	0.500 miles (0.805 km)	Oval	ARCA Menards Series West, SRL Southwest Tour
Lancaster Motorplex	Lancaster; 42°57′0″N 78°37′30″W	New York	1959	Asphalt	0.500 miles (0.805 km)	Oval	NASCAR Whelen Modified Tour, Race of Champions, Super Late Models, Modifieds, Street Stocks, TQ Midgets
Madison International Speedway	Oregon; 42°54′21″N 89°19′36″W	Wisconsin	1969	Asphalt	0.500 miles (0.805 km)	Oval	ARCA Midwest Tour, USAC Silver Crown Series
Marshfield Motor Speedway	Marshfield; 44°39′15″N 90°15′17″W	Wisconsin	1977	Asphalt	0.500 miles (0.805 km)	Oval	
Martinsville Speedway	Ridgeway; 36°38′02″N 79°51′04″W	Virginia	1947	Asphalt	0.526 miles (0.847 km)		NASCAR Cup Series, NASCAR Xfinity Series, NASCAR Craftsman Truck Series, NASCAR Whelen Modified Tour
Mobile International Speedway	Irvington; 30°30′49″N 88°13′11″W	Alabama	1965	Asphalt	0.500 miles (0.805 km)	Oval	
Montgomery Motor Speedway	Montgomery; 32°21′25″N 86°26′44″W	Alabama	1953	Asphalt	0.500 miles (0.805 km)	Oval	
New Smyrna Speedway	Samsula; 29°00′47″N 81°04′12″W	Florida	1967	Asphalt	0.500 miles (0.805 km)	Oval	ARCA Menards Series East, NASCAR Whelen Modified Tour
Salem Speedway	Salem; 38°36′00″N 86°08′25″W	Indiana	1947	Concrete	0.555 miles (0.893 km)		ARCA Menards Series, ARCA/CRA Super Series, JEGS/CRA All-Stars Tour
Sandusky Speedway	Perkins Township; 41°25′37″N 82°42′33″W	Ohio	1950	Asphalt	0.500 miles (0.805 km)	Oval	
South Georgia Motorsports Park (Valdosta 75 Speedway)	Adel; 31°03′50″N 83°23′52″W	Georgia	1962	Asphalt	0.500 miles (0.805 km)	Oval	
Spencer Speedway	Williamson; 43°13′37″N 77°14′13″W	New York	1955	Asphalt	0.500 miles (0.805 km)	Oval	
Qlispé Raceway Park	Airway Heights; 47°39′36″N 117°34′22″W	Washington	1974	Asphalt	0.500 miles (0.805 km)	Oval	
Stafford Motor Speedway	Stafford Springs; 41°57′19″N 72°19′13″W	Connecticut	1934	Asphalt	0.500 miles (0.805 km)	Oval	NASCAR Whelen Modified Tour, Superstar Racing Experience
Toledo Speedway	Toledo; 41°43′00″N 83°30′41″W	Ohio	1960	Asphalt	0.500 miles (0.805 km)	Oval	ARCA Menards Series, ARCA/CRA Super Series, JEGS/CRA All-Stars Tour, USAC Silver Crown Series
Tri-City Raceway	West Richland; 46°16′57.2″N 119°23′33.3″W	Washington	1968	Asphalt	0.500 miles (0.805 km)		ARCA Menards Series West
Winchester Speedway	Winchester; 40°10′31″N 85°01′37″W	Indiana	1916	Asphalt	0.500 miles (0.805 km)	Oval	ARCA Menards Series, ARCA Midwest Tour, ARCA/CRA Super Series, JEGS/CRA All-Stars Tour, USAC Silver Crown Series
Wisconsin International Raceway	Kaukauna; 44°14′43″N 88°15′37″W	Wisconsin	1964	Asphalt	0.500 miles (0.805 km); 0.250 miles (0.402 km)	Oval	ARCA Midwest Tour

==== 2/5 Mile Tracks ====
Name	Location	State	Opened	Surface	Length	Shape	Major series
Ace Speedway	Altamahaw; 36°11′33″N 79°29′58″W	North Carolina	1956	Asphalt	0.400 miles (0.644 km)	Oval	CARS Tour
Berlin Raceway	Marne; 43°02′08″N 85°50′07″W	Michigan	1951	Asphalt	0.438 miles (0.705 km)	Oval	ARCA Menards Series, ARCA/CRA Super Series, JEGS/CRA All-Stars Tour
Caraway Speedway	Sophia; 35°45′58″N 79°53′06″W	North Carolina	1966	Asphalt	0.455 miles (0.732 km)	Oval	CARS Tour
Dillon Motor Speedway	Dillon; 34°27′14″N 79°22′05″W	South Carolina	1966; 1977; 2007	Asphalt	0.400 miles (0.644 km)	Oval	CARS Tour
Birch Run Speedway (Dixie Motor Speedway)	Birch Run; 43°15′59″N 83°46′40″W	Michigan	1948	Asphalt	0.400 miles (0.644 km)	Oval	ARCA/CRA Super Series, JEGS/CRA All-Stars Tour
Florence Motor Speedway	Timmonsville; 34°08′17″N 79°55′07″W	South Carolina	1982	Asphalt	0.400 miles (0.644 km)	Oval	CARS Tour
New River All American Speedway	Jacksonville; 34.808°N 77.499°W	North Carolina	1956	Asphalt	0.400 miles (0.644 km)	Oval	CARS Tour
Langley Speedway	Hampton; 37°05′11″N 76°23′12″W	Virginia	1950	Asphalt	0.395 miles (0.636 km)	Oval	NASCAR Whelen Modified Tour, CARS Tour
Motor Mile Speedway (New River Valley Speedway)	Radford; 37°08′34″N 80°36′46″W	Virginia	1952	Asphalt	0.416 miles (0.669 km)	Oval	CARS Tour
Newport Speedway	Newport; 36°01′06″N 83°12′31″W	Tennessee	1977	Asphalt	0.400 miles (0.644 km)	Oval	
Ona Speedway (West Virginia International Speedway)	Ona; 38°26′21″N 82°12′03″W	West Virginia	1977	Asphalt	0.438 miles (0.705 km)	Oval	
South Alabama Speedway	Kinston; 31°14′32″N 86°11′12″W	Alabama	1973	Asphalt	0.400 miles (0.644 km)	Oval	
South Boston Speedway	South Boston; 36°42′32″N 78°52′07″W	Virginia	1957	Asphalt	0.400 miles (0.644 km)	Oval	CARS Tour
Southern National Motorsports Park	Lucama; 35°36′40″N 78°03′38″W	North Carolina	1993	Asphalt	0.400 miles (0.644 km)	Oval	ARCA Menards Series East, CARS Tour
Tri-County Speedway	Granite Falls; 35°48′43″N 81°31′31″W	North Carolina	1985	Asphalt	0.400 miles (0.644 km)	Oval	CARS Tour

==== 3/8 Mile Tracks ====
Track name	Location	Length	Shape/banking	Opened	Classes
4-17 Southern Speedway	Florida; Punta Gorda	0.375 miles (0.604 km)	Oval	1990	Late Models, Modifieds, Sportsman, Street Stocks, Bombers, Trucks, 4-Cylinder FWD, Legends, Bandoleros
Angola Motor Speedway	Indiana; Angola	0.375 miles (0.604 km)	Oval	2026	Limited Late Models, I-Modifieds, Factory Stocks, Mini Stocks
Auto City Speedway	Michigan; Clio	0.375 miles (0.604 km) & 0.3333 miles (0.5364 km)	Oval (asphalt)	2026	Super Late Models, Auto City Template Body Super Late Models, Modifieds, Factory Stock, Sportsman, Thunder Trucks, Lead Sleads, Hornets
Bronson Speedway	Florida; Bronson	0.375 miles (0.604 km)	Oval	2025	Strictly Stock, Pure Stock, Street Stock, Sportsman, Open-wheel Modified, Pro-Challenge Series, Legends, DAARA & Figure 8s
Chemung Speedrome	New York; Chemung	0.375 miles (0.604 km)	Oval (asphalt)	2026	NASCAR SST Modifieds, Super Stocks, 4-Cylinders, INEX Legends, INEX Bandoleros
Citrus County Speedway	Florida; Inverness	0.375 miles (0.604 km)	Oval	1956	Super Late Models, Open Wheel Modifieds, Limiteds, Figure 8 Sportsman, Hobby Stocks, Mini Stocks, Thunder Stocks, 4 Cyl. Bombers
Colorado National Speedway	Colorado; Dacono	0.375 miles (0.604 km)	Oval	1965	NASCAR K&N Pro Series West, Late models, Grand American Modifieds, Super Stock, Figure 8, "trains"
Elko Speedway	Minnesota; Elko	0.375 miles (0.604 km)	Oval	1965	ARCA Menards Series, Limited Late Model, Late Model, Desoto Truck Series, Sportsman, Street Stock, Novice Stock, Modified Mini, Mini Stock, Open Wheel Modified
Freedom Factory	Florida; Bradenton	0.375 miles (0.604 km)	Oval	1978 (2021)	Limited Late Model, Late Model, Desoto Truck Series, Sportsman, Street Stock, Novice Stock, Modified Mini, Mini Stock, Open Wheel Modified
Hickory Motor Speedway	North Carolina; Hickory	0.363 miles (0.584 km)	Oval (asphalt)	1951	CARS Tour, American Canadian Tour, Pro All Stars Series, NASCAR Whelen All-American Late Model Series, Limited Late Models, Super Trucks, Street Stock, Renegades,
Houston Motorsports Park	Texas; Houston	0.375 miles (0.604 km)	D-shaped Oval (asphalt)	1977	NASCAR Late Models, Modifieds, Legends, Bandoleros
Kalamazoo Speedway	Michigan; Kalamazoo	0.375 miles (0.604 km)	Oval (asphalt)	1950	Outlaw Late Models, NASCAR Modifieds, Sportsmans, Pure Stocks, Cyber Stocks(6 cyl. Front Wheel Drive)
Kentucky Motor Speedway (Whitesville)	Kentucky; Whitesville	0.375 miles (0.604 km)	Oval (asphalt)	1960	Sportsman Division, Super Streets, Pure Stock, Mini Modifieds, Mini Stocks, Stock cars, Scrappers and Figure 8s
Kil-Kare Speedway	Ohio; Xenia	0.375 miles (0.604 km)	Oval (asphalt)	1951	JEGS/CRA All-Stars Tour, Late Models, Modifieds, Sport Stocks, Compacts
Lake Erie Speedway	Pennsylvania; Erie County	0.375 miles (0.604 km)	Oval	2002	
Lanier National Speedway	Georgia; Braselton	0.375 miles (0.604 km)	Oval (asphalt)	1982	Pro Late Models, Super Trucks, Sportsman, Open Wheel Modifieds, Street Stocks, and INEX Legends, Bandoleros, & Thunder Roadsters
Lebanon I-44 Speedway	Missouri; Lebanon	0.375 miles (0.604 km)	Oval (asphalt)	1983	
Lee USA Speedway	New Hampshire; Lee	0.358 miles (0.576 km)	High-banked oval (asphalt)	1964	American Canadian Tour, Pro All Stars Series, Late Models, Small Block Supers, Late Model Sportsman, Hobby Stocks, Road Runners, and Ironman
Lorain County Speedway	Ohio; South Amherst	0.375 miles (0.604 km)	Oval (asphalt)	1949 (1961)	Modifieds, Sportsmen, Street Stocks, Pure Stocks
Orange County Speedway	North Carolina; Rougemont	0.375 miles (0.604 km)	D-shaped Oval (asphalt)	1966 (1983) (2006)	Late Model Stocks, Chargers, Mod 4s, Pure Stocks, Vintage Sportsman
Orlando Speedworld	Florida; Bithlo	0.375 miles (0.604 km)	Oval	1974	Sportsman, Super Stocks, Mini Stocks, Strictly Stocks, Super Late Models, Modifieds, Legends, Bandolero
Owosso Speedway	Michigan; Ovid	0.375 miles (0.604 km)	Oval (asphalt)	1939 (1946)	Pro Late Models, Modifieds, Pro Stocks, Pure Stocks, Sport Stocks
Oxford Plains Speedway	Maine; Oxford	0.375 miles (0.604 km)	Low-banked oval (asphalt)	1950	American Canadian Tour, Pro All Stars Series, Late Models, Mini Stocks, Strictly Stocks, 4-cylinders, Sport Trucks, Renegades (6-cylinders), and 4 and 8-cylinder Enduros
Shenandoah Speedway	Virginia; Shenandoah	0.375 miles (0.604 km)	Oval (asphalt)	2005	Late Model, Super Stock, Modifieds, Mini Cups, Pro Trucks, Virginia Modifieds, U-Car, Baby Grands, Legends, Figure Eights, Rolling Thunder Modified Series
Showtime Speedway	Florida; Pinellas	0.375 miles (0.604 km)	Oval	1960 (2012)	Sportsman, Mini Stocks, Street stocks, Stritkly stock, enduro, sprint, kids fast 4, pro figure 8, Winged Outlaw Figure, super late models, pro trucks, powder puff, mod minis, race cars of yesterday
South Sound Speedway	Washington; Rochester	0.375 miles (0.604 km)	Oval (asphalt)	2002	Super Stock, Street Stock, WESCO Sprint, Vintage Modified
Springport Mid-Michigan Speedway	Michigan; Springport	0.375 miles (0.604 km)	Oval (asphalt)	1989	Super Late Models, Modifieds, ABC Stock Cars, Sport Stocks, Wingless Sprints
Tucson Speedway	Arizona; Tucson	0.375 miles (0.604 km)	High-banked oval (asphalt)	1967 (2013)	Super Late Models, Late models, Mighty Compacts, Factory Stocks, X-Mod Modifieds, Hornets
Waterford Speedbowl	Connecticut; Waterford	0.375 miles (0.604 km)	Oval	1951	SK Modifieds, ACT-Type Late Models, Street Stocks, Mini Stocks, INEX Legends Cars, SK Light Modifieds, X cars, Super-X cars, INEX Bandolero Cars
The Bullring at LVMS	Nevada; Las Vegas	0.375 miles (0.604 km)	D-shaped oval (asphalt)	1996	ARCA Menards Series West

==== 1/3 Mile Tracks ====
Track name	Location	Length	Shape/banking	Classes
All American Speedway	California; Roseville	0.333 miles (0.536 km)	Oval	ARCA Menards Series West, Weekly regular point divisions: Late Models, Modifieds, Street Stocks & Bombers. Visiting/special event divisions: USAC Wingless Sprints, NCMA Modifieds
Beech Ridge Motor Speedway	Maine; Scarborough	0.333 miles (0.536 km)	Semi-banked oval (asphalt)	NASCAR Whelen Modified Tour, Pro Late Models, Sportsman, Road Runners, Wildcats, Legends, Beetle Bugs, Mad Bombers, and Mighty Trucks
Boyd Speedway	Tennessee; Chattanooga	0.333 miles (0.536 km)	Oval	
Canaan Fair Speedway	New Hampshire; Canaan	0.333 miles (0.536 km)	High-banked oval (asphalt)	Bandits, Outlaw Minis, Pure Stocks, Super Streets, Pro Stocks, Modifieds, and Dwarfs
Dells Raceway Park	Wisconsin; Wisconsin Dells	0.333 miles (0.536 km)	Oval (asphalt)	ARCA Midwest Tour, Super Late Model, Limited Late Model, Sportsman, Super Stock, Pure Stock, Bandits
Evergreen Raceway	Pennsylvania; Drums	0.333 miles (0.536 km)	Oval (asphalt)	
Flat Rock Speedway	Michigan; Flat Rock	0.333 miles (0.536 km)	Oval (asphalt)	ARCA/CRA Super Series
Golden Sands Speedway	Wisconsin; Plover-Wisconsin Rapids	0.333 miles (0.536 km)	Oval (asphalt)	Super Late Model, Super Stocks, Pure Stock, Cruisers, 4 cyl stock
Grundy County Speedway	Illinois; Morris	0.333 miles (0.536 km)	Oval (asphalt)	ARCA Midwest Tour, Super Late Models, Mid-American Sportsmen, Street Stocks
Harris Speedway	North Carolina; Harris	0.333 miles (0.536 km)	Oval	
Highland Rim Speedway	Tennessee; Ridgetop	0.333 miles (0.536 km)	High-banked oval (asphalt)	
Kingsport Speedway	Tennessee; Kingsport	0.337 miles (0.542 km) & 0.20 miles (0.32 km)	Oval (concrete & asphalt)	
M-40 Speedway	Michigan; Jones	0.313 miles (0.504 km)	Oval (asphalt)	Late Models, Pro Stocks, Pure Stocks (ran Mini-Stocks 2007 season)
Magic Valley Speedway	Idaho; Twin Falls	0.333 miles (0.536 km)	Oval	Street Stocks, Hornets, Stingers, Super Stocks, Thunder Dogs, NASCAR Whelen All-American Series
Midvale Speedway	Ohio; Midvale	0.30 miles (0.48 km)	Oval (asphalt)	Late Models, Modifieds, Pure Stocks, Compacts, Figure Eights
Mount Lawn Speedway	Indiana; New Castle	0.30 miles (0.48 km)	Oval	Late Models, Pro Thunder Cars, Thunder Cars, Hornets
Santa Maria Speedway	California; Nipomo	0.30 miles (0.48 km)	Oval (high banked clay)	Late Models, Modified
Seekonk Speedway	Massachusetts; Seekonk	0.333 miles (0.536 km)	Oval (asphalt)	NASCAR Whelen Modified Tour, American Canadian Tour, Pro All Stars Series, Pro Stock, Late Model, Sport Truck, Sportsman, Touring Series
Shady Bowl Speedway	Ohio; De Graff	0.30 miles (0.48 km)	Oval (asphalt)	American Modified Series, Late Models, Modifieds, Pro 4's, Sport Stocks, Compacts, Dwarf Cars, Detroit Iron
Southside Speedway	Virginia; Midlothian	0.333 miles (0.536 km)	Oval (asphalt)	Late Model Sportsman, Modified, Grand Stock, U-Car, Pro Six, Legends, Street Stock, MACKA Champ Karts
Speedway 95	Maine; Hermon	0.333 miles (0.536 km)	Semi-banked oval (asphalt)	Limited Late Models, Super Streets, Strictly Stocks, Trucks, and Enduros
Twin State Speedway	New Hampshire; Claremont	0.333 miles (0.536 km)	Semi-banked oval (asphalt)	Pro Late Models, Super Stocks, Strictly Stocks, Pro-Quads, Modifieds, Wild Cats and Sportsman
Unity Raceway	Maine; Unity	0.333 miles (0.536 km)	Low-banked oval (asphalt)	Late Models, Mini Stocks, Wild Cats, Super Streets, Pro-Fours, Enduros, Flying 4's, Ladies, Teens
Wall Stadium Speedway	New Jersey; Wall Township	0.333 miles (0.536 km) & 0.20 miles (0.32 km)	High-banked oval (asphalt) with Inner Oval	NASCAR Whelen Modified Tour, Modifieds, Sportsman, Street Stocks, Factory Stocks, INEX Legends, TQ Midgets, Bandoleros, Microstocks, Champ Karts, Go-Karts
Wiscasset Raceway	Maine; Wiscasset	0.333 miles (0.536 km)	High-banked oval (asphalt)	Late Models (Sportsman), Pro Stocks, Super Streets, Strictly Stocks, 6-Cylinder Thunderstocks, Mini Stocks, and Trucks
Wyoming County International Speedway	New York; Perry	0.333 miles (0.536 km)	Oval (asphalt)	Weekly: SST Modifieds, Super Stocks, 4-cylinders Special: Vintage Late Models, Micro-sprints, INEX Legends, Cup Lights, Smash and Crash

==== 1/4 Mile and Shorter Tracks ====
Track name	Location	Length	Shape/banking	Classes
Allen County War Memorial Coliseum Expo Center	Indiana; Fort Wayne	0.167 miles (0.269 km)	Indoor Oval (concrete)	USAC Midgets, Ford Focus Midgets, 600cc Modified-Midgets, Quarter Midgets, Karts
Anderson Speedway	Indiana; Anderson	0.25 miles (0.40 km)	High-banked oval & Figure 8	ARCA/CRA Super Series, JEGS/CRA All-Stars Tour, Front Wheel Drive, Front Wheel Drive Figure 8's, Late Model Figure 8's, Legends, Asphalt Midgets, Kenyon Midgets, Minicups (also known as Supercups), Bandoleros, Modifieds, Asphalt Late Models, Street Stocks, School bus Figure 8's, Super Trucks, Thunder Cars, Thunder Roadster, Asphalt Sprint cars, & Winged Asphalt Sprint Cars
Auburndale Speedway	Florida; Winter Haven	0.25 miles (0.40 km)	Oval	Sportsman, Street Stocks, Modified Mini Stocks, Mini Stocks, Scramblers, Road Warriors, Legends, Bandoleros
Avon Park Rotary Legends Challenge	Florida; Avon Park	0.25 miles (0.40 km)	Oval	INEX Legends, Bandoleros, Mini Cups Cars
Bullring at AMS	Georgia; Hampton	0.25 miles (0.40 km)	Oval (asphalt)	(1/4 Oval): INEX Legend Cars, Bandoleros, & Thunder Roadsters
Bethel Motor Speedway	New York; White Lake	0.25 miles (0.40 km)	Oval (asphalt)	IMCA Modifieds, Dirt Sportsman, Pro Stocks, Street Stocks, Four-Cylinders, INEX Legends, and INEX Bandoleros.
Bowman Gray Stadium	North Carolina; Winston-Salem	0.25 miles (0.40 km)	Stadium Oval (asphalt)	Modifieds, Sportsman, Street Stocks, Stadium Stocks
Corbin Speedway	Kentucky; Corbin	0.25 miles (0.40 km)	Oval	formerly (dirt, 1/2 miles) – NASCAR Grand National
Corpus Christi Speedway	Texas; Corpus Christi	0.25 miles (0.40 km)	High-banked oval (asphalt)	Texas Super Racing Series, Texas Pro Sedans, Dwarf Car Racing Series of Texas, Texas Thunders, Bombers, Super Streets, Sport Mods
Galesburg Speedway	Michigan; Galesburg	0.25 miles (0.40 km)	Oval (asphalt)	Outlaw Late Models, Sportsman, Street Stocks, Burgstocks, Outlaw Burgstocks School Bus Figure Eights
Havasu 95 Speedway	Arizona; Lake Havasu City	0.25 miles (0.40 km)	Oval	Legends car racing, Outlaw Karts, Bandolero Cars, Late Models, Modifieds, Factory Stocks, Pony Stocks, Southwest Tour Trucks
Hudson Speedway	New Hampshire; Hudson	0.25 miles (0.40 km)	High-banked oval (asphalt)	American Canadian Tour, Pro All Stars Series, Roadrunners, Rookie Stocks, Thunder Lights, Strictly Stocks, N. E. V-6 Modifieds, and North East Classic Lites
Huntsville Speedway	Alabama; Huntsville	0.25 miles (0.40 km)	Oval	Late Models, Super Modifieds, Super streets, Mini Stocks, Hobby Cups, Trucks, Hot Shots, American Buzz
I-25 Speedway	Colorado; Pueblo	0.25 miles (0.40 km)	High-banked oval	Late Model Twin 25's, Late Models, Grand American Modifieds, Sportsmans, Street Stocks, Mini Stocks, Hornets, Figure 8's, Legends, C.A.R.C Modifieds, Super Modifieds, Scaled Late Models, Mini Cups, Midgets, Dwarfs, Vintage Midgets, Street Drags
Indianapolis Speedrome	Indiana; Indianapolis	0.20 miles (0.32 km)	Oval & Figure 8	Modifieds, Hornet Figure 8's, Roadrunners, Hornets, Bomber 8's, Outlaw Stocks, Late Model Figure 8's
Jefferson Speedway	Wisconsin; Cambridge	0.25 miles (0.40 km) 0.20 miles (0.32 km)	Oval (asphalt)	ARCA Midwest Tour, Late Model, Midwest Truck Series, Sportsman, International, Hobby Stock, Legends, Bandit, Bandolero, Tournament Of Destruction, Six Shooter
Lucas Oil I-10 Speedway	California; Blythe	0.25 miles (0.40 km)	Oval	Legends car racing, Bandolero Cars, Pure Stock, Modified, Late Models, Super Late Models, Trucks, Bombers, Sportsman, Demolition Derbies
Meridian Speedway (Idaho)	Idaho; Meridian	0.25 miles (0.40 km)	Oval	NASCAR K&N Pro Series West, Late Models, Sprint Cars, Hornets, Street Stocks, Modifieds, Legends, Thunder Dogs, Super Stocks, Pro 4's, Mini Stocks
Monadnock Speedway	New Hampshire; Winchester	0.25 miles (0.40 km)	High-banked oval (asphalt)	NASCAR Whelen Modified Tour, American Canadian Tour, Pro All Stars Series, Outlaw Pros, Late Models, Strictly Stocks, Mini Stocks, Full Size Enduro, and 4-cylinder Enduro
Montana Raceway Park	Montana; Kalispell	0.25 miles (0.40 km)	Oval (asphalt)	Super Late Models, Limited Sportsman, Hobby Stock, Compacts, Bomber, Hornets, Legends, Bandoleros, Thunder Roadsters. Host: Canadian Super Trucks, ARCA Super Late Models, Baby Grands, & The Rolling Thunder Big Rigs
Mottville Speedway	Michigan; Mottville	0.25 miles (0.40 km)	Oval (asphalt)	
Onaway Motor Speedway	Michigan; Onaway	0.25 miles (0.40 km)	Oval (asphalt)	
New Paris Speedway	Indiana; New Paris	0.25 miles (0.40 km)	Oval	Late Model, Street Stocks, Mini Stocks, Figure 8's
North Pole Speedway	Alaska; North Pole	0.25 miles (0.40 km)	Oval	Legend Cars, Bandoleros, Karts
Norton Raceway Park	Ohio; Barberton	0.25 miles (0.40 km)	Oval (asphalt)	Late Models, Sportsman, Pure Stocks, Hobby Stocks
The Painesville Speedway	Ohio; Painesville Township	0.20 miles (0.32 km)	Oval (asphalt)	Sportsman, Figure Eight, Trophy Stock, Factory Fours, Street Stock Figure Eight
Rattlesnake Raceway (Nevada)	Nevada; Fallon	0.25 miles (0.40 km)	Oval (dirt)	IMCA Modifieds, IMCA Stock Cars, IMCA SportMods, Hobby Stocks, Street Stocks, Gen X, Bombers, Outlaw Karts.
Riverhead Raceway	New York; Riverhead	0.25 miles (0.40 km)	Oval	NASCAR Whelen Modified Tour, Late Models, Chargers, Blunderbusts, Super Pro Trucks, INEX Legends, Enduro
Riverside Speedway	New Hampshire; Groveton	0.25 miles (0.40 km)	High-banked oval (asphalt)	Late Models, Outlaw Sportsman, Super Stocks, Street Stocks, Dwarf Cars, Cyclones, and Tornado Mini Trucks
Sayre Speedway	Alabama; Sayre	0.25 miles (0.40 km)	Oval	Open-Wheen Modifieds, Limited Modifieds, Sportsman, Modified -Lites, Pure Streets, Renegades, Pony Stocks, American Buzz
Slinger Speedway	Wisconsin; Slinger	0.25 miles (0.40 km)	Oval (asphalt)	ARCA Midwest Tour, Super Late Model, Limited Late Model, Midwest Sportsman, Area Sportsmen, Slinger Bees, Figure 8, Spectator Eliminator
South Bend Motor Speedway	Indiana; South Bend	0.25 miles (0.40 km)	Oval	Outlaw Late Models, Pro Late Models, Mini Stocks, FWDs
Spartan Speedway	Michigan; Mason	0.25 miles (0.40 km)	Oval (asphalt)	Super Late Models, Wingless Sprints, Modifieds, Pure Stocks, Pony Stocks
The Speedway At Willow Springs	California; Rosamond	0.25 miles (0.40 km)	Oval	Late Models, Street Stocks, Hobby Stocks, Mini Stocks, WRA Vintage Sprint Cars, Southwest Tour Truck Series, Skid Plate
Sportdrome Speedway	Indiana; Jeffersonville	0.25 miles (0.40 km)	Oval	Extreme Figure 8's. Oval Extremes, Dromer Figure 8's, Dromer Ovals
Star Speedway	New Hampshire; Epping	0.25 miles (0.40 km)	Semi-banked oval (asphalt)	Super Late Models, Pro Stocks, Modifieds, Super Streets, Strictly Stocks, Road Runners, Mini Stocks, Enduros, and All-Star Fast 4's and 8's
State Park Speedway	Wisconsin; Wausau	0.25 miles (0.40 km)	Oval (asphalt)	ARCA Midwest Tour, Super Late Model, Limited Late Model, Pure Stock, 4 cyl Mini Mod
Stateline Speedway	Idaho; Post Falls	0.25 miles (0.40 km)	Oval	NASCAR K&N Pro Series West, Sprint Cars, Fever 4's, Street Stocks, Modifieds, Late Models
Sunny South Raceway	Alabama; Grand Bay	0.25 miles (0.40 km)	Oval	Go-Karts, INEX Bandoleros, INEX Legends, Stingers, Bombers, Pro Challenge
Thunder Road International SpeedBowl	Vermont; Barre	0.25 miles (0.40 km)	High-banked oval (asphalt)	American Canadian Tour, Pro All Stars Series, Late Models, Tiger Sportsman, Street Stocks, and Junkyard Warriors
Wake County Speedway	North Carolina; Raleigh	0.25 miles (0.40 km)	Oval (asphalt)	CARS Tour, Super Late Models, Limited Late Models, 4-cylinders, Modified 4-cylinders, UCars
Wenatchee Valley Super Oval	Washington; Wenatchee	0.25 miles (0.40 km)	Oval (asphalt)	Big 5 Late Models, Thunder Cars, Youth Hornets, Pure Stocks, Super Mini Stocks
White Mountain Motorsports Park	New Hampshire; North Woodstock	0.25 miles (0.40 km)	Semi-banked oval (asphalt)	American Canadian Tour, Pro All Stars Series, Late Models, Super Sportsman, Strictly Stocks, Strictly Stock Minis, and Kids Trucks
Whittemore Speedway	Michigan; Whittemore	0.25 miles (0.40 km)	Oval (asphalt)	Limited Late Models, Modifieds, Mini-Stocks, Factory Stocks, and Lead Sleds.

== Permanent Road Courses ==
Track	City	State	Opened (closing date if defunct)	Surface	Length	Turns	Major series
Airborne Park Speedway Mini Course	Plattsburgh	New York		Asphalt	.18 miles (0.29 km)	6	
Arizona Motorsports Park-Closed	Litchfield Park	Arizona	2003	Asphalt	2.25 miles (3.62 km)	16	SCCA
Arroyo Seco Raceway	Deming	New Mexico		Asphalt	1.4 miles (2.3 km)	12	
Aspen Motorsports Park	Woody Creek	Colorado	1963	Asphalt	1.1 miles (1.8 km)	7	SCCA
Atlanta Motorsports Park	Dawsonville	Georgia	2012	Asphalt	2 miles (3.2 km)	16	SCCA, ChampCar Endurance Series
Autobahn Country Club	Joliet	Illinois	2005	Asphalt	3.56 miles (5.73 km)	21	SCCA
Auto Club Speedway	Fontana	California	1997–2023	Asphalt	2.8 miles (4.5 km)	21	SCCA, ChampCar Endurance Series
Barber Motorsports Park	Birmingham	Alabama	2003	Asphalt	2.38 miles (3.83 km)	16	SCCA, IndyCar Series, AMA, ChampCar Endurance Series
Blackhawk Farms Raceway	South Beloit	Illinois	1967	Asphalt	1.95 miles (3.14 km)	14	SCCA
Brainerd International Raceway	Brainerd	Minnesota	1968	Asphalt	3.1 miles (5.0 km)	10	SCCA, Trans Am Series
Buttonwillow Raceway Park	Buttonwillow	California	1996	Asphalt	3.1 miles (5.0 km)	17	SCCA
Carolina Motorsports Park	Kershaw	South Carolina	1999	Asphalt	2.28 miles (3.67 km)	14	SCCA
Charlotte Motor Speedway ROVAL	Charlotte, North Carolina	North Carolina	2018	Asphalt	2.28 miles (3.67 km)	13	SCCA, NASCAR Cup Series, NASCAR Xfinity Series, ChampCar Endurance Series
Chuckwalla Valley Raceway	Desert Center	California	2007	Asphalt	2.68 miles (4.31 km)	17	
Circuit of the Americas	Austin	Texas	2012	Asphalt	3.4 miles (5.5 km)	20	SCCA, Formula One, NASCAR, IndyCar Series, MotoGP, FIA World Endurance Championship, Trans Am Series, GT World Challenge America, ChampCar Endurance Series
Club Motorsports	Tamworth	New Hampshire	2017	Asphalt	2.23 miles (3.59 km)	15	
Daytona International Speedway	Daytona Beach	Florida	1959	Asphalt	3.56 miles (5.73 km)	12	SCCA, WeatherTech SportsCar Championship, Michelin Pilot Challenge, AMA, ChampCar Endurance Series
Eagles Canyon Raceway	Slidell	Texas	2007	Asphalt/concrete	2.75 miles (4.43 km)	15	SCCA, LATAM Challenge Series
Firebird International Raceway	Chandler	Arizona	1983	Asphalt	1.6 miles (2.6 km)	14	
Flatrock Motorsports Park	Westel	Tennessee	2024	Asphalt	5.9 miles (9.5 km)	34	
Florida International Rally and Motorsport Park (The FIRM)	Starke	Florida	1999	Asphalt	1.6 miles (2.6 km)	10	SCCA, SCCA Rallycross, Nitro Rallycross
Gateway International Raceway (Roval)	Madison	Illinois	1997; 2019	Asphalt	1.6 miles (2.6 km); 2.0 miles (3.2 km)	10; 14	SCCA
Gingerman Raceway	South Haven	Michigan	1996	Asphalt	1.88 miles (3.03 km)	11	SCCA, ChampCar Endurance Series
GrandSport Speedway	Hitchcock	Texas	2007	Asphalt	1.3 miles (2.1 km)	9	SCCA
Grattan Raceway Park	Belding	Michigan		Asphalt	2.2 miles (3.5 km)	12	SCCA
Hallett Motor Racing Circuit	Jennings	Oklahoma	1976	Asphalt	1.8 miles (2.9 km)	10	SCCA
Harris Hill Raceway	San Marcos	Texas	2008	Asphalt	1.82 miles (2.93 km)	11	SCCA, ChampCar Endurance Series
Hedge Hollow Raceway	Adrian	Missouri	2020	Asphalt	3.4 miles (5.5 km)	10	NASA
High Plains Raceway	Deer Trail	Colorado	2009	Asphalt	2.55 miles (4.10 km)	15	SCCA
Inde Motorsports Ranch	Willcox	Arizona		Asphalt	2.75 miles (4.43 km)	21	SCCA
Indianapolis Motor Speedway	Speedway	Indiana	2000 (road course)	Asphalt	2.621 miles (4.218 km)	16	SCCA, IndyCar Series, MotoGP, Trans Am Series, GT World Challenge America, ChampCar Endurance Series
Jennings GP, (Formerly North Florida Motorsports Park)	Jennings	Florida	2001	Asphalt	2 miles (3.2 km)	14	
La Junta Raceway	La Junta	Colorado	1974	Asphalt/concrete	1.49 miles (2.40 km)	7	SCCA
Lime Rock Park	Lime Rock	Connecticut	1957	Asphalt/concrete	1.53 miles (2.46 km)	7	SCCA, IMSA WeatherTech SportsCar Championship, NASCAR Truck Series, Trans Am Series
Lucas Oil Raceway	Clermont	Indiana	1958	Asphalt	2.5 miles (4.0 km)	15	
Mid-Ohio Sports Car Course	Lexington	Ohio	1962	Asphalt/concrete	2.4 miles (3.9 km)	15	SCCA, IndyCar Series, WeatherTech SportsCar Championship, Michelin Pilot Challenge, AMA, Trans Am Series
Milwaukee Mile Road Course	West Allis	Wisconsin	1954–2005	Asphalt/concrete	1.8 miles (2.9 km)	10	
Monticello Motor Club	Monticello	New York		Asphalt	4.1 miles (6.6 km)	21	
Mooresville Motorplex	Moorseville	North Carolina		Asphalt	.80 miles (1.29 km)	22	
Motorsport Park Hastings	Hastings	Nebraska	2006	Asphalt	2.15 miles (3.46 km)	13	SCCA
Motorsport Ranch	Cresson	Texas	1999	Asphalt	3.1 miles (5.0 km)	16	SCCA
MSR Houston	Angleton	Texas	2005	Asphalt	2.38 miles (3.83 km)	17	SCCA
NCM Motorsports Park	Bowling Green	Kentucky	2015	Asphalt	3.2 miles (5.1 km)	23	24 Hours of Lemons, SCCA, ChampCar Endurance Series
Nelson Ledges Road Course	Garrettsville	Ohio	1961	Asphalt	2 miles (3.2 km)	7	SCCA, ChampCar Endurance Series
New Hampshire Motor Speedway	Loudon	New Hampshire	1990	Asphalt	1.6 miles (2.6 km)	12	SCCA
New Jersey Motorsports Park	Millville	New Jersey	2008	Asphalt	2.25 miles (3.62 km)	14	SCCA
NOLA Motorsports Park	Avondale	Louisiana	2011	Asphalt	2.75 miles (4.43 km)	16	SCCA, AMA
No Problem Raceway Park	Belle Rose	Louisiana	2001	Asphalt	1.8 miles (2.9 km)	13	
Oregon Raceway Park	Grass Valley	Oregon	2008	Asphalt	2.3 miles (3.7 km)	16	
Ozarks International Raceway	Gravois Mills	Missouri	2022	Asphalt	3.97 miles (6.39 km)	19	SCCA, GT World Challenge America
Pacific Raceways	Kent	Washington	1960	Asphalt	2.25 miles (3.62 km)	9	SCCA
Palmer Motorsports Park	Palmer	Massachusetts	2015	Asphalt	2.3 miles (3.7 km)	14	SCCA
Pittsburgh International Race Complex (PittRace)	Wampum	Pennsylvania	2002	Asphalt	2.8 miles (4.5 km)	19	SCCA, ChampCar Endurance Series
Pocono Raceway	Long Pond	Pennsylvania	1974	Asphalt	2.8 miles (4.5 km)	8	SCCA
Portland International Raceway	Portland	Oregon	1960	Asphalt/concrete	1.967 miles (3.166 km)	12	SCCA, IndyCar Series, NASCAR Xfinity Series, Trans Am Series
Pueblo Motorsports Park	Pueblo	Colorado	1975	Asphalt	2.2 miles (3.5 km)	10	SCCA
Putnam Park Road Course	Mount Meridian	Indiana	1992	Asphalt	1.77 miles (2.85 km)	10	SCCA
Raceway Park of the Midlands	Pacific Junction	Iowa	2002	Asphalt	2.23 miles (3.59 km)	15	
Reno-Fernley Raceway	Fernley	Nevada	2003	Asphalt	4.0 miles (6.4 km)	23	
Road America	Elkhart Lake	Wisconsin	1955	Asphalt	4.0 miles (6.4 km)	14	SCCA, IndyCar Series, WeatherTech SportsCar Championship, Michelin Pilot Challenge, AMA, NASCAR Xfinity Series, Trans Am Series, GT World Challenge America, ChampCar Endurance Series
Road Atlanta	Braselton	Georgia	1970	Asphalt	2.54 miles (4.09 km)	12	SCCA, WeatherTech SportsCar Championship, Michelin Pilot Challenge, AMA, Trans Am Series, ChampCar Endurance Series
Roebling Road Raceway	Bloomingdale	Georgia	1959	Asphalt	2.02 miles (3.25 km)	9	SCCA
Sandia Speedway	Albuquerque	New Mexico	2000	Asphalt	1.6 miles (2.6 km)	14	
Sebring International Raceway	Sebring	Florida	1950	Concrete	3.7 miles (6.0 km)	17	SCCA, WeatherTech SportsCar Championship, FIA World Endurance Championship, Michelin Pilot Challenge, GT World Challenge America, Trans Am Series, ChampCar Endurance Series
Sonoma Raceway (formerly: Sears Point, Infineon)	Sonoma	California	1968	Asphalt	2.38 miles (3.83 km)	16	SCCA, NASCAR Cup Series, AMA, Trans Am Series, GT World Challenge America, ChampCar Endurance Series
Qlispé Raceway Park	Airway Heights	Washington	1974	Asphalt	2.5 miles (4.0 km)	10	
Spring Mountain Motorsports Ranch	Pahrump	Nevada	2004	Asphalt	3.1 miles (5.0 km)	18	
Summit Point Motorsports Park	Summit Point	West Virginia	1973	Asphalt	2.0 miles (3.2 km)	10	SCCA
Talladega Gran Prix Raceway	Munford	Alabama	1985	Asphalt	1.33 miles (2.14 km)	10	
The Ridge Motorsports Park	Shelton	Washington	2012	Asphalt	2.47 miles (3.98 km)	16	SCCA
The Thermal Club	Thermal	California	2014	Asphalt	5.100 miles (8.208 km)	26	IndyCar
Thunderhill Raceway Park	Willows	California	1994	Asphalt	3.0 miles (4.8 km)	15	SCCA, 25 Hours of Thunderhill, Trans Am Series
Utah Motorsports Campus (formerly Miller Motorsports Park)	Tooele	Utah	2005	Asphalt	4.486 miles (7.220 km)	23	SCCA, World Superbike, AMA, Lucas Oil Off Road Racing Series, MotoAmerica, NASA, ChampCar Endurance Series
Virginia International Raceway	Danville	Virginia	1957	Asphalt	3.27 miles (5.26 km)	17	SCCA, WeatherTech SportsCar Championship, Michelin Pilot Challenge, AMA, Trans Am Series, GT World Challenge America, ChampCar Endurance Series
Waterford Hills Raceway	Clarkston	Michigan	1958	Asphalt	1.42 miles (2.29 km)	8	SCCA
Watkins Glen International	Watkins Glen	New York	1956	Asphalt/concrete	3.37 miles (5.42 km)	12	SCCA, NASCAR Cup Series, NASCAR Xfinity Series, WeatherTech SportsCar Championship, Michelin Pilot Challenge, Trans Am Series, GT World Challenge America, ChampCar Endurance Series
WeatherTech Raceway Laguna Seca	Monterey	California	1957	Asphalt	2.238 miles (3.602 km)	11	SCCA, IndyCar Series, WeatherTech SportsCar Championship, Michelin Pilot Challenge, AMA, Trans Am Series, ChampCar Endurance Series
Willow Springs International Motorsports Park	Lancaster	California	1953	Asphalt	2.5 miles (4.0 km)	9	SCCA, ChampCar Endurance Series

== Temporary Street Circuits ==
See street circuit racing for more information.

Track	City	State	Year(s) Run	Surface	Length	Turns	Major series
Coronado Street Course	San Diego	California	2026	Asphalt	3.40 mi (5.47 km)	16	NASCAR Cup Series, NASCAR O'Reilly Series, NASCAR Craftsman Truck Series
Detroit Street Circuit	Detroit	Michigan	1982–1991, 2023	Asphalt	1.7 miles (2.7 km)	18; 17; 9	CART, F1, Formula Atlantic, IndyCar Series, IMSA, Trans-Am
Las Vegas Strip Circuit	Las Vegas	Nevada	2023	Asphalt	3.853 miles (6.201 km)	17	F1
Long Beach Street Circuit	Long Beach	California	1975	Asphalt	2.02 miles (3.25 km) (1975–1981); 2.13 miles (3.43 km) (1982); 2.035 miles (3.275 km) (1983); 1.67 miles (2.69 km) (1984–1991); 1.57 miles (2.53 km) (1992–1998); 1.824 miles (2.935 km) (1999); 1.968 miles (3.167 km) (2000–present)	12; 15; 15; 12; 9; 12; 10	F1, IndyCar Series, IMSA, ALMS
Miami International Autodrome	Miami	Florida	2022	Asphalt	3.36 miles (5.41 km)	19	F1
St. Petersburg Street Circuit	St. Petersburg	Florida	1985, 2003	Asphalt/concrete	2.0 miles (3.2 km) (1985–1991); 1.6 miles (2.6 km) (1996–2000); 1.8 miles (2.9 km) (2003)	8; 8; 12	IndyCar Series
Chicago Street Course	Chicago	Illinois	2023-2025	Asphalt	2.140 miles (3.444 km)	12	NASCAR Cup Series, NASCAR Xfinity Series

== Paved Race Tracks By Major City ==
City	Major Oval	Major Permanent Road Course / Temporary Street Circuit	Minor Oval	Minor Road Course	Drag Strip	Defunct Tracks
New York City	Pocono		Wall Stadium, Riverhead			Meadowlands, Bridgehampton, Trenton
Chicago	Chicagoland	Chicago Street Course		Autobahn	Route 66 Raceway	Chicago Motor Speedway, Soldier Field
Los Angeles		Long Beach	Irwindale	Willow Springs		Ontario, Riverside, Fontana, Coliseum
Washington/Baltimore			Dominion	Summit Point		Baltimore, Marlboro, RFK Stadium
San Francisco		Laguna Seca, Sonoma				San Jose, Altamont
Boston	Loudon		Thompson			
Dallas	Texas			Eagles Canyon, MotorSport Ranch		Dallas
Philadelphia	Dover			New Jersey		Langhorne, Flemington, Nazareth
Houston				MSR Houston		Houston, Texas World
Miami	Homestead	Miami				Miami (CART), Miami (Grand Touring), West Palm Beach, Palm Beach
Atlanta	Atlanta	Road Atlanta				
Detroit	Michigan	Belle Isle				
Phoenix	Phoenix			Firebird		Phoenix
Seattle			Evergreen	Pacific		
Orlando	Daytona					Walt Disney World
Minneapolis			Elko	Brainerd		Minneapolis
Cleveland						Cleveland
Denver			Pikes Peak, Colorado			Denver
San Diego		Coronado				Del Mar
Portland		Portland				
Tampa		St. Petersburg				Tampa
St. Louis	Gateway					
Charlotte	Charlotte					Concord
Sacramento						Sacramento
Pittsburgh			Jennerstown			Motordrome
Salt Lake City				Utah		
San Antonio						San Antonio
Columbus		Mid-Ohio				Columbus, Columbus GP
Kansas City	Kansas					
Las Vegas	Las Vegas	Vegas Strip				Vegas GP, Caesars Palace, Stardust
Indianapolis	Indianapolis		IRP			Indiana State Fairgrounds
Cincinnati	Kentucky					
Raleigh			Wake County			Raleigh
Austin		COTA		Harris Hill		Driveway Austin
Milwaukee	Milwaukee	Road America				
Nashville	Nashville		Fairgrounds			
Greensboro	Martinsville		Bowman Gray			
New Orleans				NOLA		New Orleans
Louisville						Louisville
Greenville			Greenville			
Hartford		Lime Rock	Stafford			
Grand Rapids			Berlin			
Birmingham	Talladega	Barber				
Richmond	Richmond					
Harrisburg			Williams Grove			

== Defunct Tracks ==
=== Dragstrips ===
Track	City	State	Operated	Surface	Length	NHRA Sanctioned Racing Facility
Atlanta Dragway	Commerce	Georgia	1975-2021	Concrete	1/4 mile	
Bandimere Speedway	Morrison	Colorado	1958–2023	Concrete	1/4 mile	
Dallas International Motor Speedway	Lewisville	Texas	1969–1973		1/4 Mile	
Fremont Dragstrip	Fremont	California	1959–1988		1/4 Mile	
Green Mountain Raceway	Milton	Vermont	1962–1972	Asphalt	1/4 Mile	
Green Valley Raceway	North Richland Hills	Texas	1963–1984	Asphalt	1/4 Mile	
Heartland Motorsports Park	Topeka	Kansas	1989–2023	Asphalt	1/4 mile	
Houston Raceway Park	Baytown	Texas	1988–2023	Asphalt	1/4 mile	
Kansas City International Raceway	Kansas City	Missouri	1967–2011	Asphalt	1/4 Mile	
Memphis International Raceway	Millington	Tennessee	1987	Concrete/asphalt	1/4 mile	
Motion Raceway	Assumption	Illinois	1970–1983	Asphalt	1/4 Mile	
Newington Airport (Pease Air Force Base)	Newington	New Hampshire	1953	Pavement/asphalt	1/4 Mile	
Old Bridge Township Raceway Park	Englishtown	New Jersey	1965–2017	Asphalt	1/4 Mile	
Orange County International Raceway	California	California	1965–1983		1/4 Mile	
Palm Beach International Raceway	Jupiter	Florida	1965-2022	Concrete	1/4 Mile	
Rocky Mountain Raceways	West Valley City	Utah	1997–2018	Asphalt	1/4 Mile	
Sanford Seacoast Regional Airport	Sanford	Maine	1955–1964	Pavement/asphalt	1/4 Mile	

=== Road Courses ===
Track	City	State	Operated	Surface	Length	Turns
Augusta International Raceway	Augusta	Georgia	1960–1970	Asphalt	3 miles (4.8 km)	12
Austin Raceway Park	Round Rock	Texas	1960s	Asphalt	1.5 miles (2.4 km)	8
Bridgehampton Race Circuit	Sag Harbor	New York	1957–1999	Asphalt	2.85 miles (4.59 km)	12
Continental Divide Raceways	Castle Rock	Colorado	1959–1983	Asphalt	2.8 miles (4.51 km)	10
Driveway Austin	Austin	Texas	2005-2021	Asphalt	1.61 miles (2.59 km)	14
Gateway International Raceway	Madison	Illinois	1985–1996	Asphalt	2.6 miles (4.2 km)	14
Green Valley Raceway	North Richland Hills	Texas	1963–1984	Asphalt	1.6 miles (2.6 km)	8
Greenwood Roadway	Indianola	Iowa	1963–1966	Asphalt	3.0 miles (4.8 km)	14
Heartland Motorsports Park	Topeka	Kansas	1989–2023	Asphalt	2.5 miles (4.0 km)	14
Hilltop Raceway	Princeton	Louisiana	1960	Asphalt	2.2 miles (3.5 km)	11
Hutchinson Island Road Race Course	Savannah	Georgia	1908, 1910-1911, 1997	Asphalt	1.965 miles (3.162 km)	9
Lakeland International Raceway	Lakeland	Tennessee	1969	Asphalt	1.7 miles (2.7 km)	10
Marlboro Motor Raceway	Upper Marlboro	Maryland	1954	Asphalt	1.7 miles (2.7 km)	12
Meadowdale International Raceway	Carpentersville	Illinois	1958–1969	Asphalt	3.27 miles (5.26 km)	11
Mid-America Raceway	Wentzville	Missouri	1965-1984	Asphalt	2.89 miles (4.65 km)	10
Palm Beach International Raceway	Jupiter	Florida	1965–2022	Asphalt	2.043 miles (3.288 km)	11
Rattlesnake Raceway (Texas)	Midland	Texas	1960s	Asphalt	1.96 miles (3.15 km)	7
Riverside International Raceway	Riverside	California	1957–1989	Asphalt	3.3 miles (5.3 km)	15
Second Creek Raceway	Commerce City	Colorado	1982–2005	Asphalt	1.7 miles (2.7 km)	12
Vaca Valley Raceway	Vacaville	California	1958–1972	Asphalt	2.1 miles (3.4 km)	7
War Bonnet Raceway Park	Mannford	Oklahoma	1967–1970	Asphalt	2.3 miles (3.7 km)	11

=== Paved Ovals ===
Track name	State	City	Length	Shape/Surface	Closed
Airborne Speedway; 44.633864°N 73.498389°W	New York	Plattsburgh	0.500 miles (0.805 km)	Oval	2020
Altamont Motorsports Park; 37.738039°N 121.563249°W	California	Tracy	0.50 miles (0.80 km) & 0.25 miles (0.40 km)		2008
Augusta International Raceway; 33°21′24″N 82°5′14″W	Georgia	Augusta	0.50 miles (0.80 km)	Oval	1970
Auto Club Speedway (formerly, California Speedway)	California	Fontana	2 miles (3.2 km)		2023
Baer Field Speedway; 40.9692295°N 85.1957916°W	Indiana	Fort Wayne	0.500 miles (0.805 km) & 0.375 miles (0.604 km)	Oval	2019
Beltsville Speedway; 39.046319°N 76.851296°W	Maryland	Laurel	0.50 miles (0.80 km)	Oval	1978
Birmingham International Raceway; 33°29′52″N 86°52′17″W	Alabama	Birmingham	0.625 miles (1.006 km)		2009
Catamount Stadium	Vermont	Milton	0.36 miles (0.58 km)	Oval (asphalt)	1989
Champion Speedway	North Carolina	Fayetteville	0.333 miles (0.536 km)	Oval	1959
Chicago Motor Speedway; 41°49′50″N 87°44′55″W	Illinois	Cicero	1.029 miles (1.656 km)		2003 (Demolished 2005)
Columbia Speedway; 33°57′30″N 81°04′40″W	South Carolina	Columbia	0.50 miles (0.80 km)	Oval	1977
Columbus Motor Speedway	Ohio	Obetz	0.333 miles (0.536 km)	Oval (asphalt)	2016
Columbus 151 Speedway; 43.285715°N 89.097647°W	Wisconsin	Columbus	0.25 miles (0.40 km)	Oval (asphalt)	2015 (Demolished in 2016)
Concord Speedway; 35.309198°N 80.5210083°W	North Carolina	Midland	0.500 miles (0.805 km) & 0.25 miles (0.40 km)	Oval	2019
Dayton Speedway; 39°43′27″N 84°15′22″W	Ohio	Dayton	0.50 miles (0.80 km)	Oval	1982
Dixie Speedway	Alabama	Birmingham	0.25 miles (0.40 km)	Oval	1983
Dog Track Speedway; 36.545867°N 76.192524°W	North Carolina	Moyock	0.333 miles (0.536 km)	Oval	1974
East Carolina Motor Speedway; 35.821962°N 77.278763°W	North Carolina	Robersonville, North Carolina	0.400 miles (0.644 km)	Oval	2019
Ephrata Raceway Park	Washington	Ephrata	0.25 miles (0.40 km)	Oval	2017 (Demolished 2024)
Flemington Speedway; 40°31′35″N 74°51′10″W	New Jersey	Flemington	0.625 miles (1.006 km)		2002 (Demolished in 2005)
Golden Gate Speedway; 28.0564067°N 82.3414805°W	Florida	Tampa	0.333 miles (0.536 km)	Oval	1984
Horace Mann Speedway	Massachusetts	Franklin	0.50 miles (0.80 km)	Oval (asphalt)	1973
I-70 Speedway; 39°0′38″N 93°52′33″W	Missouri	Odessa	0.525 miles (0.845 km)		2008
Illiana Motor Speedway; 41.477121°N 87.422828°W	Indiana	Schererville	0.500 miles (0.805 km) & 0.25 miles (0.40 km)	Oval	Closed in 2016
Irwindale Speedway; 34.1091937°N 117.9882945°W	California	Irwindale	0.500 miles (0.805 km) & 0.333 miles (0.536 km)	Oval	Closed in 2024 (Demolished in 2025)
Islip Speedway; 40.7495°N 73.2115°W	New York	Islip	0.20 miles (0.32 km)	Oval	1984
Lake Geneva Raceway; 42.577354°N 88.406115°W	Wisconsin	Lake Geneva	0.333 miles (0.536 km) & 0.25 miles (0.40 km)	Oval (asphalt)	2006
Langhorne Speedway; 40.178224°N 74.884602°E	Pennsylvania	Middletown Township	1.0 mile (1.6 km)	Oval (asphalt)	1971
Little Egypt Kart Raceway Park	Vermont	Lyndon	0.20 miles (0.32 km)	Oval (asphalt)	2001
Louisville Motor Speedway; 38.129859°N 85.737008°W	Kentucky	Louisville	0.438 miles (0.705 km)	Tri-Oval	2000
Mansfield Motorsports Park (Mansfield Motor Speedway)	Ohio	Mansfield	0.440 miles (0.708 km)		2018 (demolished in 2020)
Marchbanks Speedway (Hanford Motor Speedway)	California	Hanford	1.375 miles (2.213 km)		1980
McCormick Field; 35°35′14″N 82°32′57″W	North Carolina	Asheville	0.25 miles (0.40 km)	Oval	1959
Memphis International Raceway; 35°16′58″N 89°56′51″W	Tennessee	Millington	0.75 miles (1.21 km)		2022
Mesa Marin Raceway; 35°23′40″N 118°53′13″W	California	Bakersfield	0.50 miles (0.80 km)		Demolished in 2005
Meyer Speedway; 29.6332780°N 95.4912510°W	Texas	Houston	0.50 miles (0.80 km)	Oval	1979
Middle Georgia Raceway; 32°40′8.00″N 83°42′45.93″W	Georgia	Byron	0.525 miles (0.845 km)	Oval	2005
Motordrome Speedway; 40.17611°N 79.72739°W	Pennsylvania	South Huntingdon Township	0.500 miles (0.805 km)	Oval	2015
Myrtle Beach Speedway; 33.746493°N 78.951987°W	South Carolina	Myrtle Beach	0.538 miles (0.866 km)		2020
Nazareth Speedway; 40.73°N 75.32°W	Pennsylvania	Nazareth	0.946 miles (1.522 km)		2004
New Asheville Speedway; 35.740382°N 82.557793°W	North Carolina	Asheville	0.333 miles (0.536 km)	Oval	1999
Norwood Arena Speedway	Massachusetts	Norwood	0.25 miles (0.40 km)	Oval	1972
Old Bridge Stadium	New Jersey	Old Bridge	0.50 miles (0.80 km)	Oval	1968
Old Dominion Speedway; 38.721163782°N 77.459331496°W	Virginia	Manassas	0.375 miles (0.604 km)	Oval (asphalt)	2013
Ontario Motor Speedway; 34°4′20″N 117°34′2″W	California	Ontario	2.5 miles (4.0 km)	Rectangular Oval (asphalt)	1980
Palm Beach Speedway	Florida	Palm Beach	0.50 miles (0.80 km)	Oval	1984
Portland Speedway; 45°35′37″N 122°40′11″W	Oregon	Portland	0.50 miles (0.80 km)	Oval	2002
Raceway Park (Minnesota); 44°47′38″N 93°26′07″W	Minnesota	Shakopee	0.25 miles (0.40 km)	Oval	2013
Raleigh Speedway (former Southland Speedway and nicknamed Dixie Speedway); 35°49′39″N 78°36′38″W	North Carolina	Raleigh	1.0 mile (1.6 km)	Oval	1959 (Demolished in 1967)
Revolution Park Racing and Entertainment Complex	Louisiana	Monroe	0.375 miles (0.604 km)	Semi-banked oval (concrete)	2025
Rocky Mountain Raceway	Utah	West Valley City	0.375 miles (0.604 km)	Oval (asphalt)	2018
Riverside Park Speedway; 42°2′17.7″N 72°36′42.96″W	Massachusetts	Agawam	0.25 miles (0.40 km)	Oval	1999
Saugus Speedway; 34.416360°N 118.527881°W	California	Santa Clarita	0.333 miles (0.536 km)	Oval	1995
Savannah Speedway; 32.049698°N 81.1783°W	Georgia	Savannah	0.50 miles (0.80 km)	Oval	2004
Shangri-La Speedway; 42.0933°N 76.2828°W	New York	Owego	0.50 miles (0.80 km)	Oval	2005
Starkey Speedway; 37.197954°N 80.002731°W	Virginia	Roanoke	0.25 miles (0.40 km)	Oval	1966
Texas World Speedway; 37.197954°N 80.002731°W	Texas	College Station	2.0 miles (3.2 km)		2017
Trenton Speedway; 40°14′21″N 74°43′16″W	New Jersey	Trenton	1.5 miles (2.4 km)		1980
USA International Speedway; 28.1515°N 81.8905°W	Lakeland	Florida	0.75 miles (1.21 km)		2008 (Demolished in 2012)
Walt Disney World Speedway; 28°23′48.02″N 81°34′39.61″W	Florida	Orlando	1.0 mile (1.6 km)		2015 (Demolished in 2016)

=== Temporary Circuits ===
Track	City	State	Operated	Surface	Length	Turns	Major series
Baltimore	Baltimore	Maryland	2011, 2013	Asphalt	2.04 miles (3.28 km)	15	IndyCar, ALMS
Bayfront Park	Miami	Florida	1983, 2002–2003	Asphalt/concrete	1.85 miles (2.98 km) (1983–1985); 1.54 miles (2.48 km) (2002); 1.15 miles (1.85 km) (2003)	15; 11; 10	IMSA GT, CART, ALMS
Bicentennial Park	Miami	Florida	1986, 1995	Asphalt/concrete	1.873 miles (3.014 km)	11	IMSA GT, CART
Bremerton Speedway	Bremerton	Washington	1954-1957, 1959, 1962	Concrete / asphalt	0.90 miles (1.45 km)	4	NASCAR Grand National,SCCA
Burke Lakefront Airport	Cleveland	Ohio	1982–2007	Concrete	2.369 miles (3.813 km) (1982–1989); 2.106 miles (3.389 km) (1990–2007)	11; 9	CART
Caesars Palace	Las Vegas	Nevada	1981–1984	Asphalt	2.268 miles (3.650 km) (1981–1982); 1.125 miles (1.811 km) (1983–1984)	14; 5	F1, CART
Chicago	Chicago	Illinois	2023–2025	Asphalt	2.140 miles (3.444 km)	12	NASCAR Cup Series, NASCAR Xfinity Series
Columbus	Columbus	Ohio	1985	Asphalt	2.3 miles (3.7 km)	9	IMSA GT
Dallas	Dallas	Texas	1984–1996	Asphalt	2.424 miles (3.901 km) (1984); 1.3 miles (2.1 km) (1988); 1.57 miles (2.53 km) (1989–1991); 1.5 miles (2.4 km) (1993–1996)	15; 9; 12; 10	F1, Trans-Am, IMSA GT
Daytona Beach	Daytona Beach	Florida	1903–1958	Sand/asphalt	4.2 miles (6.8 km)	4	NASCAR
Denver	Denver	Colorado	1990, 2002	Asphalt	1.97 miles (3.17 km) (1990–1991); 1.64 miles (2.64 km) (2002–2006)	16; 11	CART
Del Mar	Del Mar	California	1987	Asphalt	1.6 miles (2.6 km)	17	IMSA GT
Des Moines	Des Moines	Iowa	1989	Asphalt	1.8 miles (2.9 km)	12	Trans-Am
Belle Isle Street Course	Detroit	Michigan	1992	Asphalt	2.096 miles (3.373 km)	14	IndyCar Series, CART, IRL, ALMS
Evanston	Evanston	Illinois	1895	Asphalt	52.4 miles (84.3 km)	32	
Houston	Houston	Texas	1998	Asphalt	1.53 miles (2.46 km)	9	CART
Las Vegas	Las Vegas	Nevada	2007	Asphalt	2.44 miles (3.93 km)	12	Champ Car
Linden Airport	Linden	New Jersey	1950, 1954	Concrete / asphalt	2.00 miles (3.22 km)	6	NASCAR Grand National
Meadowlands	East Rutherford	New Jersey	1984	Asphalt	1.682 miles (2.707 km) (1984–1987); 1.217 miles (1.959 km) (1988–1991)	14; 5	CART
Minnesota	Minneapolis	Minnesota	1996	Asphalt	1.6 miles (2.6 km)	13	Trans-Am, USRRC
Montgomery Airbase	Montgomery	New York	1956-1961	Concrete / asphalt	2.00 miles (3.22 km)	7	NASCAR Grand National
New Orleans	New Orleans	Louisiana	1991	Asphalt	2.092 miles (3.367 km) (1991); 1.43 miles (2.30 km) (1992–1995)	10; 10	IMSA GT
Phoenix	Phoenix	Arizona	1989–1991	Asphalt	2.36 miles (3.80 km) (1989–90); 2.312 miles (3.721 km) (1991)	13; 12	F1
Pikes Peak	Colorado Springs	Colorado	1916	Asphalt (historically dirt)	12.42 miles (19.99 km)	156	Pikes Peak International Hill Climb
Reliant Park	Houston	Texas	2006, 2012	Concrete/asphalt	1.7 miles (2.7 km)	9	ALMS, Champ Car
Robert F. Kennedy Stadium	Washington	D.C.	2002	Asphalt	1.7 miles (2.7 km)	7	ALMS
San Antonio	San Antonio	Texas	1987	Asphalt	1.670 miles (2.688 km)	9	IMSA GT
San Jose	San Jose	California	2005	Asphalt	1.443 miles (2.322 km)	7	Champ Car
Tamiami Park	University Park	Florida	1985	Asphalt	1.784 miles (2.871 km)	10	Champ Car
Tampa	Tampa	Florida	1989	Asphalt	1.9 miles (3.1 km)	10	IMSA GT
Titusville-Cocoa Speedway	Titusville	Florida	1956-1958	Concrete / asphalt	1.6 miles (2.6 km)	12	NASCAR Grand National
West Michigan	Grand Rapids	Michigan	1998	Asphalt	1.5 miles (2.4 km)	13	Trans-Am
West Palm Beach	West Palm Beach	Florida	1986	Asphalt	1.6 miles (2.6 km)	10	IMSA GT

== See also ==
- List of motor racing venues by capacity
- List of U.S. stadiums by capacity
- List of NASCAR tracks
- List of NASCAR series
- IMSA
- List of Champ Car circuits
- List of IndyCar Series racetracks
- IndyCar Series
- NASCAR
- NHRA
- Drag Racing
- ChampCar Endurance Series
