= Sports in Austin, Texas =

Sport opportunities and culture in Austin, Texas

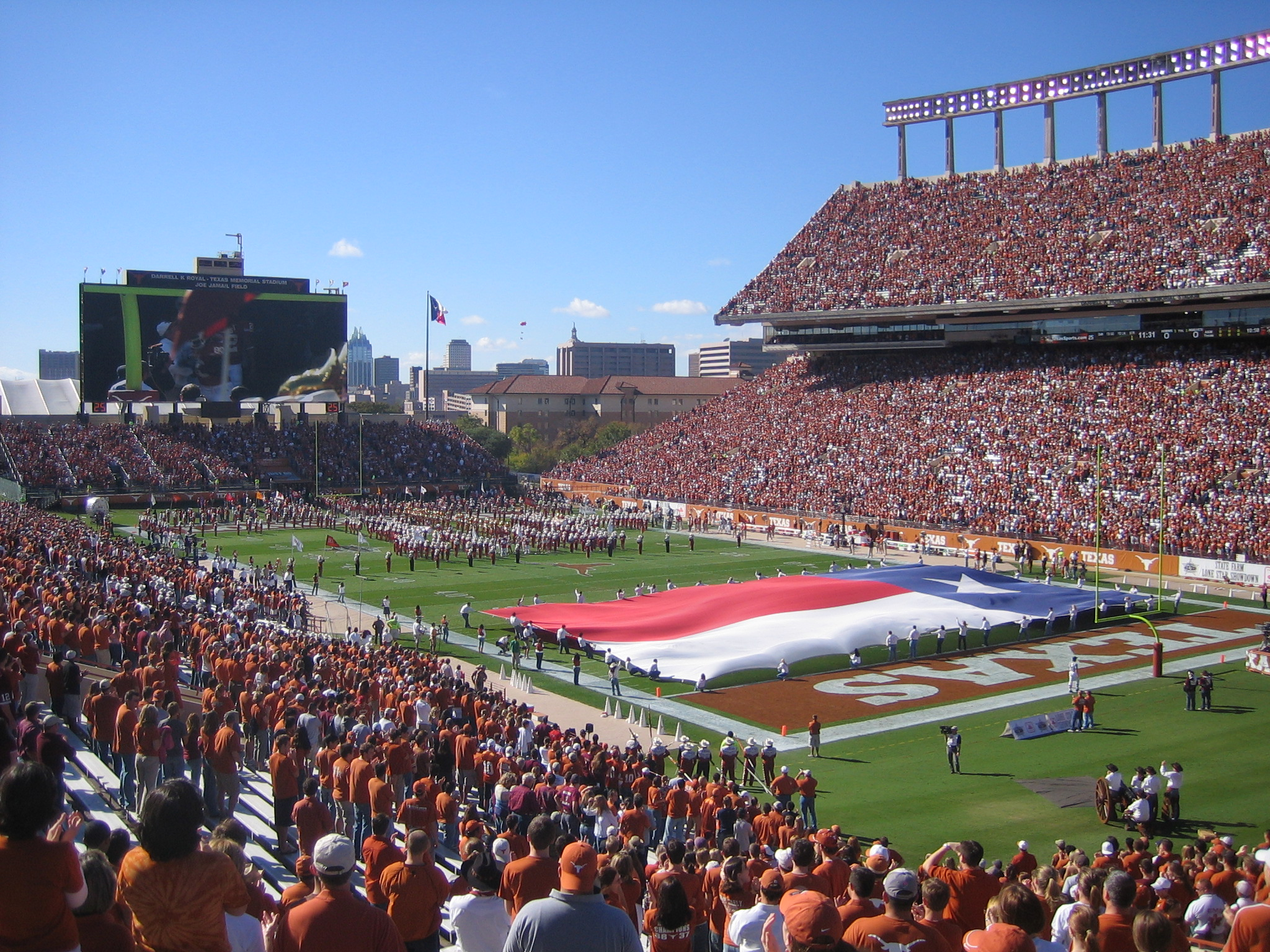
Darrell K Royal–Texas Memorial Stadium, home of Texas Longhorns football.

The city of Austin, Texas, and its metropolitan area has only one major professional sports league team. The city's professional soccer team, Austin FC, competes in Major League Soccer. Austin is also home to the University of Texas Longhorns and to several minor-league sports teams.

== Teams ==
Austin area prominent sports teams (Pro, Semi-Pro, Minor and Amateur)
Club	Sport	Founded	League	Venue (capacity)	Championships
Austin Acoustic	Arena football	2015-2019	Legends Football League	H-E-B Center (6,700)	0
Austin Aztex	Soccer	2011-2017	USL Championship	House Park (6,500)	1 (2013)
Austin Bats	Basketball	2014	American Basketball Association	Travis Early College High School	1 (2026)
Austin Bold	Soccer	2017-2021	USL Championship	Bold Stadium (5,000)	0
Austin Blacks	Rugby	1967	Texas Rugby Union	Burr Field	4 (last in 2023)
Austin Crows	Australian rules football	2002	United States Australian Football League	Onion Creek Soccer Complex	9 (Last in 2024)
Austin FC	Soccer	2018	Major League Soccer	Q2 Stadium (20,500)	0
Austin FC II	Soccer	2022	MLS Next Pro	Parmer Field (1,100)	1 (2023)
Austin Gamblers	Bull riding	2022	Professional Bull Riders	Moody Center (16,000)	1 (2024)
Austin Gilgronis	Rugby union	2017-2022	Major League Rugby	Bold Stadium (5,000)	0
Austin Huns	Rugby	1972	Texas Rugby Union	4107 Nixon Lane (2,000)	
Austin Outlaws	Football	2001	Women's Football Alliance	House Park (6,500)	1 (2001)
Austin Outlaws	Quadball	2016-2025	Major League Quadball	Round Rock Multipurpose Complex	5 (Last in 2023)
Austin Rise FC	Soccer	2022	WPSL PRO	House Park (6,500)	0
Austin Sol	Ultimate	2016	Ultimate Frisbee Association	Parmer Field (1,100)	0
Austin Sound (Now Dallas Sound)	Arena football	2020-2022	X League (women's football)	H-E-B Center (6,700)	0
Austin Spurs	Basketball	2005	NBA G League	H-E-B Center (8,700)	2 (Last in 2018)
Austin Torch	Ultimate	2019	Premier Ultimate League	Rudolph Gamblin Field (1,000)	0
Austin Turfcats	Arena football	2008-2010	Indoor Football League	Luedecke Arena (6,400)	0
Austin Weirdos	Baseball	2022-2024	Pecos League	Parque Zaragoza (1500)	0
Lonestar SC	Soccer	2004	USL W League	Parmer Field (1,100)	0
LOVB Austin	Indoor volleyball	2024	LOVB Pro	H-E-B Center (8,700)	2 (Last in 2026)
Round Rock Express	Baseball	2000	Pacific Coast League (AAA)	Dell Diamond (11,600)	1 (2000)
Texas Stars	Ice hockey	2009	American Hockey League	H-E-B Center (6,700)	1 (2014)

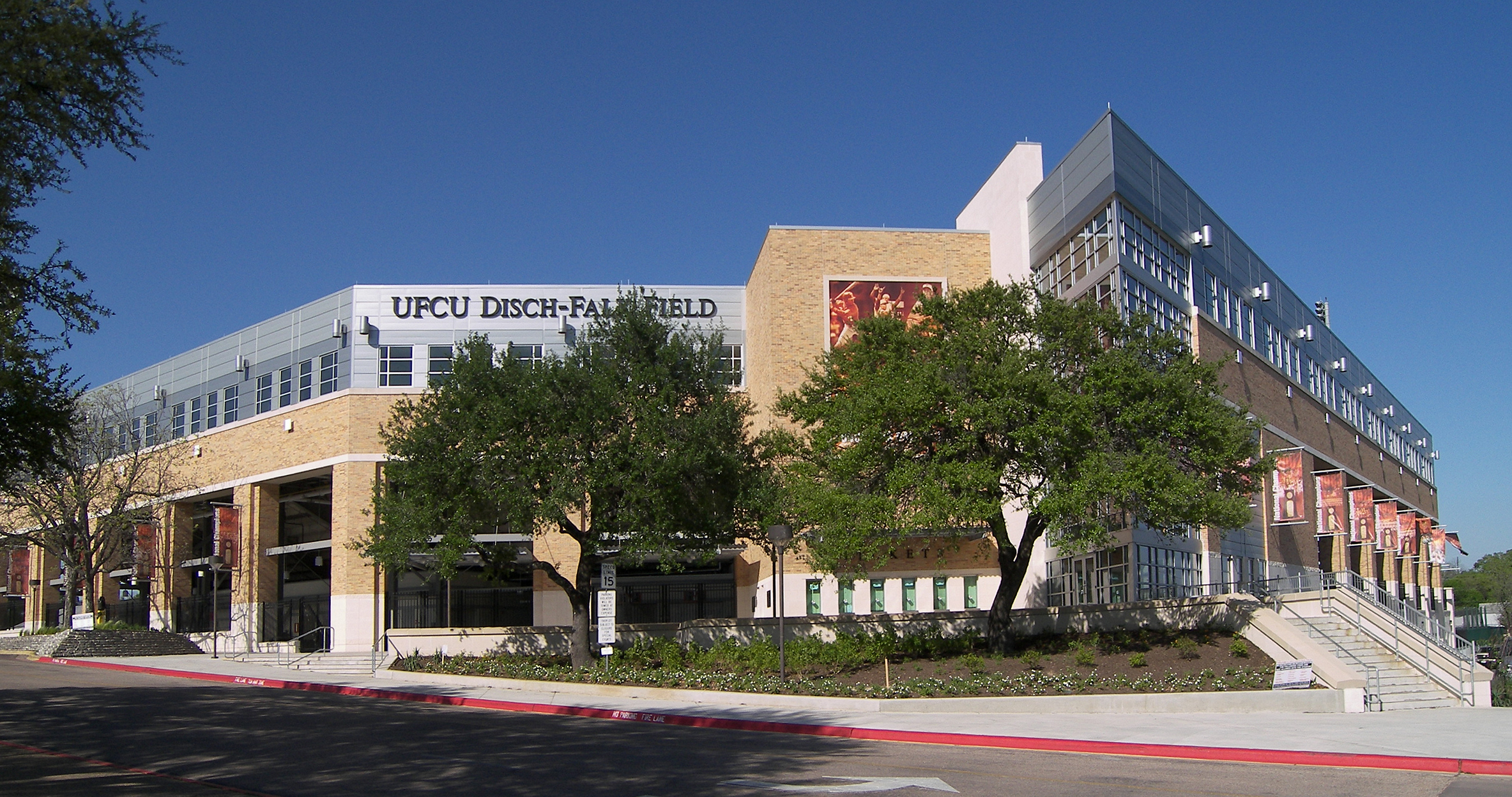
UFCU Disch–Falk Field front facade after its 2007 renovation

== University of Texas Longhorns ==
Many Austinites support the athletic programs of the University of Texas at Austin known as the Texas Longhorns. During the 2005–06 academic term, the Longhorns football team was named the NCAA Division I FBS National Football Champion and the Longhorns baseball team won the College World Series. The Texas Longhorns football team plays its home games in the state's second-largest sports stadium, Darrell K Royal–Texas Memorial Stadium, seating over 101,000 fans. Baseball games are played at UFCU Disch–Falk Field which underwent renovation in 1996 with an increased capacity to 6,756 seats plus 11 stadium suites.

Texas Longhorns Teams
Club	Sport	Founded	League	Venue (capacity)	Championships
Texas Longhorns	Baseball	1894	NCAA – Southeastern Conference	UFCU Disch–Falk Field (7,373)	6 (Last in 2005)
Texas Longhorns	Basketball	1906	NCAA – Southeastern Conference	Moody Center (16,000)	0
Texas Longhorns	Basketball	1967	NCAA – Southeastern Conference	Moody Center (16,000)	1 (1986)
Texas Longhorns	Football	1893	NCAA (FBS) – Southeastern Conference	Texas Memorial Stadium (100,120)	4 (Last in 2005)
Texas Longhorns	Soccer	1994	NCAA – Southeastern Conference	Mike A. Myers Stadium (20,000)	0
Texas Longhorns	Softball	1997	NCAA – Southeastern Conference	Red and Charline McCombs Field (1,250)	1 (2025)
Texas Longhorns	Indoor Volleyball	1974	NCAA – Southeastern Conference	Gregory Gymnasium (4,000)	5 (Last in 2023)

== Professional sports ==
Before Austin FC's arrival in 2021, Austin was the largest city in the United States without a club in a major professional sports league. Minor-league professional sports came to Austin in 1996, when the Austin Ice Bats began playing at the Travis County Expo Center. Since then, the Austin Ice Bats have been replaced by the Texas Stars of the American Hockey League. Other teams have come to Austin including the Austin Spurs of the NBA Development League (later rebranded as the NBA G League), as well as their major league affiliate San Antonio Spurs starting to play regular season games at Moody Center since 2023. The Austin Huns Rugby Football Club entered into their first year as a professional sports entity in 2016. The Round Rock Express Baseball Club the Triple-A affiliate of the Texas Rangers, play at Dell Diamond. The Express are owned and operated by Ryan Sanders Sports and Entertainment, which is led by Baseball Hall-of-Famer, Nolan Ryan.

In October 2017, Precourt Sports Ventures announced a plan to move the Columbus Crew SC soccer franchise from Columbus, Ohio to Austin. Precourt reached an arrangement with the City of Austin to construct a new courthouse $200 million stadium on public land at 10414 McKalla Place. However, in October 2018, Jimmy Haslam, owner of the Cleveland Browns of the National Football League, along with Columbus businessman Pete Edwards Jr., announced plans to acquire the Crew to keep the club in central Ohio and Precourt was instead granted an expansion club to operate in Austin. Austin FC was then announced as planning to start play in the 2021 season.

== Biking, swimming, and running ==
Natural features like the bicycle-friendly Texas Hill Country, limestone rock formations, and generally mild climate work with the centrally located Lady Bird Lake Hike and Bike Trail, and local pools like Barton Springs to make Austin the home of several endurance and multi-sport races and communities. The Capitol 10,000 is the largest 10 K race in Texas, and approximately fifth largest in the United States. The Austin Marathon has been run in the city every year since 1992. The Austin-founded American Swimming Association hosts an open water swimming event, the Cap 2 K, and other closed-course, open water, and cable swim races around town.

Austin is also the hometown of several cycling groups and the former seven-time Tour de France champion cyclist Lance Armstrong, as well as environmentally and economically minded bicycle commuters. Combining these three disciplines is a growing crop of triathlons, including the Capital of Texas Triathlon held every Memorial Day on and around Lady Bird Lake, Auditorium Shores, and Downtown Austin. Local cyclists also compete in the Driveway Series, a weekly bicycle criterium held at Driveway Austin.

== Auto racing ==
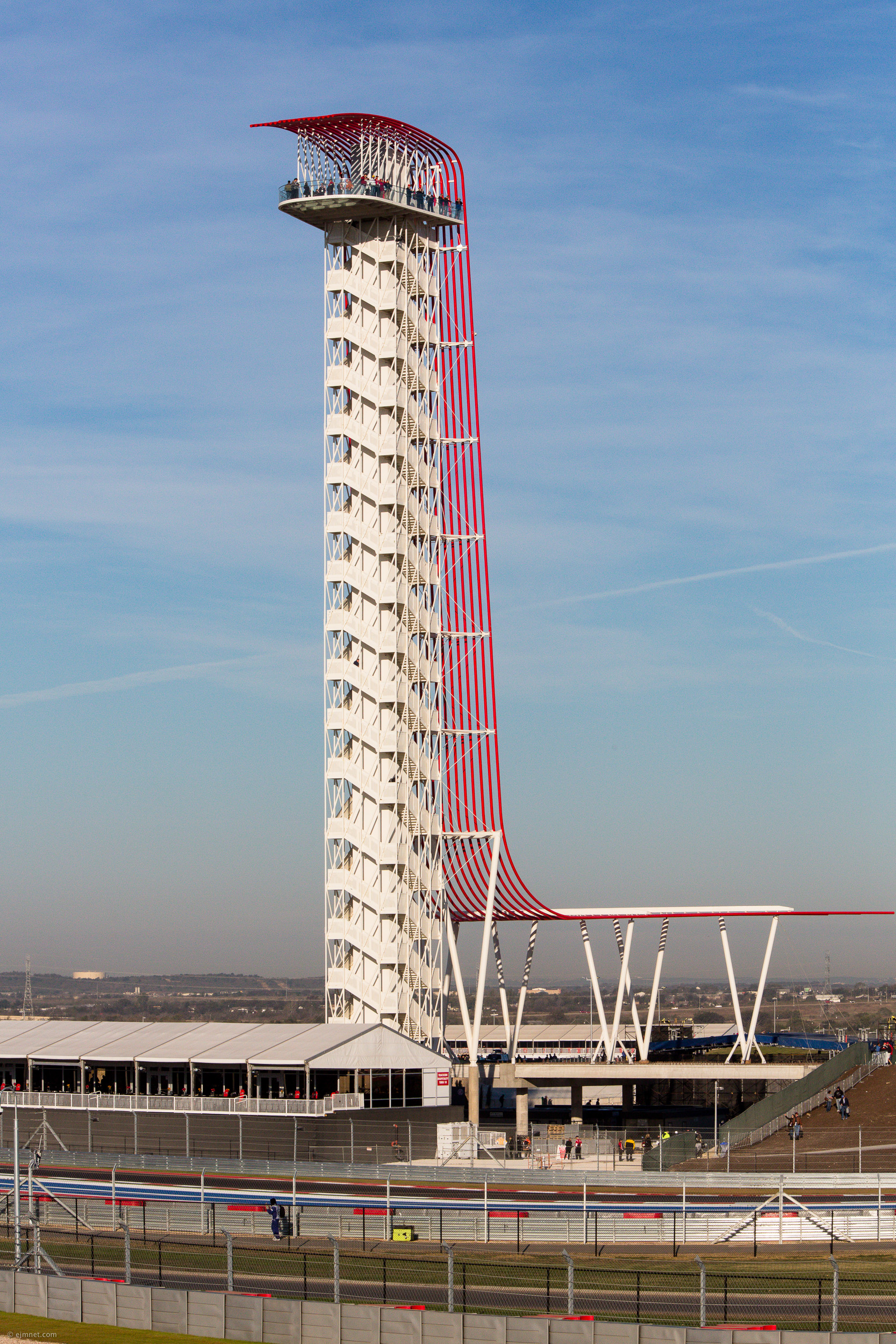
The Tower at the Circuit of the Americas.

In June 2010 it was announced by the Formula One chief executive Bernie Ecclestone that the Austin area would host the Formula One, United States Grand Prix, from 2012 until 2021. The effort was aided by State Comptroller Susan Combs. The State has pledged to put up $25 million in public funds annually for 10 years to pay the sanctioning fees for the race. The event was last held in 2007 at the Indianapolis Motor Speedway. A Formula One circuit will need to be built at an estimated cost of $250 to $300 million, paid for by private investors, and is expected to be located just east of the Austin Bergstrom International Airport. The Austin investor group is headed by Tavo Hellmund, President of Full Throttle Productions, LP. Hellmund, of Austin, is himself a former race car owner and driver. Circuit of the Americas has also played host to MotoGP World Championships from 2013. Lewis Hamilton won the inaugural 2012 United States Grand Prix at Austin on November 18.

Driveway Austin was a motorsports track and racing school within the city, although not hosting sanctioned races and closing in 2021 to be annexed into a city park. Harris Hill Raceway in San Marcos hosts several racing series.

== Other sports ==
In July 2013 ESPN announced the X Games would relocate from Los Angeles to Austin, where the city served as one of six stops on the Global X Games circuit from 2014 to 2018 at the Circuit of the Americas.

Austin is also considered the birthplace of all-women's flat track roller derby. In 2003, the Texas Rollergirls formed as the first league to play modern flat-track roller derby and, in 2005, were instrumental in the rule-setting and track design used by the Women's Flat Track Derby Association.

In March 2022, Austin was awarded a 250 level women's tennis event, the ATX Open. It started in February 2023.
