= Capitol Speedway =

Capitol Speedway may refer to:

- Capitol Speedway (Wisconsin)
- Capitol Speedway (Alaska), an auto racing track in the United States
