= H2R =

H2R may refer to:

- BMW H2R, a hydrogen-powered car
- Harris Hill Raceway, a race track in Texas
- H2R Productions, an American production company
- Kawasaki H2R, racing version of the three cylinder two-stroke H2 Mach IV motorcycle
- Kawasaki Ninja H2R, a supercharged four cylinder four-stroke motorcycle
