= Sunny South Raceway =

- Location: Grand Bay, Alabama
- Coordinates: 30.485958°N 88.316406°W
- Opened: 1989
- Former names: Big Oaks Speedway; J & J Speedway
- Website: http://www.sunnysouthraceway.org/
- Surface: Dirt (1989–2002); Asphalt (2002–present)
- Length: 0.250 mi (0.402 km)
- Banking: Turns: 18° Backstretch: 12° Frontstretch: 6°

Sunny South Raceway originally opened in 1989 as a 1/8 mile dirt go-kart track in Grand Bay, Alabama. Full-size cars started running on the track in 1993. In 1996, the track was expanded to 1/4 mile and later paved in 2002. Sunny South Raceway has previously been operated under the names Big Oaks Speedway and J & J Speedway. Today's version of the track is a high-banked 1/4 mile D-shaped paved oval. It has eighteen degree banking in the corners, twelve degrees on the backstretch, and six degrees on the frontstretch. The track has previously held races for the Southern All Star Supertruck Series. Sunny South Raceway holds races for Pro Challenge, INEX Legends and Bandoleros, Go-Karts, Stingers, Bombers, and other types of race cars. On September 21, 2012, Sunny South Raceway held the INEX Bandolero Nationals, a race that draws over fifty bandolero drivers every year. The track also hosts the "Memorial Day Classic", a two-day race event held every year at Sunny South Raceway. The Sunny South Criterium, a professional bicycle race, was held on April 6, 2013 at Sunny South Raceway. Sunny South Raceway hosted 2013 Pro Challenge National Championship Race on October 4, 2013. NASCAR drivers such as Cale Gale, Grant Enfinger, Johanna Long, and others have raced at Sunny South Raceway.
