= Byron Dragway =

Drag racing track

- Location: Byron, Illinois, United States
- Coordinates: 42°06′58″N 89°16′27″W
- Owner: Kevin Robertson
- Address: 7287 N. River Road
- Website: www.byrondragway.com

Drag Strip
- Length: 0.25 miles (0.402 km)

Byron Dragway is a 1/4-mile (402-meter) dragstrip located in Byron, Illinois, United States, about 1.5 hours from Chicago (84 miles [135 km], straight-line distance). Although the track is 1/4-mile, it has timing for both 1/4-mile and 1/8-mile classes.

The dragway was opened in the 1960s, and at first it ran cars four abreast. However, that practice was discontinued. For that reason, Byron is a comparatively wide track. It is currently best known as the site of the World Power Wheel Standing Championships.

Byron Dragway is an NHRA track as of April, 2011.

Home Track of IHRA 2006 Summit Super Series No Box Champion John Coyle
