= Arroyo Seco Raceway =

Race track in New Mexico, United States

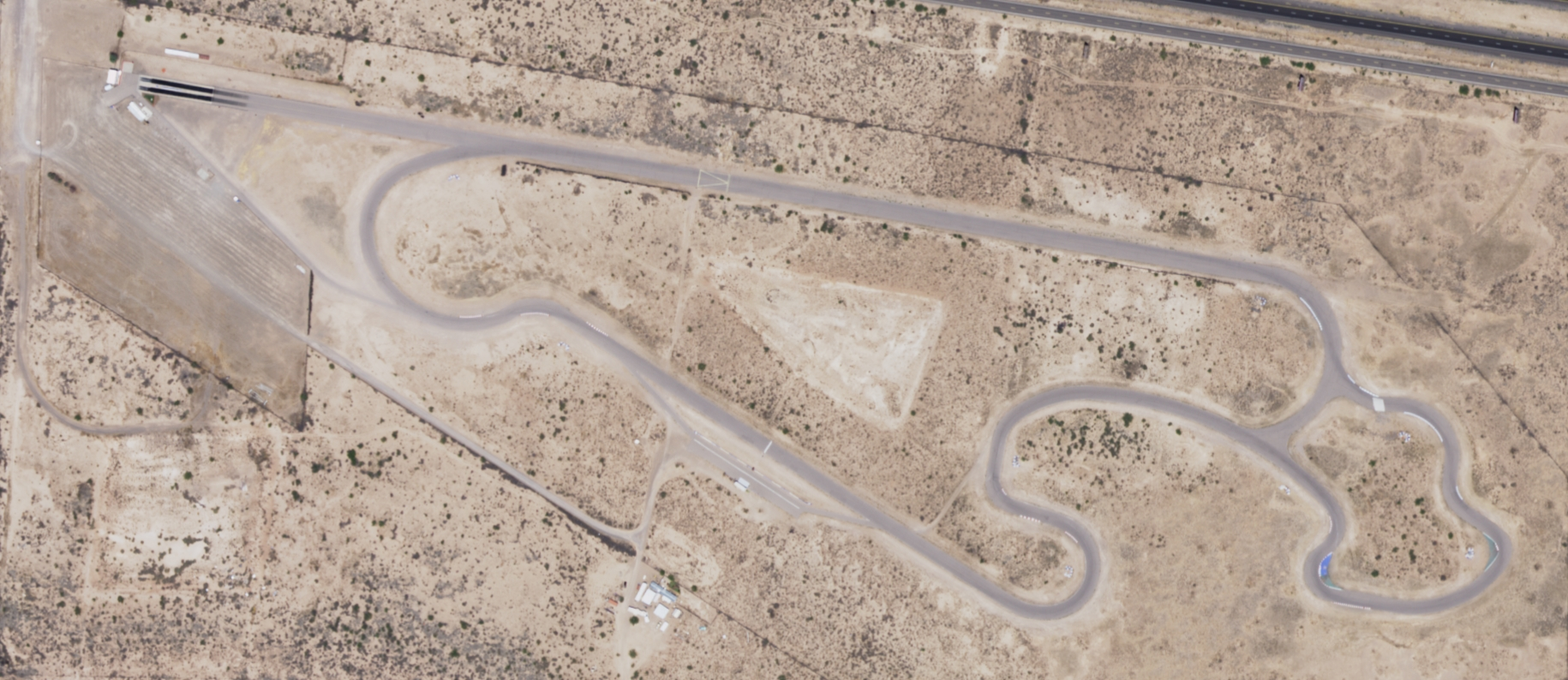
- 2022 aerial photo
- Location: Luna County, near Deming, New Mexico
- Coordinates: 32.238°N 107.429°W

Road (Full)
- Surface: Asphalt
- Length: 1.4 miles (2.25 km)
- Turns: 11
- Banking: 0°

Road (Part)
- Surface: Asphalt
- Length: 1.1 miles (1.77 km)
- Turns: 5
- Banking: 0°

Arroyo Seco Raceway is a paved roadcourse style race track, located near Deming, New Mexico. It also includes a drag strip and full race course. Akela Flats is roughly between Deming and Las Cruces. The racetrack is visible to traffic traveling on I-10, just to the south of the freeway.

The roadcourse is able to be used in multiple configurations. It can be run in either clockwise or counter clockwise directions, with 2 configurations each. The longer course is 1.4 miles (2.3 km) and includes a tight set of esses and a chicane. The shorter course deletes the esses and chicane and is 1.1 miles (1.8 km). The result is effectively 4 different track configurations for racing.

The supermoto course is variable in configuration, but usually uses the full roadcourse and includes a motocross style track in the infield of the roadcourse. Some other configurations may be available.

The drag strip is available for competition.
