= Birch Run Speedway =

Oval short track

Coordinates: 43°15′59″N 83°46′40″W

- Location: Birch Run Township, Saginaw County, at 10945 Dixie Highway Birch Run, Michigan
- Opened: 1948
- Major events: The Big One, I-75 Modified Challenge, Shootout at the Dixie, The Dixie Classic
- Website: DixieMotorSpeedway.com

progressively banked oval
- Surface: asphalt
- Length: 0.64 km (4/10 mi)
- Turns: 4

Birch Run Speedway and Event Center, until 2017 known as Dixie Motor Speedway, is a 4/10 (.400) mile, progressively banked, D-shaped oval short track, with an adjoining 1/3 (.333) mile as well as a Figure 8 course located near Birch Run, Michigan. The speedway changed its name from Dixie Speedway to Birch Run Speedway in 2017.

== Track history ==
Birch Run Speedway opened in 1948 as a 1/3 mile dirt oval. The track spent its opening decade plus as a dirt track before being paved in the early-1960s.

The track experienced consistent growth over the decades, under the ownership of the Doering and Scrivo families, with a Figure 8 course being built through the in-field pit area, moving that area to outside of the 1/3 mile oval.

The Kern family took ownership in 1996 and the Speedway then saw its greatest period of growth. A luxury VIP box was built at the top of the main grandstands, new bathrooms were installed, brand new stadium quality lights were installed to replace to outdated system previously there, a new tech barn was built in the pits and the most noticeable addition was the building of a progressively banked 4/10s mile oval.

At the conclusion of the 2008 season, the Kern family announced their intentions to retire as track operators, handing over the reins of the facility to Checkered Flag Promotions.

In 2017 the track was purchased by local car dealer Andy Suski and renamed the Birch Run Speedway & Event Center. Though the facility name has been changed the big ovals in the middle are still called the Dixie.

== Notable alumni ==
Benny Parsons – 1973 NASCAR Winston Cup Series Champion
Cy Fairchild – Michigan Motorsports Hall of Fame driver
Parnelli Jones – 1963 Indianapolis 500 Champion
Junior Hanley – Canadian Motorsports Hall of Fame driver
Ed Howe – Founder of Howe Racing Enterprises
Mike Eddy – Seven-time American Speed Association Champion
Brad Keselowski – 2012 NASCAR Sprint Cup Series Champion
Joy Fair – Hall of Fame driver and Midwest legend

Erik Jones - 2015 NASCAR Truck Series Champion and 2016 Xfinity Rookie of the Year. Also 2017 NASCAR Monster Energy Cup series Rookieof the Year.

== Current operations ==
The Birch Run Speedway currently races Friday night from late-April through September, with Eve of Destruction events usually coinciding with the summer holidays.

The regular Friday night divisions include Modifieds on the 4/10s mile oval. The American Truck Series and Pure Stocks on the 1/3 mile.

Special events include the Big One with the Outlaw Super Late Models, the I-75 Modified Challenge for the Mods, The Shootout at the Dixie for the ARCA/CRA Super Series, the CRA All-Star Tour, and the CRA Jr. Late Model Divisions, and the Dixie Classic for the Outlaw Super Late Models.
