= ChampCar Endurance Series =

Budget-class motor race

- Category: Endurance racing
- Country: United States
- Inaugural season: 2009 (as ChumpCar World Series); 2017 (as ChampCar Endurance Series)
- Official website: https://ChampCar.org

ChumpCar logo

The ChampCar Endurance Series is a budget class Endurance Racing Series held on paved road race courses across North America, formerly known as the ChumpCar World Series, run by ChumpCar International Inc. Founded in 2009, the group changed its name in 2017, with registered trademark granted by the USPTO on August 28, 2018. ChumpCar was a parody of the now defunct Champ Car World Series, an open wheel professional racing series that has since merged into the IndyCar Series. The initial concept was an endurance racing series for cars of $500 in value or less similar to the 24 Hours of Lemons endurance racing series. The series has a different overall philosophy, however, placing more emphasis on racing and less on decorations, costumes, and themes.

ChumpCar's slogan is "Real Racing, Real Tracks, Real Cheap Cars", and its stated mission, as stated on its website, is "It's all about racing. It's all about tearing down those high-dollar roadblocks that, in the past, have restricted people with a passion for cars and racing from getting fully engaged and involved in motorsports. It's about enjoyment, friends and bringing road racing back to where it was fifty years ago - when racing was fun, cheap and nobody cared whether you had Snap-On tools or a mix-match of hand-me-downs in your toolbox."

In 2015, ChumpCar Canada was split off as a separate entity, although there is still close coordination between the US ChampCar Endurance Series and the Canadian ChumpCar organization. ChumpCar World Series began referring to itself as ChampCar Endurance Series in November 2017.

== History ==
ChumpCar World Series founder John Condren was the owner of Altamont Raceway Park in California when the first 24 Hours of LeMons events were held at the track. Condren entered a team in the early LeMons races, but was dissatisfied with the party atmosphere and tongue-in-cheek mockery that continues to characterize the LeMons series. After finding that other racers were interested in cheap endurance racing and shared his dissatisfaction with LeMons, Condren formed the ChumpCar World Series and organized the first ChumpCar race in October 2009 at Portland International Raceway. In the first full year of the series, ChumpCar hosted nine events across the United States at tracks that included Texas Motor Speedway, Iowa Speedway, Portland International Raceway, Hallett Motor Racing Circuit, and Putnam Park.

ChumpCar races resembled LeMons races in the beginning, as many LeMons teams participated in lavishly decorated cars and costumes. Likewise, many of the rules in ChumpCar mirrored those in LeMons to allow teams to easily switch between the two race series. Over time, ChumpCar's rules evolved to form a more coherent, distinct series unlike any other in North America. ChumpCar's popularity grew, and as of 2013 the series scheduled over 40 events across North America at some of the best-known road racing venues on the continent, including Mazda Raceway Laguna Seca, Sonoma Raceway (Sears Point), Road America, Virginia International Raceway, Watkins Glen, Road Atlanta and Daytona International Speedway.

Notable ChumpCar competitors include NASCAR Sprint Cup champion driver Tony Stewart, well known NASCAR teams Hendrick Motorsports and Roush Fenway Racing, and Ars Technica contributing writer Jonathan Gitlin.

In July 2014, ChumpCar reformed as a membership driven club, and 501(c)7 tax exempt organization. Robert Mink became the CEO and board chair that same year.

In June 2017, the CCWS BOD resigned and Michael Chisek was made President of ChumpCar International, Inc. He was later named CEO in 2024.

In 2017, the ChumpCar World Series (ChumpCar International Inc.) adopted the name ChampCar Endurance Series. According to the organization, the open-wheel series that had previously used the "Champ Car" name abandoned it in 2008 and allowed the trademark to lapse in 2013, after which ChumpCar trademarked the name for its own use. A registered trademark was granted in August 2018.

== Preparation and rules ==
To enter an event, competitors select a vehicle from the Vehicle Performance Index (VPI) list published by ChampCar, which assigns each eligible make, model, and model year a point value based on the stock vehicle's performance potential. The system is designed so that any car in the field can be competitive for the overall win. If a vehicle's base value is below 500, a team may add performance parts as long as the car's total point value does not exceed 500; required safety equipment and the replacement of worn parts with original-equipment (OE) or OE-equivalent components do not count toward the total. Cars whose total value exceeds 500 points may still compete, but receive one penalty lap for every 10 points over the limit. ChampCar estimates that a typical car costs from about $3,000 for an entry-level build to $10,000 or more for a front-running car, with much of the budget devoted to safety- and reliability-related items such as the roll cage, brakes, tires, racing seat, fire-suppression system, and fuel cell.

The races are run for a fixed length of time, and the team that completes the most laps, after penalty laps are tabulated, is declared the winner.

ChampCar requires a full roll cage whose design and construction meet typical Sports Car Club of America and National Auto Sport Association standards, along with other mandatory safety equipment.

To be assigned a Vehicle Performance Index value, a car must generally be at least 15 years old; vehicles less than 15 years old are not assigned a VPI value, while older vehicles may be added to the index at the discretion of ChampCar's board of directors.

== Race format ==
Events are held at major road racing tracks across the US. Tracks like Daytona International Speedway, Sebring International Raceway, and Laguna Seca In the past, events were also held at major road racing tracks in Canada, along with a street race in Mexico. The most common event format is a two-race weekend, with one eight-hour race each on Saturday and Sunday. However, a variety of other formats are used, with lengths ranging from 10 to 24-hours. Starts are picked by a random number generator utilizing the pit stall number. The order is reversed for the following days' race. Teams are scored and ranked by the number of laps completed during the time allotted for the race net of penalty laps.

Teams are required to include at least two drivers (more for longer events). Each driver is required to complete at least one hour in the car. No stint is allowed to exceed two hours, with a minimum one hour rest. Pit stops where fuel is added to the car are required to be at least five minutes in length to ensure safe refueling.

== Awards ==
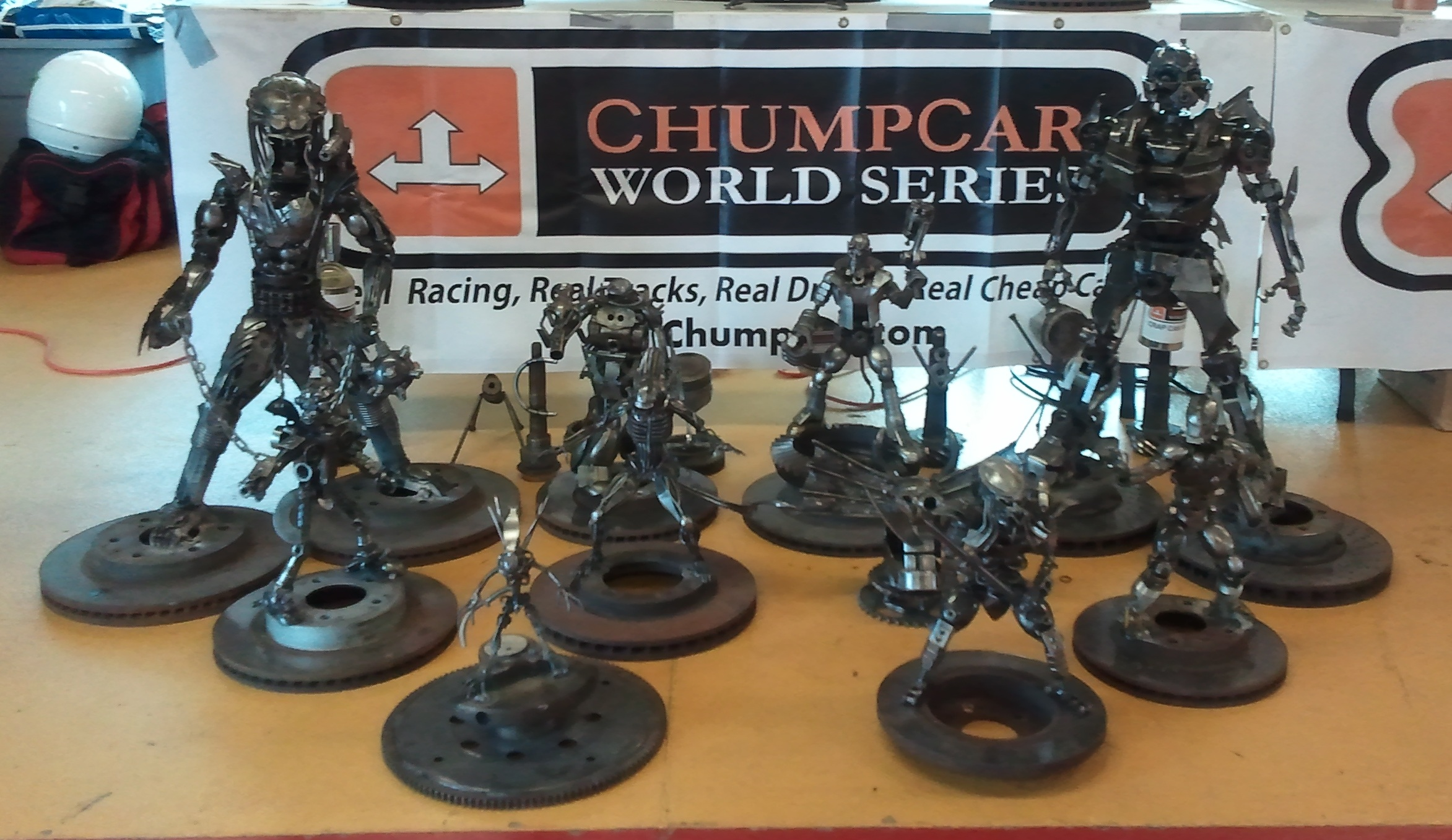
Trophies awarded to podium finishers at the 2011 National Chumpionship.

The top three finishers on laps in each race are recognized with a trophy and a credit toward future participation in the series. Top finishing teams are awarded "Race Credits" for discounts to future races. Additional awards may be given for notably good (or bad) driving, especially dedicated repair work, or good overall spirit. Overall spirit is specially recognized by the Spirit of ChampCar Award, given to the team in the race that the organizers feel best exemplifies the competitive spirit of the series.

In the past, drivers were awarded a scrip known as "ChumpChange". However, as of 2016, scrip are no longer handed out, due to counterfeiting.

Awards are made from repurposed automotive parts.

== National Championship ==
ChampCar holds a National Championship race. Its rules and regulations are as follows.

1.5.1. An annual National Championship event will be held at a track designated by the CEO.

1.5.1.1. To qualify for the National Championship, a ChampCar team must:

A. Finish in the top 75 in points for the previous season.

B. Teams must compete in at least three (3) event weekends.

1.5.2. The winner of the National Championship:

A. All qualified teams carry their top three (3) season finish points into the Championship, which will be used for seeding purposes.

B. The championship is a winner-take-all event. Win the race to win the Championship.

1.5.3. Bring the same car you raced to qualify for the Championship.

1.5.3.1. If a Championship-qualified car is totaled during the season, a replacement car can take its place in the Championship, provided the new car is the same generation, make, model, and options as the original qualified car. The new car must be inspected by ChampCar tech and approved as a qualified replacement.

1.5.4. A minimum of TWO (2) original team drivers from one or both qualifying races must complete at least one championship race lap.

1.5.5. Championship events are NOT exclusive; anyone can enter.

1.6. National Championship Points System

1.6.1. One point per finishing position will be awarded to all competing teams. For example, 1 point for 1st, 2 points for 2nd, 3 points for 3rd, etc.

1.6.2. Points will be calculated based on the top two (2) finishes for each team. All other finishes will be dropped.

=== National Championship winners ===
Year	Venue	National Champion	Car No.	Vehicle
2025	NCM Motorsports Park	Rockwell Autosport Development	12	1999 Porsche Boxster
2024	NCM Motorsports Park	Atlanta Speedwerks	996	1999 Porsche Boxster
2023	Road Atlanta	Rockwell Autosport Development	12	1999 Porsche Boxster
2021	Ozarks International Raceway	Visceral Racing Group	959	1988 Porsche 944RSR
2019	Charlotte Motor Speedway	DamSon Racing	346	1999 BMW E46

The 2021 National Championship (for the 2021 season) was held on April 29 – May 1, 2022 at Ozarks International Raceway.

== 2026 season schedule ==
Schedule
Date	Event	Venue	Format
February 6–7	The PartsBadger 14-Hours at Road Atlanta	Road Atlanta	Test + 14 Hour
February 28-March 1	RaceRx at G2 Motorsports Park	G2 Motorsports Park	8 Hour + 7 Hour
March 14–15	The Old Dominion Enduro	Dominion Raceway	8 Hour + 7 Hour
April 11	SILICONSKY 14 Hours of Daytona	Daytona International Speedway	14 Hour
April 18–19	Cookie Cutter Classic	Gingerman Raceway	8 Hour + 7 Hour
May 2–3	Harris Hill Spring Double	Harris Hill Raceway	8 Hour + 7 Hour
May 22–24	SILICONSKY Twin 7's at the Glen	Watkins Glen International	7 Hour + 7 Hour
June 13–14	The Joliet Grand Prix at Autobahn Country Club	Autobahn Country Club	8 Hour + 7 Hour
June 27–28	Sebring Under the Stars 12-Hour	Sebring International Raceway	12 Hour
July 24–25	The New England Enduro	Lime Rock Park	7 Hour + 8 Hour
July 31-August 2	The Rollercoaster Revival at VIR Full	Virginia International Raceway	8 Hour + 7 Hour
August 22	The Thompson 12	Thompson Speedway Motorsports Park	12 Hour
September 4–6	The Fast Parts Grand Prix at Mid-Ohio	Mid-Ohio Sports Car Course	Test + 8 Hour + 7 Hour
September 19–20	The Eye of the Storm Sebring Enduro	Sebring International Raceway	8 Hour + 7 Hour
September 26–27	The Gauntlet: Come and Take It	Harris Hill Raceway	8 Hour + 7 Hour
October 10–11	The Tricky Triangle Enduro	Pocono Raceway	8 Hour + 7 Hour
October 24–25	The Landjager Cup	Road America	8 Hour + 7 Hour
October 31-November 1	AMPed Up Duals	Atlanta Motorsports Park	8 Hour + 7 Hour
November 7–8	Show-Me State Showdown	Ozarks International Raceway	8 Hour + 7 Hour
December 5–6	The 2026 TireRack.com National Championship at VIR	Virginia International Raceway	8 Hour + 7 Hour
December 29–31	The Lone Star Double Down at COTA	Circuit of the Americas	Test + 8 Hour + 8 Hour
