= Hutchinson Island =

Hutchinson Island may refer to:

- Hutchinson Island (Florida), United States
- Hutchinson Island (Georgia), United States
- Hutchinson Island (Antarctica)
