= Talladega Gran Prix Raceway =

American race track

"Little Tally"
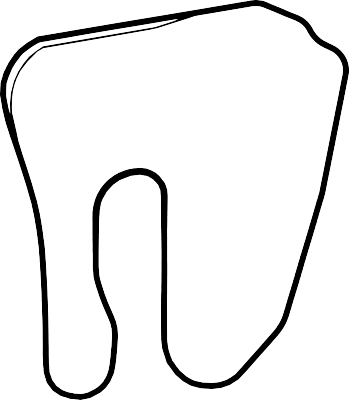
- Location: Talladega County, near Munford, Alabama, United States of America
- Coordinates: 33°30′10.07″N 86°0′3.58″W
- Opened: 1985
- Architect: David and Mike Uproach and Gerald Rhodes
- Major events: SCCA, WERA Motorcycle Racing, Track days with a variety of groups

Talladega Gran Prix Raceway is a 1.33 mile (2.14 km) 10 turn road course located near Munford, Alabama. "Little Tally," as it is also known, has no affiliation with Talladega Superspeedway. Instead, it takes its name from the nearby Talladega National Forest.

== History ==
The track was originally built in 1985 by brothers David and Mike Upchurch, and Gerald Rhodes to provide a place for local road racing enthusiasts to race and practice. The track was also built with motorcycle racing in mind and the layout has no hard barriers anywhere that could injure a rider. For many years the track was used for car clubs events, motorcycle riding schools, and kart races, but the pavement of the track was notorious for being incredibly damaging to tires. It was common for those who drove their cars to the track to find themselves unable to drive home due to shredded tires. In 2000, the track was completely repaved with a much better surface, and the middle section of the track was lengthened. These improvements brought in many more events and now most weekends are booked by a variety of car clubs, schools, and track days.

== Layout ==
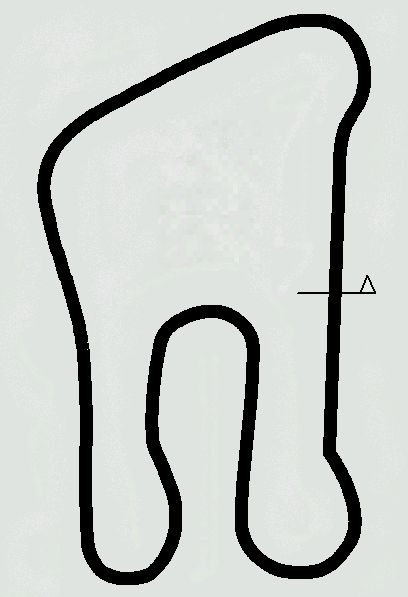
The old track layout

The track is run in both clockwise and counterclockwise directions. Generally during schools and track days the course will be run one way in the morning, and the other after a lunch or instruction break. Races may run the same way all weekend, or one way one day, the other the next. The track rewards handling over horsepower as its straights are very short, and the corners are reasonably long and fast. The Talladega Gran Prix Raceway was redesigned and repaved in 2007.

== Location ==
The track is approximately 3 miles (4.8 km) southwest of Munford on State Route 21. The area is mostly pastures and farmland and the track is easy to miss for those unfamiliar with its location. Map Coordinates: 33°30′10.07″N 86°0′3.58″W
