= Driveway Austin =

Motorsports track in Texas, 2005 to 2021

The Driveway
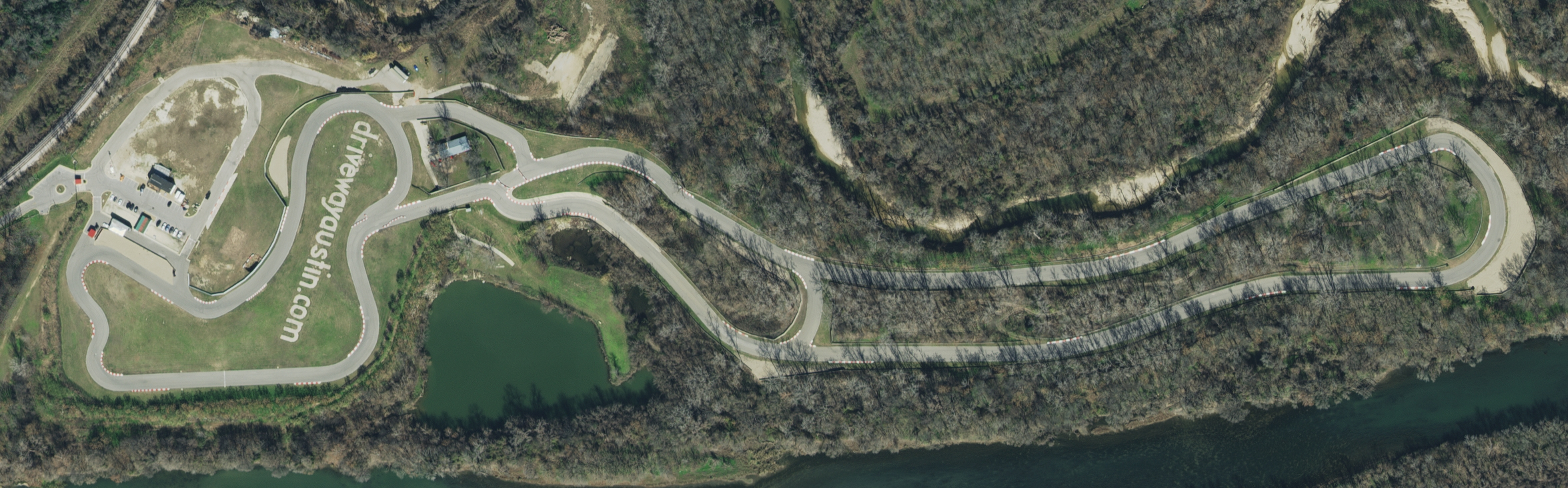
- Aerial view in 2015
- Location: Austin, Texas; United States
- Coordinates: 30.263343°N 97.656759°W
- Owner: Oracle Corporation
- Address: 8400 Delwau Lane; Austin, TX 78725
- Opened: September 2005
- Closed: December 2021
- Architect: Bill Dollahite (designer)
- Website: https://drivewayaustin.com/

Short Course
- Length: 0.70 mi (1.12 km)
- Turns: 7

Elevation Course
- Length: 0.94 mi (1.52 km)
- Turns: 11

Grand Prix Course
- Length: 1.61 mi (2.59 km)
- Turns: 14
- Race lap record: 1:14 (Scott Dollahite, Formula Atlantic, as of 2019)

Driveway Austin was a motorsports track and racing school in Austin, Texas. Former IMSA driver Bill Dollahite founded and operated the track as a racing school and motorsports retreat, educating drivers of all skill levels for 16 years until its closure in 2021.

== History ==
Driveway Austin was founder Bill Dollahite's legacy project after his career driving IMSA World Sports Cars came to a close, retiring with the Ferrari 333 SP. Dollahite intended to create a European-style, Formula 1-inspired track that operates purely as a racing school. He spent two years looking for the site and in 2003 settled on 50 acres (20 ha) of riverbank where Walnut Creek joins the Colorado River in east Austin. The site was formerly earmarked for an industrial site that never materialized and had become a landfill.

Bill Dollahite co-founded the track with local investors JB Hager and John Korioth with further investment from 25 others. Dollahite designed every aspect of the track, drawing inspiration from internationally renowned circuits such as Imola, Monaco, and Road Atlanta. The initial "Short Course" was complete by September 2005 at which point development on the rest of the track started, including three years of engineering and planning. On October 10, 2007 the track held a groundbreaking ceremony for the coming additions. Construction of the "Grand Prix Course" and all other configurations began in 2008 and was completed by year's end. After almost five years in development, the Driveway was fully complete. It was the first road course of its kind in the Austin area, the "Short Course" opening before Harris Hill Raceway in San Marcos.

Driveway Austin got its name after an incident with a city inspector, who visited the track while Dollahite and friends were running laps on the first layout of paved track. Dollahite fibbed that it was not a race track but merely a driveway to the existing 1954 home on the property.

It served as a school but also a retreat for auto enthusiasts. Early on, the track mostly held autocross and karting events. Over the years, the training program taught everyone from teenagers and first responders to professional racing drivers. The track has been used for performance driving, manufacturer testing, and media sessions (including film and photography).

Sebastian Vettel lapped the track while in Austin for the 2015 Formula 1 United States Grand Prix. RADwood, a show highlighting 1980s and '90s cars, took place at the track in 2019 and 2020.

In 2019 when asked about the future of the Driveway, Dollahite expressed his gratitude in sharing the track with the community over the years, stated that the track has matured to have a life of its own, and mentioned his inevitable retirement.

Driveway Austin closed in December 2021 after operating for 16 years. Dollahite sold the property to Oracle Corporation on December 28, 2021 in a deal with the City of Austin. Oracle purchased the land in exchange for permission to expand its campus to an additional 9 acres (3.6 ha) of city-owned land along Lady Bird Lake. Oracle will give the Driveway to the City of Austin who will add it to the surrounding parkland, likely remaining intact as a place for cycling and walking.

== Track facility ==
Driveway Austin is a scenic tree-lined road course elevated from the river on its south border and surrounded by greenbelt including a perimeter hiking and biking trail. With its designation as a racing school and hosting no sanctioned races, the track lacks grandstands and the amenities of a major race track, instead opting for training facilities. The only way to drive the track was as a student or for entertainment—not for competition.

The track, which is run counterclockwise, has three main layouts focusing on different dynamic elements.

- L1, the 0.7-mile (1.1 km) 7-turn "Short Course", was inspired by Fiorano and tests flat surface handling, mostly under 80 mph (130 km/h). The most technical course, it has sweepers, double apex, and late apex turns.
- L2, the 0.95-mile (1.53 km) 11-turn "Elevation Course", features varying elevation and features a Laguna Seca type corkscrew and a "bus stop" switchback.
- L3, the 1.61-mile (2.59 km) 14-turn "Grand Prix Course", emphasizes high-speed driving with corners taken from the Nürburgring and Road America. Most cars top out over 100 mph (160 km/h), especially on the longest straight of 2,500 ft (760 m).

In accordance with FIA safety specifications, the track is outfitted with gravel pits, soft walls, and hard walls to contain out of control cars.

== Driveway Series ==
The track is home to the Driveway Series, a popular weekly bicycling race held Thursday evenings comprising 32 races from April through October each year. The criterium consists of several high intensity laps varying in length depending on skill category. The event has been held since 2006 and grown in popularity over the years. Over 200 riders competed in 2012 and about 400 riders took part as of the 2020 season.
