= Harris Hill Raceway =

Motorsport track in the United States

H2R
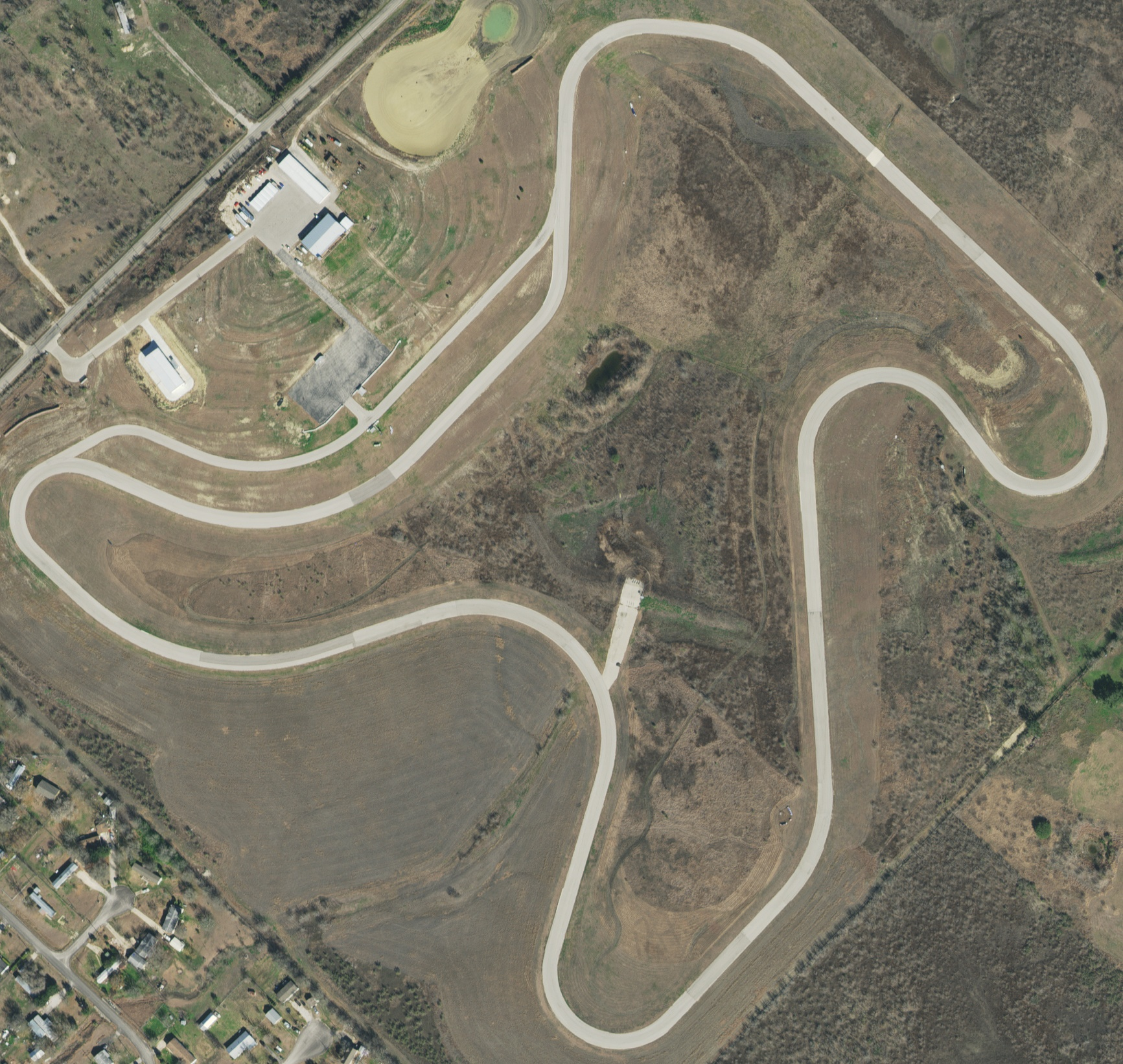
- Harris Hill Raceway in 2015
- Location: San Marcos, Texas, United States
- Coordinates: 29.918892°N 97.873258°W
- Owner: Bo Rivers
- Address: 2840 Harris Hill Road; San Marcos, TX 78666
- Broke ground: Summer 2007
- Opened: June 2008; 18 years ago
- Architect: David Donovan
- Website: http://harrishillroad.com/
- Surface: asphalt
- Length: 1.82 mi (2.93 km)
- Turns: 11
- Race lap record: 1:10.348 (Ollie Millroy, McLaren 720S GT3, 2021)

Harris Hill Raceway (H2R) is a paved road racing track in San Marcos, Texas used for both auto and motorcycle racing.

== History ==
Harris Hill Raceway was conceived as a local place to drive high-performance cars, responding to the lack of club-based tracks in Central Texas. The track was founded by Bo Rivers with his daughter Dacia and her spouse Eric Beverding. The track was paved in December 2007 and officially opened in June 2008. The track broadened its offerings to driver education, corporate events, and team programs in response to the Great Recession, and gained sponsorship from Austin-area Mazda dealers. The track had 200 members as of 2011.

In summer 2020 the track re-paved the rough surface and brought the back section between turns 6 and 7 inward to allow construction of FM 110.

The track includes a sports car club and a motorcycle club that each hold regular hours for members. Harris Hill also hosts H2R Challenge (Miata, 914, and Mustang classes), Longhorn Racing Academy (HPDE) and other driver training courses, SCCA's Track Night in America, ChampCar Endurance Series, and press events.

== Track description ==
Situated in the hills of northeastern San Marcos, Harris Hill was designed to feel like a drive through the Texas Hill Country. The 11-turn track is 1.82 mi (2.93 km) long and 36 ft (11 m) wide. It features positive and negative camber turns, a sweeper, increasing and decreasing radius turns, and two blind corners. Turn 4, named for the patron saint of impossible tasks Santa Rita, has an 80 ft (24 m) change in elevation up and down. The overall track elevation change is 70 ft (21 m). The circuit is run clockwise (typical) or counter-clockwise directions. The longest straight is 962 ft (293 m).

Built upon 150 acres (0.61 km^{2}) of clay soil of the Texas Blackland Prairies, Harris Hill develops bumps that add to its character.

The property contains a clubhouse with amenities, a garage with a mechanic, a banked dirt oval track, and a rally course just inside the paved track.
