= List of motorsport championships =

This list of motorsport championships is a list of notable national and international motorsport championships decided by the points or positions earned by a driver from multiple races across multiple disciplines from past and present.

In recent years, motorsport championships such as Formula One, NASCAR Cup Series, the World Rally Championship have become "spectacularized" for the media to boost their popularity and financial success. In the United Kingdom, there are more than 100 clubs organising championships.

== Car racing ==
=== Single-seater Open wheel racing ===
==== Formula cars ====
===== Championship level =====
- Formula One World Championship (Started from Grand Prix 1906)(Sanction by FIA 1946-47,Started 1950-)
- IndyCar Series (Started 1905-)(Sanctioned by Indycar 1996-)
- Japanese Super Formula (1973-)
- Formula E World Championship (2014/15-)

===== International - FIA pathway =====
- FIA Formula 2 Championship (Started 1948)(Rebranded from GP2 2017-)
- FIA Formula 3 Championship (2019-)(GP3 Series and FIA Formula 3 European Championship merge)
- Macau Grand Prix (1954-)(F3 & F4 World Cup)

===== Regional - FIA pathway =====
- Formula Regional Americas Championship (2018-)
- Formula Regional European Championship (2019-) (Formed by Formula Renault Eurocup & Formula regional Europe merge)
- Formula Regional Japanese Championship (2020-)
- Formula Regional Middle East Championship (2023-)
- Formula Regional Oceania Championship (Started 2005) (Rebranded from Toyota Racing Series in 2023-)

===== Other FIA Approved Formula 3 Championships =====
- Australian Formula Open (1964-)
- Austria Formula 3 Cup (1982-)
- Eurocup-3 (2023-)
- Eurocup-3 Spanish Winter Championship (2026-)
- Euroformula Open Championship (2001-)
- FIA Central European Zone Formula 3 (1984-)
- F2000 Italian Formula Trophy (2014-)
- GB3 (2013-)
- MSV F3 Cup (2011-)
- New Zealand Grand Prix (1950-)
- Super Formula Lights (2020-)

===== National (FIA Formula 4) =====
- French F4 Championship (2018-)
- Formula 4 CEZ Championship (2023–)
- Formula 4 United States Championship (2016–)
- F4 Chinese Championship (2015–)
- F4 Brazilian Championship (2022-)
- F4 British Championship (2015–)
- F4 Indian Championship (2023-)
- F4 Japanese Championship (2015–)
- F4 Saudi Arabian Championship (2024-)
- Italian Formula 4 Championship (2014-)
- NACAM Formula 4 Championship (2015–)
- Spanish Formula 4 Championship (2016–)
- South East Asia Formula 4 Championship (2016–)
- UAE4 Series (2026-)

===== Other FIA Approved Formula 4 Championships =====
- AU4 Championship (2015-)
- E4 Championship (2023-)
- Eurocup-4 Spanish Winter Championship (2026-)
- F1 Academy (2023-) (Female Only)
- Formula Beat (1993-)
- Formula Car Challenge (2005-)
- Fórmula Nacional Argentina (1980-)
- Formula Pro USA Western Championship (2019-)
- Formula Trophy UAE (2024-)
- Formula Winter Series (2023-)
- GB4 Championship (2022-)
- Kyojo Cup (2017-) (Female Only)
- Hoosier Formula Cup (2019-)
- Ligier Junior Formula Championships (2024-)
- Nordic 4 Championship (2017-)
- SMP F4 Championship (2015-)
- Super FJ (2007-Present)

===== Road to Indy =====
- Indy NXT (1977-)(Formerly Indy Lights)
- USF Pro 2000 Championship (1991-)
- USF2000 Championship (1990-)
- USF Juniors (2022-)
- YACademy Winter Series (2021-)

===== Formula Race Promotions =====
- Atlantic Championship Series (1974-)
- F2000 Championship Series (2006-)
- F1600 Championship Series (2011-)
- Pacific F2000 (2004-)

===== SCCA Club Racing Classes =====
- Formula Atlantic (1965-)
- Formula Continental (1979-)
- Formula Enterprises (2002-)
- Formula F (1966-)
- Formula Vee (1964-)

===== Formula Fords Series =====
- Australian Formula Ford Series (2014-)
- Formula Ford Festival (1972-)
- New Zealand Formula Ford Championship (1971-)
- South Australian Formula Ford Championship (2014-)
- Walter Hayes Trophy (2001-)

===== Formula Vee Series =====
- Formula First New Zealand Championship Series (1967-)

===== Non-FIA Formula Series =====
- Australian Drivers Championship (1957-)
- British Stock Car Association (1954-)
  - BriSCA Formula 1 Stock Cars World Championship
  - BriSCA Formula 2 Stock Cars
- BOSS GP (1995-)
- Eurocup-5 (2027-)
- Formula Nordic (2013-)
- Indian Racing League (2019-)
- JK Tyre National Racing Championship (1997-)
- Monoposto Racing Club (1959-)
- Skip Barber Racing Series (1975-)
- Superstox (1954-)
- Supermodified Racing (1950-)

===== Formula student engineering competition =====
- Formula Student
- Formula SAE
- Formula SAE Australasia
- ETSEIB Motorsport
- IIT Bombay Racing
- University of Patras Formula Student Team - UoP Racing Team
- Greenpower Education Trust

===== Former single–seater championships =====
- A1 Grand Prix (2005–2009)
- ADAC Formel Masters (2008-2014)
- AIACR European Championship (1931–1939)
- All-Japan Formula Three Championship (1979–2019)
- Asian Formula Three Championship (2001–2008)
- ATS Formel 3 Cup (2003–2014)
- Australian Formula 2 Championship(1964-2009)
- Australian Formula 3 Championship (1964-1977)(First Era)
- Auto GP (1999-2016)
- Barber Dodge Pro Series (1986–2003)
- British Formula One Series (1978–1982)
- Brazilian Formula Three Championship (1990–1994)
- British Formula Two Championship (1989-1997)
- British Formula Three Championship (1951–2014)
- Championship Auto Racing Teams (1979-2003)
- Champcar World Series (2004-2008)
- Challenge Formule Renault Europe (1968–1977)
- EFDA Formula Ford 1600 Euroseries (1979–1987)
- ERA Championship (2022)
- EuroBOSS Series (1995–2010)
- European Formula Two Championship(1967-1984)
- FIA Formula 3 International Trophy (2011)
- FIA Masters Historic Formula One Championship (2013-2023)
- FIA European Formula Three Championship (1975–1984, 2012-2018)
- Finnish Formula Three Championship (1958-2010)
- FJ1600(1980-2009)
- Formula F100 (1970-1972)
- Formula 600 (1994-2024)
- Formula 1000 (2010-2019)
- Formula 1430 (1971-1985)
- Formula 3000 (1985-2010)
- Formula 5000 (1967-1976)
- Formula Abarth (formerly Formula Azzurra)(2010-2013)
- Formula Acceleration 1 (2014)
- Fórmula Academy Sudamericana (2014-2019)
- Formula BMW (1998-2013)
- Formula BMW World Final (2005–2008)
- Formula Challenge Japan (2006-2013)
- Formula Chrysler Euroseries (2001)
- Formula Dream (1999-2005)
- Formula GM Lotus Euro Series (1988-1999)
- Formula Holden (1989-2007)
- Formula Junior Diamond Jubilee World Tour (2016–2018)
- Formula K (1980–1995 in México)
- Formula LO (2000-2012)
- Formula LGB Swift (2004-2022)
- Formula LGB Hyundai (2007-2009)
- Formula Mazda (1999-2019)
- Formula Masters China (2011-2017)
- Formula Maruti (1999-2011)
- Formula Mondial (1983-1986)
- Formula Novis (2002)
- Formula Palmer Audi (1998–2010)
- Formula Pacific (1977-1982)
- Formula Renault (2000-2020)
- Formula Rus (2002-2007)
- Formula Super Vee (1971-1990)
- Formula Suzuki Kei Sport (2001-2008)
- Formula Suzuki Hayabusa (2000-2003)
- Formula Toyota (1990-2007)
- Formula Three Euroseries (2003–2012)
- Formula Three Sudamericana (1987–2013)
- Formula Woman (2004-2006)(2021-2023)
- French Formula Three Championship (1978–2002)
- German Formula Three Championship (1950-2014)
- GP2 Series (2005–2016)
- GP2 Asia Series (2008–2011)
- GP3 Series (2010-2018)
- Grand Prix Masters (2005–2007)
- International Formula 3000 (1985–2004)
- International Formula 3 Korea Super Prix (1999–2004, 2010–2011)
- International Formula 3 Race (1969–1972, 1983)
- International Formula Master (2005–2009)
- Italian Formula Three Championship (1974–2012)
- Japanese Formula Two Championship (1978–1986)
- Japanese Formula 3 Championship (1979-2019)
- MRF Challenge (2013-2023)
- Mexican Formula Two (1990-2002)
- Mexican Formula Three Championship (1990–2002)
- Peking to Paris (1907)
- Russian Formula Three Championship (1997–2002, 2008)
- Soviet Formula 2 Championship (1962-1975)
- Superleague Formula (2008–2011)
- Swiss Formula 3 Championship (1967–2008)
- Tasman Series (1964-1975)
- Trophées de France (1964-1967)
- Turkish Formula Three Championship (1994-2006)
- United States Formula Three Championship (2000–2001)
- World Cup (1992–1994)
- World Manufacturers' Championship (1925–1930)
- W Series (2019–2022)
- World Series by Nissan (1998–2004)
- World Series Formula V8 3.5 (2016–2017)
- World Series Lights (2002–2004)

==== Sprint Car (or Speed Car) ====
- United States Auto Club
  - USAC Silver Crown Series
  - USAC Sprint Car National Championship
  - USAC National Midget Series
  - USAC/CRA Sprint Car Series
  - USAC MRA Sprint Cars
  - USAC Western States Midget Series
  - USAC East Coast Sprint Car Series
  - USAC Midwest Thunder SpeeD2 Midget
  - USAC Southwest Sprint Car Series
  - NASCAR Youth Series
- American Sprint Car Series
- All Star Circuit of Champions
- Australian Speedcar Championship
- Castro Flo Racing Night in America
- High Limit Racing
- Hydraulink War of the Wings
- POWRi Racing
- Oval Superstars Tour
- V8 Hotstox
- World of Outlaws Sprint Cars

=== Karting ===
- FIA Karting World Championship(1964-)
- Andrea Margutti Trophy(1990-)
- Armed Forces Karting Championship (2009–present)
- Australian Superkart Championship (1989–)
- British Superkart Championship (2008-)
- British Schools Karting Championship (2003–)
- British Universities Karting Championship (2001-)
- Champions of the Future (2025-)
- Club100 (1993–present)
- FAT Karting League(2021-)
- FIA Karting Arrive-and-Drive World Cup(2026-)
- FIA Karting European Championship (1972-)
- German Kart Championship (1962-)
- IAME Karting Motorsport(1968-)
- Italian ACI Karting Championship (1997-)
- Portuguese Karting Championship (2007-)
- Rotax Max Challenge (2000-)
- ROK by VORTEX(2020-)
- SKUSA SuperNationals (1997-)
- Spanish Karting Championship (2004-)
- Swedish Karting Championship (2005-)
- Super 1 National Kart Championships (1983-)
- T4 Series (1950-)
- United States Pro Kart Series(2013-)
- WSK Super Master Series (2010-)
- WSK Euro Series (2010-)
- WSK Final Cup (2011-)
- World Karting Association (1971-Present)

=== Closed cockpit racing ===
==== Sports car and Endurance Racing ====
===== Prototypes (LMH, LMDh, LMP2, LMP3) and Group GT3 (LMGT3 and GT Daytona) =====
- FIA World Endurance Championship (2012–Present) Hypercar, LMGT3 (LMP2 for 24 Hours of Le Mans Only)
- IMSA SportsCar Championship (2014–Present) GTP, LMP2, GTD Pro, GTD
- Asian Le Mans Series (2009/10-Present) Hypercar, LMP2, LMGT3
- European Le Mans Series (2004-Present) LMP2, LMP2 Pro Am, LMP3, LMGT3

===== LMP3 and Group GT3 /and GT4 =====
- Asian Le Mans Cup (2026/27-Present) LMP3, LMP3 Pro Am, LMGT3
- Império Endurance Brasil (2016-Present) LMP3, GT3, GT4
- IMSA SportsCar Challenge (2023–present) LMP3, GT4, M2 Cup
- Le Mans Cup & Road to Le Mans (2016-Present) LMP3, LMGT3

===== LMP3 and other prototype group racing =====
- Australian Prototype Series (2010-Present) LMP3
- Campionato Italiano Prototipi (2015-Present) Group CN
- European Endurance Prototype Cup (2019-Present) LMP3
- Ligier European Series (2024-Present) LMP4, GTC
- Prototype Cup Europe (2026-Present) LMP3
- Prototype Masters(2024-Present) LMP3, Group CN
- Prototype Winter Series (2024-Present) LMP3
- Sport Prototipo Argentino(2023-Present) Group CN

===== GT3 =====
- ADAC GT Masters (2007-Present)
- Deutsche Tourenwagen Masters (2000-Present)
- FIA GT World Cup (2019-Present)(Macau Grand Prix)
- GT3 Legends(2026-Present)
- GT3 Revival Series (2026-Present)
- GT World Challenge America (1984-Present)
- GT World Challenge Asia (2017-Present)
- GT World Challenge Australia (1960-Present)
- GT World Challenge Europe (2014-Present)
- GT World Challenge Europe Sprint Cup (2014-Present)
- GT World Challenge European Endurance Cup (2014-Present)
- Intercontinental GT Challenge (2016-Present)
- International GT Open (2006-Present)
- Italian GT Championship (1991-Present)

===== GT Cups (992 Cup, 296 Challenge, Super Trofeo, Ginetta) with GT3 or GT4 =====
- Belcar (2007-Present)
- Britcar (2005-Present)
- Campeonato de España de GT (1999-Present)
- Campeonato Nacional de Velocidade (1955-Present)
- China Endurance Championship(2017-Present)
- GT Challenge de las Américas(2023-Present)
- GT Cup Championship (2007-Present)
- GT Cup Open Europe (2019-Present)
- GT Cup Series (Europe)(2020-Present)
- International GT(2017-Present)
- National GT Challenge(Italy)(2023-Present)
- South African Endurance Series(2000-Present)
- South Island Endurance Series(2000-Present)

===== GT3 and GT4 (multi class endurance racing alongside touring and cups) =====
- 24H Series (2006-Present) GT3, GT4, 992 Cup, GTX, TCR, TCX, TCE
- 24H Series Middle East (2022-Present) GT3, GT4, 992 Cup, GTX, TCR, TCX, TCE
- APEX One(2025-Present) GT3, GT4, 992 Cup, TCX, TCE
- Austrian GT(2025-Present) GT3, GT4, GTC, 992 Cup, TCR, TC
- British GT Championship (1993-Present) GT3, GT4
- China GT Championship(2025-Present) GT3, GT4, GTC
- CEZ Circuit Endurance(2018-Present) GT3, GT4, GTC, TCR
- Danish Endurance Championship(2020-Present) GT3, GT4, 992 Cup, GTX, TCR
- DMV Super Touring & GT Cup(2023-Present) GT3, GT4, GTC, TCR
- GT America Series (2021-Present) GT3, GT4, GT2, 992 Cup
- GT Series Cup Brasil(2024-Present) GT3, GT4
- GT Summer Series(2026-Present) GT3, GT4, 992 Cup
- GT Winter Series (2021-Present) GT3, GT4, GT2
- Golf Pro Car(2023-Present) GT3, GT4, GTC, TCR
- Kennol GT Endurance Cup (2019-Present) GT3, GT4, GTC
- Nürburgring Langstrecken-Serie (1977-Present) GT3, GT4, TCR, TC
- SRO Japan Cup (2023-Present) GT3, GT4, 992 Cup
- Supercar Challenge (2001-Present) GT3, GT4, GTC, TCR, TCE
- Super Taikyu Series (1991-Present) GT3, GT4, TCR, Group N
- Thailand Super Series (2018-Present) GT3, GT4, GTM
- Ultimate GT-Sprint Cup (2025-Present) GT3, GT4, GTC
- Ultimate Winter Cup (2026-Present) GT3, GT4, GTC

===== GT4 =====
- ADAC GT4 Germany (2019-Present)
- FFSA GT4 France (1997-Present)
- GTC Endurance Challenge(2026-Present) GT4, TCR
- GT4 America Series (2019-Present)
- GT4 Australia Series (2024-Present)
- GT4 European Series (2007-Present)
- GT4 Italy (2023-Present)
- GT4 Russia (2023-Present)
- GT4 Winter Series (2024-Present)
- Michelin Pilot Challenge (1997-Present) GT4, TCR
- Scandinavian Touring Car Championship (2011-2024 as TCR)(2027-Present as GT4)
- SRO GT Cup (2025-Present)
- Supercars Endurance Series (2024-Present)(GT4 South) GT4, TCR
- Summerset GT New Zealand(2020-Present) GT4, GTC

===== Open GT, TA/TA2, GT500/GT300, or other silhouette racing cars =====
- Aussie Racing Cars (2001-Present)
- Australian National Trans-Am Series (2020-Present)
- ChampCar Endurance Series (2009-Present)
- CUBE 3 Architecture TA2 Series (2009-Present)
- GRIDLIFE GT (2013-Present)
- National Sports Sedan Series (1976-Present)
- NBF GT Championship(2008-Present)
- Russian Endurance Challenge(2025-Present)
- Súper Copa Roshfrans GTM(2024-Present)
- Super GP Americas(2025-Present)
- Super GT (1993-Present)
- Superrace Championship (2006-Present)
- Super Turbo Thailand(2022-Present)
- Trans-Am Series (1966-Present)
- TA2 Racing Muscle Car Series (2017-Present)
- TA2 NZ (1995-Present)
- World Racing league(2020-Present)
- Zenith Racing Series(2026-Present)

===== Other (GT2, Group N, and Club racing) =====
- 750 Motor Club (1939-Present)
- Australian Auto Sport Alliance (2003-Present)
- British Automobile Racing Club (1912-Present)
- British Racing and Sports Car Club (1946-Present)
- C1 Racing Club(2020-Present)
- Carburando Zonal(2020-Present)
- DMV Goodyear Racing Days(2025-Present)
- Dutch National Racing Team(1976-Present)
- FIA Motorsports Games (2019-Present)(Single end of year Event with all Motorsport drivers Participating)
- GT2 European Series (2015-Present)
- Korea Automobile Racing Association (1996-Present)
- Race of Champions (1988-Present)(Single end of year Event with all Motorsport drivers Champions Participating)
- Motorsport Vision (1997-Present)
- National Auto Sport Association (1991-Present)
- SCCA Regional Road Racing (1950-Present)
- SCCA U.S Majors Tour (2020-Present)
- SCCA Hoosier Super Tour (2024-Present)
- SCCA National Championships Runoffs (1964-Present)
- WA Sporting Car Club (1929-Present)

===== Historic Motorsport =====
- Classic Sports Car Club(2020-Present)
- Classic Endurance Racing (2004-Present)
- Club de Automóviles Sport(1948-)
- Equipe Classic Racing(2024-Present)
- Historic Sports Car Club(2000-Present)
- Historic Sportscar Racing (2022-Present)(Also Known as IMSA HSR Prototype Challenge)
- Histo Cup(1998-Present)
- Le Mans Classic (2008-Present)
- Legends Of Le Mans Series(2026-Present)
- Masters Historic Racing(2004-Present)
- Motor Racing Legends | Historic Motor Racing Series(2000-Present)
- Peter Auto Le Mans Classic Series(2000-Present)
- Sportscar Vintage Racing Association (1981-Present)
- Vintage Sports Car Club (1934-Present)

==== Stock car ====
===== NASCAR =====
====== National Series ======
- NASCAR Cup Series
- NASCAR O'Reilly Auto Parts Series
- NASCAR Craftsman Truck Series

====== International ======
- NASCAR Brazil Series (Formerly NASCAR Brazil Sprint Race)
- NASCAR Canada Series (Formerly the CASCAR Super Series and Pinty's Series)
- NASCAR Euro Series (Formerly Whelen Euro Series)
- NASCAR Mexico Series (Formerly the NASCAR Mexico Corona Series, NASCAR Toyota Series, PEAKS Mexico Series, and established as Desafío Corona.)
- NASCAR Mikel's Trucks Series

====== Regional ======
- ARCA Menards Series
- ARCA Menards Series East
- ARCA Menards Series West
- NASCAR Local Racing Series
- NASCAR Whelen Modified Tour

===== National Stock Car Series =====
- American Speed Association
  - ASA Midwest Tour
  - ASA Southern Super Series
  - ASA STARS National Tour
- American Canadian Tour
  - American-Canadian Series
  - Série ACT Quebec
  - ACT Sportsman Quebec
- Champion Racing Association
  - CRA Super Series
  - JEGS/CRA All-Stars Tour
  - CRA Sportsman Series
  - CRA Street Stock Series
- Allison Legacy Series
- CARS Tour
- IHRA Stock Cars
- IMCA Stock Car
- IMCA Sport Compact
- Mid-American Stock Car Series
- Midwest Truck Series
- Monster Mini Stock Association
- Northwest Super Late Model Series
- Pro All Star Series
- UARA Series

===== Modified Stock Car Racing =====
- IMCA Modified
- Legends car racing
- Modified Racing Series
- Race of Champions
- SMART Modified Tour

===== Late Model Dirt Racing =====
- World of Outlaws Late Model Series
- Lucas Oil Late Model Dirt Series
- IMCA Latemodel
- Super DIRTcar Series
- WISSOTA Dirt Track Series

===== International Stock Car Series =====
- APC United Late Model Series
- Banger racing
- Maritime Pro Stock Tour
- National Hot Rods
- Superstocks
- Turismo Carretera
  - TC Junior
  - TC Mouras
  - TC Pista Mouras
  - TC PIsta
  - TC Pick Up
  - TC Platense
  - TC Rioplatense
  - TC Pista Pick Up
  - Turismo Pista
- V8 Thunder Cars

==== Touring car ====
===== International level =====
- FIA TCR World Tour

===== Regional level =====
- TCR Asia Series
- TCR Europe Touring Car Series
- TCR Eastern European Trophy
- TCR South American Championship
- Stock Car Pro Series
- Supercars Championship

===== National level (TCR Sanctioned) =====
- TCR Asia Challenge
- TCR Brasil Touring Car Championship
- TCR Chinese Taipei Series
- TCR China Challenge
- TCR China Touring Car Championship
- TCR European Endurance
- TCR Italian Touring Car Championship
- TCR Mexico Series
- TCR Panamá Touring Car Championship
- TCR Russia Touring Car Championship
- TCR Spain Touring Car Championship
- TCR UK Touring Car Championship

===== National level (Non-TCR Sanctioned) =====
- Argentina Corredores Turismo Carretera
- British Touring Car Championship
- Baltic Touring Car Championship
- China Touring Car Championship
- Irish Touring Car Championship
- Malaysia Championship Series
- Portuguese Touring Car Championship
- Spanish Touring Car Championship
- Sports Car Championship Canada
- South African Touring Cars Championship
- Turismo National
- Turismo Nacional BR
- U.S. Touring Car Championship

===== Pathway Series (Non TCR) =====
- GRIDLFE Touring Cup
- Improved Production Racing Association of Australia
- Junior Saloon Car Championship
- Mexico Racing Cup
- Mitjet International
- NAPA Central Muscle Cars
- NXT Gen Cup
- Stock Light
- Super2 Series
- TC 2000
- TC America Series
- TC France Series
- Top Race V6
- Tourenwagen Junior Cup
- Touring Car Masters

Touring Car Endurance Races

- 25 Hours of Thunderhill
- 24 Hours of LeMons
- Aurum 1006 km

==== One-Design Racing ====
- 944 Cup
- 992 Endurance Cup
- ADAC Opel GSE Rally Cup
- Alpine Elf Europa Cup
- AMG Cup Brazil
- BMW & MINI Racing
- BMW CCA Club Racing
- BMW Challenge
- BMW M2 Cup DTM
- BMW M2 Cup Brasil
- BMW M2 Cup Iberia
- BMW Racing Cup
- Canada Challenge Series
- Caterham Academy
- Civic Cup
- Dacia Logan Cup
- Ferrari Challenge (Australasia, Europe, Japan, Middle East, UK, US)
- Ford Mustang Challenge
- Ford Mustang Cup Australia
- Ford Mustang Cup USA
- Fun Cup
- Ginetta GT Championship
- Ginetta Junior Championship
- GR86/BRZ Cup Japan
- GR 86 Championship New Zealand
- GR 86 Cup China
- GR Cup Australia
- GR Cup North America
- GR Cup Spain
- GR Philippine Cup
- GR South Africa Cup
- GR Vios Challenge Malaysia
- GR Yaris Cup Japan
- GR Yaris Cup Qatar
- GR Yaris MORIZO Challenge Cup (Rallying)
- Hyundai HB20 Cup
- Hyundai N Festival
- Isuzu Challenge Thailand
- Lamborghini Super Trofeo (Asia, Europe, US)
- Ligier JS Cup France
- Lotus Cup China
- Lotus Cup Europe (European GT Lite Challenge)
- Lotus Cup Italia
- Lotus Cup Japan
- Lotus Cup UK
- Mazda MX-5 Cup (US & Benelux)
- Mazda Racing Super Series
- Mclaren Trophy America
- Mclaren Trophy Europe
- Mini Challenge UK
- Porsche Carrera Cup (40+ series globally)
- Porsche Supercup
- Polo Cup Benelux
- Polo Cup Germany
- Polo Cup India
- Polo Cup Middle East
- Radical Motorsports (10+ series globally)
- Renault Clio Cup (10+ series globally, Road and Rally)
- Stellantis Rally Cup Ireland & Rally Trophy UK
- Stellantis Rally Cup North America
- Suzuki Rally Cup
- TVR Tuscan Challenge

=== Rallying ===
==== Championships ====
===== International =====
- World Rally Championship
- World Rally Championship 2
- World Rally Championship 3
- Junior World Rally Championship
- FIA EcoRally Cup
- FIA Rally Star

==== Regional Zone ====
- African Rally Championship
- Asia-Pacific Rally Championship
- Central European Zone Rally Championship
- Codasur South American Rally Championship
- European Rally Championship
- European Rally Trophy
- European Historic Rally Championship
- ERC Fiesta Rally3 Trophy
- Middle East Rally Championship
- NACAM Rally Championship
- Tour European Rally

==== National ====
- American Rally Association
- Australian Rally Championship
- British Rally Championship
- Campeonato Nacional de Ralis (Portugal)
- Canadian Rally Championship
- Czech Rally Championship
- Estonian Rally Championship
- Finnish Rally Championship
- French Rally Championship
- German Rally Championship
- Hungarian Rally Championship
- Indian National Rally Championship
- Italian Rally Championship
- Irish Forest Rally Championship
- Irish Tarmac Rally Championship
- Latvian Rally Championship
- Lebanese Rally Championship
- Lithuanian Rally Championship
- NASA Rally Sport (USA)
- National Rally Championship (Ireland)
- New Zealand Rally Championship
- Polish Rally Championship
- Romanian Rally Championship
- Scottish Rally Championship
- Slovak Rally Championship
- Spanish Rally Championship
- Spanish Rally Championship for Historic Vehicles
- Spanish Super Rally Championship
- Spanish Asphalt Rally Cup
- Spanish Dirt Rally Cup
- South African National Rally Championship

==== Notable Rallies ====
- Acropolis Rally
- Central Europe Rally
- Cholistan Desert Jeep Rally
- International Rally of Johor
- Monte Carlo Rally
- Olympus Rally
- Rally Argentina
- Rally de Catalunya
- Rally China
- Rally Japan
- Rally New Zealand
- Rally Poland
- Rally de Portugal
- Rallye Sanremo
- Rally Sweden
- Safari Rally
- Targa Newfoundland
- Tour de Corse
- Tulip Rally
- Ypres Rally

==== Rally raid ====
- World Rally-Raid Championship
- Silk Way Rally
  - Abu Dhabi Desert Challenge
  - Africa Eco Race
  - Budapest-Bamako
  - Dakar Rally
  - Desafío Ruta 40
  - Rallye du Maroc

==== Rally Baja ====
- FIA World Baja Cup
- FIA European Baja Cup
  - Baja 1000
  - Baja 4000
  - Baja Aragón
  - Dubai International Baja
  - Jordan Baja
  - Northern Forest (race)

==== Rallycross ====
- FIA European Rallycross Championship
- FIA Rallycross World Cup
- British Rallycross Championship (United Kingdom)
- BTRDA Clubmans Rallycross Championship
- Campionato Italiano Rallycross
- Championnat de France Rallycross
- Central European Zone Rallycross
- Copa de España de Rallycross
- Deutsche Rallycross Meisterschaft
- Irish Rallycross Championship
- RallyX
- SCCA RallyCross (United States)

=== Off-road racing ===
- Extreme H (2025-)

==== Short Course Off Road Racing ====
- Australian Off Road Championship (1981-)
- AMSOIL Championship Off Road Racing (2020-)
- Championship Off-Road Racing (2026-)(CORR)
- National Off-Road Racing Association (NORRA)(1967-)

==== Stadium Off Road Racing ====
- Stadium Super Trucks (2013–)

==== Desert Off Road Racing ====
- Best in the Desert (2008-)
- Bonneville Offroad Racing (1989-)
- Ultra 4 King of the Hammers (2008-)
- SCORE International (1973-)
- Southern Nevada Off Road Enthusiasts (SNORE)(2020-)
- Valley Off Road Racing Association(VORRA)(1975–present)

=== Other ===
==== AutoCross and Autotesting ====
- FIA European Autocross and Cross Car Championships
- British Autograss
- Championnat d'Europe Autocross
- Campeonato de España de Autocross
- Gymkhana
- NASA HPDE
- SCCA AutoCross Solos

==== Drag racing ====
- NHRA Championship Drag Racing Series
- NHRA Sportsman Drag Racing Series
- IHRA Drag Racing
- FIA European Drag Racing Championships
- Australian National Drag Racing Association
- Top Doorslammer

==== Drifting ====
- FIA International Drifting Cup
- Formula Drift
- Formula Drift Japan
- D1 Grand Prix
- D1NZ
- Drift Masters
- GRIDLIFE Drifting
- Russian Drifting Series

==== Hillclimb ====
- FIA European Hill Climb Championship
- FIA Hill Climb Masters
- FIA International Hill Climb Cup
- Australian Hillclimb Championship
- British Hill Climb Championship
- Campeonato de España de Montaña
- Championnat de France de la Montagne
- Falperra International Hill Climb
- Goodwood Festival of Speed
- Monti Iblei Cup(Campionato italiano velocità montagna)
- Pikes Peak International Hillclimb

==== Time Trial or Time Attack Racing ====
- Global Time Attack
- GRIDLIFE Time Attack
- NASA Time Attack
- Redline Time Attack
- SCCA Time Attack
- World Time Attack Challenge

==== Truck racing ====
- FIA European Truck Racing Championship (Europe)

===== National Series =====
- British Truck Racing Championship
- Campeonato de España de Carreras de Camiones
- Championnat de France Camions FFSA
- Copa Truck
- Fórmula Trucks
- New Zealand Super Truck
- Súper Copa Roshfrans
- Trial camion

===== Pickup truck racing =====
- Pickup truck racing (UK)
- SuperUtes Series (Utility Trucks)

==== Monster Truck Entertainment ====
- Monster Jam

==== Autonomous racing ====
- Abu Dhabi Autonomous Racing League (2024-)
- DARPA Grand Challenge (2004-2007)
- Indy Autonomous Challenge (2021-)
- Roborace (2017-2020)

== Motorcycles ==
Motorcycle sport

Road racing

- Superbike Racing

=== International ===
- Fédération Internationale de Motocyclisme

==== Championship Level ====
- MotoGP World Championship
- Superbike World Championship
- Women's Circuit Racing World Championship

==== Feeder Series ====
- Moto2 World Championship
- Moto3 World Championship
- JuniorGP World Championship
- FIM MotoMini World Series
- FIM Yamaha R3 BLU BRU World Cup
- Red Bull MotoGP Rookies Cup
- Supersport World Championship
- Sportbike World Championship

==== International Cups and National Series ====
- Asia Road Racing Championships
- Moto2 European Championship
- Moto4 Asia Cup
- Moto4 British Cup
- Moto4 European Talent Cup
- Moto4 Latin Cup
- Moto4 Northern Cup
- Stock European Championship
- Women's European Championship

=== National ===
- MotoAmerica (AMA)
  - AMA Superbike Championship
  - AMA Supersport Championship
- British Superbike Championship
  - British Supersport Championship
  - British MotoStar
- American Historic Racing Motorcycle Association
- All Japan Road Race Championship
- Argentinean Superbike Championship
- Australian Superbike Championship
- Brazilian Superbike Championship
- Canadian Superbike Championship
- Czech Superbike Championship
- CIV Superbike (Italian national championship)
- Danish Superbike Championship
- European Supermono UEM Cup
- Euro Moto
- Finnish Superbike Championship
- French national championship
- IDM Superbike (German national championship)
- International Dutch Championship (IDC)
- Duke Road Race Rankings
- Malaysia Superbike Championship
- Moto1000 GP (Brazil)
- Norwegian Superbike Championship
- Polish Superbike Championship
- Russian Superbike Championship
- Slovak Superbike Championship
- Swedish Superbike Championship
- Vintage Motor Cycle Club

=== Endurance and Street Racing ===
- Isle of Man TT (Most prestigious race in Motorcycle Racing)
- International Six Days Enduro
- FIM Endurance World Championship
- FIM Enduro Championship
- FIM Hard Enduro World Championship
- FIM SuperEnduro World Championship
- FIM Supermoto World Championship
- AMA EnduroCross Championship
- European Series Road Racing Championship
- King of the Roads
- North West 200
- Road to Brasil

=== Motorcycle speedway ===
==== International ====
===== FIM Sanctioned =====
- FIM Speedway Grand Prix
- FIM Speedway Under-21 World Championship
- FIM Speedway of Nations Under 21
- FIM SGP3 World Championship
- FIM SGP4 World Championship
- FIM Women's Speedway World Cup
- FIM Women's Speedway Gold Trophy
- FIM Flat Track World Championship
- FIM Long Track World Championship
- FIM Long Track of Nations
- FIM Long Track under 23 World Cup
- Speedway Grand Prix Qualification
- Speedway of Nations
- Speedway Super Prix
- Speedway World Cup

==== National ====
- American Flat Track
- AMA National Speedway Championship
- Argentine Individual Speedway Championship
- Australian Solo Championship
- Australian Under 21 Solo Speedway Championship
- British Speedway Championship
- British Under-19 Championship
- British Speedway Under 21 Championship
- Czech Republic Individual Speedway Championship
- Danish Speedway League
- Danish Under 21 Individual Speedway Championship
- European Pairs Speedway Championship
- European Team Speedway Championship
- European Under-19 Individual Speedway Championship
- European Under-23 Team Speedway Championship
- Individual Speedway Danish Championship
- Individual Speedway European Championship
- Individual Speedway Polish Championship
- National Development League
- National League Knockout Cup
- National League Pairs Championship
- National League Riders' Championship
- New South Wales Individual Speedway Championship
- New Zealand Solo Championship
- Norwegian Individual Speedway Championship
- Polish Junior Individual Speedway Championship
- Queensland Solo Championship
- SGB Championship
- SGB Premiership
- SGB Championship Knockout Cup
- SGB Championship Pairs Championship
- SGB Premiership Pairs Championship
- SGB Championship Riders' Championship
- SGB Premiership Riders' Championship
- South Australian Individual Speedway Championship
- Speedway Swedish Individual Championship
- Swedish Speedway Team Championship
- Swedish Junior Speedway Championship
- Super Grade (Japanese Championship)
- Team Speedway Polish Championship
- Victorian Individual Speedway Championship
- Western Australian Individual Speedway Championship

=== Moto Trials or Land Record ===
- Bonneville Motorcycle Speed Trials AMA National and FIM World Records
- FIM Trial World Championship
- NATC Trials Championship
- Trial des Nations

=== Off-Roading ===
International

- FIM World Rally-Raid Championship
- FIM Bajas World Cup
- FIM Sand Races World Championship

National

- Beach racing
- EnduroCross
- Grand National Cross Country
- NGPC Racing

=== Motocross ===
==== International ====
- FIM Motocross World Championship
- FIM Women's Motocross World Championship
- FIM Motocross Junior World Championship
- Motocross des Nations

==== National ====
- 2-Stroke World MX Championship
- ADAC MX Masters
- All Japan Motocross Championship
- AMA Motocross Championship
- Brazilian Motocross Championship
- British Motocross Championship
- Chile MX Championship
- Dutch Masters of Motocross
- European Motocross Championship
- EMX Women | European Championship
- French Elite Motocross Championship
- Italian Prestige Motocross Championship
- NSW Motocross State Titles
- New Zealand Motocross Championship
- ProMX
- Spanish Motocross Championship
- Triple Crown Series
- Women's Motocross Championship

=== Supercross ===
==== International ====
- FIM Supercross World Championship
- Supermoto of Nations

==== National ====
- AMA Supercross Championship
- SuperMotocross World Championship
- Australian Supercross Championship

=== Freestyle Motocross ===
- FIM FreeStyleCross World Cup
- NIGHT of the JUMPs
- X Games

=== Ice Speedway & Snocross ===
==== International ====
- FIM Ice Speedway World Championship
- FIM Ice Speedway of Nations
- FIM Snowcross World Championship

==== National ====
- AMSOIL Snocross Championship
- Individual Ice Racing European Championship

=== E-Bike ===
- World E-Bike Series

=== SideCar ===
- FIM Sidecar World Championship
- FIM Sidecarcross World Championship
- Australian Sidecar Speedway Championship
- Sidecar TT

=== Quad (ATV) Racing ===
- FIM Quadcross of Nations(Intercontinental)
- GNCC Racing(American)

== Motorboats ==
Boat racing

=== Powerboats ===
- UIM Formula 1 Powerboat World Championship
- UIM F2 World Championship
- UIM Formula 4S Powerboat World Championship
- APBA Gold Cup
- British Powerboat Racing Club
- Circuit Boat Racing Australia
- Circuit Powerboat Association
- E1 Series
- IHRA F1 Powerboat Series

=== Offshore ===
- UIM XCAT Powerboating World Championship
- UIM Class 1 World Powerboat Championship
- UIM V2 World Powerboat Championship
- APBA Offshore National Series
- IHRA Offshore Powerboat Series
- Offshore Powerboat Association Racing
- Offshore Superboat Championships - Australia
- P1 SuperStock
- Race World Offshore
- UK Offshore Powerboat Racing

=== Hydroplane racing ===
- Apollo Mechanical Cup Hydroplane
- H1 Unlimited
- Hydroplane Racing League
- Unlimited Hydroplane Racing
- Michigan Hydroplane Racing Association

=== Aquabikes ===
- Aquabike World Championship
- European Aquabike Continental Championship
- IHRA Professional Watercraft Series

=== Motosurf ===
- Motosurf World Championship

=== Jetsprint ===
- American Sprint Boat Racing
- Australian Formula Jet Sprint Association
- New Zealand Jetsprint Championship
- North American Sprint Boat Association
- West Coast Jetsprint

=== Drag racing ===
- IHRA Drag Boat Racing
- Southern Outlaw Drag Boat Association

== Air racing ==
Air Racing

=== Plane racing ===
- Air Race Classic
- Air Race X
- National Championship Air Races
- Sport Class Air Racing
- Sport Air Racing League

== See also ==
- Demolition Derby
- Horse Racing
- Marathon Racing
- Track Racing
- List of motorsports points scoring systems
- Category:Racing schools
