= 2026 Formula Pro USA Western Championship =

Season of motorsports

The 2026 Formula Pro USA Western Series was the seventh season of the championship for Formula Regional and Formula 4 cars established on the West Coast of the United States. The championship is promoted and organized by Exclusive Racing and Exclusive Auctions, and is run under the same sporting regulations as the FIA-sanctioned Formula Regional Americas Championship and Formula 4 United States Championship.

It began in March, with the championship spanning six weekends until November. Both class championships were decided on the penultimate race weekend: World Speed Motorsports driver Dan Decker won the championship title in the Formula Regional-level FPUSA-3 class after winning the opening six races in a row, while Kiwi Motorsport's Lucas Hand claimed the Formula 4-level FPUSA-4 class title on the same day. World Speed Motorsports claimed the Teams' Championship title in both classes, while Ana Palestro became the Women's Racing Series champion.

== Teams and drivers ==
Drivers were able to enter either the FPUSA-3 or the FPUSA-4 class, with the former using a Ligier JS F3 car and the latter a Ligier JS-F4 car. All cars were powered by Honda and used Avon tires.

Team	No.	Driver	Class	Rounds
Formula Pro USA 3 (FPUSA-3) entries
World Speed Motorsports	3	(United States) Larry Schnur		1–4, 6
World Speed Motorsports	111	(United States) Dan Decker		1–4
Jensen Global Advisors	7	(United States) Jonathan Carette		5
Jensen Global Advisors	11	(United States) Aiden Zelaya		4
Alpha Micron	9	(United States) Jake Bonilla		5
Formula Pro USA 4 (FPUSA-4) entries
Jensen Global Advisors	1	(United States) Andrew Davis		1
Jensen Global Advisors	1	(United States) Zachary Lewis		2–3, 5–6
Jensen Global Advisors	1	(United States) Marco Martin		4
Jensen Global Advisors	2	(United States) Ana Palestro	F	1–3
Jensen Global Advisors	2	(United States) Ari Sethi		5–6
Jensen Global Advisors	5	(United States) Robert Arana		1–3
Jensen Global Advisors	5	(United States) Jeremiah Thomas		4
Jensen Global Advisors	6	(United States) Ryan Spencer		4–5
Jensen Global Advisors	7	(United States) Jeremiah Thomas		3
Jensen Global Advisors	7	(United States) Zachary Lewis		4
Jensen Global Advisors	8	(United States) Jonathan Carette		4
Kiwi Motorsport	109	(United States) Will Franklin		1
Kiwi Motorsport	123	(United States) Mauricio Robbins		All
Kiwi Motorsport	124	(United States) Chloe Jade	F	All
Kiwi Motorsport	177	(United States) Ana Palestro	F	4–6
Kiwi Motorsport	191	(Canada) Lucas Hand		All
Kiwi Motorsport	888	(United States) Narcisse Triano	F	2, 4
World Speed Motorsports	114	(United States) Erik Doan		All
World Speed Motorsports	115	(United States) Scott Pyle		1–3, 5–6
World Speed Motorsports	116	(United States) Yana Kapoor	F	All
World Speed Motorsports	117	(United States) Austin Tiller		All

Icon	Status
F	Female driver entered in the Women's Racing Series class

== Race calendar ==
The 2026 calendar was once again held over twelve races spanning across six weekends. The series did not return to Buttonwillow Raceway Park, instead replacing it by a third round at Sonoma Raceway.

Round		Circuit	Date	Support bill	Map of circuit locations
1	R1	Sonoma Raceway, Sonoma	March 7	NASA Northwest & Northern California Region; Formula Car Challenge	2026 Formula Pro USA Western Championship is located in California
1	R2	Sonoma Raceway, Sonoma	March 8	NASA Northwest & Northern California Region; Formula Car Challenge	2026 Formula Pro USA Western Championship is located in California
2	R3	Sonoma Raceway, Sonoma	April 25	SVRA Sprint Series; Trans-Am Series	2026 Formula Pro USA Western Championship is located in California
2	R4	Sonoma Raceway, Sonoma	April 26	SVRA Sprint Series; Trans-Am Series	2026 Formula Pro USA Western Championship is located in California
3	R5	Thunderhill Raceway Park, Willows	May 16	San Francisco Region SCCA Series; Formula Car Challenge	2026 Formula Pro USA Western Championship is located in California
3	R6	Thunderhill Raceway Park, Willows	May 17	San Francisco Region SCCA Series; Formula Car Challenge	2026 Formula Pro USA Western Championship is located in California
4	R7	WeatherTech Raceway Laguna Seca, Monterey	June 27	San Francisco Region SCCA Series; Formula Car Challenge	2026 Formula Pro USA Western Championship is located in California
4	R8	WeatherTech Raceway Laguna Seca, Monterey	June 28	San Francisco Region SCCA Series; Formula Car Challenge	2026 Formula Pro USA Western Championship is located in California
5	R9	WeatherTech Raceway Laguna Seca, Monterey	October 3	SVRA Sprint Series; Porsche GT3 Cup Trophy USA	2026 Formula Pro USA Western Championship is located in California
5	R10	WeatherTech Raceway Laguna Seca, Monterey	October 4	SVRA Sprint Series; Porsche GT3 Cup Trophy USA	2026 Formula Pro USA Western Championship is located in California
6	R11	Sonoma Raceway, Sonoma	November 7	NASA Northwest & Northern California Region	2026 Formula Pro USA Western Championship is located in California
6	R12	Sonoma Raceway, Sonoma	November 8	NASA Northwest & Northern California Region	2026 Formula Pro USA Western Championship is located in California

== Race results ==
Round		Circuit	Pole position	FPUSA-3		FPUSA-4		FPUSA-WRS
Round		Circuit	Pole position	Fastest lap	Winning driver	Fastest lap	Winning driver	Winning driver
1	R1	Sonoma Raceway	(United States) Dan Decker	(United States) Dan Decker	(United States) Dan Decker	(Canada) Lucas Hand	(Canada) Lucas Hand	(United States) Yana Kapoor
1	R2	Sonoma Raceway	(United States) Dan Decker	(United States) Dan Decker	(United States) Dan Decker	(Canada) Lucas Hand	(Canada) Lucas Hand	(United States) Yana Kapoor
2	R3	Sonoma Raceway	(United States) Larry Schnur	(United States) Dan Decker	(United States) Dan Decker	(United States) Erik Doan	(Canada) Lucas Hand	(United States) Ana Palestro
2	R4	Sonoma Raceway	(United States) Dan Decker	(United States) Dan Decker	(United States) Dan Decker	(United States) Mauricio Robbins	(United States) Scott Pyle	(United States) Ana Palestro
3	R5	Thunderhill Raceway Park	(United States) Dan Decker	(United States) Dan Decker	(United States) Dan Decker	(United States) Erik Doan	(United States) Erik Doan	(United States) Yana Kapoor
3	R6	Thunderhill Raceway Park	(United States) Dan Decker	(United States) Dan Decker	(United States) Dan Decker	(United States) Erik Doan	(United States) Erik Doan	(United States) Yana Kapoor
4	R7	WeatherTech Raceway Laguna Seca	(Canada) Lucas Hand	(United States) Aiden Zelaya	(United States) Aiden Zelaya	(Canada) Lucas Hand	(United States) Zachary Lewis	(United States) Ana Palestro
4	R8	WeatherTech Raceway Laguna Seca	(Canada) Lucas Hand	(United States) Aiden Zelaya	(United States) Aiden Zelaya	(Canada) Lucas Hand	(Canada) Lucas Hand	(United States) Yana Kapoor
5	R9	WeatherTech Raceway Laguna Seca	(United States) Jake Bonilla	(United States) Jake Bonilla	(United States) Jake Bonilla	(Canada) Lucas Hand	(Canada) Lucas Hand	(United States) Ana Palestro
5	R10	WeatherTech Raceway Laguna Seca	(United States) Jake Bonilla	(United States) Jake Bonilla	(United States) Jake Bonilla	(United States) Erik Doan	(Canada) Lucas Hand	(United States) Ana Palestro
6	R11	Sonoma Raceway	(United States) Larry Schnur	(United States) Larry Schnur	(United States) Larry Schnur	(Canada) Lucas Hand	(United States) Erik Doan	(United States) Ana Palestro
6	R12	Sonoma Raceway	(Canada) Lucas Hand	(United States) Larry Schnur	(United States) Larry Schnur	(Canada) Lucas Hand	(Canada) Lucas Hand	(United States) Ana Palestro

== Season report ==
The 2026 season of the Formula Pro USA Western Championship began with two weekends at Sonoma Raceway. The first one saw two entrants in the FPUSA-3 class, with Dan Decker sweeping the weekend ahead of his World Speed Motorsports teammate Larry Schnur by claiming pole position, fastest lap and the win in both races. Eleven cars entered the FPUSA-4 class, but Kiwi Motorsport's Lucas Hand showed similar levels of dominance by also claiming maximum points. His teammate Will Franklin took second on the road in both races, but was later excluded, handing WSM's Erik Doan two second places. Yana Kapoor, also driving for WSM, beat her two opponents in FPUSA-WRS in both races.

Decker continued his dominance in the FPUSA-3 class throughout the second weekend by claiming two more race wins to grow his lead over his sole competitor Schnur to 36 points. The FPUSA-4 class proved far more competitive, as Hand and Doan battled closely throughout the weekend. Hand claimed pole position and narrowly won the opening race after beating Doan by just 0.011 seconds in a final-lap fight. Doan came back to beat him in race two, before post-race penalties saw both drop outside the podium spots as WSM's Scott Pyle inherited victory instead. Hand held on to a 19-point lead in the standings as Jensen's Ana Palestro moved into the FPUSA-WRS lead after winning both races.

Thunderhill Raceway Park hosted round three, and the competitive picture in FPUSA-3 remained the same as Decker took two more pole positions, two more fastest laps and two more race wins, maintaining his maximum points streak and growing his lead over Schnur yet again. FPUSA-4 saw the resumption of the title battle between Hand and Doan, although this time Doan came out on top. He led every lap of both races as Hand took second place both times. That saw him hold on to the championship lead by a single point. Pyle and Kiwi's Mauricio Robbins shared third places in class as Kapoor retook the lead of the FPUSA-WRS standings by taking seventh and eighth overall in the two races.

The season's second half began at WeatherTech Raceway Laguna Seca, where FPUSA-3 regulars Decker and Schnur were both absent, allowing Jensen's Aiden Zelaya to sweep both races in the class. In FPUSA-4, contact between points leaders Hand and Doan while battling for the lead in the opening race saw the latter drop to eleventh. Jensen's Zachary Lewis took his first win as Hand was able to recover to second ahead of Tiller. Hand followed that up with a rise from fifth on the race two grid to victory, passing Doan on the road to extend his championship lead to 30 points. In FPUSA-WRS, Palestro and Kapoor shared class wins, leaving Kapoor ahead in the WRS class standings by 31 points to 29.

The penultimate weekend of the year saw the series return to Laguna Seca after a three-month break. In FPUSA-3, only two drivers entered and Kiwi Motorsport's Jake Bonilla led Jensen's Jonathan Carette in both races. With early championship protagonists Decker and Schnur still absent, Decker secured the class title. In FPUSA-4, Hand led an eleven-car field as he added two more victories to his tally: He beat Lewis and Pyle in the first race before finishing ahead of Doan and Robbins in the second race. With Doan now 50 points behind, Hand clinched the class title with a round to spare. Palestro won both FPUSA-WRS races ahead of Kapoor to also overtake her by two points in the WRS standings.

== Championship standings ==
Points were awarded as follows:

Position	**1st**	**2nd**	**3rd**	**4th**	**5th**	**6th**	**7th**	**8th**	**9th**	**10th**	**FL**
Points	25	18	15	12	10	8	6	4	2	1	2

Each driver's two worst results were dropped.

=== Drivers' standings ===
Pos	Driver	SON1		SON2		THU		LAG1		LAG2		SON3		Pts
Pos	Driver	R1	R2	R3	R4	R5	R6	R7	R8	R9	R10	R11	R12	Pts
Formula Pro USA 3 (FPUSA-3)
1	(United States) Dan Decker	**1**	**1**	1	**1**	**1**	**1**	DNS	DNS					162
2	(United States) Larry Schnur	2	2	**2**†	2	2	2	DNS	DNS			**1**	1	162
3	(United States) Jake Bonilla									**1**	**1**			54
4	(United States) Aiden Zelaya							1	1					54
5	(United States) Jonathan Carette									2	2			36
Formula Pro USA 4 (FPUSA-4)
1	(Canada) Lucas Hand	1	1	1	(7)	2	2	**2**	**1**	1	1	(10†)	**1**	241
2	(United States) Erik Doan	2	2	2	(5)	1	1	(11†)	2	4	2	1	2	203
3	(United States) Zachary Lewis			7	4	5	5†	1	3	2	4	4	3	135
4	(United States) Scott Pyle	3	6†	4	1	3	7†	(DNS)	(DNS)	3	11	2	5	124
5	(United States) Mauricio Robbins	(10†)	7	3	5	4	3†	5	4	11†	3	3	4	122
6	(United States) Austin Tiller	4	3	6	3	(11†)	4†	3	5	5	5	6†	(7)	115
7	(United States) Ana Palestro **F**	8†	9	8	8	8	(10†)	6	(9)	6	6	5	6	60
8	(United States) Robert Arana Jr.	5†	4	5	2	10†	6†	DNS	DNS					59
9	(United States) Yana Kapoor **F**	7†	8	(9)	(10)	7	8†	8	8	7	7	7†	8	50
10	(United States) Jonathan Carette							4	6					20
11	(United States) Andrew Davis	6†	5†											18
12	(United States) Chloe Jade **F**	9†	10	(11)	9	9	9†	10	(11)	9	9	9	10	17
13	(United States) Jeremiah Thomas					6	11†	DNS	7					14
14	(United States) Ryan Spencer							7	12	8	8			14
15	(United States) Ari Sethi									10	10	8	9	8
16	(United States) Narcisse Triano **F**			10	11			9	10					4
—	(United States) Marco Martin							DNS	DNS					0
—	(United States) Will Franklin	EX	EX											0
Pos	Driver	R1	R2	R3	R4	R5	R6	R7	R8	R9	R10	R11	R12	Pts
Pos	Driver	SON1		SON2		THU		LAG1		LAG2		SON3		Pts

Colour	Result
Gold	Winner
Silver	Second place
Bronze	Third place
Green	Points classification
Blue	Non-points classification
Blue	Non-classified finish (NC)
Purple	Retired, not classified (Ret)
Red	Did not qualify (DNQ)
Red	Did not pre-qualify (DNPQ)
Black	Disqualified (DSQ)
White	Did not start (DNS)
White	Withdrew (WD)
White	Race cancelled (C)
Blank	Did not practice (DNP)
Blank	Did not arrive (DNA)
Blank	Excluded (EX)

**Bold** – Pole

Italics – Fastest Lap

=== Teams' standings ===
Each team counted the results of their best two finishing cars.

Pos	Driver	SON1		SON2		THU		LAG1		LAG2		SON3		Pts
Pos	Driver	R1	R2	R3	R4	R5	R6	R7	R8	R9	R10	R11	R12	Pts
Formula Pro USA 3 (FPUSA-3)
1	World Speed Motorsports	1	1	1	1	1	1	DNS	DNS			1	1	324
1	World Speed Motorsports	2	2	2†	2	2	2	DNS	DNS					324
2	Jensen Global Advisors							1	1	2	2			90
3	Kiwi Motorsport									1	1			54
Formula Pro USA 4 (FPUSA-4)
1	World Speed Motorsports	2	2	2	1	1	1	3	2	3	2	1	2	394
1	World Speed Motorsports	3	3	4	3	3	4†	8	5	4	5	2	5	394
2	Kiwi Motorsport	1	1	1	6	2	2	2	1	1	1	3	1	389
2	Kiwi Motorsport	9†	7	3	7	4	3†	5	4	6	3	5†	4	389
3	Jensen Global Advisors	5†	4	5	2	5	5†	1	3	2	4	4	3	253
3	Jensen Global Advisors	6†	5†	7	4	6	6†	4	6	8	8	8	9	253
Pos	Driver	R1	R2	R3	R4	R5	R6	R7	R8	R9	R10	R11	R12	Pts
Pos	Driver	SON1		SON2		THU		LAG1		LAG2		SON3		Pts
