= Gridlife (festival) =

Motorsport festivals organiser

GRIDLIFE is a motorsports sanctioning body that hosts a series of music and motorsports festivals at racetracks across the United States. Racetrack venues that currently host Gridlife festivals include Carolina Motorsports Park, Watkins Glen International, GingerMan Raceway, Mid-Ohio Sports Car Course, Lime Rock Park, and WeatherTech Raceway Laguna Seca. Non-festival events are held at Autobahn Country Club, Road America, Heartland Motorsports Park, New Jersey Motorsports Park & more. GRIDLIFE events feature daytime events such as road racing, time attack, drifting, car shows and concerts with contemporary EDM, Hip Hop and Alternative music in the evenings.

GRIDLIFE Festivals started as HPDE events, but in recent years have shifted focus to time Attack and drifting as a part of its on track activities, in addition to its wheel-to-wheel racing series, GRIDLIFE Touring Cup (GLTC). GRIDLIFE regularly features pro Formula Drift drivers.

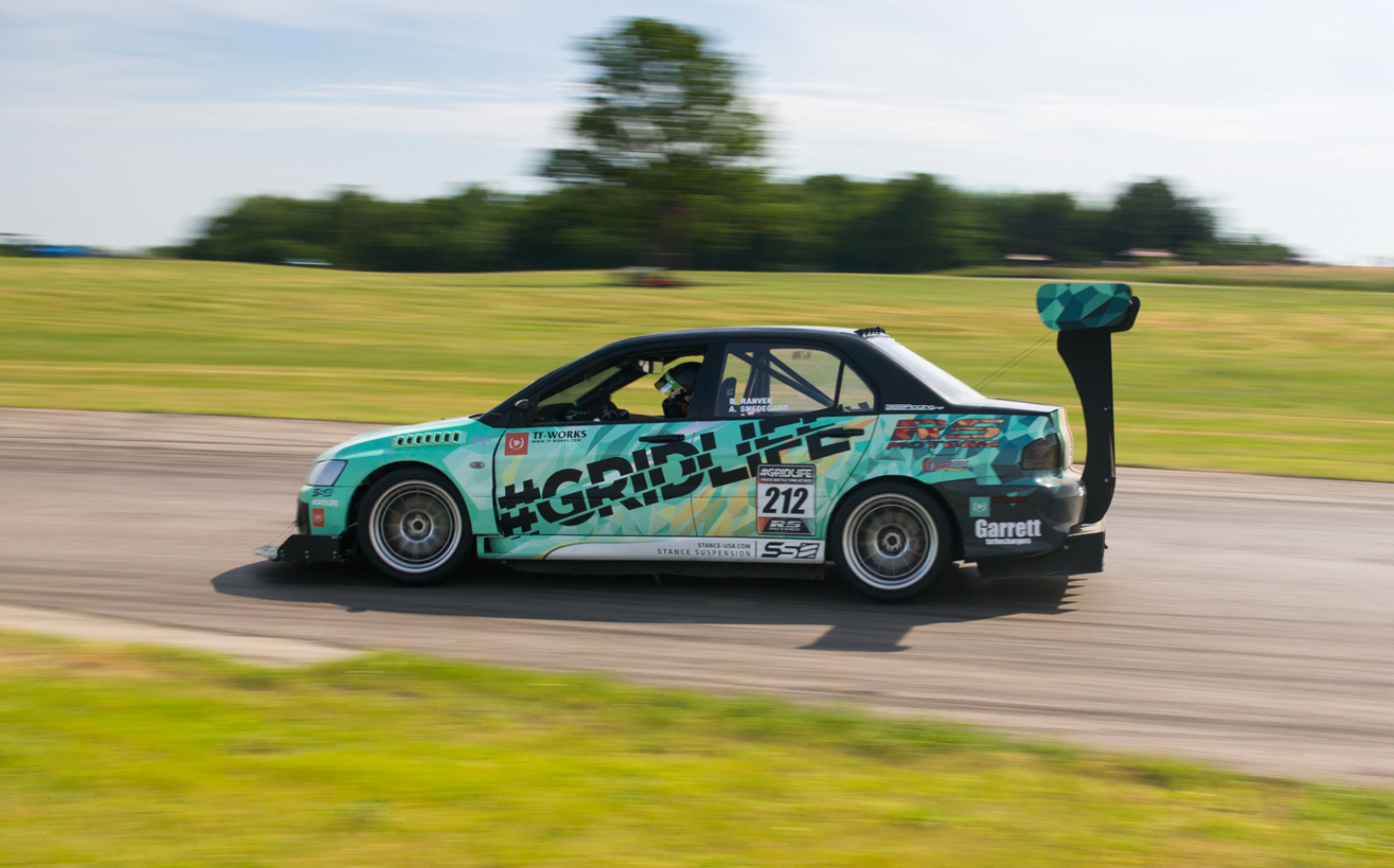
Andy Smedegard driving his RS Motors Time Attack Mitsubishi Evo IX at Gingerman Raceway, South Haven, Michigan in 2017.

== History ==
=== 2013 ===
GRIDLIFE was founded in 2013 with its first event taking place in May 2014 at Gingerman Raceway. The 2014 edition saw an attendance of over 1500 spectators with 220 drivers in HPDE and Time Attack and a field of 30 drift drivers throughout the weekend. Music lineup for 2014 featured headliners WillyJoy, The Hood Internet and surprise set from Autobot of Flosstradamus.

=== 2015 ===
GRIDLIFE saw significant growth in 2015 with nearly 4000 attendees and over 300 Drivers on Track for HPDE. The time attack portion of GRIDLIFE was renamed to TrackBattle and featured a large entry field of over 80 cars. Music lineup featured an increased production and headliners RJD2, Keys N Krates, Party Favor, and Pretty Lights Music artist Paul Basic.

=== 2019 ===
New for 2019 was the introduction of GRIDLIFE's new wheel-to-wheel racing series, GRIDLIFE Touring Cup (GLTC). The new series ran five races at the opening round of the season at Mid-Ohio Sports Car Course. 2019 was the final year of the GRIDLIFE South Festival at Michelin Raceway Road Atlanta.

=== 2020 ===
The arrival of the global COVID-19 pandemic in the United States stopped public gatherings at motorsports events while plans were made to continue operations. Because of its outdoor nature, GRIDLIFE was able to continue operations with social distancing and the competition season was largely unaffected. However, the popular Midwest Festival moved to October to allow more response time to the pandemic. This October date remained until 2022, when it was moved back to its traditional June weekend.

=== 2023 ===
GRIDLIFE announced in the fall of 2022 that its 2023 season would feature large shifts to its schedule planning strategy, splitting its 10-15 annual event season into six Festival Tour events, with the remainder of the schedule transitioning to a Club Weekend format that would feature more track time for its participants in HPDE and the NOS Energy TrackBattle Championship. GRIDLIFE Touring Cup was only to be featured at the live broadcast rounds on the Festival Tour.

== Motorsports ==
=== Wheel-to-Wheel Racing: GRIDLIFE Touring Cup ===
GRIDLIFE created its GRIDLIFE Touring Cup (GLTC) wheel-to-wheel racing series in 2019, organized by Motorsports Director Adam Jabaay. The intention of the series was to create a spectator-focused racing series designed around a simple set of rules governing vehicle power, weight, and tire width, in short, single-class, sprint races run multiple times in an event weekend.

A core principal in GRIDLIFE Touring Cup is the idea of "race for the racing, not for the result", with staff heavily emphasizing respect on and off the racetrack, with a low tolerance for car-to-car contact, blocking, dive-bombs, or other unsportsmanlike conduct. The importance of this concept is stressed at every GRIDLIFE event, resulting in low incident rates. Races are designed to be run in 12-15 minutes, four times a weekend, with points accumulated in each race and summed for the weekend championship. Drivers can accumulate these points over several events in a season and compete for a season title. As of 2023, the championship is decided by totaling a driver's best five rounds (out of eight points-scoring events). GRIDLIFE Touring Cup typically runs with field sizes between 30 and 60 cars, depending on the size of the venue. Common vehicles include the Chevrolet Corvette, Honda S2000, Mazda MX-5 Miata, Honda Civic, and BMW M3. Competitors build cars for GLTC by selecting a chassis, weighing the car, placing the car on a dyno, and then selecting a series of modifiers that add or remove weight to the vehicle's competition weight. For example, adding a rear wing of a particular surface area will add a +3% adjustment to a vehicle's competition weight, while a lack of an operational Anti-Lock Braking System (ABS) is a -2% adjustment. After the modifiers have been totaled, the vehicle will fall into a section of a table determining the allowed tire width for the car, based on its horsepower and competition weight. Most vehicles in GLTC weigh from 2300 lbs to 3400 lbs and make between 190 and 260 wheel horsepower.

The GRIDLIFE Touring Cup schedule follows the GRIDLIFE Festival Tour, with two additional special events for 2023 - the season opener at Circuit of the Americas in conjunction with Super Lap Battle, and at Road America in support of the NASCAR Xfinity Series.

=== NOS Energy TrackBattle Time Attack ===
GRIDLIFE Time Attack is the longest-running form of competition in GRIDLIFE, starting in 2014. Time Attack is a driving competition where the goal is to be the fastest car and driver in one of several vehicle classes. GRIDLIFE's Time Attack series, called the NOS Energy TrackBattle Championship, features eight vehicle classes, though only seven are regularly attended.

==== Competition format ====
The NOS Energy TrackBattle Championship has two event formats, one used in the GRIDLIFE Festival Tour, and one used at GRIDLIFE Club Weekends. Both formats share the same points format, meaning drivers can accumulate season points at either style of event. Championships are determined by the summation of a driver's best four weekend points totals.

===== TrackBattle Classic =====
The TrackBattle Classic format is the style used from 2014 to 2022. Drivers go out on track in a mixed-class environment in groups A-D (where A is the fastest group of cars, D is the slowest). Drivers have 6-8 sessions on track throughout a two-day event. Class results are set by each driver's fastest lap, run in any of the on-track sessions.

===== Podium Sprint =====
The Podium Sprint format is used at GRIDLIFE Festival Tour events. This format is designed to provide a more entertaining experience for spectators both at the track and on GRIDLIFE's live broadcasts. It consists of two 20-minute practice sessions, where drivers go on track in large groups organized by their pace. These sessions are just for car shakedowns and for drivers to learn the course. Next are three qualifying sessions, where drivers go on track only with cars from their competition class. Drivers compete with their laptimes in each of these sessions. After all three qualifying sessions, the fastest five drivers from each class advance to the Podium Sprint. Each driver, running slowest to fastest from qualifying, runs two flying, solo laps to set their weekend result. The fastest lap in this session is the winner for each class. Drivers that do not qualify for the Podium Sprint are classified by their best qualifying time; these drivers get one additional session on the last day of the weekend to improve this time if they choose. Points are awarded on a 25-point scale from Fastest to 19th place in class.

==== Competition Classes ====
Class	Summary	Common Vehicles	Production Based	Street Legality Required
Falken Sundae Cup	25:1 Power-to-Weight, for Front-Drive Economy Cars	Honda Fit, Ford Fiesta, Mazda 2	Yes	No
Falken Club TR	Lightweight enthusiast vehicles, engine swaps allowed, no internal engine modifications	Honda S2000, Toyota GR86, Subaru BRZ, Honda Civic	Yes	No
Street	Bolt-on modifications, restricted turbo size	Subaru WRX Sti, Mitsubishi Evolution, Tesla Model 3	Yes	Yes
Street GT	Large displacement cars with minimal modifications	Chevrolet Corvette, Chevrolet Camaro, Toyota GR Supra, Ford Mustang	Yes	Yes
Street Modified	Heavily modified street cars, aero components allowed	Chevrolet Corvette, Toyota GR Supra, Mercedes AMG, Subaru WRX STi	Yes	Yes
Track Modern	Modern supercars with minimal mods OR heavily modified, track only builds	Porsche 911, McLaren 720S, Tesla Model 3, Chevrolet Corvette	Yes	No
Unlimited	Production based cars with rules only for safety requirements	Chevrolet Corvette, Audi RS3, Ford GT500, BMW M3	Yes	No
SuperUnlimited	Any closed-wheel or open-wheel purpose built race car	NASCAR stock car, FIA GT3/GT4, Trans-Am GT1 or similar	No	No

== Drift ==
GRIDLIFE events include non-competitive drifting as part of its spectator-focused on track programming. Some events, like GRIDLIFE's annual Midwest Festival at GingerMan Raceway, feature drivers from Formula Drift such as Vaughn Gittin, Jr., Chelsea DeNofa, Chris Forsberg, Ryan Tuerck, Matt Field, and more. Some drivers bring their Formula D builds, while others build or bring cars just for GRIDLIFE Drift. The non-competitive nature of the action provides a lighthearted and entertaining atmosphere as drivers can focus on entertaining spectators rather than focusing on the heat of competition.

== Schedule ==
=== Festival Tour ===
Festival Tour events feature GRIDLIFE Touring Cup (GLTC), NOS Energy TrackBattle Time Attack, Drift, HPDE, a Car Concours, and occasionally music (South Carolina, Midwest Festival, GRIDLIFE Laguna) and are designed to be spectator-focused events. Festival Tour events are broadcast live to GRIDLIFE YouTube, Twitch, and Facebook channels.

Event name	Circuit	Date
GRIDLIFE South Carolina	Carolina Motorsports Park	30 Mar 2023 - 02 Apr 2023
GRIDLIFE at The Glen	Watkins Glen International	28 Apr 2023 - 30 Apr 2023
GRIDLIFE Midwest Festival	GingerMan Raceway	02 Jun 2023 - 04 Jun 2023
GRIDLIFE Elkhart Special	Road America	27 Jul 2023 - 29 Jul 2023
GRIDLIFE Mid-Ohio Meet	Mid-Ohio Sports Car Course	04 Aug 2023 - 06 Aug 2023
GRIDLIFE Circuit Legends	Lime Rock Park	18 Aug 2023 - 20 Aug 2023
GRIDLIFE Laguna	WeatherTech Raceway Laguna Seca	20 Oct 2023 - 22 Oct 2023

=== Club Weekends ===
Club Weekends feature the NOS Energy TrackBattle Championship, HPDE, and occasionally Drift. These events are driver-focused with an emphasis on track-time per dollar. In contrast to the Festival Tour events, these events are priced lower and include less for spectators to see and do at the event. These events are not livestreamed.

Event name	Circuit	Date
GRIDLIFE COTA Special	Circuit of the Americas	11 Mar 2023 - 12 Mar 2023
GRIDLIFE Midwest Rev-Up	GingerMan Raceway	20 May 2023 - 21 May 2023
GRIDLIFE Chicago	Autobahn Country Club	24 Jun 2023 - 25 June 2023
GRIDLIFE New Jersey	New Jersey Motorsports Park	22 Jul 2023 - 23 Jul 2023
GRIDLIFE Heartland	Heartland Motorsports Park	23 Sep 2023 - 24 Sep 2023
GRIDLIFE Streets Special	Willow Springs International Raceway	30 Sep 2023 - 01 Oct 2023

=== Former events ===
GRIDLIFE continues to explore venues around the country to host both Festival Tour events and Club Weekends. Venues at which GRIDLIFE has hosted events, but are not currently on the schedule, include:

- Michelin Raceway Road Atlanta
- Blackhawk Farms Raceway
- Pikes Peak International Raceway
- NOLA Motorsports Park
- NCM Motorsports Park
- Atlanta Motorsports Park

== Live Broadcast ==
GRIDLIFE Festival Tour events are broadcast live to the GRIDLIFE YouTube, Twitch, and Facebook channels, featuring TV-like production with live commentary, supporting on-screen graphics, operated trackside cameras, and aerial coverage provided by drones. Notable guest announcers providing commentary for GRIDLIFE Touring Cup (GLTC), the NOS Energy TrackBattle Championship, and Drift, include Greg Creamer, longtime announcer of SPEED World Challenge, GT World Challenge America and Ferrari Challenge, and Jarod DeAnda, announcer of Formula D and Nitro Rallycross.

== Music ==
A core piece of GRIDLIFE's Festival events includes a large-scale music festival, featuring popular artists from the EDM, hip-hop, and alternative genres.

== Media Coverage ==
- RACER Magazine 2023 Coverage
- Grassroots Motorsports 2023 Coverage
- RACER Magazine 2022 Coverage
- Super Street 2015 Coverage
- Speed Academy 2015 Coverage
- Jalopnik 2015 Coverage
- S3 Magazine 2015 Coverage
- Ironwrks 2015 Coverage
- Build Race Party 2015 Coverage
- Build Race Party 2016 Coverage
