= Gingerman Raceway =

Racing course in South Haven, Michigan

Coordinates: 42°24′31″N 86°8′17″W

GingerMan Raceway
- Location: South Haven, Michigan, USA
- Owner: Dan Schnitta
- Operator: GingerMan Raceway, Ltd
- Broke ground: 1995
- Opened: 1996
- Architect: Alan Wilson

Road course
- Surface: Asphalt
- Length: 2.14 mi (3.44 km)
- Turns: 11
- Race lap record: 1:24.949 (Tyler Thielmann, 2015, Formula 1000)

GingerMan Raceway is a road racing course located east of the town of South Haven in southwest Michigan, United States.

The track was built in 1995 and opened for its first full season of racing sports cars and motorcycles in 1996. The track is 2.14 miles long and sits on 330 acres.

The Gridlife festival has been held at the venue since 2014.

== Track Layout ==
The track is the recipient of the Safe Track Award from Victory Lane Magazine, and was designed by architect Alan Wilson for use as a club racing course with clear runoffs and wide, smooth paving to avoid costly vehicle damage, especially for newer drivers.

The 1.88 mi (3.03 km) road course is specifically designed for driver safety, especially for amateur drivers. The circuit update during the 2009 - 2010 off season included an addition to Turn 10 (now 10A) of 1,770 feet of pavement, bringing the course to 2.21 miles. Safety runoff areas were configured to allow counter-race operation. Spectators can watch the races from numerous areas.

Experienced racers and track day drivers consider GingerMan one of the safest road race tracks in the region.
