= Alan Wilson (motorsport) =

South African racing track designer

- Born: May 9, 1946 (age 80); Durban
- Occupations: Engineer, Architect

Alan L. Wilson (born 9 May 1946 in Durban, South Africa) is a South African designer of road course race tracks.

Considered one of the most prolific track designers, Wilson has designed and built more than 20 race courses, including Autobahn Country Club, Miller Motorsports Park, Calabogie Motorsports Park, Barber Motorsports Park, Motorsports Park Hastings, Ningbo International Circuit, Gingerman Raceway, and Pittsburgh International Race Complex, as well as overseeing the 2000-2001 redesign of Circuit Mont-Tremblant. Wilson specializes in designing courses that have wide run-off areas and few obstacles to hit, making them safe for novice drivers participating in track days with street cars.

Wilson has also played major roles in a number of motorsports venues, including serving as the Director of the Sports Car Club of America's Pro Racing series between 2000 and 2004 and Chief Steward for CART in 1985. In 1982, his work as chairman of the Brands Hatch racing club (1978–1982) was honored by the Formula One Constructors' Association for orchestrating the best organized Formula One Grand Prix that year.

In 1975, Wilson married Desiré Wilson, one of only five women to compete in the Formula One World Championship series and the only woman to win a race in the British F1 series. The couple do not have any children.
