= Motorsport Park Hastings =

Road course in Hastings, NE, US

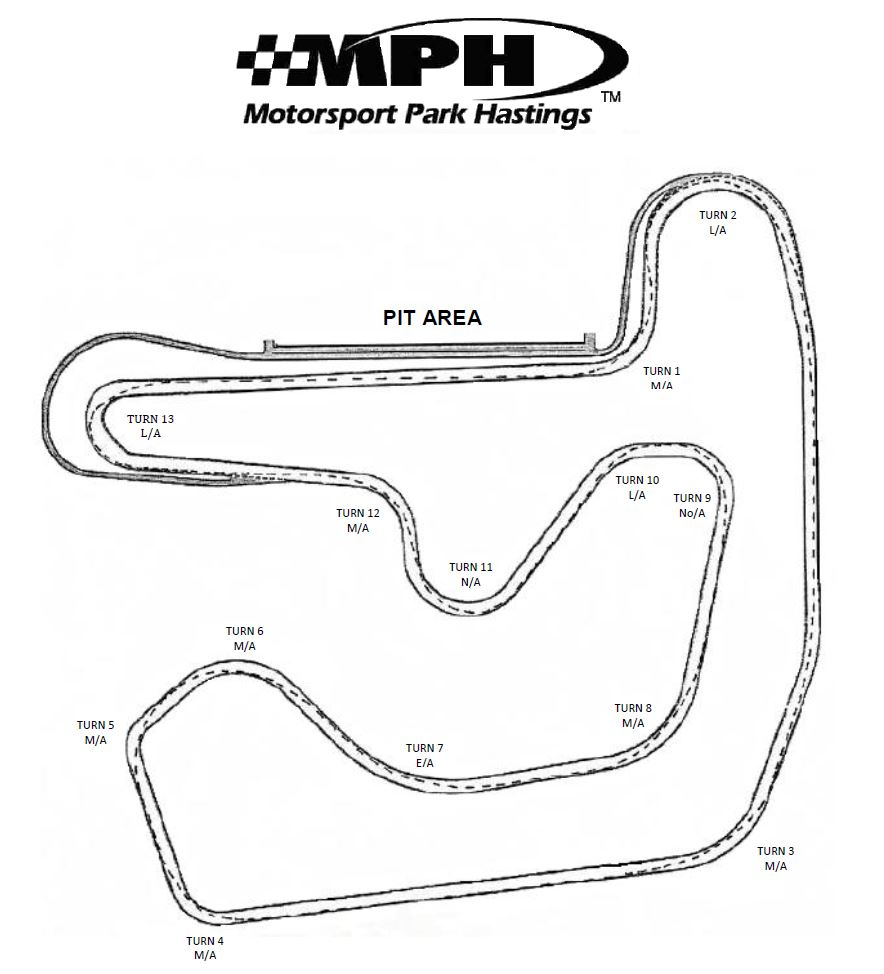
- Location: Hastings, Nebraska, USA
- Coordinates: 40°34′43″N 98°21′11″W
- Broke ground: Early 2006
- Opened: Late 2006
- Architect: Alan Wilson
- Website: http://www.racemph.com//

Road course
- Surface: Asphalt
- Length: 2.15 miles (3.46 km)
- Turns: 13

Motorsport Park Hastings is a 2.15 mile long, 40 foot wide road course on the Southeast corner of Hastings, Nebraska. What started out as a dream on a napkin in a local restaurant with Robert Hartman (Silicon Valley technology entrepreneur), George Anderson (renown engine builder and race car enthusiast) and a few friends, finally became a reality in 2006 when Robert Hartman assisted Hastings Nebraska with a vision to create an SCCA approved road race track course with raising capital, approaching a land owner to contribute/sell 200 acres of cornfields and engage and hire renowned track designer Alan Wilson to design this road course and solicit local developers to provide race car garages circling the track in the plan. Construction started in the early spring of 2006 and by fall most of the asphalt were laid, 13 turns as well as 3 long straight-a-ways that allow for speeds of over 100 mph while providing a safe environment with long run-off areas.

The track host various car/motorcycle clubs and events including:

- ChampCar Endurance Series
- Ducati Omaha/TrackAddix riding school
- Great Plains Regions Porsche Club of America
- KART MARRS
- Mustang Roundup
- Nebraska Region SCCA
- NASA Mid-America Region
- Rocky Mountain Vintage Racing
- Viper Rendezvous

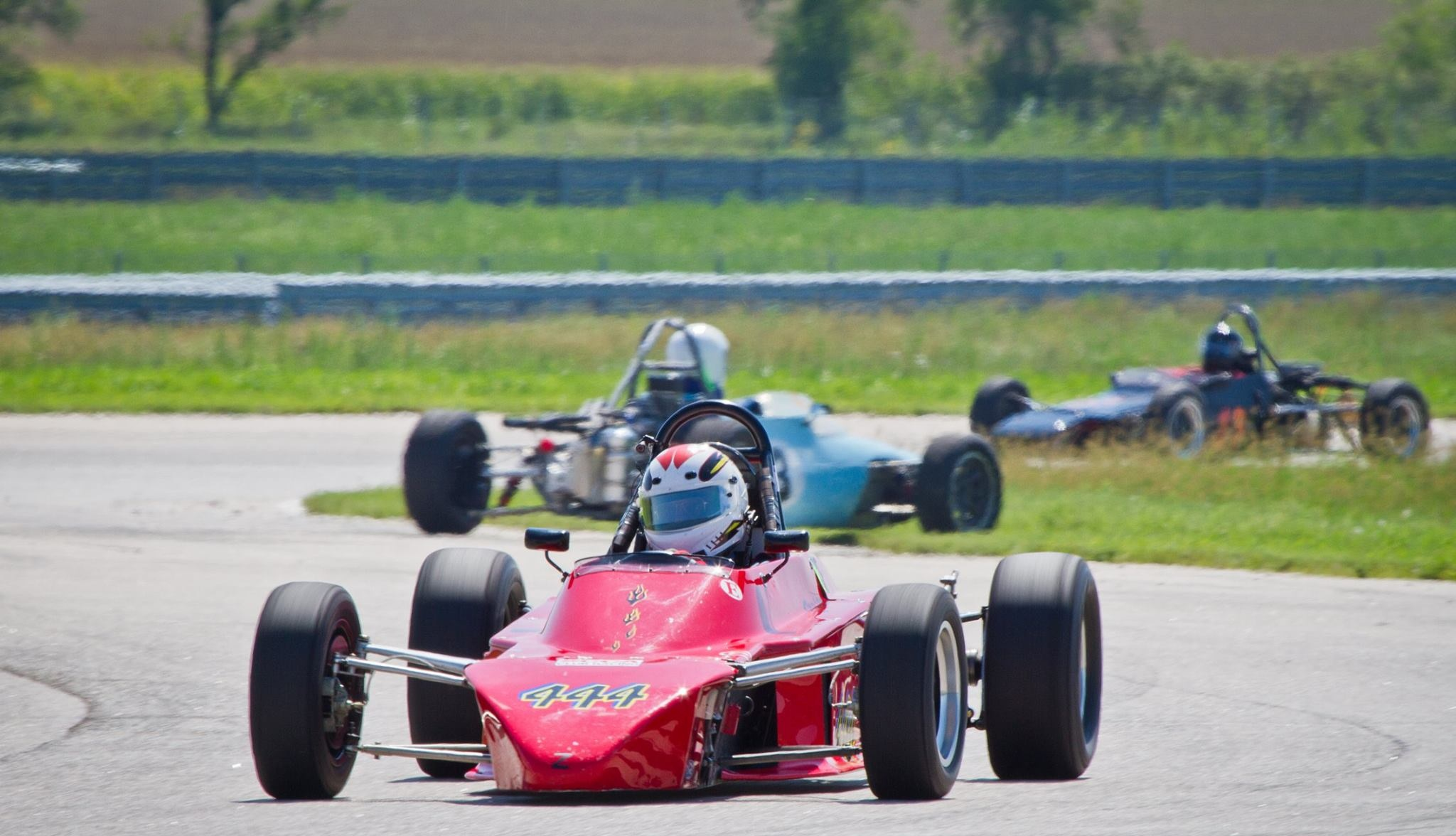
Formula Vee

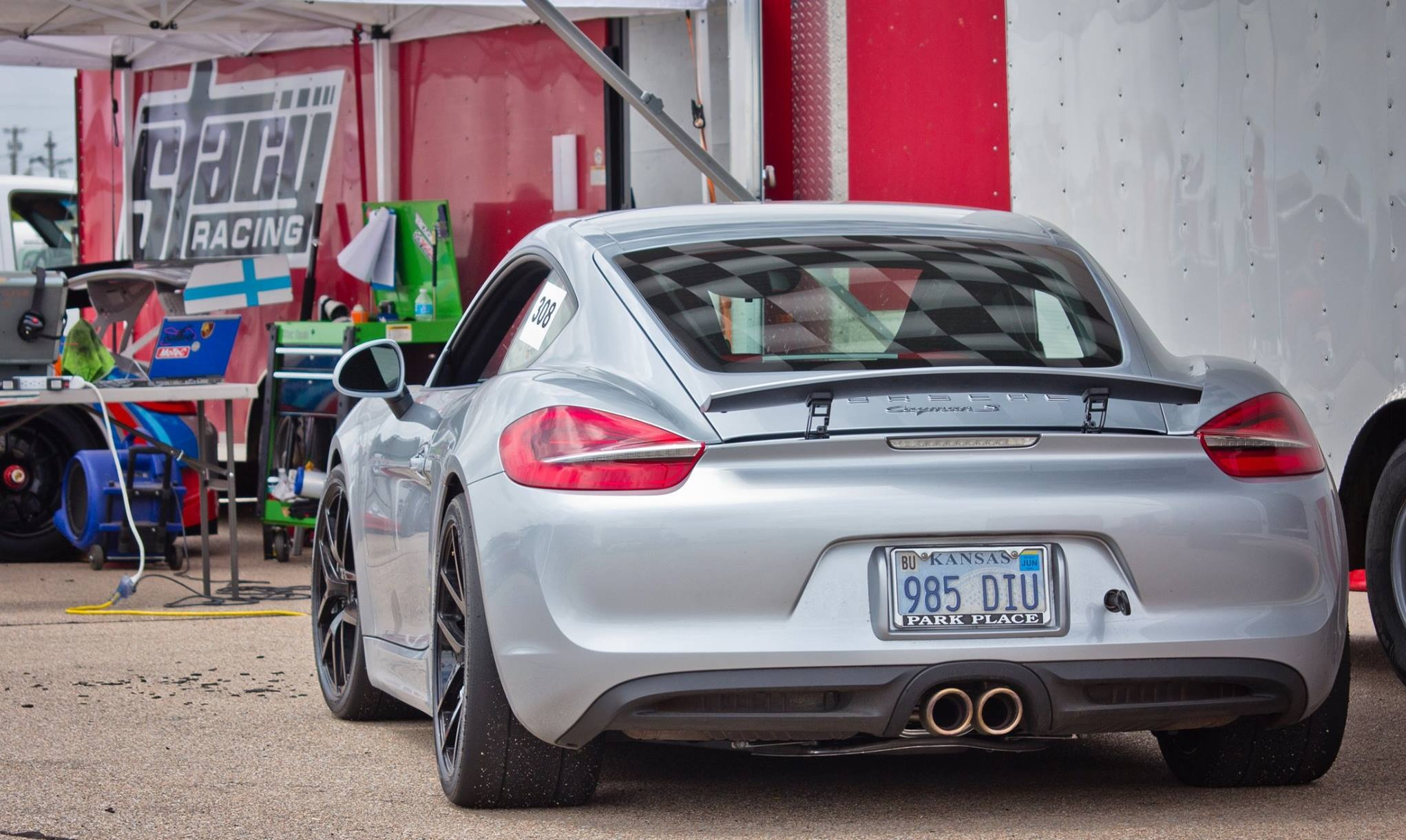
Porsche Cayman S

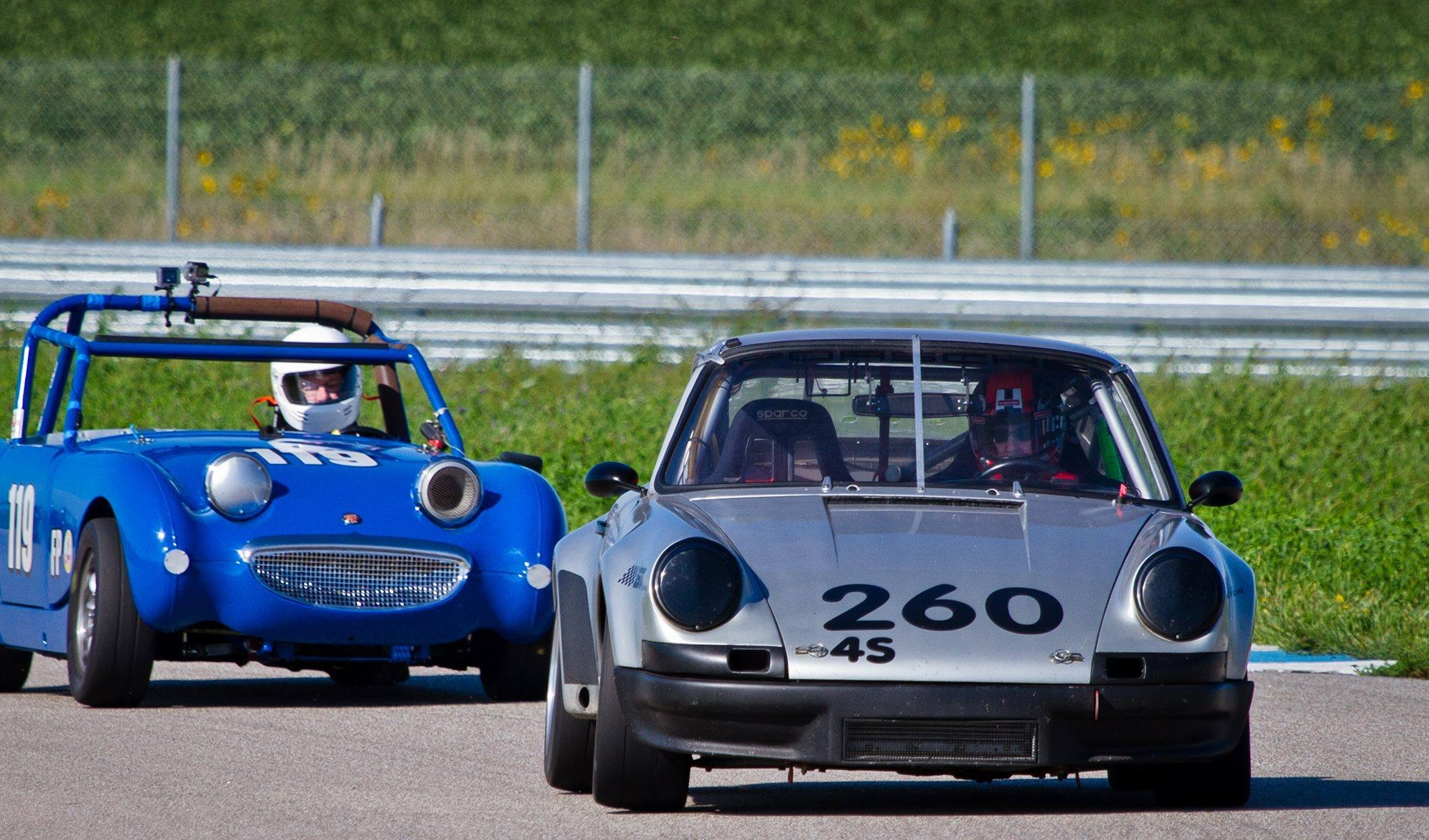
Porsche

In February 2009, Forbes.com named MPH one of the “Best Places to Speed Legally in the United States.”
