= P1 SuperStock =

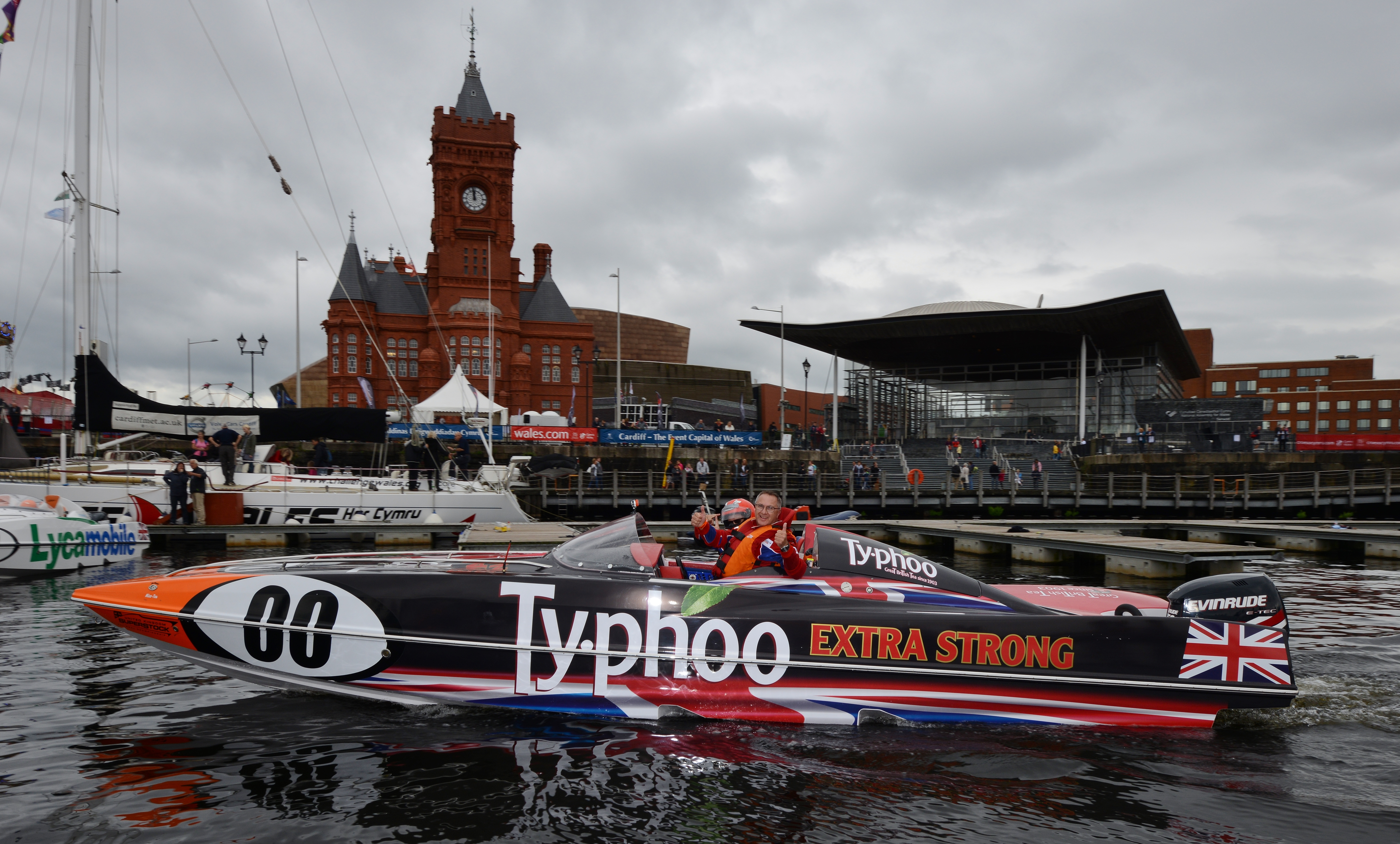
The P1 SuperStock Typhoo Panther at Cardiff, 2015

P1 SuperStock is a powerboat racing series with a United States, and formerly a United Kingdom, championship.

Powerboat P1 is an international marine motorsport promoter that organizes powerboat racing championships across multiple competition levels.

Powerboat P1 owns the rights to the P1 SuperStock Championship which is one of the most accessible and most affordable forms of motorsport today (see below). The Powerboat P1 team works closely with the sport's governing body, the Union Internationale Motonautique (UIM), national marine federations and the wider marine industry, and has delivered more than 85 world championship races in over a dozen countries over 10 years.

== 2017 UK Championships ==
The 2017 UK Championships was a three-round competition hosted in Aalborg, Greenock and Milford Haven. The eventual winners were Sam and Daisy Coleman in the Pertemps Panther, sealing the win on the final race of the series in Wales. Second went to Milford Waterfront who claimed the event win on home waters in Milford Haven, while third was Experience Kissimmee.

Also racing in the 2017 UK Championships was teams from Typhoo, Spirit of Inverclyde, PickfordsFX, Platinum Products, South Street and Arthur J Gallagher.

Positions at the end of the 2017 UK Championships
| Position | Team | Points |
|---|---|---|
| 1 | Pertemps Network | 247 |
| 2 | Milford Waterfront | 242 |
| 3 | Experience Kissimmee | 174 |
| 4 | PickfordsFX | 174 |
| 5 | Typhoo | 172 |
| 6 | Spirit of Inverclyde | 151 |
| 7 | Platinum Products | 140 |
| 8 | Arthur J Gallagher | 130 |
| 9 | South Street | 48 |
