= Speedway Super Prix =

The Super Prix was an event introduced by the Fédération Internationale de Motocyclisme (FIM), and Speedway Grand Prix organisers, Benfield Sports International, to the 2008 Speedway Grand Prix series offering an additional prize fund of US$200,000 to the Grand Prix riders. Four Super Prix events were held at four rounds of the Grand Prix season, with the winner of each of the four events qualifying for the Super Prix Final. The Super Prix final was won by Polish rider Tomasz Gollob.

== Rounds ==
The four Super Prix meetings will take place at the Swedish, Danish, British and German Grand Prix rounds which are held at the largest stadia on the Grand Prix calendar. Each Super Prix represents a helmet colour, and the winner of each Super Prix round will wear this colour and have the corresponding starting gate in the Super Prix Final. The Grand Prix of Sweden winner will wear the red helmet (gate 1) in the final, the Danish GP winner the blue helmet (gate 2), the British GP winner the white helmet (gate 3) and the German GP winner the yellow helmet (gate 4). The Super Prix final is a one-off race between the four event winners held after the German Grand Prix in the Veltins-Arena, Gelsenkirchen on 11 October 2008. The Grand Prix of Germany is also the last Grand Prix event of 2008.

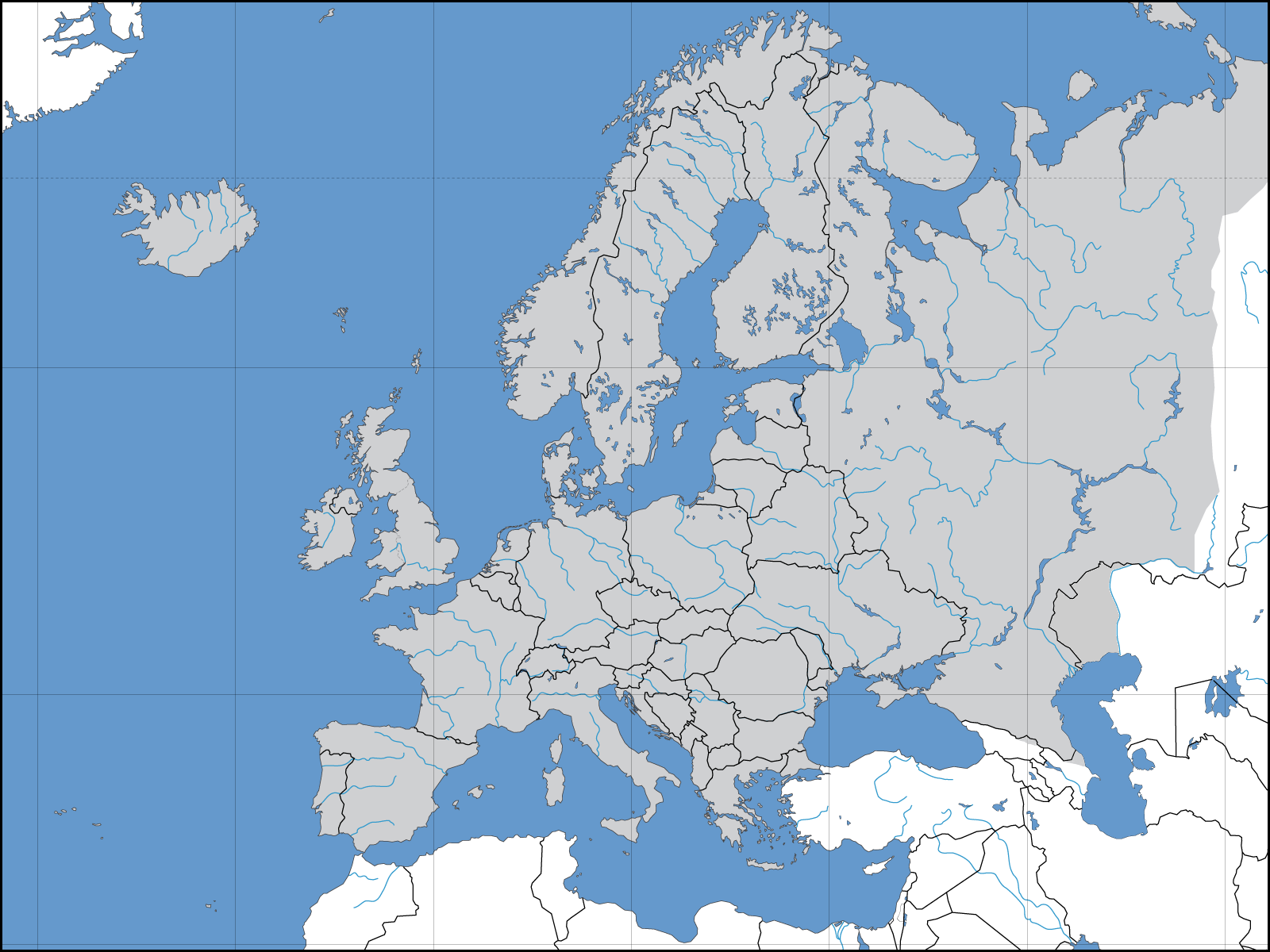

The 2008 Super Prix events:

- 24 May 2008 (Sweden) Swedish Grand Prix, Ullevi Stadium, Gothenburg (Red helmet)
- 14 June 2008 (Denmark) Danish Grand Prix, Parken, Copenhagen (Blue helmet)
- 28 June 2008 (United Kingdom) British Grand Prix, Millennium Stadium, Cardiff (White helmet)
- 11 October 2008 (Germany) German Grand Prix, Veltins-Arena, Gelsenkirchen (Yellow helmet)

== Rules ==
If a Super Prix event is won by a rider who has already qualified for the Super Prix Final, then the World Championship Final Classification following the completion of the Grand Prix of Germany determines who is awarded a place in the final. If a rider has won more than one Super Prix he will take the starting gate colour of his first Super Prix win and if a rider is unable to participate in the Super Prix Final due to injury or other circumstances, they are replaced using the World Championship Final Classification. Wild card and reserve riders can also qualify to the Super Prix Final in Germany. The Super Prix events do not affect the World Championship standings.

== Prize fund ==
The $200,000 prize fund is the richest race ever contested in speedway. Following the completion of the Super Prix final the prize fund is awarded as follows:

- 1st place: $120,000
- 2nd place: $40,000
- 3rd place: $25,000
- 4th place: $15,000

== Event winners ==
Norwegian born Polish rider Rune Holta won the 2008 Swedish Grand Prix and in doing so became the first rider to qualify for the super Prix final. Holta takes the red helmet and the inside gate 1 for the final in Germany. Polish rider Tomasz Gollob won his second Grand Prix round of the season at the Grand Prix of Denmark and became the second rider to qualify for the final, taking the blue helmet and gate 2.Jason Crump won his first Grand Prix since 2006 at Cardiff's Millennium Stadium to take the white helmet and gate 3. The final round of the Super Prix took place on 18 October in Bydgoszcz after the German Grand Prix was cancelled due to adverse track conditions, and was won by Tomasz Gollob.

Super Prix Event	Gate Position	Winner
Sweden	1	(Poland) Rune Holta
Denmark	2	(Poland) Tomasz Gollob
Great Britain	3	(Australia) Jason Crump
Germany	4	(Poland) Tomasz Gollob

== Final ==
The final of the Super Prix took place at the Polonia Stadium, Bydgoszcz on 18 October 2008. Nicki Pedersen qualified for the final in the yellow helmet colour as the highest placed rider in the World Championship Classification after Tomasz Gollob won his second Super Prix event at Bydgoszcz.

Result:

1. (Poland) Tomasz Gollob
2. (Australia) Jason Crump
3. (Poland) Rune Holta
4. (Denmark) Nicki Pedersen (excluded for touching the start tapes)

== See also ==
- Motorcycle speedway
