= Atlanta Motorsports Park =

Auto racing facility in Dawsonville, Georgia

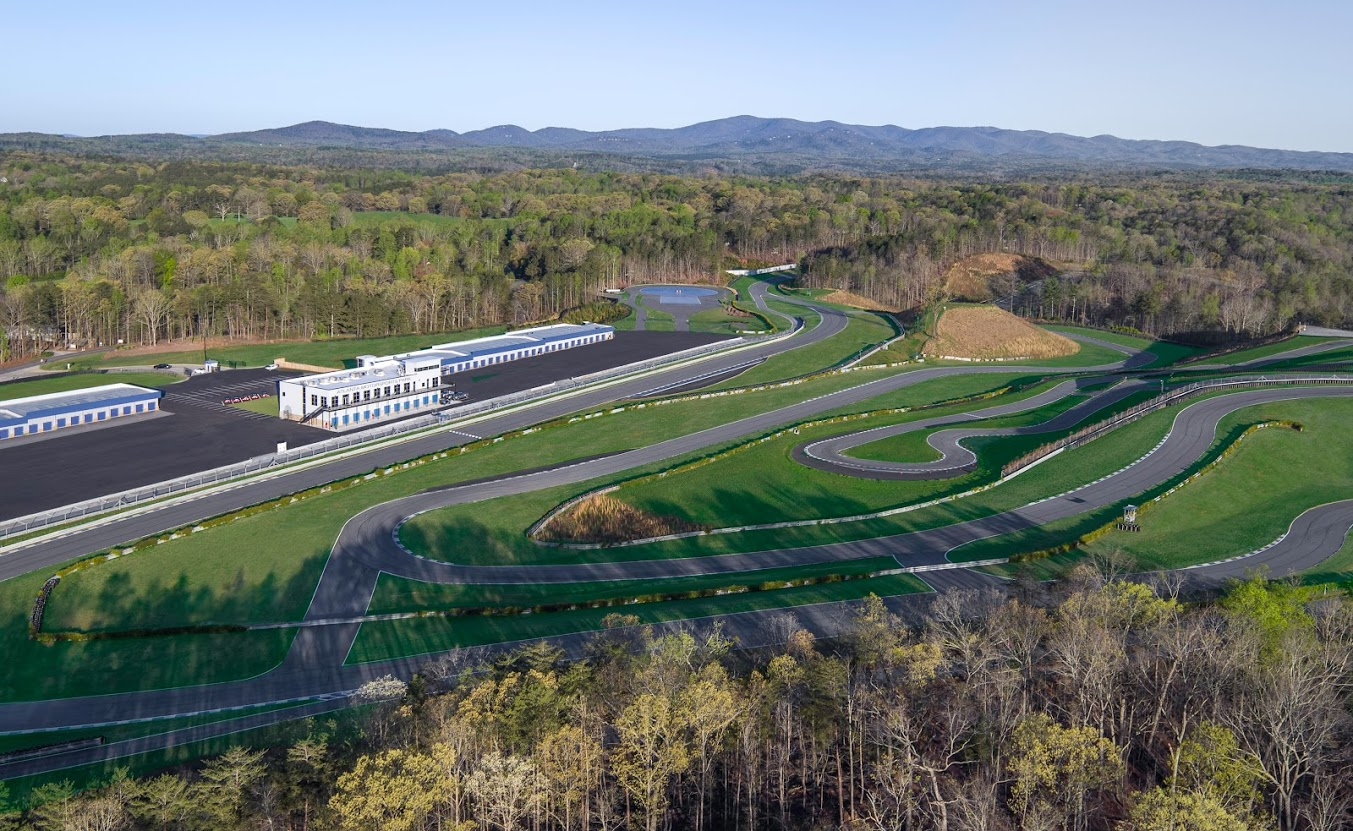
- Atlanta Motorsports Park
- Location: Dawson County, Dawsonville, Georgia, United States
- Coordinates: 34°26′05″N 84°10′37″W
- Owner: Jeremy W. Porter
- Architect: Hermann Tilke
- Major events: Optima Batteries Chump Car World Series

The Road Circuit
- Surface: Asphalt
- Length: 1.9999 mi (3.2186 km)
- Turns: 16
- Race lap record: 1:13.48 (Jacob Looomis, USF2000, 2025, USF2000)

Kart Circuit
- Surface: Asphalt
- Length: 0.850 mi (1.368 km)

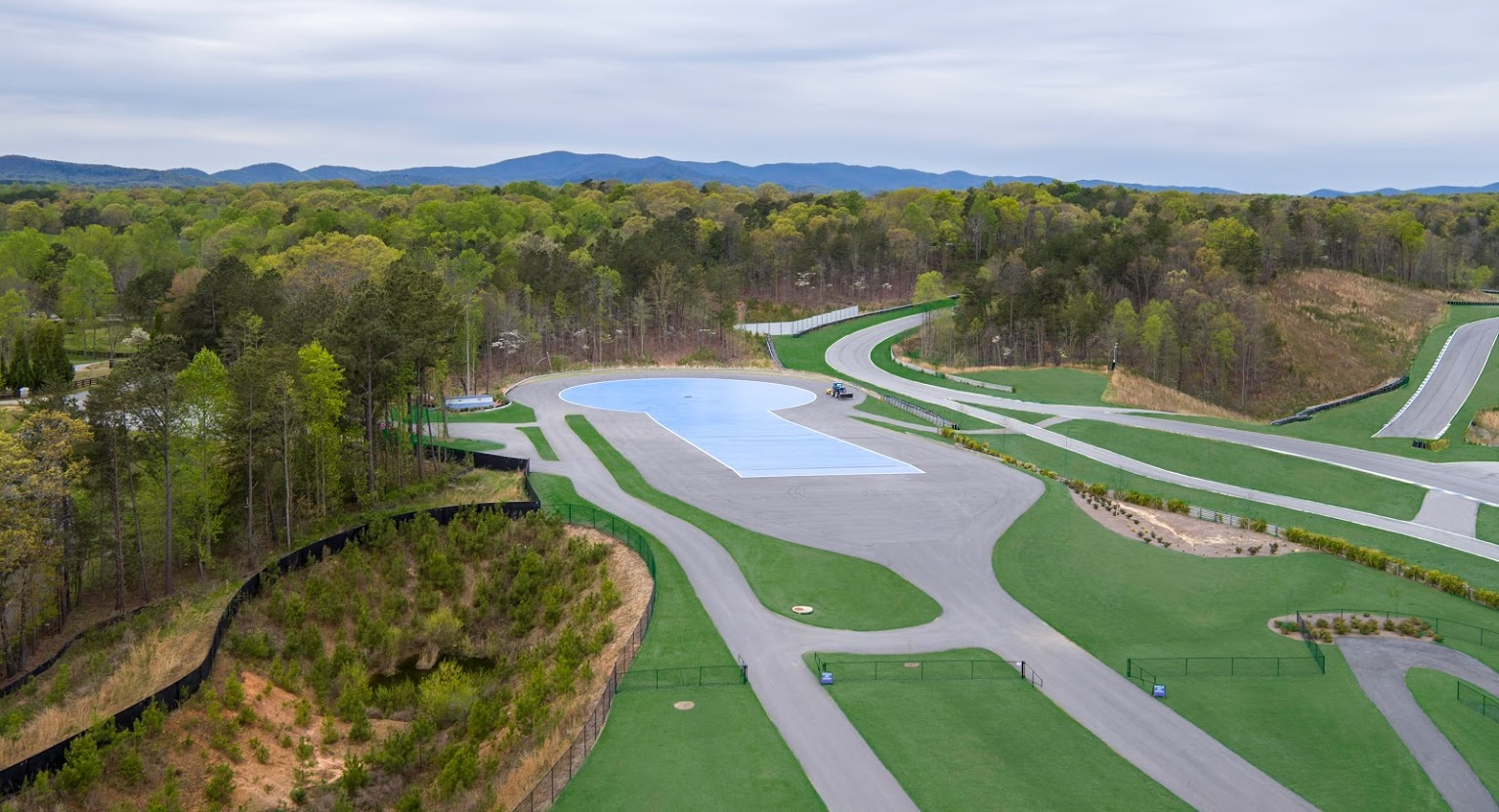
Driver Development Centre - 7.5% slope "Ice Hill" and 200 foot Skid Pad

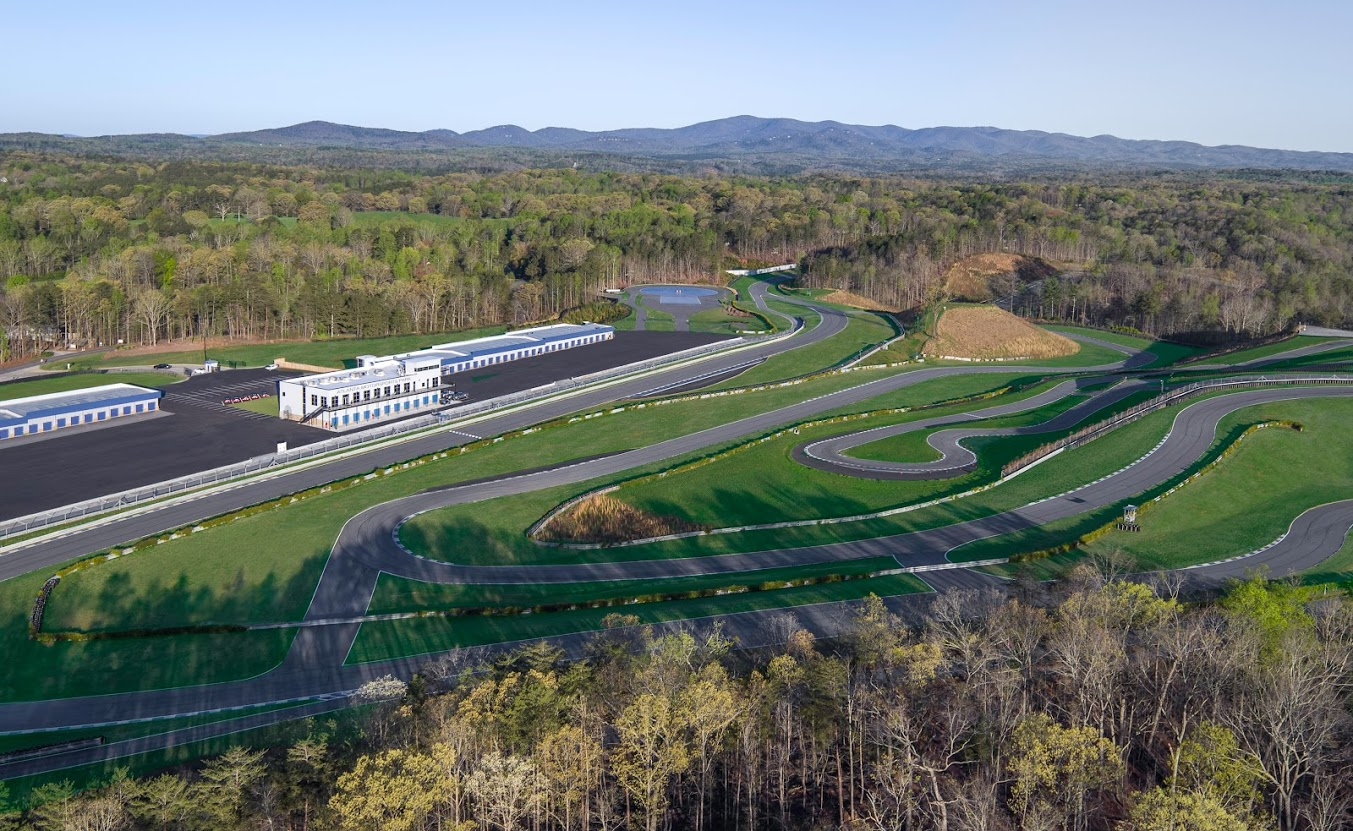
Picture of the straight, turns 16 to 8 and part of the kart circuit

Atlanta Motorsports Park (AMP) is an American auto racing facility that contains two driving circuits in the North Georgia mountains. Designed by Formula One architect Hermann Tilke, Atlanta Motorsports Park's two-mile main road course is held in high regard by outlets such as Road & Track, who named it to its list of Top 10 Tracks in North America. The park is known for the aggressive elevation changes and technical layout. Atlanta Motorsports Park has two "signature" corners as a tribute to Europe's road circuits: Belgium's Circuit de Spa-Francorchamps and Germany's Nürburgring.

In close proximity to the main circuit, Atlanta Motorsports Park's Driver Development Center has an on-site skid pad and an ice hill, providing a place to test in both wet and dry conditions. Atlanta Motorsports Park's second circuit is a professional kart circuit built to CIK Level A/1 Standards. It is .83 miles in length and has 43 feet of elevation changes.

== History ==
Jeremy W. Porter is the creator and CEO of Atlanta Motorsports Park. Porter began as a driver in Formula ICC kart racing and went on to win two consecutive Southeastern Points Championships. Jeremy Porter saw the business potential in creating his own track; consequently, AMP was created.

The first official race at AMP was the inaugural ChumpCar World Series Race in November 2013.

== Road circuit description ==
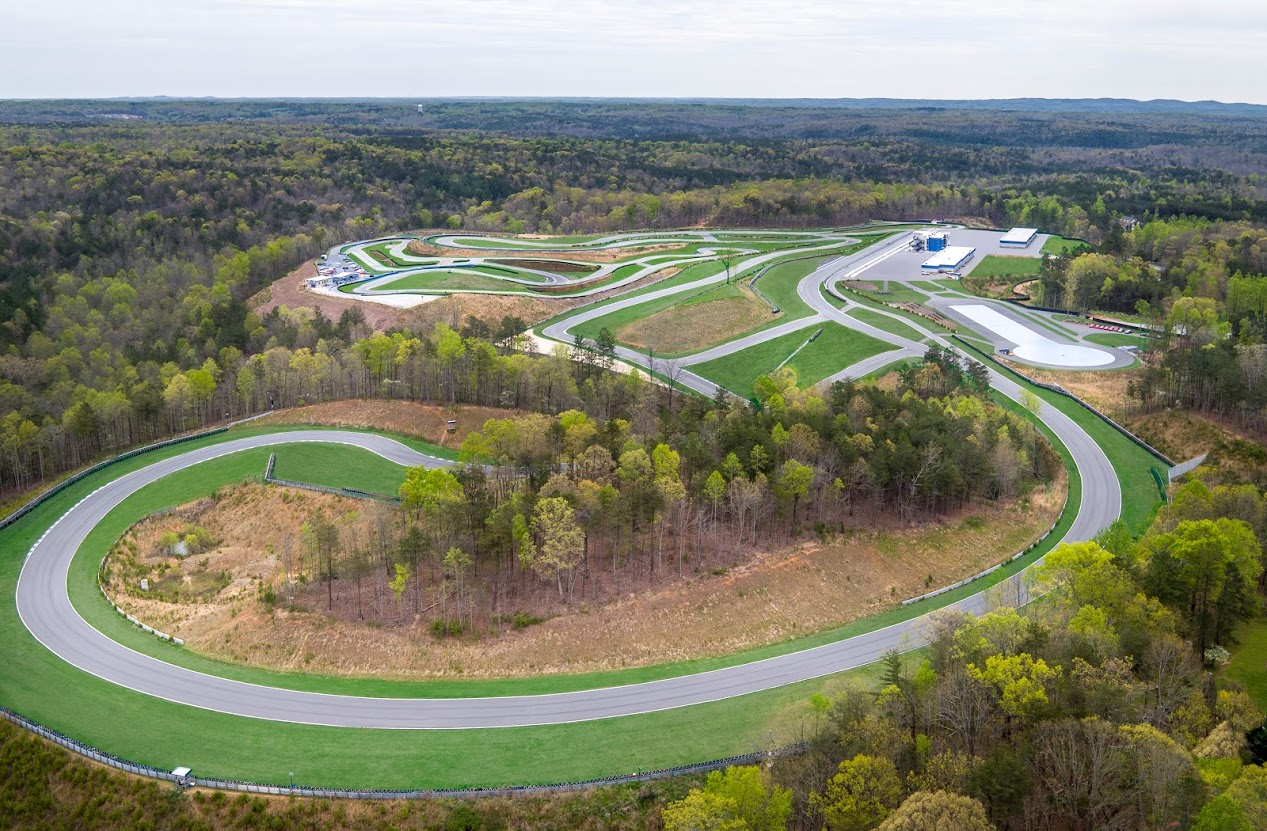
Picture of circuit from turns 12 to 15

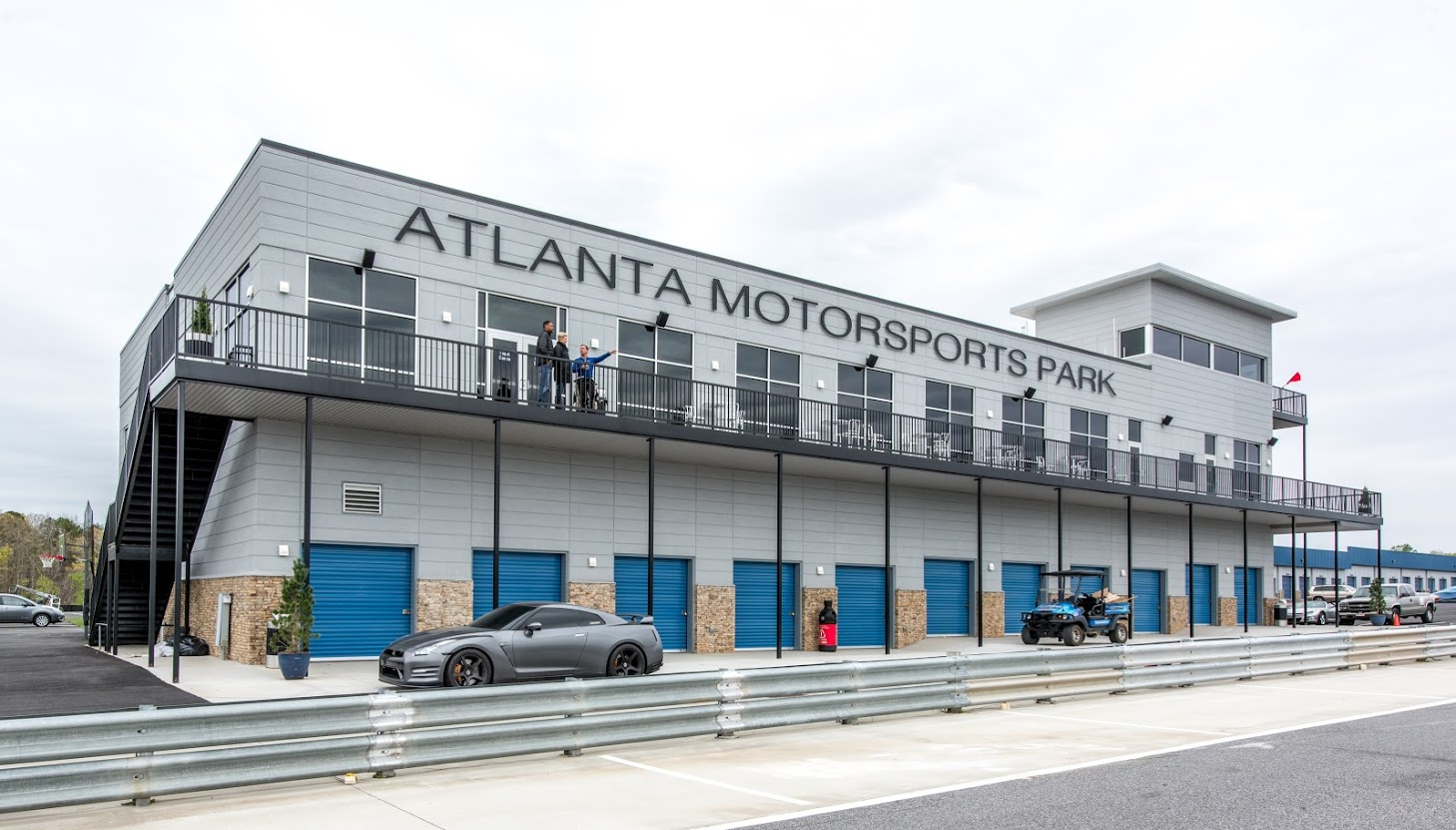
Circuit facing side of conference 21,000 square foot conference centre

AMP's road circuit consists of a two-mile track that was designed by Formula One track architect Hermann Tilke. The track consists of 16 turns and 98 feet of elevation changes throughout the course. To accommodate all driver skill levels, the circuit can be configured in several different ways and can host up to three simultaneous events. Two famous corners have also been incorporated into the track: Spa-Francorchamp's corner of Eau Rouge and the famous Carousel corner from Germany's Nürburgring track.

== Kart circuit ==
AMP's kart circuit is a 0.85 mi (1.368 km) long track that can be divided into four separate tracks and allows up to three simultaneous events at once. The track was built to meet CIK Level A standards, and the full course has 43 feet of elevation changes. It is known around the world to have the most radical elevation changes of any kart track in the world.

AMP hosts a few different kart races, including Endurance Karting, WKA, Chump Car, SCCA, NASA, World Racing League, ProCup Karting League, member racing series, time trials, and the Public Karting Racing Series.

== In the media ==
In 2013, AMP was featured on an episode of MotoMan when George J. Notaras (MotoMan) interviewed the Vice President of Marketing for Cadillac, Don Butler, and drove a Cadillac ATS around the track.

Motor Trend's Wide Open Throttle drove and reviewed the 2013 Cadillac ATS at the road circuit, where the article and video were then posted on July 26, 2012.

A commercial for the Ford Escape EcoBoost challenge that aired in March 2013 was filmed at the road circuit.

CNN Money filmed a segment at the road circuit on the Aston Martin Rapide S that aired in June 2013.

AMP was also a part of Taste of Speed's Rally For CURE 2013, a charity driving event that started at Ferrari Maserati of Atlanta and ended at Atlanta Motorsports Park. The event was created to raise money for CURE Childhood Cancer, 2013 was its inaugural year.
