= Bonneville Offroad Racing =

- Sport: Off-Road Racing
- Abbreviation: BOR
- Founded: 1989
- Headquarters: Salt Lake City, Utah
- President: Kyle MacArthur

Official website
- www.bor-racing.org
- (United States)

Bonneville Offroad Racing (BOR) is a desert racing organization based in Salt Lake City, Utah.

Bonneville Off-road Racing Enthusiasts (BORE), the predecessor to BOR, was established by Jim Baker in 1989 as a local, more affordable, friendlier, alternative to the Southern California and Mexico races put on by SCORE. Even with its lean organizational team, it offered full seasons of challenging, well-planned and well-marked courses, with all the hallmarks and perks of a much larger, professionally run organization (e.g., big-name event sponsors, informative newsletters, comprehensive points-scoring, computerized event-timing). It is believed to be the first of its kind to have state-of-the-art, computerized event-timing with real-time scoring (developed by Potter Engineering & Consulting), which allowed racers and spectators to monitor the up-to-the-minute race status of all event entries. Before his own passing (in 2014), Jim passed the leadership-torch to a team of enthusiastic successors, who continue to put on races in northern Utah, northeastern Nevada, and southern Idaho.

== Events ==
The BOR racing series consists of six events a year, taking place from April to October.

- Vernal Dinosaur Dash – Vernal, Utah
- Freedom 200 – Jackpot, Nevada
- White Knuckle 200 – Knolls, Utah
- Lucky Chance 200 – Wendover, Utah
- Junction Jam 200 – Grand Junction, Colorado
- Wagon Wheel 200 – Rangely, Colorado

== Historical events ==
- Ely 200 – Ely, Nevada
- Aragonite GP – Aragonite, Utah
- Delle GP – Delle, Utah
