= Formula Car Challenge =

United States car race event

- Category: Open Wheel Racing
- Country: United States
- Inaugural season: 2005
- Constructors: World Speed Inc. (FS2.0) Moses Smith Racing (FM) Star Race Cars (PFM)
- Engine suppliers: Mazda
- Tyre suppliers: Goodyear
- Official website: The Official Formula Car Challenge presented by Goodyear Website

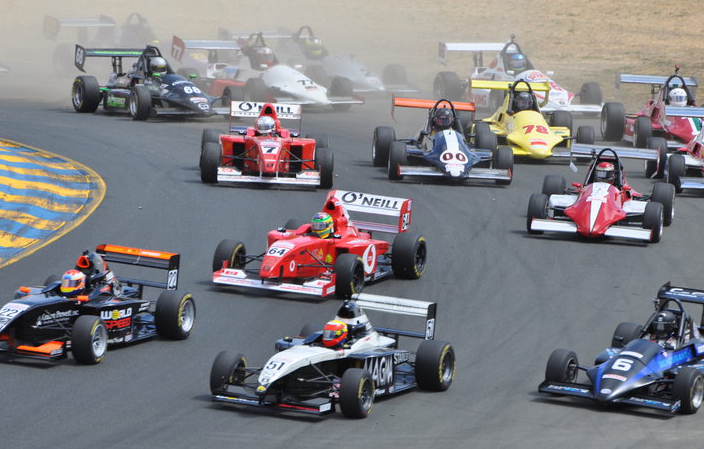
FCC racers charge into turn 2 at Infineon Raceway

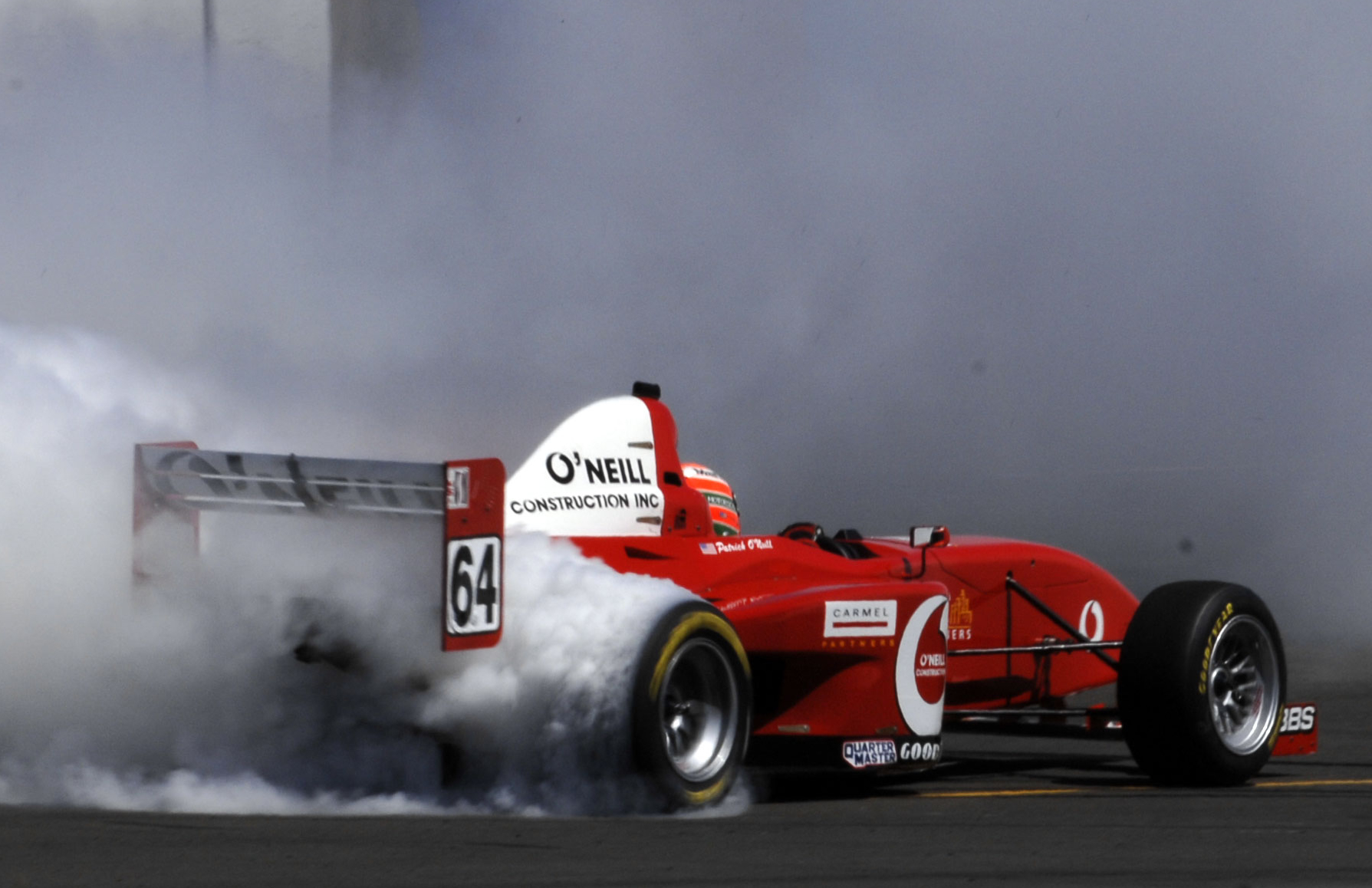
FCC Champion celebrates with a massive burnout

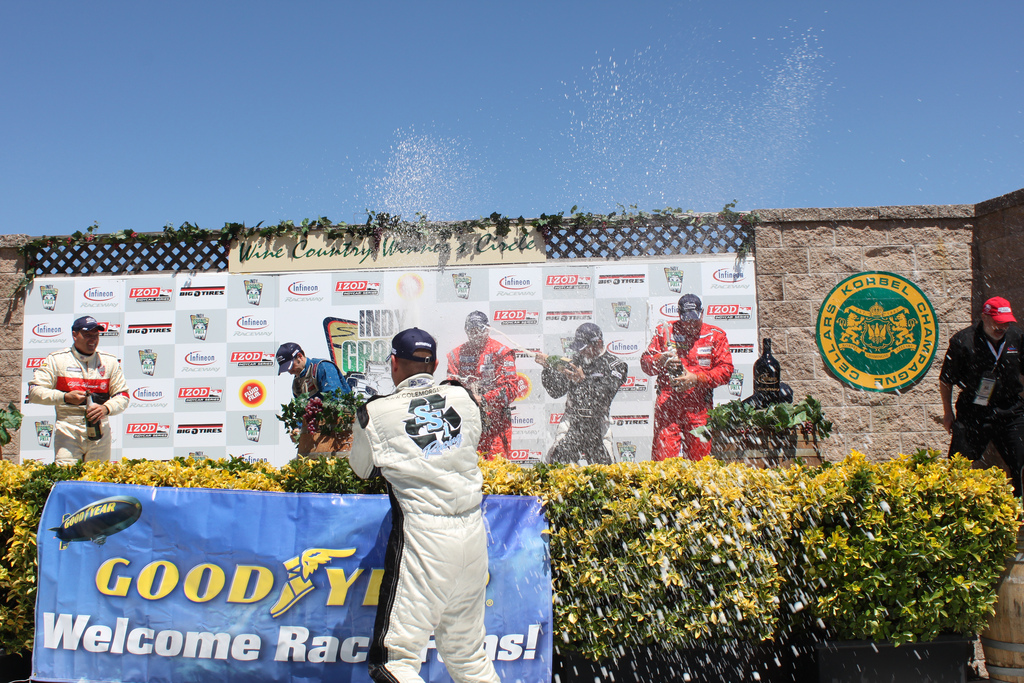
FCC podium celebration

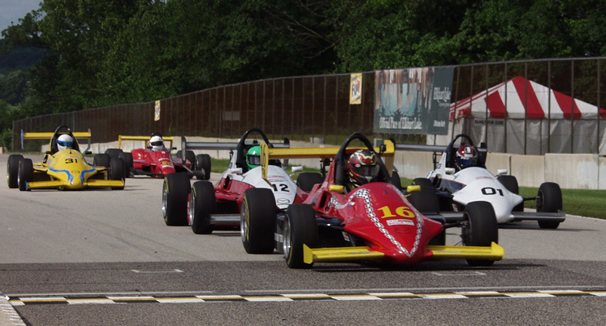
Formula Mazda battle in the FCC

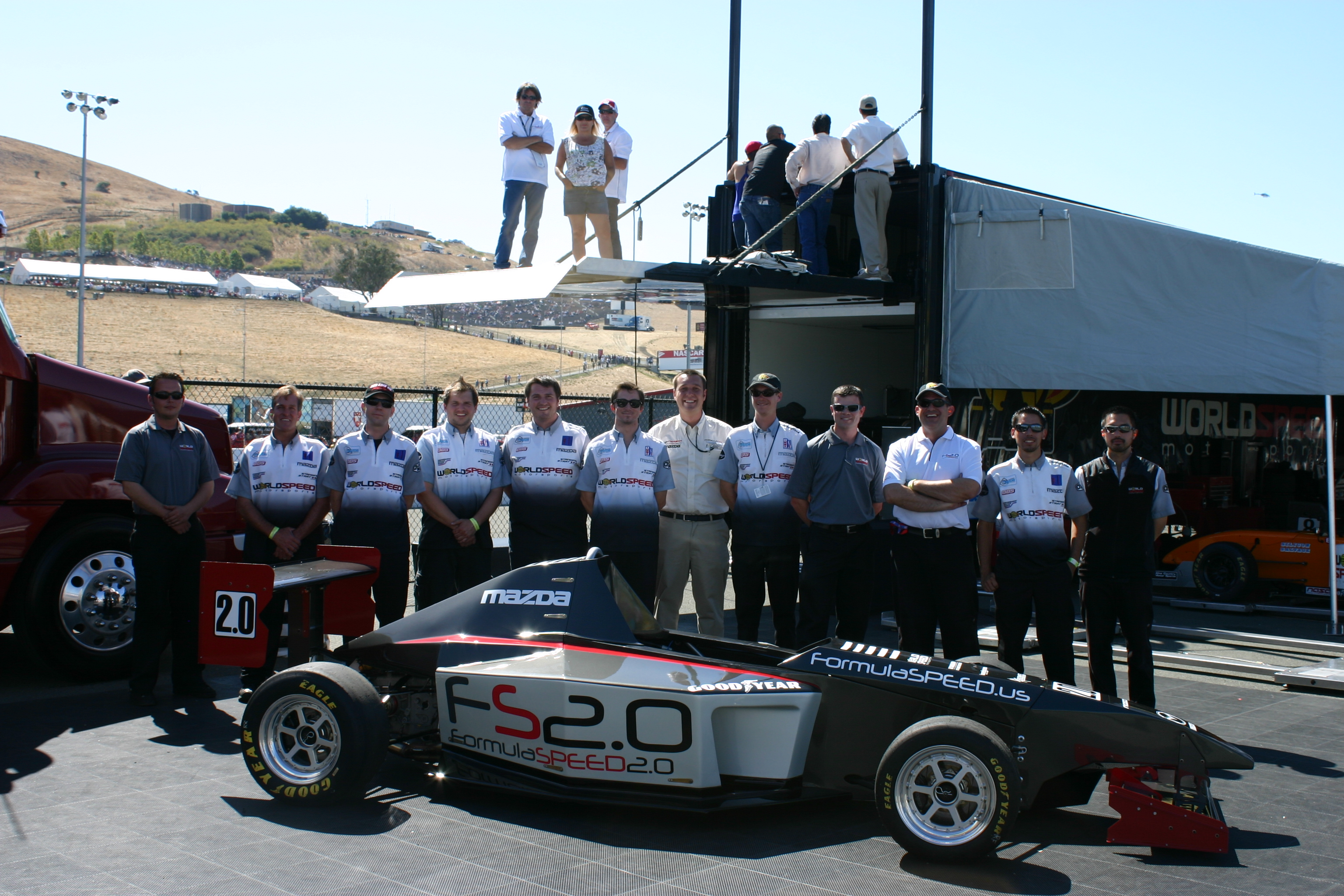
Debut of the all new FormulaSPEED2.0 at Indy Grand Prix of Sonoma

The Formula Car Challenge presented by Goodyear is a National Auto Sport Association-affiliated car racing series, operating in four different regions across the United States: West Coast, South West, East Coast and Mid West. There is also an annual championship involving all four regions. While each region varies in terms of events, the series itself has three classes of competition, all powered by Mazda, with Goodyear Racing tires: Formula Mazda (FM), Pro Formula Mazda (PFM), and the FormulaSPEED2.0 (FS2.0).

The Formula Car Challenge was started in 2005 to allow for a high level of competition in a quality environment without "pro racing budgets." By 2009 there were four regions in place in key markets of the United States. Goodyear presenting sponsorship was secured in 2010, as was a National Auto Sport Association sanctioned national championship. Mazdaspeed Contingency Awards associated with the Formula Car Challenge National title have included close to $30,000 in cash, and eligibility for the MAZDASPEED Career Advancement Award.

== Formula Mazda ==
Formula Mazda cars are built to spec entirely by Moses Smith Racing except for the motor provided by Daryl Drummond Enterprises. A steel space frame with a 95-inch wheelbase is used. Power is provided by a sealed 1.3 litres (79 cu in) Mazda 13B rotary engine producing 180 horsepower (130 kW) connected to a five-speed racing transmission. All parts must be as provided by the official manufacturer, though certain aspects may be adjusted within regulations so as to accommodate the various tracks used.

=== Permitted adjustments ===
- Shock absorbers
- Sway bars
- Brake bias
- Wing angles
- Gear ratios
- Tire pressure

== FormulaSPEED ==
The FormulaSPEED car is built on a chassis manufactured by Fast Forward Racing Components and constructed out of 4130 Chrome Moly Alloy steel tubing. The firewall, undertray, and side panels are bonded and riveted aluminum. Fiberglass is used for the bodywork, with 4-layer Kevlar for side protection and composite structure for front crash protection. Suspension is double-wishbone with dampers and springs provided by Öhlins and uprights of billet aluminum alloy 7075. Power is produced by a 2 litres (120 cu in) liter Mazdaspeed MZR with VVT which produces 200 horsepower (150 kW). Engine mapping is by Hasselgren Engineering, controlled by an SQ6 ECU by Cosworth/Pectel, fueled by an FIA certified fuel cell. Power is transmitted to the wheels through a Hewland FTR six-speed sequential transaxle, and tires are Goodyear Formula Eagle G19 with 13" diameter. The brakes are floating rotors and aluminum calipers provided by Wilwood, with brake bias adjustable from the cockpit.
