= Benji LaCrosse =

American racing driver

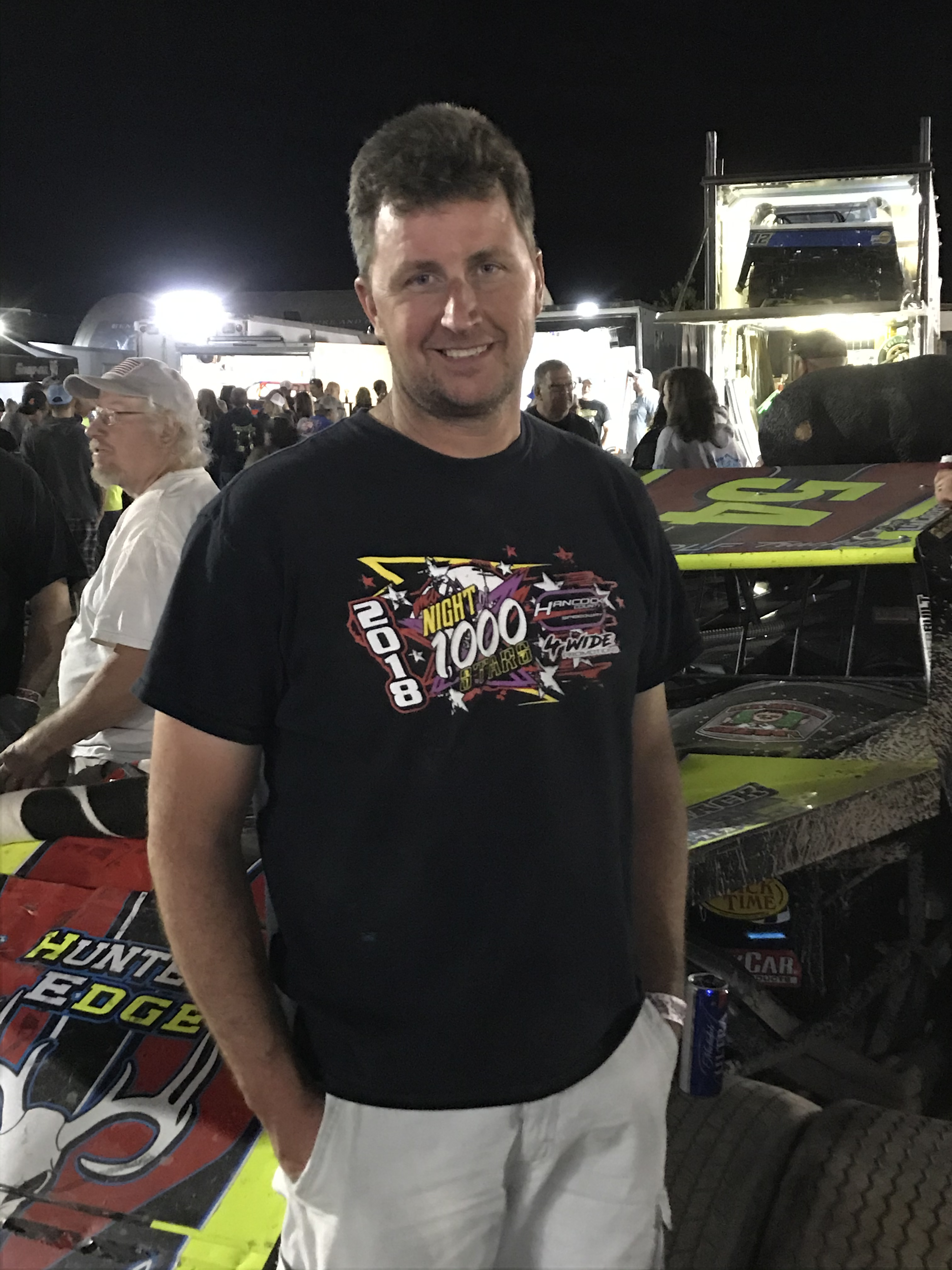
- Nationality: American
- Born: May 10, 1977 (age 49) Luxemburg, Wisconsin

IMCA Modified career
- Debut season: 2003
- Car number: 54
- Engine: Baril
- Starts: 500+
- Championships: 1
- Wins: 140+

Previous series
- 2000-2002, 2019-present: IMCA Stock Car

Championship titles
- 2006: IMCA Modified

Benji LaCrosse (born May 10, 1977 in Luxemburg, Wisconsin) is an American racecar driver. He was the 2006 IMCA Modified national champion, and the winner of the 2005 IMCA SuperNationals.

== Racing career ==
=== IMCA stock car ===
After purchasing his first car for $2500 in 1999, LaCrosse began racing in the IMCA stock car division in his first full season in 2000. He was the track champion at the Door County Speedway in Sturgeon Bay, Wisconsin.

LaCrosse was the Wisconsin state champion in his second season in 2001. He won the points championship at his hometown track (Luxemburg Speedway). He finished second at Door County (then called Thunderhill Speedway) and the Seymour Tri-Oval. He finished second in the points at Thunderhill Raceway in 2002.

LaCrosse returned to the IMCA stock car division in 2019 to run double duty throughout the year with his IMCA modified running primarily at 141 Speedway and Marshalltown Speedway. In his return season LaCrosse ran a part time schedule with the stock car resulting in a 16th place points finish with 4 heat wins at 141 Speedway. The following year however, LaCrosse ran a full-time schedule at 141 Speedway and got his first feature win since returning to the class at the season opener. LaCrosse finished the 2020 season with 7 total feature wins in the IMCA stock car division five of those wins came during a third place points campaign at 141 Speedway with the following two coming at Outagamie Speedway where LaCrosse returned to with a part-time schedule.

=== IMCA Modified ===
LaCrosse moved up to the IMCA Modified division in 2003. He won the rookie of the year at Luxemburg Speedway, Seymour, and Thunderhill.

LaCrosse won the Wisconsin state championship in the IMCA Modified division in 2004. He became the first driver ever to qualify a modified and an IMCA stock car at the IMCA Super Nationals.

He became the first Wisconsin driver to win the IMCA Super Nationals in 2005, when he won the IMCA Modified event. He received a parade by his hometown of Luxemburg, Wisconsin. He won the track championship at Luxemburg.

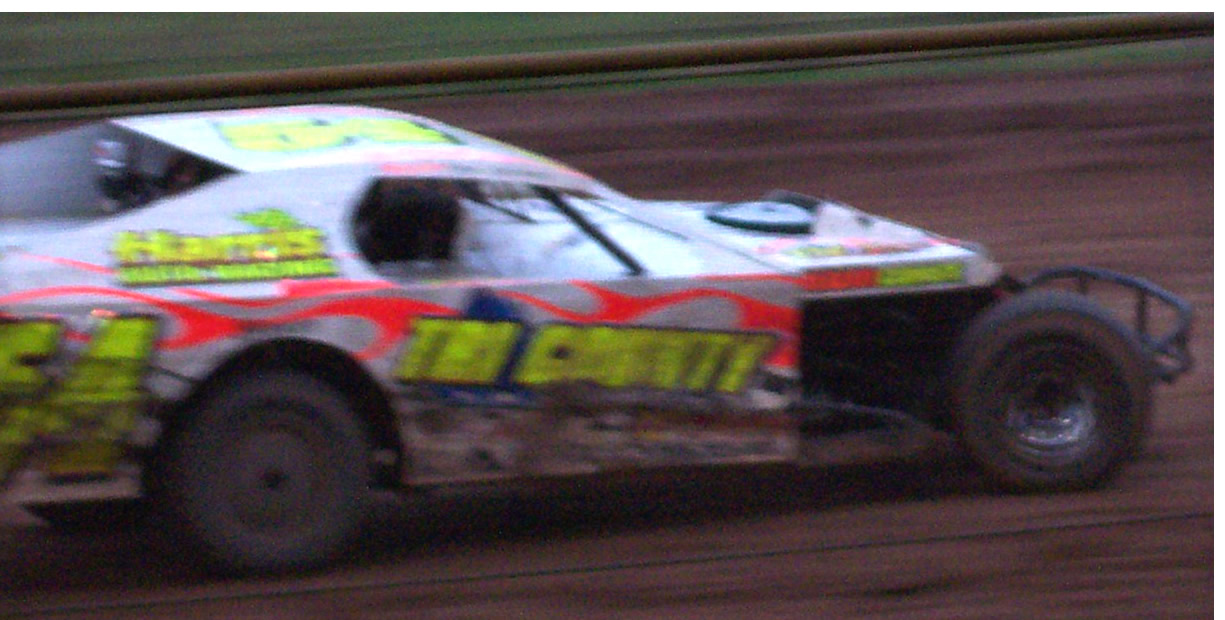
2006 National Championship car

LaCrosse was the 2006 IMCA Modified National champion, becoming the first Wisconsin driver to do so. He won the North Central regional championship, the Wisconsin state championship, and track championships at Luxemburg and Seymour. He was voted one of the Top 10 most popular drivers in IMCA at the All Star Invitational Race. As of the end of the 2006 season, LaCrosse has 45 IMCA Modified and 31 IMCA Stock Car feature victories.

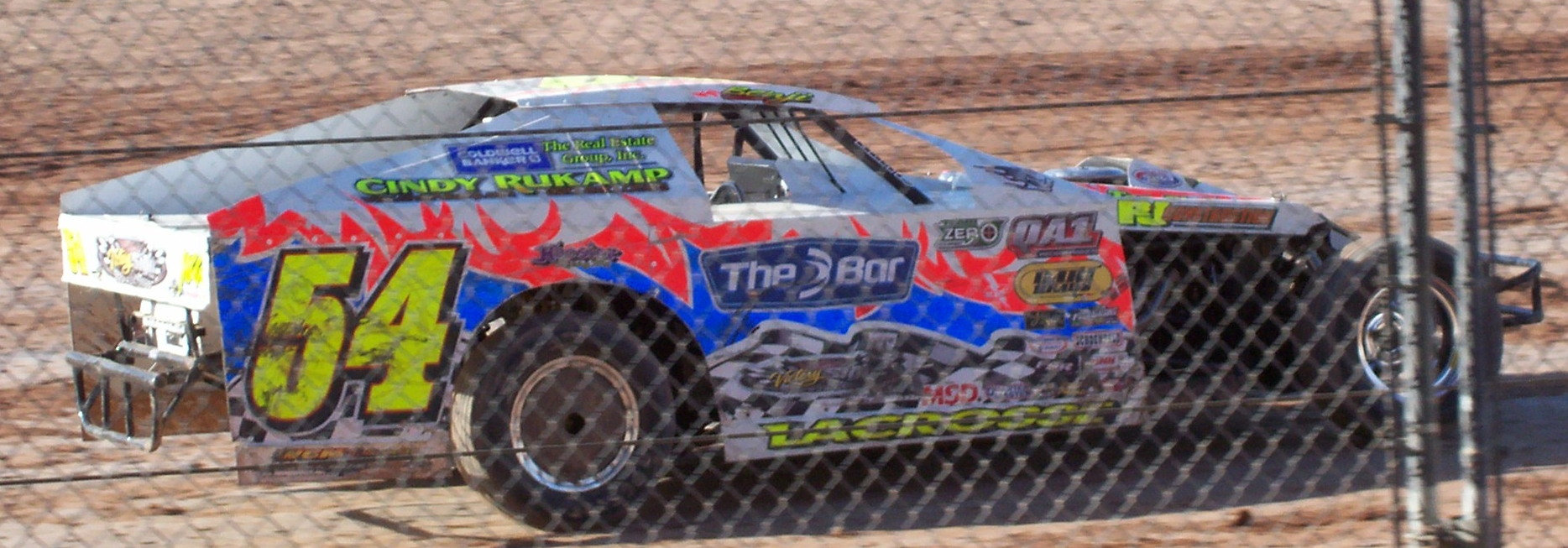
LaCrosse in 2007

LaCrosse was the 2007 track champion at Thunderhill Raceway in Sturgeon Bay, Wisconsin. He finished second at Luxemburg, third at Seymour. The Luxemburg and Seymour season championships were won by 2007 IMCA Modified National champion Jared Siefert. On August 11 he had his first win at Shawano Speedway. He finished second in the Wisconsin state championship behind Siefert, sixth in the North Central region, and fifteenth nationally. At the 2007 IMCA Super Nationals he won his heat race and last chance races before finishing 25th in the feature.

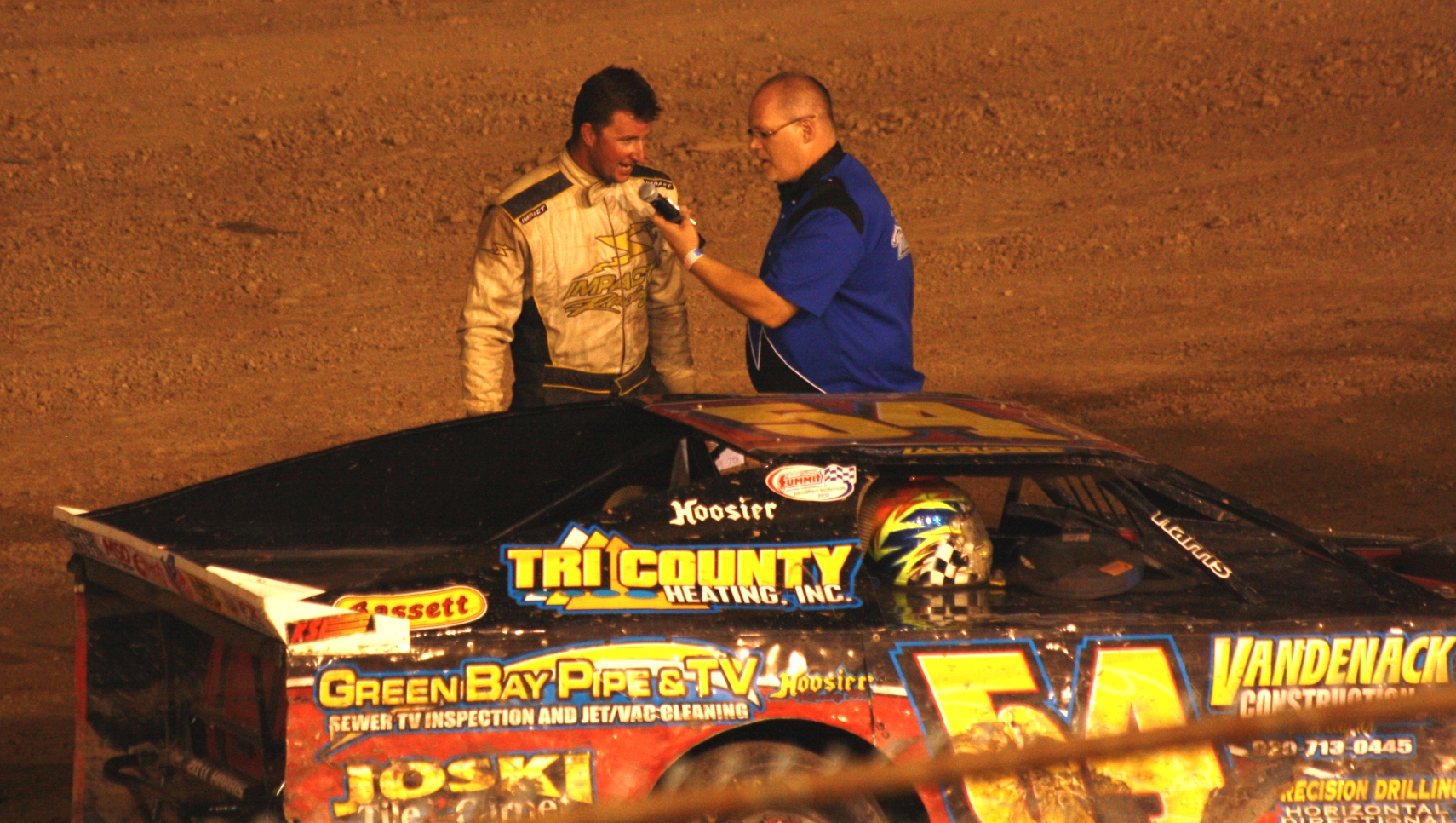
LaCrosse after winning 2012 Badger Modified Tour race

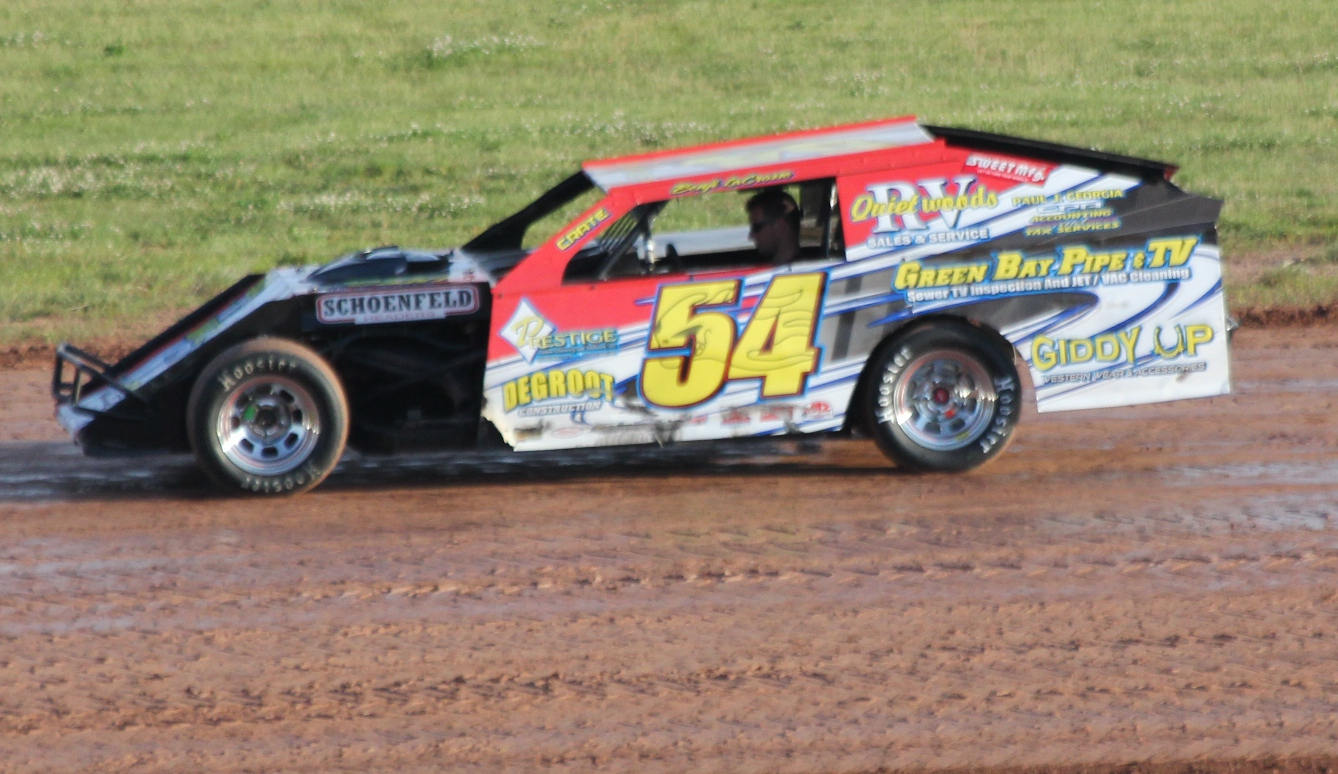
2015 Modified

He started his 2008 season by winning his heat and the feature at Luxemburg. He won the feature on the following evening at Shawano.

LaCrosse had several big money race wins in 2013. He won the $10,000 Clash at the Creek on the dirt at 141 Speedway in July. He won almost the same amount at the Night of 10,000 Stars at Hancock County Speedway in Britt, Iowa. LaCrosse raced in the Badger Modified Tour in 2012 and 2013.

LaCrosse won his 100th IMCA Modified feature on July 12, 2015 at Seymour Speedway. In 2016, he won the $10,000 Clash at the Creek race at 141 Speedway over a field of IMCA Modified drivers from across the nation.

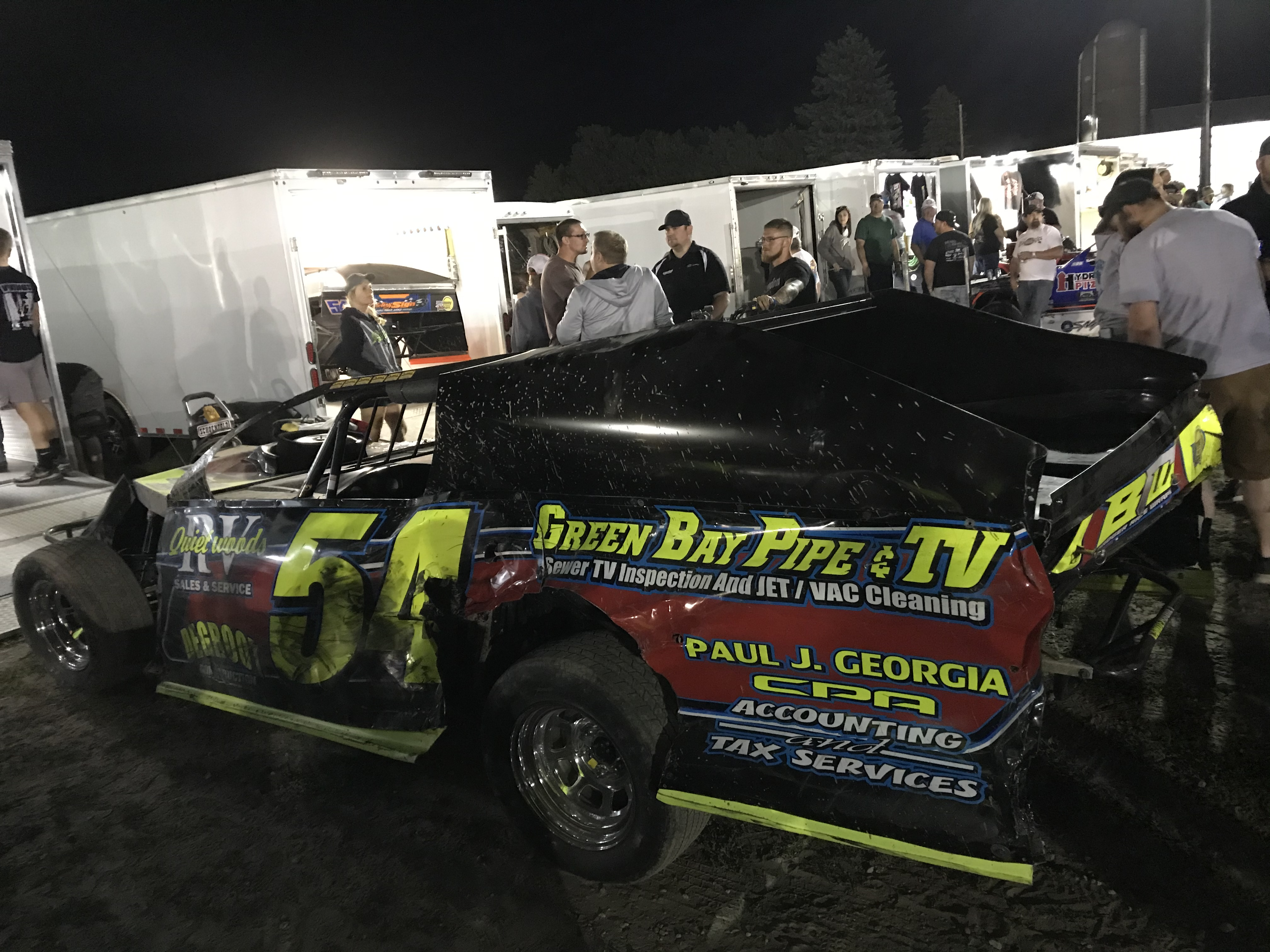
LaCrosse's 2020 IMCA Modified.

In 2017, LaCrosse said that he would stop running full-time at tracks like Luxemburg and Seymour and focus more on high-paying races like the Cheesehead Triple Crown and IMCA SuperNationals. LaCrosse cited a lack of family time as the reason for stepping away from those weekly tracks.

=== Spilt seasons ===
While racing on a part-time schedule in Modifieds in 2019, LaCrosse switched chassis manufacturers from Madman to Vanderbuilt and also returned to the IMCA Stock Car division. The following year, LaCrosse earned a $5,000 payday by winning the King of the Creek IMCA Stock Car event 141 Speedway.

== Personal life ==
LaCrosse was born in Luxemburg, Wisconsin, but later moved to Green Bay, Wisconsin. In 2021 he bought his dream home in Casco, Wisconsin and now lives there with his family. He has two daughters, Kendyl and Anika. Now Kendyl goes to Luxemburg-Casco School where Benji also went as a child.
