= The Hill Raceway =

Race track in Sturgeon Bay, Wisconsin

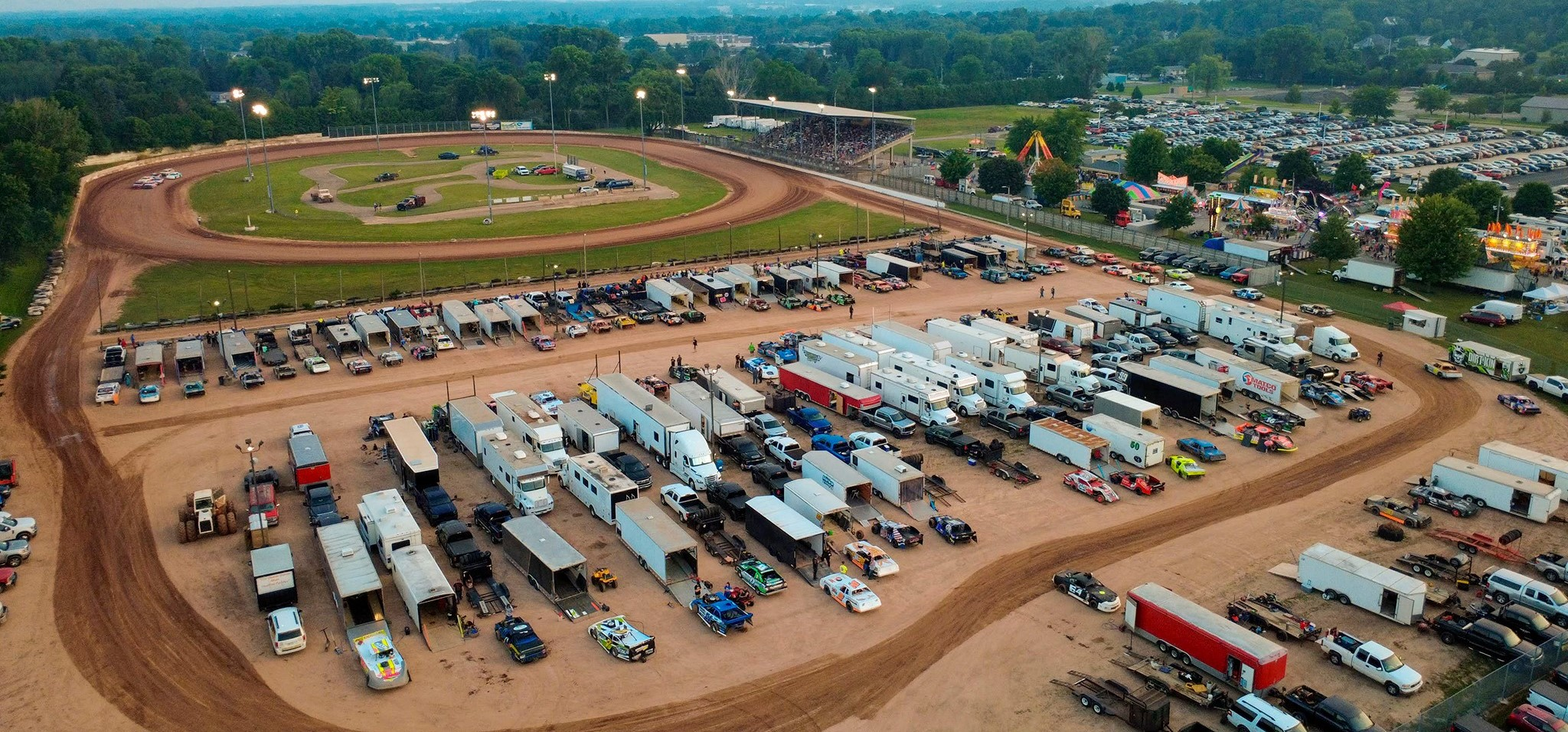
- Fair Night 2025 at The Hill Raceway The Hill Raceway in 2025
- Location: Sturgeon Bay, Wisconsin
- Coordinates: 44.8432°N 87.3577°W
- Operator: John Sternard; Adam Sternard
- Opened: 1950's–1983; 1993–2015; 2017–2019; 2021–present
- Closed: 1984–1992; 2016; 2020
- Former names: Thunderhill Raceway; Door County Speedway
- Major events: Door County Fair, IRA Bumper to Bumper Outlaw Sprint Series

1/3 mile
- Surface: clay
- Length: 0.33 mi (0.53 km)
- Turns: 4
- Race lap record: 12.097 seconds (Danny Schlafer, 2025, 410 Winged Sprint Car)

The Hill Raceway (formerly Thunderhill Raceway) is a dirt racing track located in John Miles County Park, in Sturgeon Bay, Wisconsin on the Door County Fairgrounds. The track is 1/3-mile and hosts a part-time racing program throughout the summer with several International Motor Contest Association classes racing primarily on Saturday nights.

== History ==
=== Early days ===
The Door County race track was among the earliest venues to host stock car racing in northeastern Wisconsin, with events dating back to the early 1950s. The weekly racing program operated successfully for several decades under the Door County Speedway name. By the early 1980s, however, the track experienced challenges similar to those faced by many local grassroots racing facilities, including declining attendance, incomplete seasons, and financial difficulties.

=== First shut down and comeback (1980's–2002) ===
The track shut down for the first time in the early to mid 1980's with no come back in sight for the near future. It would not be until nearly a decade later when Rick Ledvina and Carolyn Tordeur would bring the track back to life and host weekly racing again in 1993. The pair operated the track throughout the 1990s and into the early 2000s, overseeing a period of renewed stability and growth in local stock car racing.

During the track's inaugural season following its reopening, four divisions competed on a weekly basis: Modifieds, Stock Cars, Street Stocks, and a Bomber division. The Bomber class proved particularly popular due to its relatively low cost and limited maintenance requirements compared to other divisions.

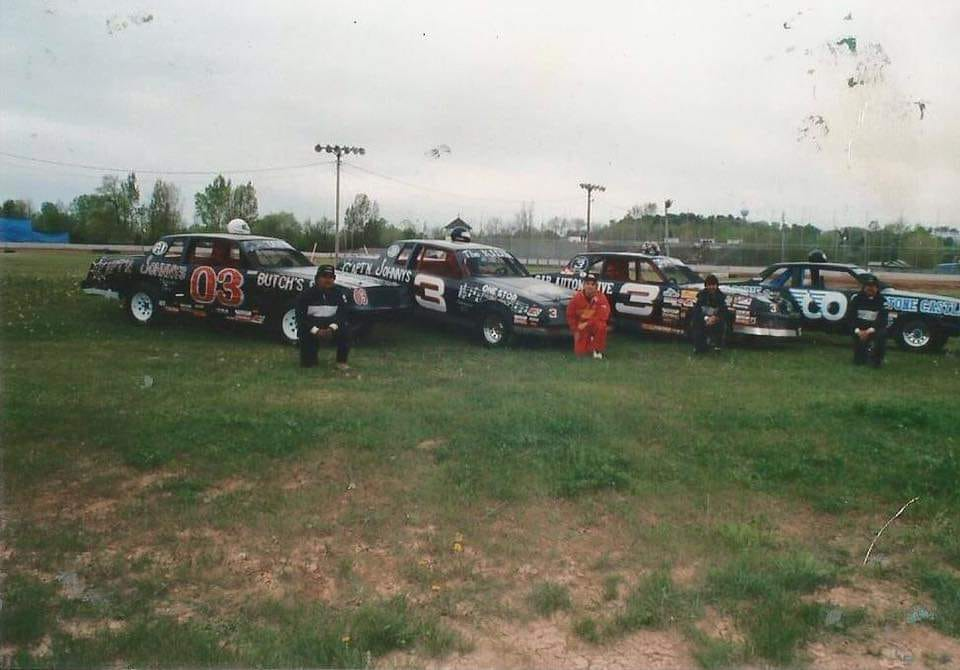
Bomber Division cars and drivers at Thunderhill Raceway in 1995. From right to left: "Rollover" Rick Lemieux, Clyde "The Glide" Lemieux, Marty "The One Man Party", and Tim Bielke pose in front of their race cars prior to competition.

Following the 1998 season, construction began on new grandstands to replace the track's original bleachers. The project was completed during the offseason. Bryan "Woody" Wodack was a prominent supporter of the facility, sponsoring multiple events through his business, Woody's Signs. Following the 2002 season, Wodack would move up from being just a sponsor to become the new promoter of the Sturgeon Bay oval.

=== Wodack era (2003–2015) ===
Wodack remained in the promotional role throughout much of the 2000s, overseeing weekly Saturday night racing during a period of relative stability for the facility. Following a change in promotion, two additional divisions were introduced at Thunderhill Raceway: Hobby Stock and Sport Compact, increasing the weekly racing program to six classes. This structure remained in place through the 2006 season. In 2007, a seventh division, the IMCA Sport Modified, was added to the schedule. However, the introduction of the new class coincided with the discontinuation of the Bomber division after the 2007 season, returning the weekly program to six divisions. During this time, the track received coverage from regional television outlets, including WBAY-TV and NBC 26, reflecting its prominence within the local racing community.

In the early 2010s, however, the track began to experience declining car counts and attendance once again. Increased competition, including another regional speedway moving its race program to Saturday nights, contributed to challenges in maintaining participation and spectator support. The Sport Compact division was even discontinued following the 2012 season.

Prior to the 2015 season, Thunderhill experimented with Sunday night racing and ultimately adopted the schedule change for the full season. The adjustment did not produce the anticipated improvement in turnout. The track introduced a new weekly division known as the Thunder Trucks. A similar class had previously competed at the now-defunct Manitowoc Speedway. Throughout the season, the division struggled to attract competitors and never had more than three entries in a single event. Following the conclusion of the 2015 season, Wodack announced he would step down as promoter. With no successor immediately assuming control, the track did not operate during the 2016 season.

=== PKS3 era (2017–2023) ===
In August 2016, it was announced that a new promotion group would take over operations of the track for the 2017 season. The group, known as PKS3, consisted of former racers Brandon Peterson, Martin Kelsey, John Sternard, and Mike Sargent, along with Sargent's wife, Melanie.

With the arrival of the new promotion group, several changes were introduced ahead of the 2017 season. Most notably, the facility was rebranded from its longstanding name, Thunderhill Raceway, to The Hill Raceway as part of an effort to signal a new era for the track and attract renewed interest.

The race program also underwent significant changes. Several divisions were removed from the schedule due to low participation, including Modifieds, Hobby Stocks, and Thunder Trucks. At the same time, a Sport Compact division was added for the first time since 2012, becoming the fourth full-time class at the track.

The Sport Compact class was initially introduced as an enduro-style division featuring both four- and six-cylinder cars competing in 50-lap feature events held as the final race of the night each week. However, due to limited participation, the format was soon changed to a traditional Sport Compact class similar to those run at nearby tracks, which resulted in increased car counts. Thunder Trucks that had previously attempted to compete in the enduro-style class were also permitted to participate in the new division.

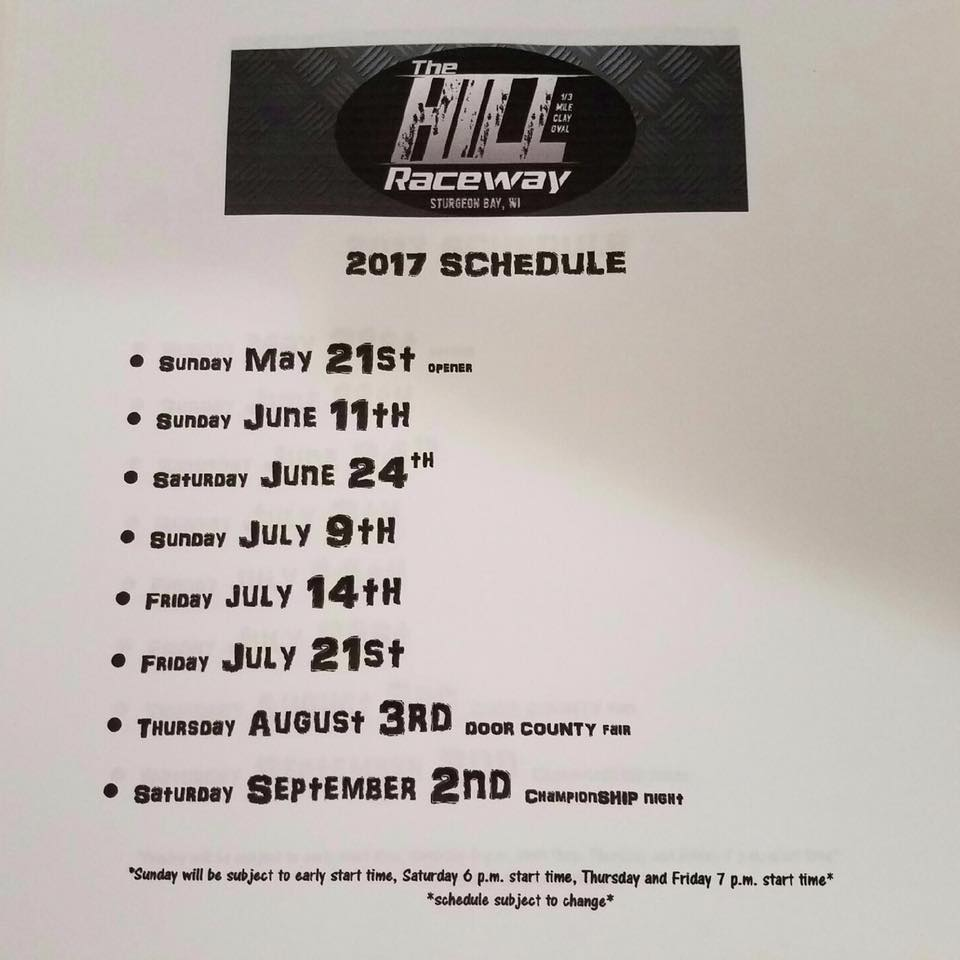
Hill Raceway 2017 Schedule

The final change to the racing program was the adoption of a part-time schedule rather than attempting to hold races every weekend. This approach allowed track officials to coordinate with other venues when creating the schedule, enabling the track to hold events on dates when nearby tracks were not racing, thereby reducing competition for car counts. As a result, more drivers had the opportunity to compete at the facility, leading to increased participation across all divisions. During the 2018 and 2019 seasons, the track recorded some of its highest car counts and fan attendance in more than a decade. During this period, the modified division also returned to the schedule, competing in a limited number of events as a fifth part-time class.

Plans for the 2020 season were disrupted by the emergence of the COVID-19 pandemic. The track initially postponed the scheduled opening night several times as the situation developed. In June 2020, the track announced that the entire racing season would be cancelled due to the pandemic.

The track returned to regular operations in 2021 without significant issues. Over the following two seasons, the weekly program continued as scheduled and recorded several successful events. One of the highest car counts in the track's history occurred on August 11, 2022, during the county fair, when 103 cars checked in across five divisions.

Following the conclusion of championship night for the 2023 season, PKS3 announced through the track's Facebook page that it would be stepping down from its role as promoter. The announcement also stated that there was already interest from potential parties in taking over promotional duties for the 2024 season.

=== Sternards era (2024–present) ===
In December 2023, it was announced that former promoter John Sternard, along with his cousin Andrew Sternard, would assume promotional duties for the track. Shortly after the announcement, a schedule was released that continued the part-time format used in previous seasons.

The highlight of the schedule was a late-season event that marked the return of sprint car racing to the facility for the first time in more than a decade. The event featured the IRA 410 Sprint Car Series and the Wisconsin Wingless Sprints Series, along with a rotating support class competing for a $1,000 prize. The race was announced as a special event intended to be held annually.

In 2024, another part-time division was added to the schedule, as the Grand Nationals returned for the first time since 2008. The series competed on select dates, following a format similar to that used for the modified division.

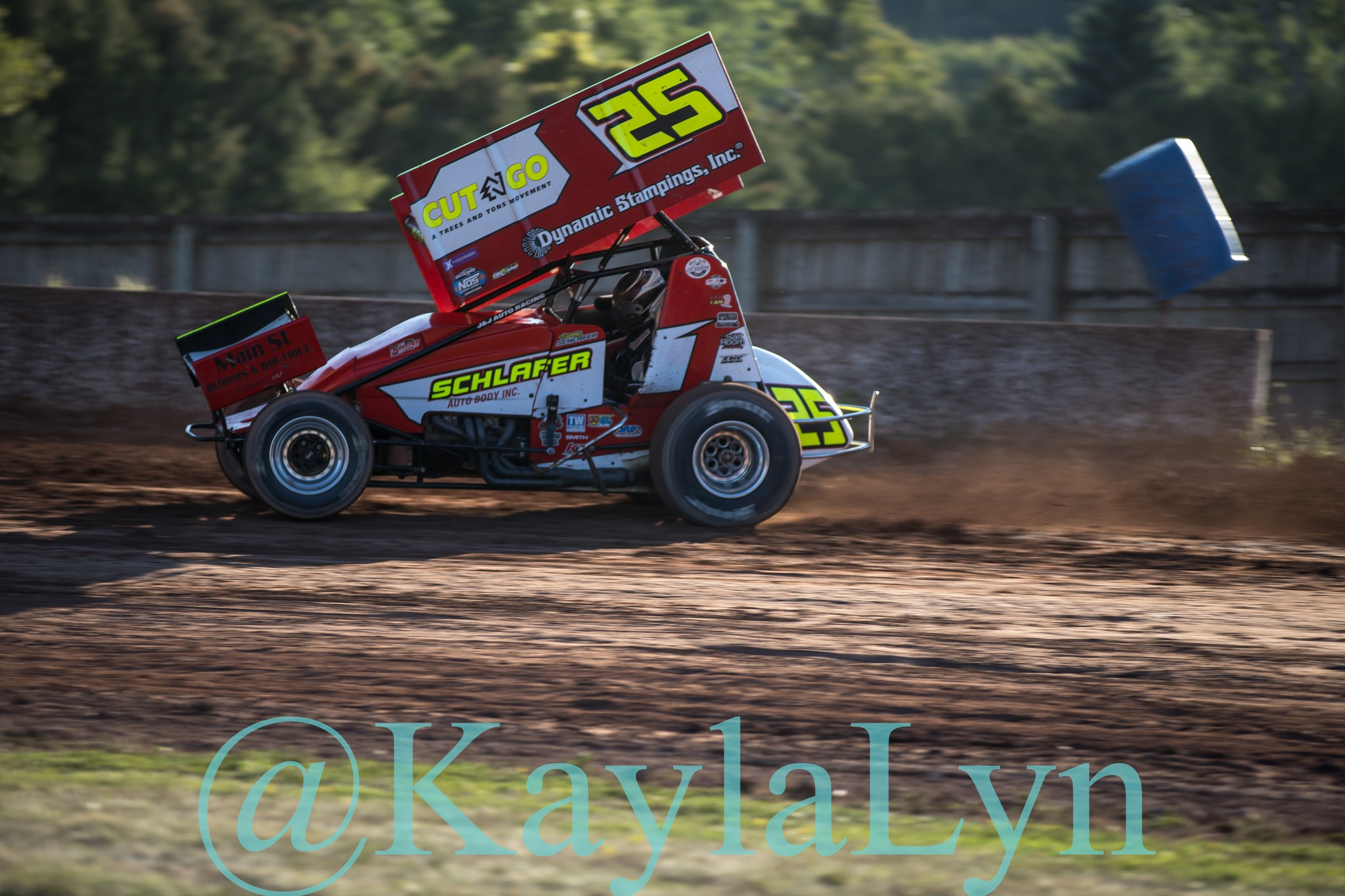
Danny Schlafer racing at The Hill Raceway in 2024.

During the inaugural sprint car event, Danny Schlafer of Gibson, Wisconsin, set the all-time track record for the fastest lap in his 410 winged sprint car during qualifying, with a time of 12.250 seconds. He went on to finish fifth in the feature race. The following year, Schlafer returned to The Hill and broke his own record, posting a new fastest lap of 12.097 seconds, though he again finished fifth in the feature.

Through 2024 and 2025, the Sternards have remained in the promotional role at the track and are preparing for the 2026 season. A schedule has been released, with the season set to begin on March 24 and continue throughout the summer, following the same part-time format used in previous years.

For the 2025 county fair, The Hill was scheduled to host Legend Cars with the Midwest Legends Dirt Series; however, the inaugural event was cancelled due to rain. The track plans to reschedule the event for the 2026 fair.

In 2025, Brett Wenzel of Manitowoc, Wisconsin won his sixth consecutive stock car championship at The Hill Raceway, extending a title streak that began in 2019. The achievement set a new track record for the most consecutive championships by a single driver. The previous record of five consecutive championships was held by Dave Bouche of Algoma, Wisconsin from 2012 to 2017.

== Events ==
=== Door County Fair ===
The Door County Fairgrounds have hosted the Door County Fair since the late 1800s. Racing at the fair began with horse competitions in the early 1900s before transitioning to auto racing. Once the track began running full-time schedules, the fair events consistently drew the highest car counts and fan attendance each year. A feature win on fair night at The Hill is regarded by local drivers as a prestigious achievement within the regional racing community. The 2022 fair night attracted a total of 103 cars across five divisions, marking one of the highest car counts in recent history.

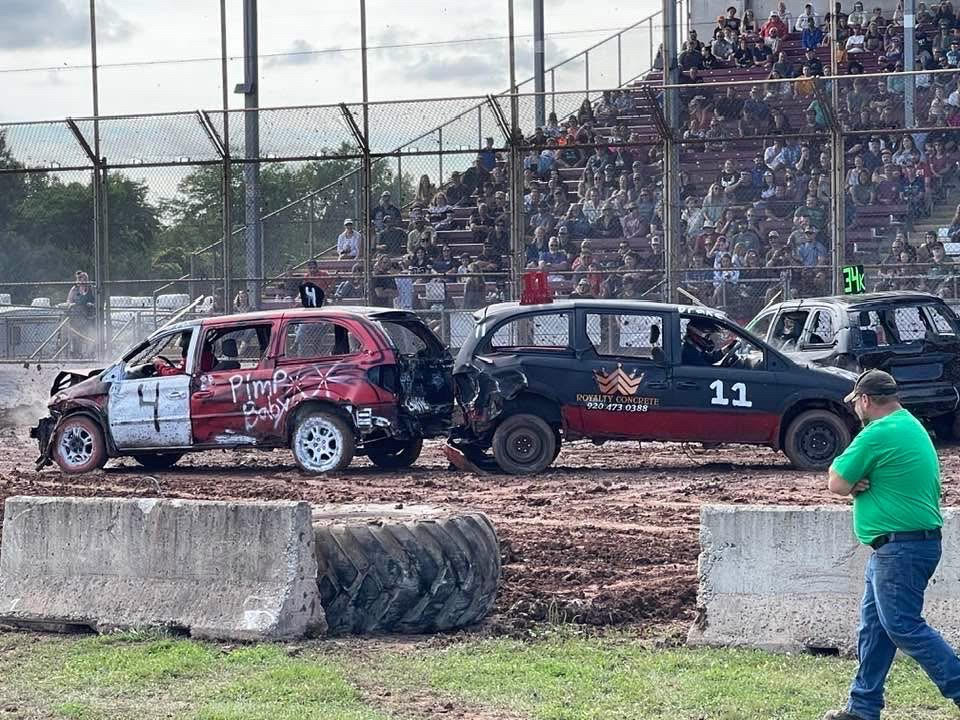
Jaxon Rankin (#4) and Drake Olsen (#11) compete in the mini-van class during the demolition derby at the 2025 Door County Fair.

When the track is not being used for auto racing, several other events are held on the grounds. The most notable of these is the annual demolition derby, which takes place on the front stretch each year. Other events hosted at the track during the fair include flat track motorcycle racing and tractor pulling.

=== Busch Shootout ===
The Busch Shootout is a unique event hosted by The Hill, in which the winning driver receives six cases of Busch Light beer. Each division—Street Stock, Stock Car, and Sport Modified—holds its own annual Busch Shootout on separate nights during the season. The event was first introduced in 2017, originally taking place before the official races, but the format was revised prior to the 2018 season.

Each Busch Shootout occurs midway through the season, following several points races. The top five drivers in points for the respective division heading into the night are automatically locked into the event. The remaining seven spots are filled by the next highest finishing drivers from that night's feature event, creating a 12-car field. After all feature races have concluded, the 12 qualified drivers compete in two six-car qualifying races. The top three finishers from each qualifying race advance to the six-car final, with the winner claiming the six cases of Busch Light beer.

== 2026 Event Winners ==
Date	Street Stock	Stock Car	Sport Modified	Four Cylinder
May, 24th	Travis Zirbel	Trent Nolan	Trevin Veesar	Scott Schlafke
May, 30th	Dave DeGrave	Caden LeMieux	George Henkel	Scott Schlafke
June, 27th	Tyler Fox	Caden LeMieux	Randy LeMieux Jr.	Bennett Glidden
July, 11th	Dave DeGrave	Jeremy Anschutz	Craig Dorner	Dallas Topel
July, 25th				
August, 1st				
August, 22nd				
August, 29th				

== Past champions ==
Past Track Champions (1993–2025)
Year	Street Stock	Sport Modified	Stock Car	Modified	Four Cylinder	Hobby Stock	Thunder Truck	Bomber
2025	Dave DeGrave	Craig Dorner	Brett Wenzel	Dan Ratajczak	Chase Ertel			
2024	Jason Geyer	Craig Dorner	Brett Wenzel	Dan Ratajczak	Scott Schlafke			
2023	Ed Anschutz	Craig Dorner	Brett Wenzel	Chris Pigeon	Scott Schlafke			
2022	Dave DeGrave	Randy LeMieux Jr.	Brett Wenzel	Todd Dart	Calvin Stueck			
2021	Troy Muench	Randy LeMieux Jr.	Brett Wenzel	Greg Gretz	Tony Everard			
2020	Season canceled due to COVID-19							
2019	Chase Solomon	Chris Budzban	Brett Wenzel		Tony Everard			
2018	Dave DeGrave	Tom Stark	Billy LeMieux		Tony Everard			
2017	Dave DeGrave	Craig Dorner	Dave Bouche		Don Jorgenson			
2016	Track did not run							
2015	James Dahlstrom	Cody Rass	Dave Bouche	Greg Gretz		Marcus Moede	Nathan Delsart	
2014	Geno Sternard	Chris Budzban	Dave Bouche	Todd Dart		Jeremy Jauquet		
2013	Keith Kickbusch	Bernie Reinhardt	Dave Bouche	James Lee Tebon		Scott Boulanger		
2012	Dennis Weidner	Bernie Reinhardt	Dave Bouche	James Lee Tebon	Joey Scoon	Tom Brumlic		
2011	Tony Everard	Brad Lautenbach	Troy Muench	Jay Matthias	Calvin Stueck	Brandon Peterson		
2010	Geno Sternard	Eric Arneson	Charlie Kroll & Greg Gretz	Jay Matthias	Jeremy Dubois	Luke Lemmens		
2009	Jeremy Wiitala	Cory Cochart	Mike Pierrard	Shawn Kilgore	Kipp Burlo	Frank Paul		
2008	John Sternard	Jeff Vlies	Matt Junio	Todd Dart	Tony Everard	Dave DeGrave		
2007	Scott Reinhardt	Jeff Dubois	Matt Junio	Benji LaCrosse	Tony Everard	Keith Kickbusch		Dan Merkle
2006	Von Eytcheson		Eugene Gregorich	Jared Siefert	Tony Everard	Keith Kickbusch		Dan Merkle
2005	Von Eytcheson & Mike Pierrard		Shawn Kilgore	Todd Dart	Tyler Smith	Ed Anschutz		Dan Merkle
2004	Aaron Thornton		Craig Paque	Jeremy Jacobs	Kenny Malcore	Ed Anschutz		
2003	Troy Muench		Shawn Kilgore	Todd Dart	Kenny Malcore	Joe Hegnet		
2002	Kevin Sternard		Craig Paque	Jared Siefert				Scott Reinhardt
2001	Gregg Siebold		Craig Paque	Todd Dart				Jeremy Wiitala
2000	Gregg Siebold		Benji LaCrosse	Todd Dart & Randie Back				Greg Soukup
1999	Bernie Reinhardt		Larry Karcz Jr.	George Henkel				Jay Naze
1998	Phil Faustini		Rod Snellenberger	Todd Dart				Jay Naze
1997	Shawn Olson		Sean Jerovetz	Eugene Gregorich				Kevin Jandrin
1996	Gregg Siebold		Robert Waechter	Eugene Gregorich				Aaron Thornton
1995	Dave Bouche		Jerry Wenzel	Eugene Gregorich				Rick LeMieux
1994	Rick Lemmens		Charlie Kroll	Eugene Gregorich				Bernie Reinhardt
1993	Jason Geyer		John Gregorich	Darrell Massart				Paul LeBotte

== Busch Shootout winners ==
Past Busch Shootout Winners (2017–2025)
Year	Street Stock	Sport Modified	Stock Car
2026	Dave DeGrave		
2025	Dave DeGrave		Brett Wenzel
2024	Garret Geyer	Craig Dorner	
2023	Presely Harrington	Craig Dorner	Troy Muench
2022	Dave DeGrave	Cody Rass	Rob Waechter jr.
2021	Troy Muench	Mike Plate	Brett Wenzel
2020	Season canceled due to COVID-19		
2019	Dave DeGrave	Troy DeGrave	Brett Wenzel
2018	Dave DeGrave	Randy Lemieux Jr.	Brett Wenzel
2017	Dave DeGrave	Craig Dorner	Jamie Suchocki

== Hall of Fame ==
The Hill Raceway Track Hall of Fame Inductees
Year	Inductee
2014	Irv Ettien
2014	Dale Knudson
2014	Fritz Van Duyse
2014	Clyde LeMieux Sr.
2014	Les Sternard
2014	Joe Haferkorn
2014	Tom Wagner
2014	Butch Georgenson
2015	Wally Massart
2015	Darrell Massart
2015	Reggie Cochart
2015	Jerry Jonet
2015	George Henkel
2017	Gregg Curzon
2017	Brad Anderegg
2017	John Gregorich
2018	Pat Temple
2018	Rick Ledvina
2018	Carolyn Tordeur
2018	Eugene Gregorich
2019	Bobby Schmelzer
2019	Mike Schmelzer
2019	George Schmelzer
2019	Jason Geyer
2019	Lynn Wolfgram
2021	Randy Guelette
2021	Augie Derenne
2021	Charlie Kroll
2022	Kevin Sternard
2022	Roger "Red" Isaacson
2022	Ray LeMieux
2022	Craig Paque
2023	Aaron Thornton
2023	Bryan "Woody" Wodack
2023	Mary Wodack
2023	Matt Junio
2024	Harvey Trader
2024	Tim McCormick
2024	Gary "Tuner" Nault
2024	Armand "Chum" Nault
2025	Randy LeMieux Sr.
2025	Rick LeMieux
2025	Clyde LeMieux Jr.
2026	Bernie Reinhardt
2026	Wayne "Big Daddy" Grosbeier
2026	Von Eytcheson
