= Impact Survival Series =

American stock car enduro

- Category: Stock cars
- Country: United States
- Inaugural season: 2009
- Drivers' champion: Justin Schelitzche (2021)
- Official website: Impact Survival Series

Impact Survival Series is an American stock car enduro series based in the Upper Midwest of the United States. The annual circuit typically includes stops at race tracks in Wisconsin and Michigan.

== History ==
Founded in 2009 by promoter Matt Rowe, Impact Survival Series features enduro races consisting of 150–300 laps.

ISS held their first race on September 9, 2009, at Shawano Speedway. Jay Welsing was the winner and lone driver to complete all 150 laps.

Madison International Speedway is host to one of the signature races of the ISS season in the annual 2.4 Hours of Le MIS.

== Race winners ==
Date	Race	Winner	Runner-up	Track	Cars entered
September 9, 2009	ISS 150 at Shawano	Jay Weising	Mark Minchenski	Shawano Speedway	85
October 3, 2009	ISS 300 at Jefferson	Kyle Stark	Todd Hebel	Jefferson Speedway	35
March 9, 2010	ISS 150 at Shawano	Greg Banker	Frank Calabrese	Shawano Speedway	77
May 29, 2010	ISS 300 at MIS	Duke Truttmann	Dave Beyer	Madison International Speedway	28
10/2010	ISS 300 at WIR	Jay Orr	Dan Harris	Wisconsin International Raceway	84
October 30, 2010	Creepy Classic 300	Todd Weising	Scott Leisner	151 Speedway	47
January 10, 2011	ISS 300 at WIR	Mike Loberger	Phil Lehl	Wisconsin International Raceway	68
February 9, 2011	ISS 150 at Shawano	Jay Weising	Todd Weising	Shawano Speedway	64
April 16, 2011	ISS 300 at 151	Gary Stark	Chris Fifarek	151 Speedway	62
May 28, 2011	ISS 200 at MIS	Dave Beyer	Jay Orr	Madison International Speedway	46
October 29, 2011	Creepy Classic 300	Eddie Muenster	Frank Calabrese	151 Speedway	80
April 14, 2012	ISS 300 at Jefferson	Frank Calabrese	Scott Blanke	Jefferson Speedway	51
August 31, 2012	ISS 150 at Shawano	Andy Cleczka	Scott Leisner	Shawano Speedway	73
September 29, 2012	ISS 300 at WIR	Dave Beyer	Frank Calabrese	Wisconsin International Raceway	63
October 27, 2012	Creepy Classic 300	Shaun Scheel	Eddie Muenster	State Park Speedway	57
April 13, 2013	Teaser 200	Kyle Stark	Jay Orr	State Park Speedway	35
April 27, 2013	All Star Repairables 300	Jacob Balk	Frank Calabrese	Jefferson Speedway	51
September 4, 2013	Muenster Shell 150	Jacob Balk	Frank Calabrese	Shawano Speedway	68
October 6, 2013	Ken's Sports 300	Phil Lehl	Scott Blanke	Wisconsin International Raceway	59
October 31, 2013	Creepy Classic 300	Joe Tacheny	Josh Opper	State Park Speedway	72
May 13, 2014	All Star Repairables 300	Kyle Stark	Phil Lehl	Jefferson Speedway	53
August 4, 2014	Door County Fair 150	Jay Orr	Dan VanPay	Thunder Hill Speedway	29
October 4, 2014	ISS 300 at WIR	Mike Loberger	Dave Beyer	Wisconsin International Raceway	63
October 25, 2014	Creepy Classic 300	Joe Tacheny	Frank Calabrese	State Park Speedway	67
January 1, 2015	Chill Chaser 200	Dave Beyer	Todd Tacheny	141 Speedway	34
April 14, 2015	ISS 300 at Jefferson	Jacob Balk	Kyle Stark	Jefferson Speedway	67
July 18, 2015	ISS 150 at Luxemburg	Jeremy Czrapata	Frank Calabrese	Luxemburg Speedway	42
August 9, 2015	ISS 150 at Shawno	Scott Blanke	Brandon Bloomer	Shawano Speedway	60
October 3, 2015	ISS 300 at WIR	Blake Doweiler	Jeremy Czarapata	Wisconsin International Raceway	56
October 24, 2015	Creepy Classic 300	Blake Doweiler	Carl Benn	State Park Speedway	70
April 16, 2016	ISS 300 at Jefferson	Joe Tacheny	Todd Tacheny	Jefferson Speedway	68
July 17, 2016	ISS 150 at Luxemburg	Jay Orr	Justin Juranitch	Luxemburg Speedway	60
September 5, 2016	ISS 150 at Shawano	Todd Tacheny	Jay Orr	Shawano Speedway	66
October 4, 2016	ISS 300 at WIR	Jay Orr	Frank Calabrese	Wisconsin International Raceway	61
October 22, 2016	Creepy Classic 300	Zach Shelhaas	Eddie Muenster	State Park Speedway	81
January 1, 2017	Chill Chaser 200	Braison Bennett	Kyle Stark	141 Speedway	62
April 15, 2017	Spring Has Sprung 300	Brian Adams	Blake Dorweiler	Jefferson Speedway	77
July 22, 2017	ISS 150 at Luxemburg	Todd Tacheny	Frank Calabrase	Luxemburg Speedway	70
September 30, 2017	ISS 300 at WIR	Kyle Stark	Brian Adams	Wisconsin International Raceway	82
October 28, 2017	Creepy Classic 300	Todd Tacheny	Travis Volm	State Park Speedway	96
January 1, 2018	Chill Chaser 200	Mike Borth	Gary Stark	141 Speedway	82
April 22, 2018	Spring Has Sprung 300	Kyle Stark	Frank Calabrase	Jefferson Speedway	90
May 27, 2018	ISS 200 at Gravity Park	Todd Tacheny	Ridge Oien	Gravity Park Speedway	67
July 21, 2018	ISS 150 at Luxemburg	Kyle Stark	Todd Tacheny	Luxemburg Speedway	70
August 25, 2018	ISS 300 at Norway	Steve Doherty	Kyle Stark	Norway Speedway	58
September 29, 2018	ISS 300 at WIR	Ridge Oien	Justin Schelitzche	Wisconsin International Raceway	91
October 27, 2018	Creepy Classic 300	Kyle Stark	Justin Schelitzche	State Park Speedway	120
January 1, 2019	Chill Chaser 200	George Seliger	Scott Blanke	141 Speedway	85
March 16, 2019	Lucky Leprechaun 300	Jay Orr	Devon Dixon	Dells Raceway Park	92
April 13, 2019	Spring Has Sprung 300	Kyle Stark	Jay Orr	Jefferson Speedway	116
May 26, 2019	ISS 200 at Gravity Park	Todd Tacheny	Troy Tuma	Gravity Park Speedway	95
July 13, 2019	ISS 150 at Luxemburg	Jake Balk	Jason Kurth	Luxemburg Speedway	67
August 24, 2019	ISS 300 at Norway	Steve Doherty	Phil Lehl	65	
September 28, 2019	ISS 300 at WIR	Justin Schelitzche	Jay Orr	Wisconsin International Raceway	84
October 26, 2019	Creepy Classic 300	Brody Rivest	Todd Tacheny	State Park Speedway	119
May 24, 2020	ISS 150 at Gravity Park	Bob Voigt	Scott Blanke	Gravity Park Speedway	73
June 21, 2020	ISS 300 at Golden Sands	Mike Heidmann	Kyle Ambroziak	Golden Sands Speedway	85
July 25, 2020	Seymour Action 150	Lee Beyer	Troy Tuma	Seymour Speedway	67
September 7, 2020	2.4 Hours of Les MIS	Scott Vetter	Jamie Shelley	Madison International Speedway	61
October 3, 2020	ISS 300 at WIR	Garrett Strachota	Jay Orr	Wisconsin International Raceway	82
October 31, 2020	Creepy Classic 300	Brody Rivest	Ridge Oien	State Park Speedway	98
January 1, 2021	Chill Chaser 200	Todd Tacheny	Kyle Stark	Tomah Sparta Speedway	86
March 20, 2021	Lucky Leprechaun 300	Eric Breitenfeldt	Justin Schelitzche	Golden Sands Speedway	92
April 17, 2021	Spring Has Sprung 300	Justin Schelitzche	Kyle Stark	Jefferson Speedway	83
May 30, 2021	ISS 150 at Gravity Park	Jake Balk	Jason Kurth	Gravity Park Speedway	69
July 24, 2021	ISS 150 at TNT	Frank Calabrase	Dale Brandt	TNT Speedway	51
September 6, 2021	2.4 Hours of Les MIS	Justin Schelitzche	Luke Geisler	Madison International Speedway	64
October 2, 2021	ISS 300 at WIR	Justin Schelitzche	Isaac Bray	Wisconsin International Raceway	69
October 30, 2021	Creepy Classic 300	George Seliger	Brandon Ricker	State Park Speedway	99
January 1, 2022	Chill Chaser 200	Scott Blanke	Isaac Bray	Tomah Sparta Speedway	63
April 9, 2022	Spring Has Sprung 300	Kyle Stark	George Seliger	Jefferson Speedway	74
May 14, 2022	Lucky Leprechaun 300	Justin Schelitzche	Brandon Riedner	Golden Sands Speedway	68
May 29, 2022	ISS 150 at Gravity Park	Jeremy Czarapata	Scott Blanke	Gravity Park Speedway	66
August 27, 2022	ISS 300 at Norway	Justin Schelitzche	John Wickesberg	Norway Speedway	69
October 1, 2022	Rocktoberfest 300	Karl Genett	Justin Schelitzche	Dells Raceway Park	69
October 29, 2022	Creepy Classic 300	Isaac Bray	Justin Schelitzche	State Park Speedway	75
January 1, 2023	Chill Chaser 200	Kyle Stark	Adam Hayden	Tomah Sparta Speedway	63
April 15, 2023	Spring Has Sprung 300	Jake Balk	Adam Hayden	Jefferson Speedway	81
May 27, 2023	ISS 150 at Gravity Park	Jake Wickesberg	Jerry Bowen	Gravity Park Speedway	61
July 21, 2023	Ring of Fire 300	Isaac Bray	Kyle Stark	Madison International Speedway	54
August 26, 2023	ISS 300 at Norway	Eric Breitenfeldt	Todd Tacheny	Norway Speedway	60
September 30, 2023	ISS 300 at Golden Sands	Brian Adams	Davey Pennel	Golden Sands Speedway	77
October 28, 2023	Creepy Classic 300	Justin Schelitzche	Jake Wickesberg	State Park Speedway	94
April 13, 2024	Spring Has Sprung 300	Troy Tuma	Steve Doherty	Jefferson Speedway	78
May 28, 2024	ISS 150 at Chateau	Nate Coopman	Nick Von Ruden	Chateau Speedway	59
July 26, 2024	Ring of Fire 300	Davey Pennel	Jake Wickesberg	Madison International Speedway	57
August 24, 2024	ISS 300 at Norway	Troy Tuma	Todd Tachney	Norway Speedway	59
September 21, 2024	ISS 150 at 141	Phil Lehl	Jake Wickesberg	141 Speedway	60
October 12, 2024	Creepy Classic 300	Kyle Stark	Eric Breitenfeldt	State Park Speedway	105
October 26, 2024	ISS 300 at Golden Sands	Eric Breitenfeldt	Todd Tacheny	Golden Sands Speedway91	91
January 1, 2025	Chill Chaser 200	Justin Schelitzche	Tanner Chadderdon	Tomah Sparta Speedway	59
April 5, 2025	Spring Has Sprung 300	Jack Barta	Karter Stark	Jefferson Speedway	64
April 26, 2025	ISS 300 at Golden Sands	Adam Hayden	Mike Heidmann	Golden Sands Speedway	71
May 31, 2025	ISS 150 at Kasson	Davey Pennel	Frank Calabrase	Dodge County Speedway	45
July 19, 2025	Eager Beaver 150	Karter Stark	Brody Rivest	Beaver Dam Raceway	76
August 23, 2025	ISS 300 at Norway	Kyle Ansolabehere	Adam Hayden	Norway Speedway	52
September 20, 2025	Tumanator 300	Phil Lehl	Frank Calabrase	WIR and 141 Speedway	61
October 25, 2025	Creepy Classic 300	Jack Barta	Adam Hayden	Golden Sands Speedway	77
