= Boone Speedway =

Dirt oval raceway in Boone, Iowa, U.S.

Coordinates: 42.032°N 93.876°W

Boone Speedway, also known as “Iowa’s Action Track", is a 1/3-mile high-banked dirt oval raceway located in Boone, Iowa. Races are held on Saturday nights sanctioned by the IMCA. Regular events include IMCA Modifieds, IMCA Stock Cars, IMCA Northern Sport Modifieds, IMCA Hobby Stocks, and IMCA Mod Lites. The track's weekly races can be viewed on IMCA.tv streaming platform.

== History ==
Boone Speedway opened as a 3/8th mile high banked dirt track in 1967 and was built by Vern Carman. The track was built due to the limitations and small size of the Dayton track that Vern promoted and was closed in 1967. The first documented race was The Grand National on July 23, 1967, with a $4,000 purse. Boone ran weekly races as well as several special races annually such as The Grand Nationals, the Tri-State 100, the Deery Brothers IMCA Late Model Series, IMCA Super Nationals, and Hawkeye 50. Ramo Stott, a former ARCA champion and Daytona 500 pole sitter competed at Boone in the 1970s.

Throughout the 1990s and early 2000s numerous upgrades were made to the track. These included upgraded walls along the front and back stretch, increased catwalks and pit side grandstands, a new leader board, and safety enhancements. In addition, a jet dryer was purchased which is claimed to be the only jet dryer in dirt track racing. Over the years a number of John Deere tractors have been purchased to prepare the track. This has been dubbed farming the track which has become popularized with the playing of "Green Acres" during the prep and through the sale of track merchandise.

== IMCA Super Nationals ==
During the first week of September, Boone Speedway holds the Speedway Motor's IMCA Super Nationals racing event. Many of the top drivers from across the United States come to Boone to compete in the weeklong event. The event is the crown jewel of the series. Making the final feature is considered a career highlight. In 2022 995 cars registered for the race. The events are broadcast on the IMCA.tv.

The IMCA Super Nationals were first held in Vinton, Iowa in 1983. After moving to different tracks the Super Nationals found a permanent home at the Boone Speedway. Today the race is a weeklong featuring the IMCA Sport Compacts, IMCA Hobby Stocks, IMCA Northern Sport Mods, IMCA Stock Cars, IMCA Late Models, and IMCA Modifieds. From 1989 to 2008 the IMCA Sprint Cars also competed in the event.

Besides racing the Super Nationals also feature a Cornhole Tourney. Previously there were a number of other events including a golf tournament, pit crew competition, and several unofficial activities. One of the most well known among racers is the engine auction following Saturday's championships. The auction total for each class gets dispersed to each driver who started the feature. The winning driver gets a new IMCA legal engine donated by Karl Performance in Des Moines.

== Hawkeye 50/100 ==
The Hawkeye 50/100 is a World of Outlaws Late Model Series race that was scheduled to begin in 2020. Due to the COVID-19 pandemic the inaugural race was canceled. The initial event was a two-day event held April 30 - May 1, 2021. This two-day event featured the WoO Late Models, IMCA SportMods, IMCA Stock Cars, and IMCA Modifieds. The initial event had "Twin Hawk" features for the late models paying $2,500 to the winner of each race. The Saturday race was the highest paying in Boone history with $1,500 to start and $30,000 to win. In 2022 the event was downsized to one day due to shortages of both dirt racing tires and racing fuel. This created a one-day 50- lap event with a $20,000 purse. The support class for the second event was the IMCA Northern Sport Mods.
