= Barona Raceway =

Motorsport facility in Lakeside, California, United States

- Location: 1750 Wildcat Canyon Road and 1754 Wildcat Canyon Road, Lakeside, CA
- Coordinates: 32.9800°N 116.8367°W

Drag Strip
- Surface: Paved
- Length: 0.201 km (.125 mi)

Oval
- Surface: Clay
- Length: 0.40 km (.25 mi)

Barona Raceway (originally called Barona Speedway Park) is a motorsport facility located on the Barona Indian Reservation in Lakeside, California, United States. Barona Raceway features a 1/4-mile clay oval track known as Barona Speedway and a 1/8-mile dragstrip known as Barona Drags.

== Barona Speedway ==
Opened in April 1994, the Speedway originally was a 1/6-mile dirt oval track which expanded in 1999 to a semi-banked 1/4-mile clay oval which regularly hosts IMCA racing, figure-eight events and drag racing.

== Barona Drags ==
Originally, Barona 1/8-mile Drags started as a sand drag strip but was later converted to an NHRA-sanctioned paved 1/8-mile drag strip.
