= Enduro race =

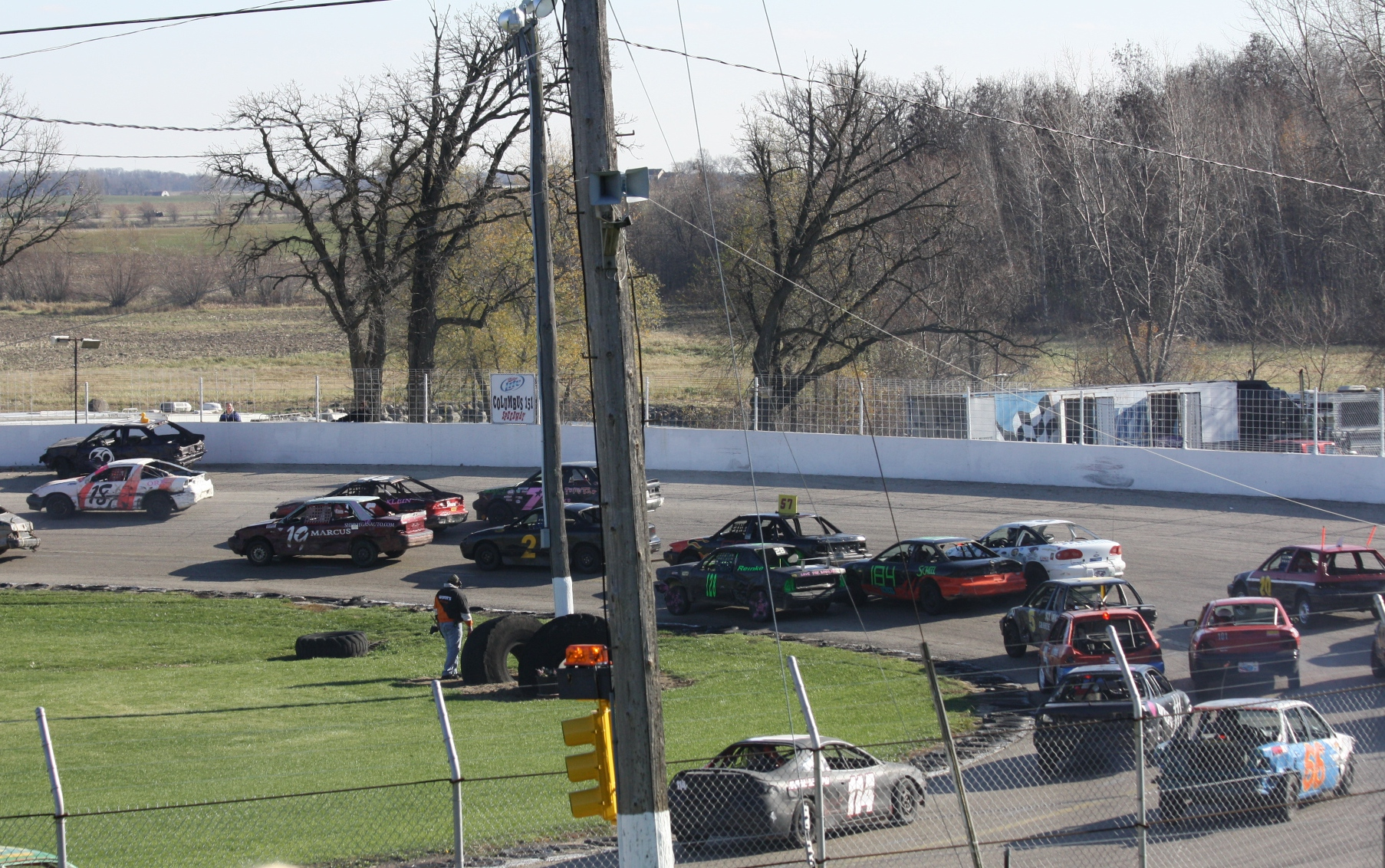
Four-cylinder cars racing in the Impact Survival Series

An enduro race is an inexpensive type of automobile racing that takes place mostly on oval tracks. Enduro takes its name from "Endurance racing" since it consists of hundreds of laps around the oval.

== Vehicle ==
Enduro racing involves stock based cars that have their interior and side or rear windows removed but are mostly stock mechanically. A driver is disqualified if the post-race inspection finds that their auto has major racing enhancements. Some enduros, often called 'jalopy enduros,' feature cars rescued from a wrecking yard and repaired to a barely running condition solely for the purpose of the race. In this case, the prize may be awarded to the last car standing, if all the other competitors break down during the event.

Enduro racing is sometimes divided into two classes: big-car and small-car. Big-car races feature full-size (usually American) cars with larger 6- and 8-cylinder engines, while small-car races feature mid-size to sub-compact (often Japanese) 4-cylinder makes and models.

== History ==
The first enduro stock car race in the United States was held at the high-banked, asphalt 1/4 mile Monadnock Speedway in Winchester, New Hampshire in the mid-1980s. It was the brainchild of track announcer John Berti. Berti sat down with the owners of the speedway, Larry Cirillo and Fred Parfumi telling them of the concept of enduro racing. They bought into the idea immediately, encouraging Berti to come up with the rules and it began a few weeks later with 152 cars showing up at the first event.

Enduros were run on a monthly basis and paid good purses with $1,000 going to the winner. The races were long-distance affairs lasting 150 laps and were scored using a flop clock with each competitor having a scorer in the grandstands under the control of one head scoring official who kept things honest. It was exciting with much crashing and banging. The cars were slightly better than demo derby cars, had to remain stock, interiors removed with a rollbar, and bumpers had to be chained on. This type of racing really took off as it was a great, low-cost way for amateur racers to be able to take to the racetrack.

Other tracks in the Northeast began to pick up on it, but to many of the enduro racers and fans Monadnock Speedway was revered as "The Enduro Capital" because of the way the races were run and the rules were so tight. It was the way to beat the high cost of stock car racing and it grew nationwide.

The race is not stopped except for an emergency or if the track is completely blocked. At that point the driver is removed from the car, the car remains where it was as an obstacle, and the race returns to green.

== See also ==
- ChampCar Endurance Series
- Impact Survival Series
- National Auto Sport Association
- Sports Car Club of America
