= IMCA Sport Compact =

Class of racing cars

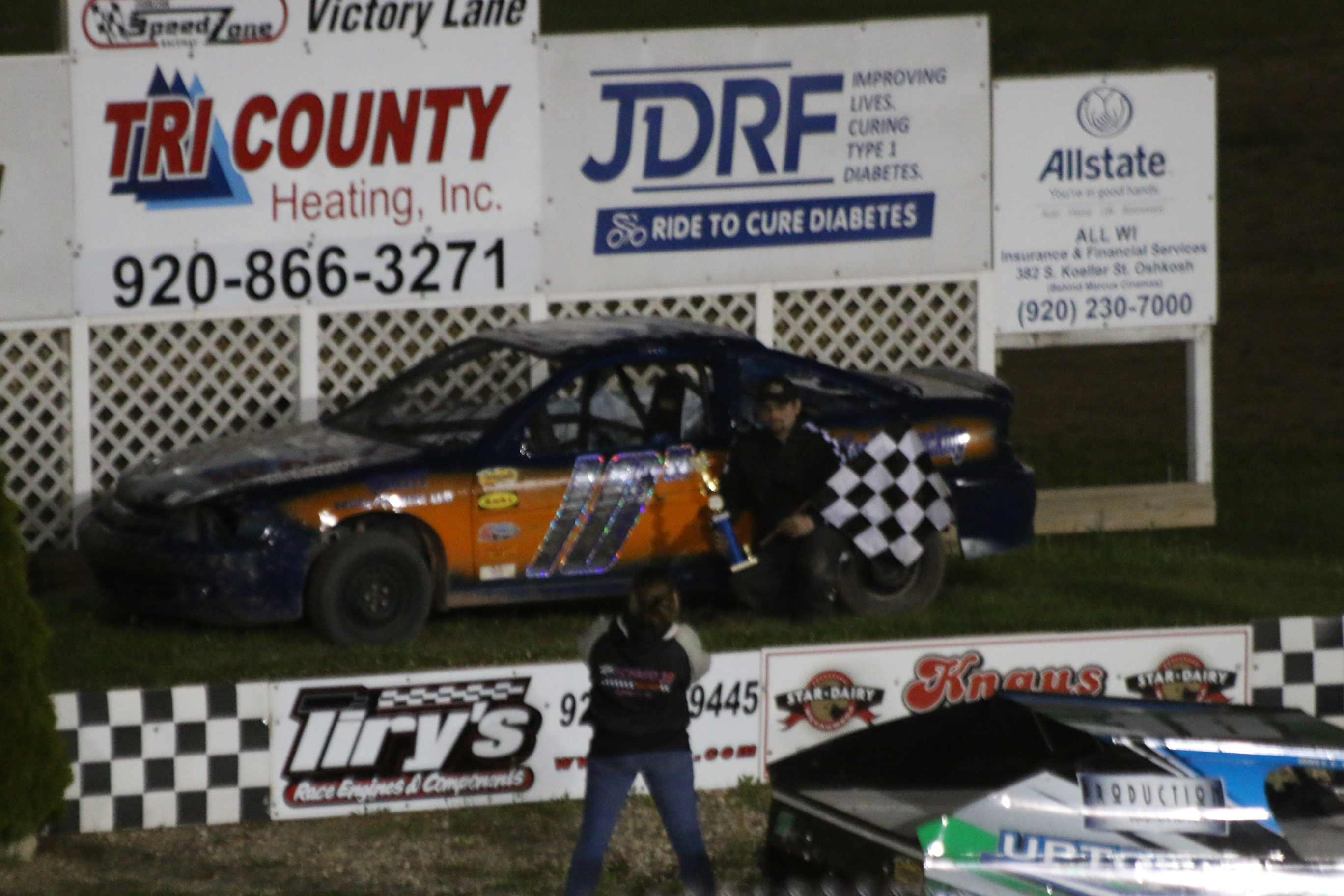
2017 IMCA Sport Compact national runner-up Mitch Meier

IMCA Sport Compact is IMCA's entry level class of racecars. They are found at IMCA tracks around the United States.

== History ==
The series was formed in 2006, when six tracks ran the class. A seventh track was added in 2007.

== Cars ==
IMCA Sport Compacts are three or four cylinder front-wheel drive compact cars. The car's interior is gutted for safety and weight reduction. Safety equipment such as a roll cage is installed. A $1500 claim rule is in effect.. Unlike other divisions where an engine can be claimed, in IMCA Sport Compact, the claim is for the entire car.

== Drivers ==
This division is designed for younger drivers, as the minimum age was 14.

== Past Point Champions ==
- 2024 - Kaylee Richards - Wymore, NE
- 2023 - Randy Martin - Springtown, TX
- 2022 - Nate Coopman - Mankato, MN
- 2021 - Caine Mahlberg - Dunlap, IA
- 2020 - Ramsey Meyer - Pierce, NE
- 2019 - Alex Dostal - Glencoe, MN
- 2018 - Ramsey Meyer - Pierce, NE
- 2017 - Dillon Richards - Beatrice, NE
- 2016 - Nate Coopman - Mankato, MN
- 2015 - Nate Coopman - Mankato, MN
- 2014 - Nate Coopman - Mankato, MN
- 2013 - Ramsey Meyer - Pierce, NE
- 2012 - Cameron Meyer - Pierce, NE
- 2011 - Nate Coopman - Mankato, MN
- 2010 - Darick Lamberson - Grand Island, NE
- 2009 - Garrett Rech - Davey, NE
- 2008 - Dan Rhiley - Bennington, NE
- 2007 - Jena Barthelmes - Marion, IA

== Past IMCA Super Nationals Champions ==
- 2020 - Rained Out
- 2019 - Nate Coopman - Mankato, MN
- 2018 Rained Out
- 2017 - Devin Jones - Mason City, IA
- 2016 - Josh Barnes - Keokuk, IA
- 2015 - Nate Coopman - Mankato, MN
- 2014 - Adam Gates - Marion, IA
- 2013 - Jacob Ellithorpe - Maquoketa, IA
- 2012 - Jacob Ellithorpe - Delmar, IA
- 2011 - Nathan Chandler - Norway, IA
