= 2003 in motorsport =

The following is an overview of the events of 2003 in motorsport including the major racing events, motorsport venues that were opened and closed during a year, championships and non-championship events that were established and disestablished in a year, and births and deaths of racing drivers and other motorsport people.

== Annual events ==
The calendar includes only annual major non-championship events or annual events that had significance separate from the championship. For the dates of the championship events see related season articles.

Date	Event	Ref
1–19 January	25th Dakar Rally	
1–2 February	41st 24 Hours of Daytona	
16 February	45th Daytona 500	
25 May	87th Indianapolis 500	
31 May-1 June	31st 24 Hours of Nurburgring	
1 June	61st Monaco Grand Prix	
24 May-7 June	85th Isle of Man TT	
14–15 June	71st 24 Hours of Le Mans	
26–27 July	55th 24 Hours of Spa	
3 August	26th Suzuka 8 Hours	
10 August	13th Masters of Formula 3	
12 October	46th Bob Jane T-Marts 1000	
16 November	50th Macau Grand Prix	
29–30 November	16th Race of Champions	

== Deaths ==
Date	Month	Name	Age	Nationality	Occupation	Note	Ref
10	March	Barry Sheene	52	British	Motorcycle racer	500cc Grand Prix motorcycle racing World champion (1976-1977).	
6	April	Daijiro Kato	26	Japanese	Motorcycle racer	250cc Grand Prix motorcycle racing World champion (2001)	

== See also ==
- List of 2003 motorsport champions
