= International Motor Contest Association =

United States racing sanctioning body

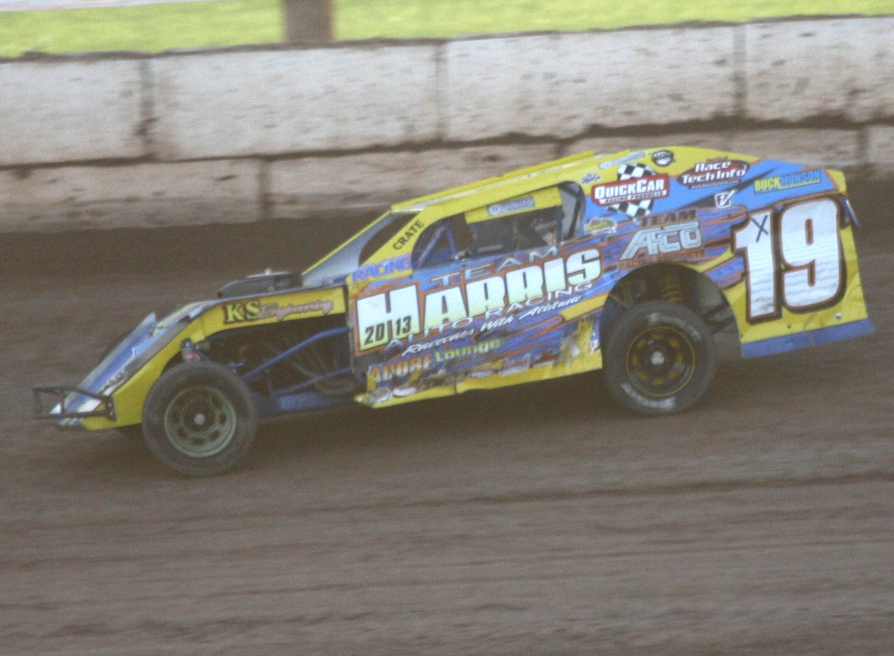
IMCA Modified

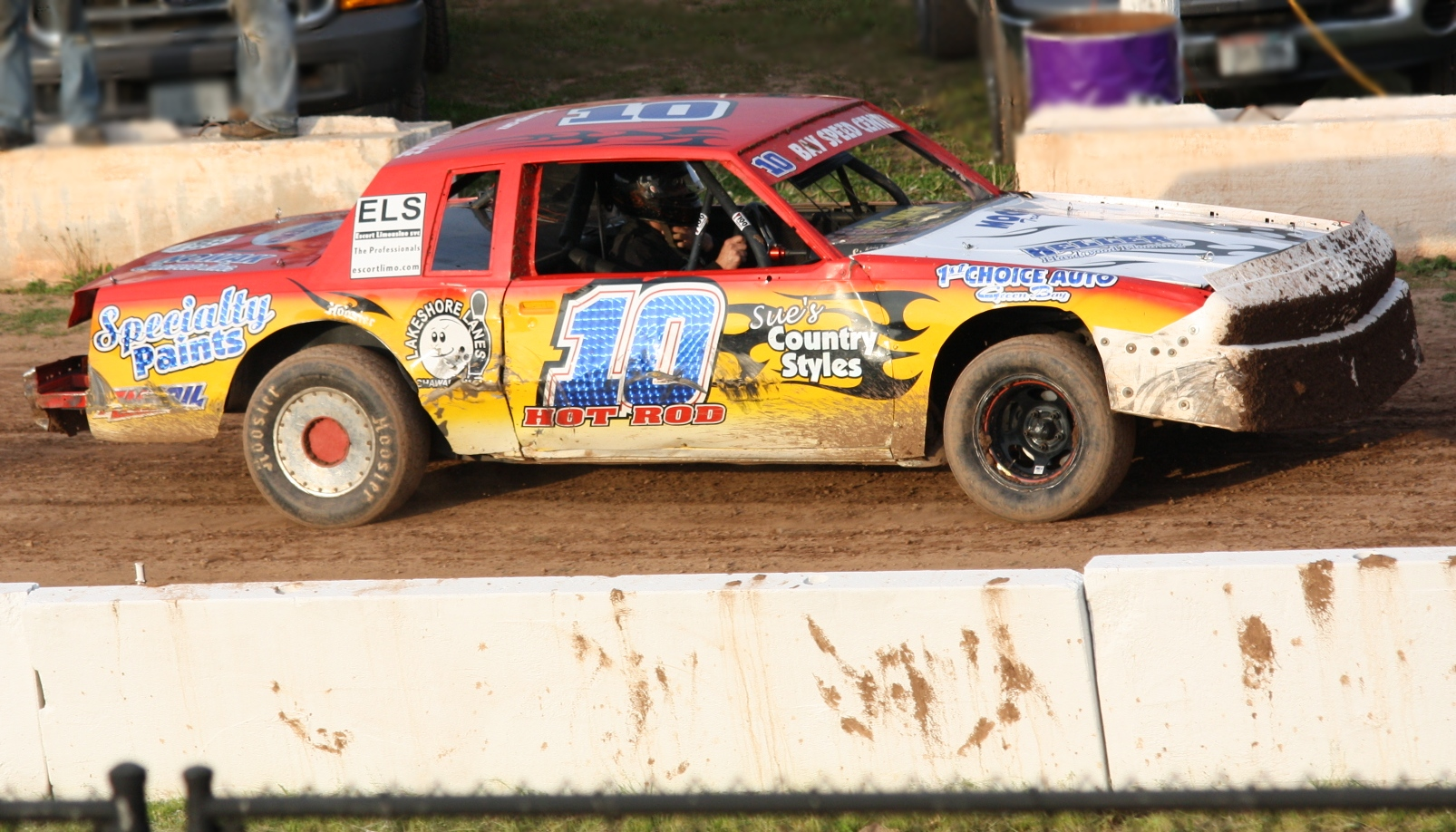
IMCA Stock Car

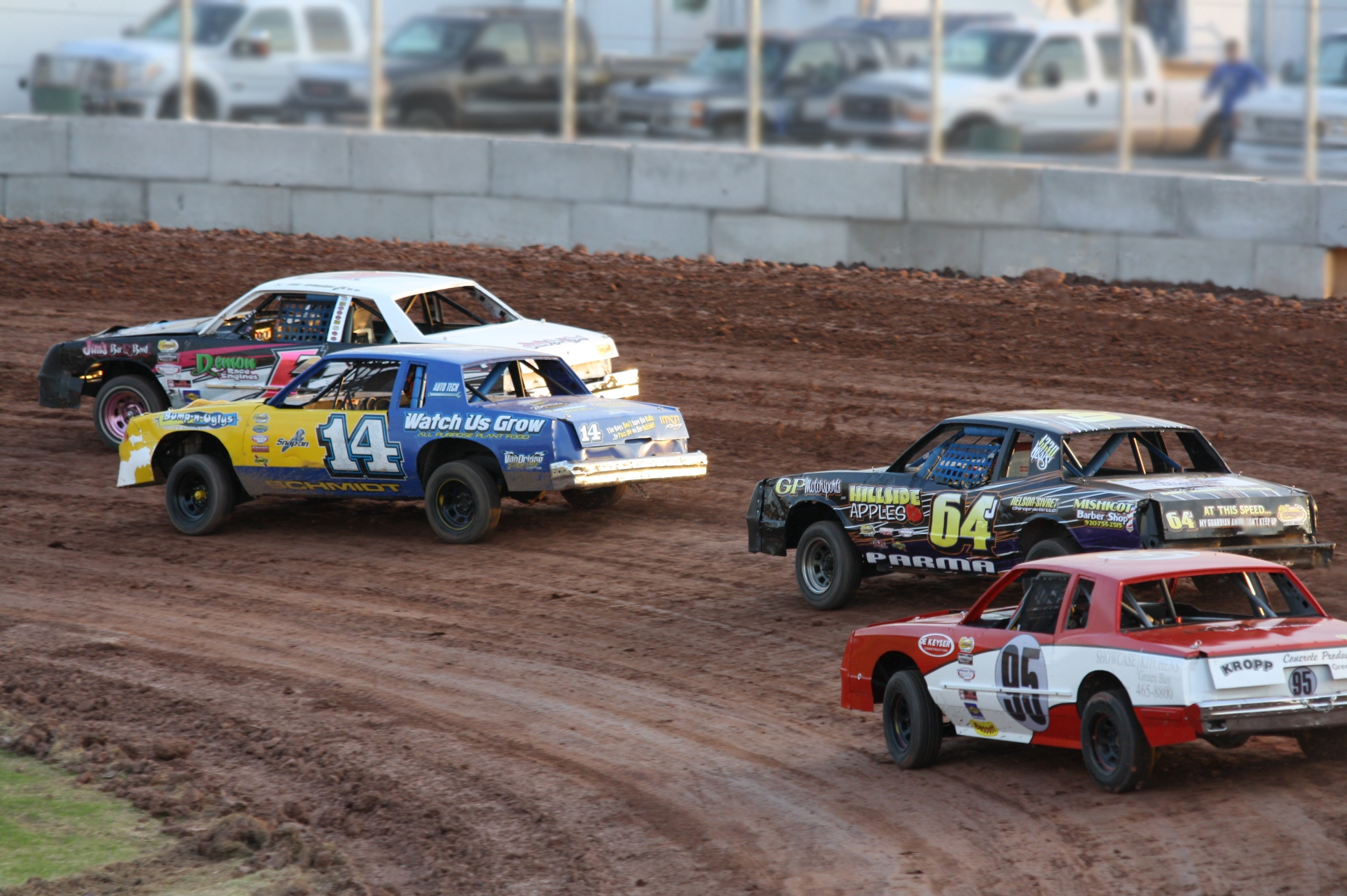
IMCA Hobby Stocks

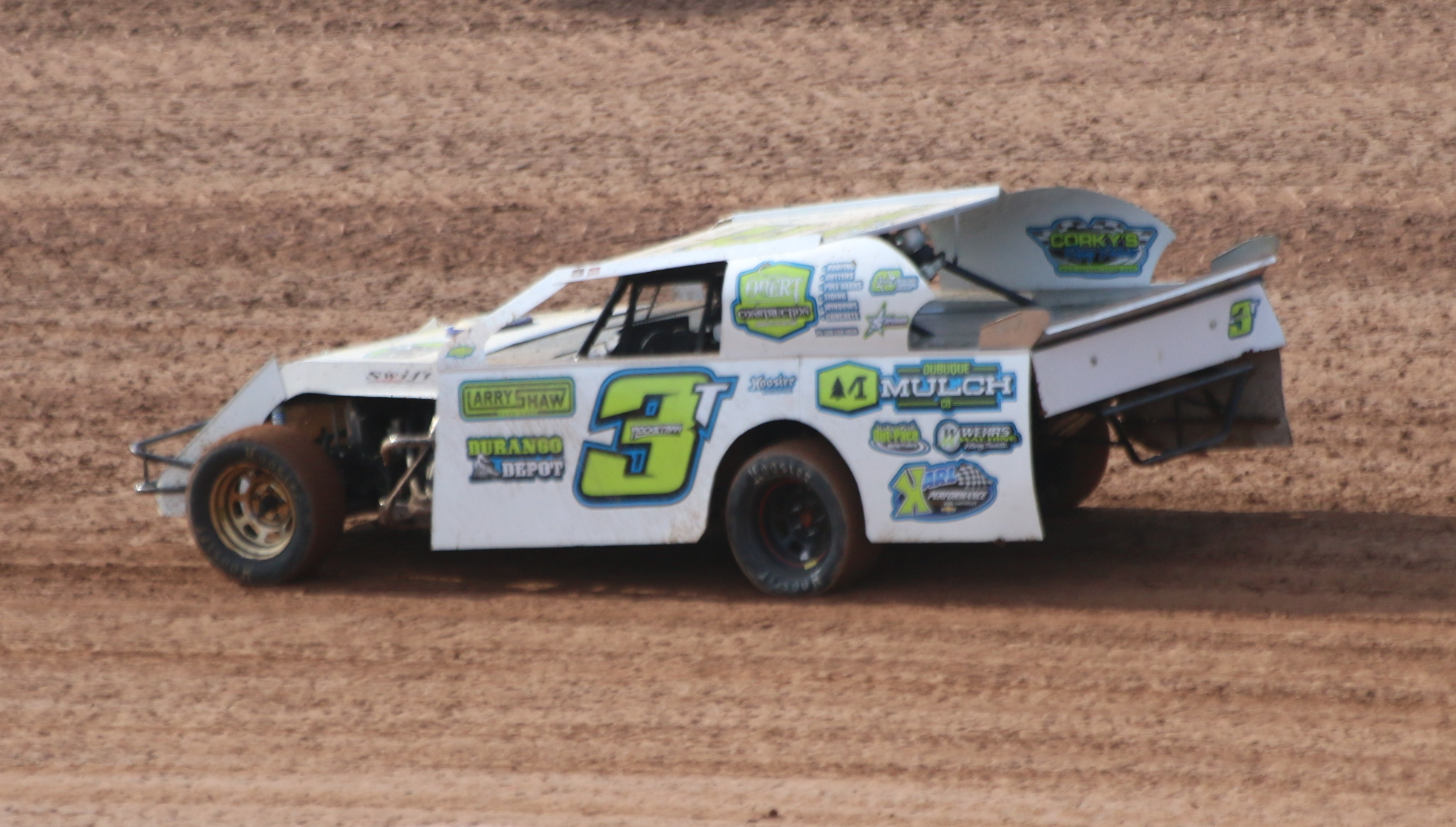
IMCA Northern SportMod

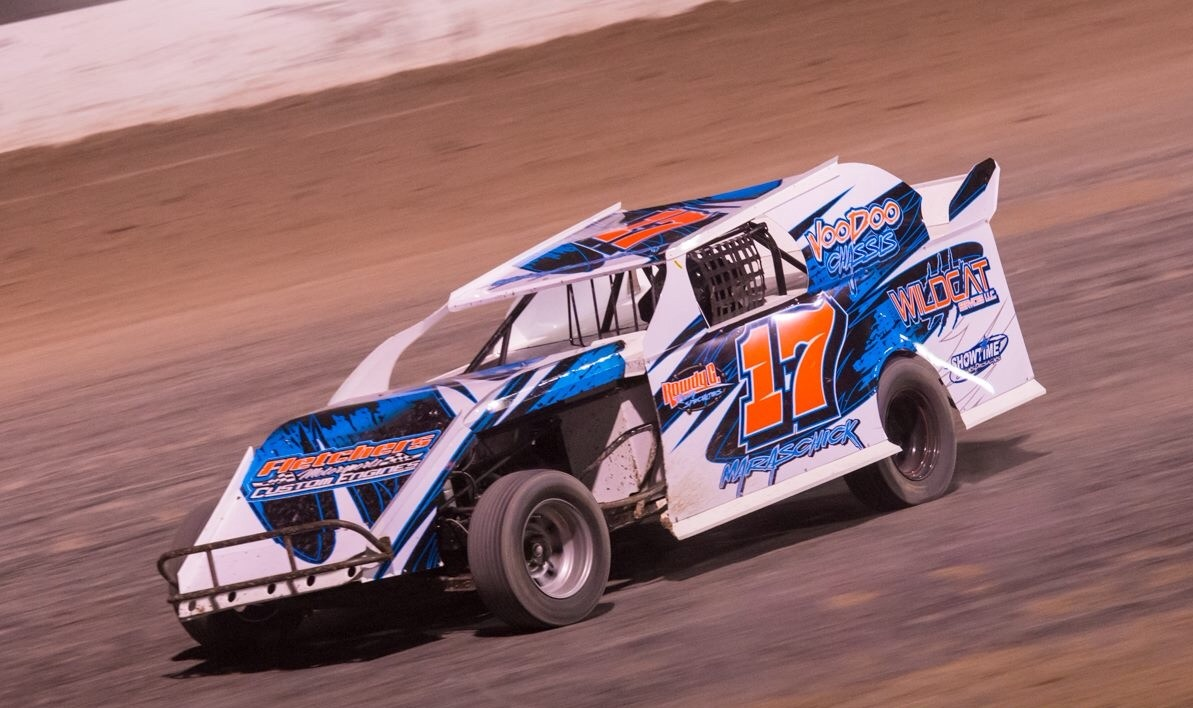
IMCA Southern SportMod

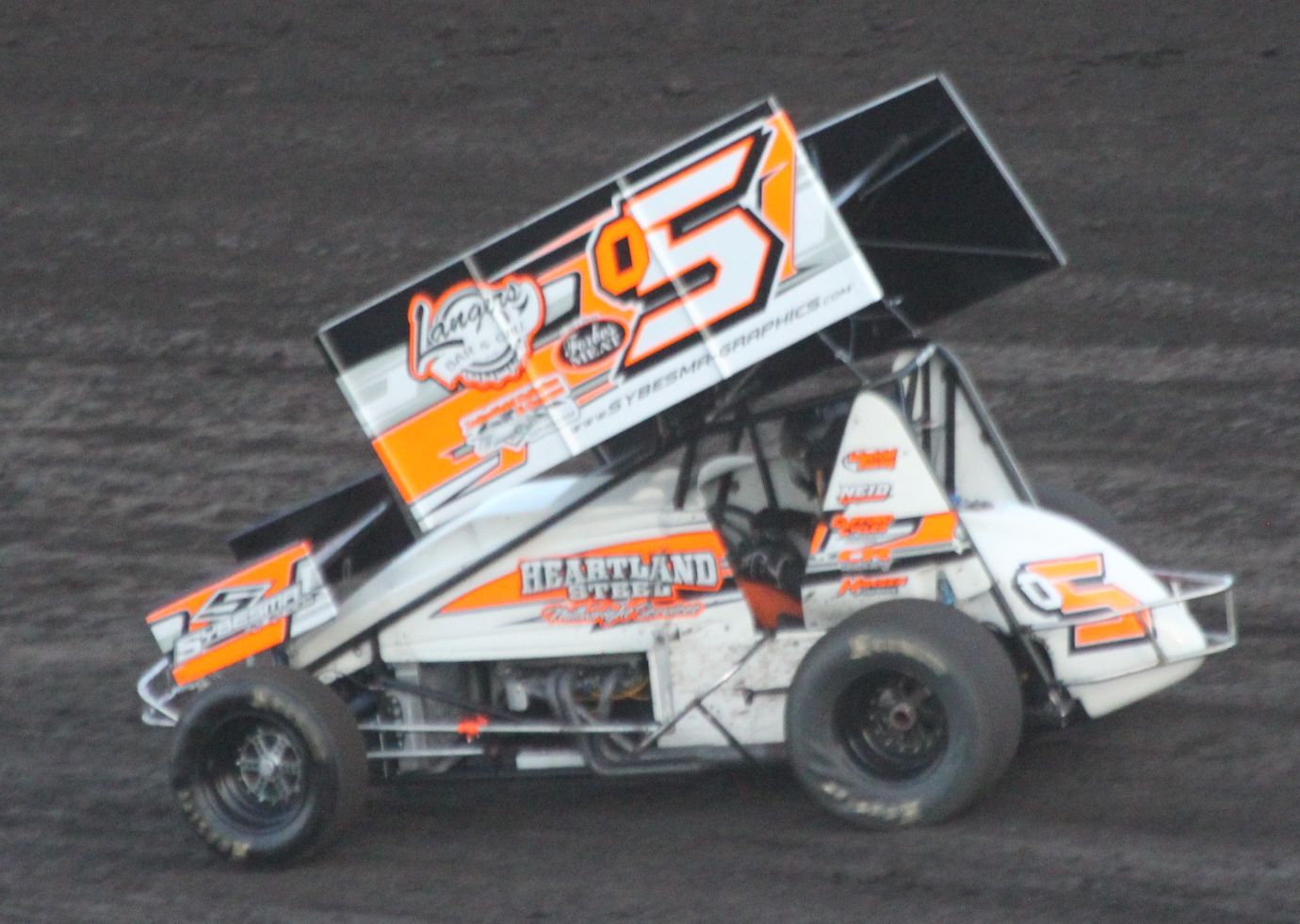
IMCA Sprint Car

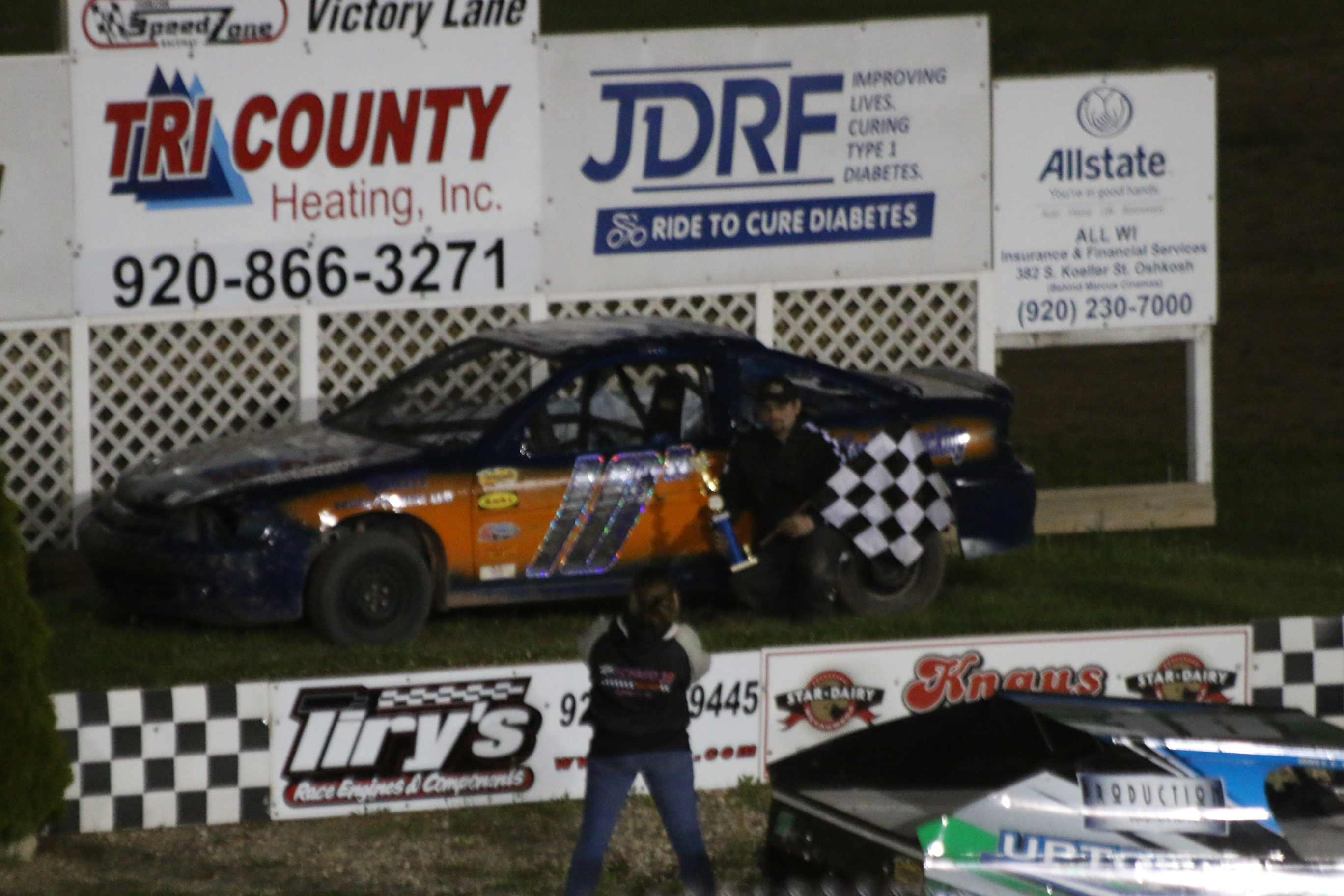
IMCA Sport Compact

The International Motor Contest Association (IMCA) is an auto racing sanctioning body for dirt track racing in the United States headquartered in Vinton, Iowa. Organized in 1915 by J. Alex Sloan, IMCA is the oldest active auto racing sanctioning body in the United States. IMCA features several classes and divisions of weekly racing in six geographical regions of the United States.

== Classes of cars sectioned by the IMCA ==
- IMCA Modified – Modified race cars with open wheels in the front and closed wheels in the back
- IMCA Latemodel – full-bodied late model race cars
- IMCA RaceSaver Sprint Car – traditional 305 non-winged and winged sprint cars
- IMCA Stock Car – full-bodied production stock cars
- IMCA Hobby Stock – 8-cylinder rear wheel drive entry-level division
- IMCA Northern Sport Modified – same as modifieds but with smaller engines and more restrictive rules
- IMCA Southern Sport Modified – Similar to Modified but with full GM Metric Frame
- IMCA Sport Compact – 4-cylinder front wheel drive stock cars
- IMCA STARS Mod Lites – 1000cc Modified

== Major races ==
The IMCA championships are held annually at the IMCA Super Nationals at Boone Speedway in Boone, Iowa. Another major race is the Harris Clash held at the Deer Creek Speedway in Spring Valley, Minnesota which was developed as a race with somewhat of an emphasis on chassis manufacturers. The IMCA Super Nationals is the biggest event held by IMCA. It happens once a year during the first week of September. This event has the most IMCA drivers in one event.

== History ==
The 1963 and 1964 IMCA champion, Dick Hutcherson, was not eligible for the 1965 NASCAR Grand National Series Rookie of the Year, which he won nine times and finished second in the standings; it was given to Sam McQuagg. NASCAR's rookie standards have since changed to being based only on the NASCAR Cup Series.

In 1979, IMCA held its first IMCA Modified race at the Benton County, Iowa Speedway.

== Images ==
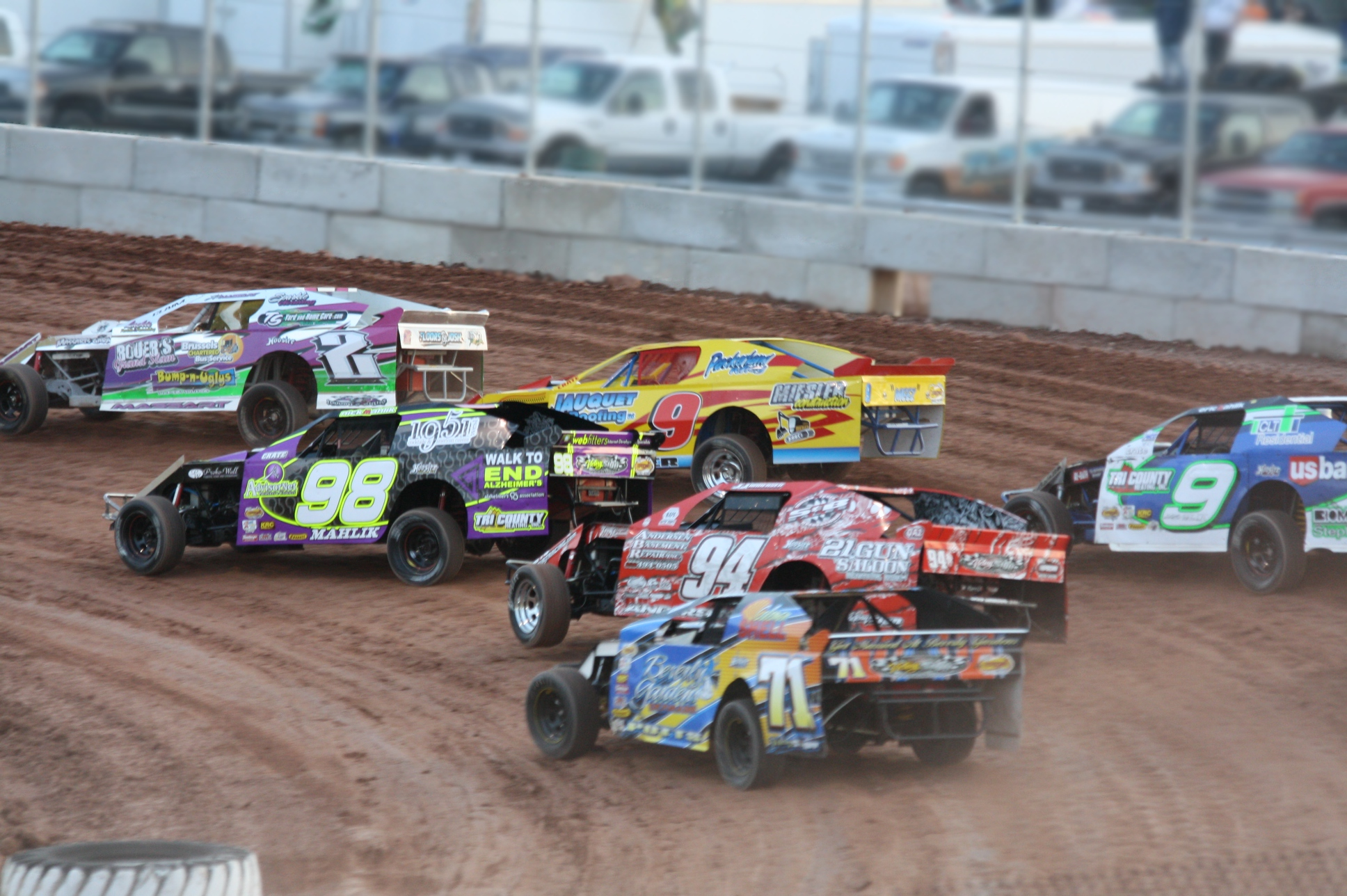
Northern Sport Modifieds

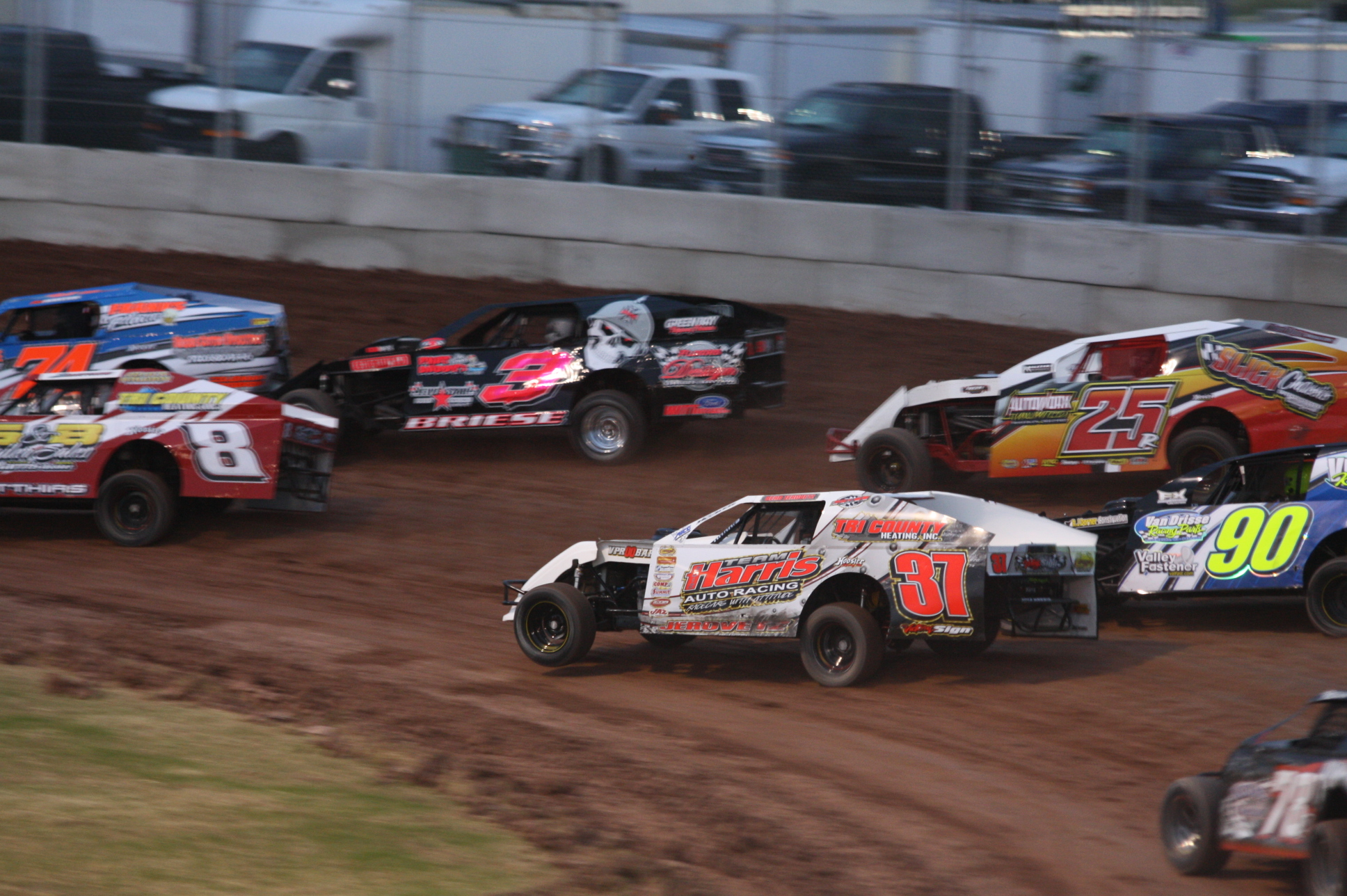
IMCA Modifieds

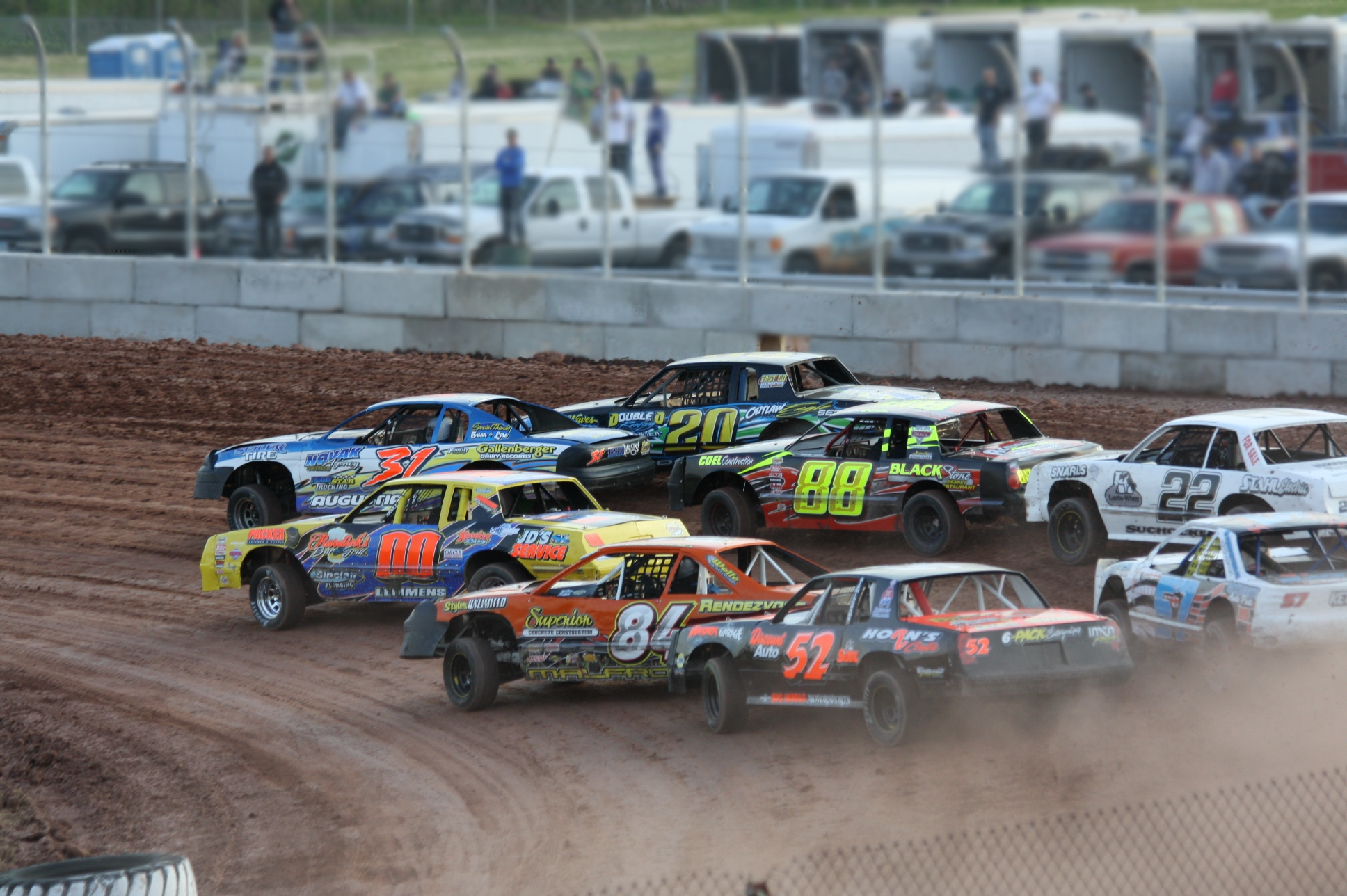
IMCA Stock Cars
