= IMCA Modified =

Type of modified car

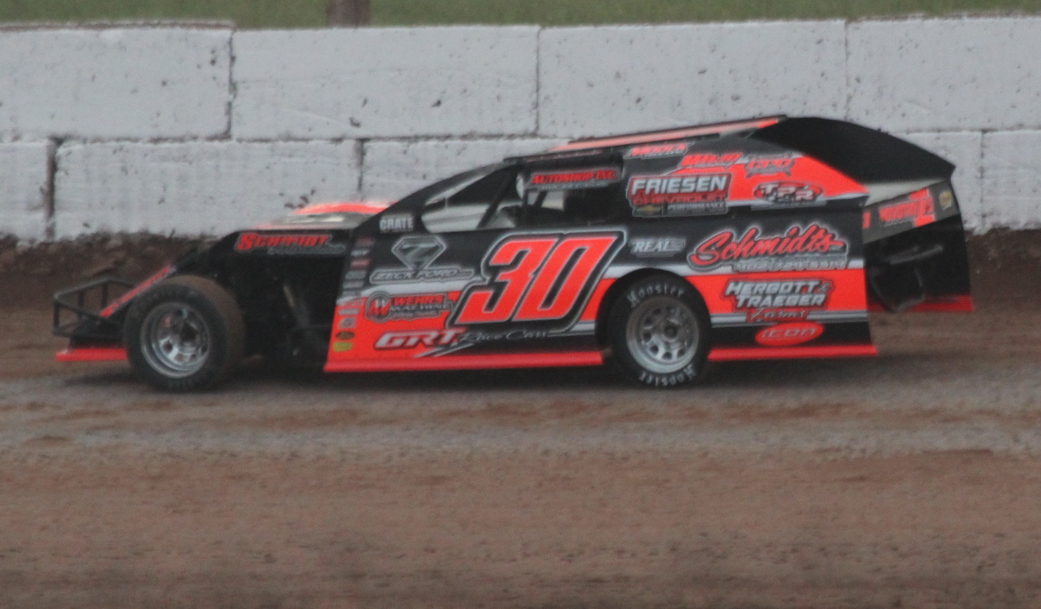
2016 champion Jordan Grabouski

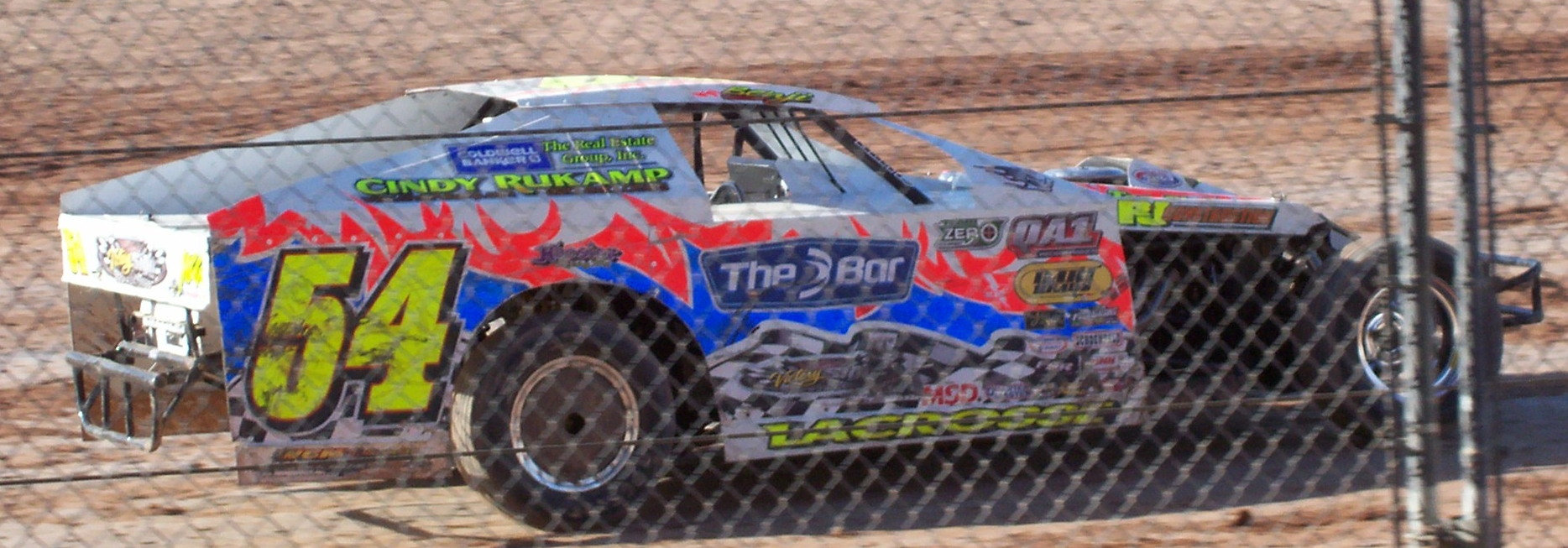
2006 IMCA Modified national champion Benji LaCrosse

IMCA Modified is the top modified division sanctioned by the International Motor Contest Association. The series began in 1979. It was designed to be a mid-level class between late models and hobby stocks. The first IMCA modified race was held at the Benton County, Iowa Speedway in 1979 on a 1/4 mile track.

The car bodies are hybrids of open wheel cars and stock cars. The front tires have no body around them like an open wheel car, and the back wheels have a body around them like a stock car. The series has an engine claim rule where any driver finishing fourth or lower and on the lead lap may claim a driver who finished ahead of him for a fee (originally $325, but now $1,050, or $100 and an exchange of engines; at the IMCA Super Nationals, the winner's engine is automatically claimed and sold at auction, where proceeds fund the top ten drivers' prize money), and because of the short length of the events, the tires used at the start must be used at the finish of the race ("one tire" rule) from specification supplier Continental AG.

== Sport modified ==
A sport modified division was created out of this division in the mid-2000s. This class features a similar chassis with lower horsepower, with the claim rule being $550. The division is divided into Northern and Southern Modified classes depending on the track's location in the United States. The Northern Modifieds feature restricted motors and chassis. The Southern Modifieds are purpose-built cars on 1978–87 General Motors G-Body chassis.

== List of national modified champions ==
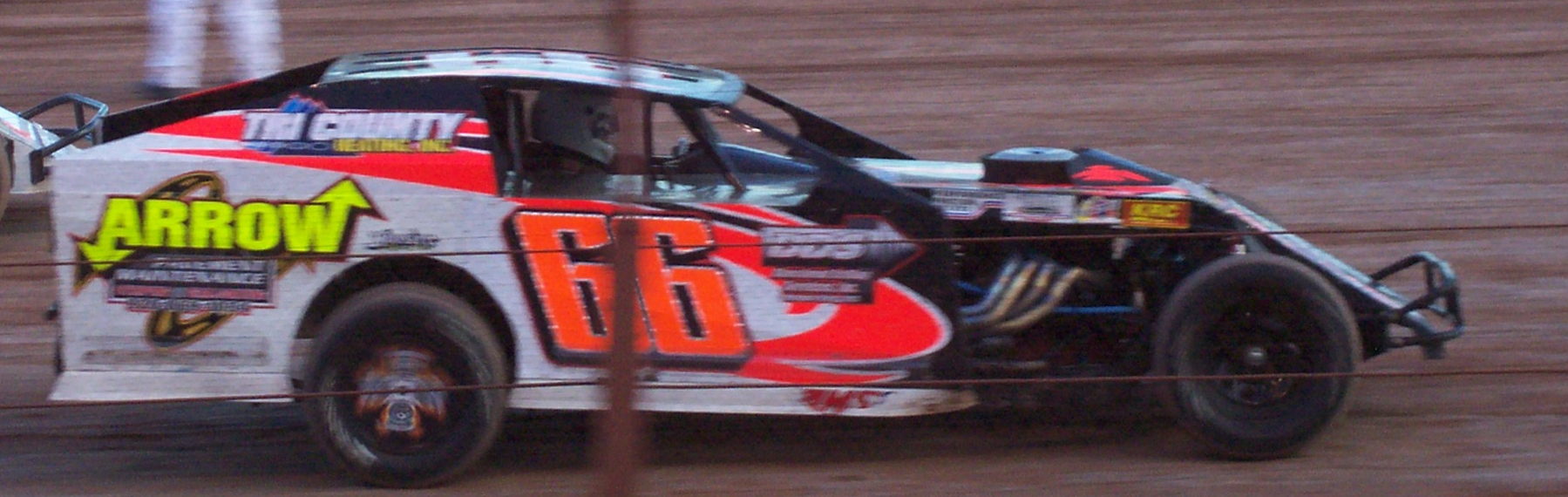
Siefert's 2007 national championship car

- 2025 Jeff Reay
- 2024 Chaz Baca
- 2023 Chaz Baca
- 2022 Jordan Grabouski
- 2021 Jeff Larson
- 2020 Tom Berry Jr.
- 2019 Jordan Grabouski
- 2018 Jordan Grabouski
- 2017 Jason Wolla
- 2016 Jordan Grabouski
- 2015 Chris Abelson
- 2014 Zane DeVilbiss
- 2013 William Gould
- 2012 Keith White
- 2011 Jordan Grabouski
- 2010 Zane Devilbiss
- 2009 Dylan Smith
- 2008 P. J. Egbert
- 2007 Jared Siefert
- 2006 Benji LaCrosse
- 2005 David Murray Jr.
- 2004 David Murray Jr.
- 2003 David Murray Jr.
- 2002 Jon Thompson
- 2001 David Murray Jr.
- 2000 Henry Witt Jr.
- 1999 Johnny Saathoff
- 1998 Johnny Saathoff
- 1997 Johnny Saathoff
- 1996 Johnny Saathoff
- 1995 Rick Stout
- 1994 Scott Pounds
- 1993 Ron Pope
- 1992 Danny Wallace
- 1991 Wayne Larson
- 1990 Bill Davis Sr.
- 1989 Bill Davis Sr.
- 1988 Dave Farren
- 1987 Shane Davis
- 1986 Dave Farren
- 1985 Rick Wages
- 1984 Mike Cothron
- 1983 Mike Schulte
- 1982 Dale Fischlein

== List of IMCA Modified SuperNationals winners ==
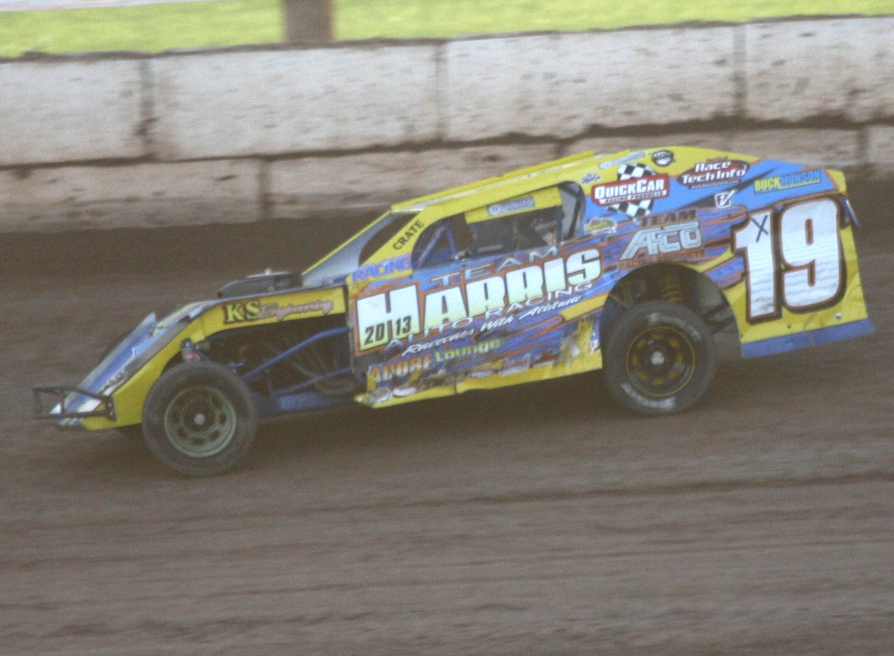
Jimmy Gustin racing (in 2013)

- 2025: Tim Ward
- 2024: Dylan Thornton
- 2023: Tim Ward
- 2022: Tom Berry Jr.
- 2021: Cody Laney
- 2020: Ricky Thornton Jr.
- 2019: Ethan Dotson
- 2018: Jeff Aikey
- 2017: Richie Gustin
- 2016: Ricky Thornton Jr.
- 2015: Kyle Strickler
- 2014: Kyle Strickler
- 2013: Dylan Smith
- 2012: Jeff Taylor
- 2011: Richie Gustin
- 2010: Jimmy Gustin
- 2009: Randy Havlik
- 2008: Kevin Stoa
- 2007: Todd Shute
- 2006: Rich Lewerke
- 2005: Benji LaCrosse
- 2004: David Murray Jr.
- 2003: John Logue
- 2002: Darren Williams
- 2001: John Logue
- 2000: Kevin Stoa
- 1999: John Logue
- 1998: John Logue
- 1997: Mark Noble
- 1996: Kelly Boen
- 1995: John Logue
- 1994: Mark Noble
- 1993: Ron Pope
- 1992: Wayne Graybeal
- 1991: Tom Bartholomew
- 1990: Wayne Larson
- 1989: Kevin Pittman
- 1988: Mark Noble
- 1987: Wayne Larson
- 1986: Mike Frieden
- 1985: Mike Frieden
- 1984: Jack Mitchell
- 1983: Mike Schulte
