= Charity rally =

A charity rally is a charitable event in which participants usually drive, ride or otherwise participate in through the medium of motorised wheeled transportation in an event to raise money for a charitable cause.

== Fundraising Model ==
Fundraising models differ from event to event, however the purpose of a charity rally from the organiser's perspective is to organise an event that will generate funds or direct donations which can then be donated to charitable causes.

A pure charity rally involves participants raising money for charity, which is paid directly to the nominated charitable organisation. Controversy exists over some other forms of charity rallies, whereby organisers fund their costs, and sometimes their lifestyle, from charitable donations, while holding out their organised rally to be a charitable one. Purists consider this to be a form of charity fraud.

== Aid Model ==
In other forms of charity rallies, teams have to compete in a motorsport event and deliver goods, services and other direct aid to the communities they visit during the rally. Rallies such as the Budapest-Bamako and the Mongolia charity rally follow this model. Different schools of thought exist with respect to the type of aid model that a charity rally should support.

== Business Model ==
Ultimately, the choice of aid model follows the organisation's business model. A business model from which the organisers make no profit, either from the entry fee or the funds raised by teams, is the most valuable model for the community. This is a model used by Charity Rallies, a volunteer based rally run by a UK registered charity, with teams paying a £300 entry fee to cover administration costs for the Mongolia charity rally (with the excess being donated to charity), and the teams raising £1,500 for charity, in 2009 and 2010.

Another form of business model involves the events themselves being run by a profit making company, whereby the entry fee supports the organisers who make a profit from organising the event, while teams who take part in the event raise money for charity. The Mongol Rally has a business model like this, with a £650 entry fee being raised for the organisers, and the teams raising an extra £1,000 for nominated charities, in 2009.

== See also ==
=== Pure Charity Rallies ===
- Mongolia charity rally
- Silk Road Race
- Złombol

=== Profit Making Rallies with a charity element ===
- Mongol Rally
- Pothole Rodeo

=== Not Classified ===
- Plymouth-Banjul Challenge
- Budapest-Bamako
- Cape Town Challenge
- Złombol

=== Relevant Sources ===
- Road rally
- Banger rally
