= Mongol Rally =

Intercontinental car rally

Logo of the Mongol Rally

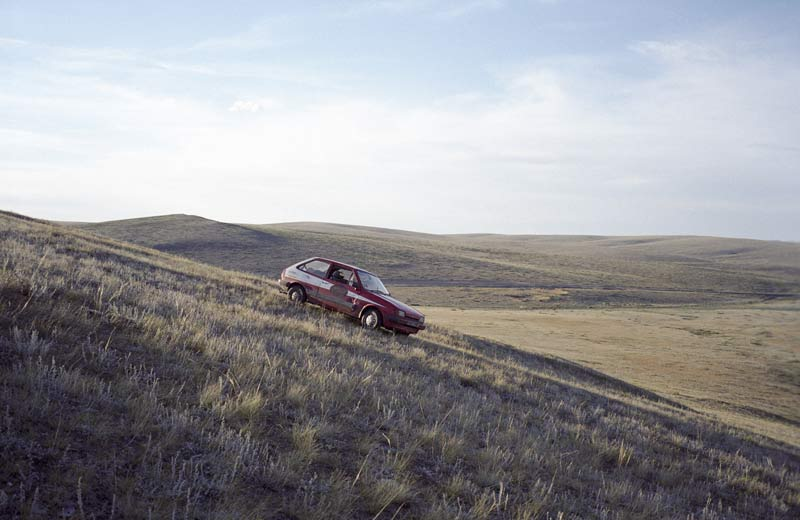
A rally car in Mongolia

The Mongol Rally is an intercontinental car rally that begins in Europe and ends in Oskemen, Kazakhstan. The rally originally ended in Ulaanbaatar, Mongolia. However, regional unrest has caused the current finish line to move to far eastern Kazakhstan. The principal launch is from the Czech Republic, near Prague. There are four fundamental rules to the rally:

- Vehicles have a 1200cc engine limit, but ideally under 1000cc
- Teams are unsupported
- Teams need to raise at least £500 for charity
- Larger engines are allowed if judged to be unsuitable and ridiculous enough; for the 2026 rally, a short school bus was approved for participation

The organizers ("The Adventurists") are careful to point out that racing on highways is illegal. There are other differences from mainstream rallies, particularly the fact that no support team is provided and no other arrangements are made such as for accommodation, maintenance, or fuel.

== History ==
The inaugural rally took place in 2004, in which six teams started and four completed the course. The second rally, in 2005, was entered by 43 teams, and 18 automobiles arrived intact in Ulan Bator. The 2006 rally began on 22 July with 167 cars setting off; 117 made it to Ulan Bator.

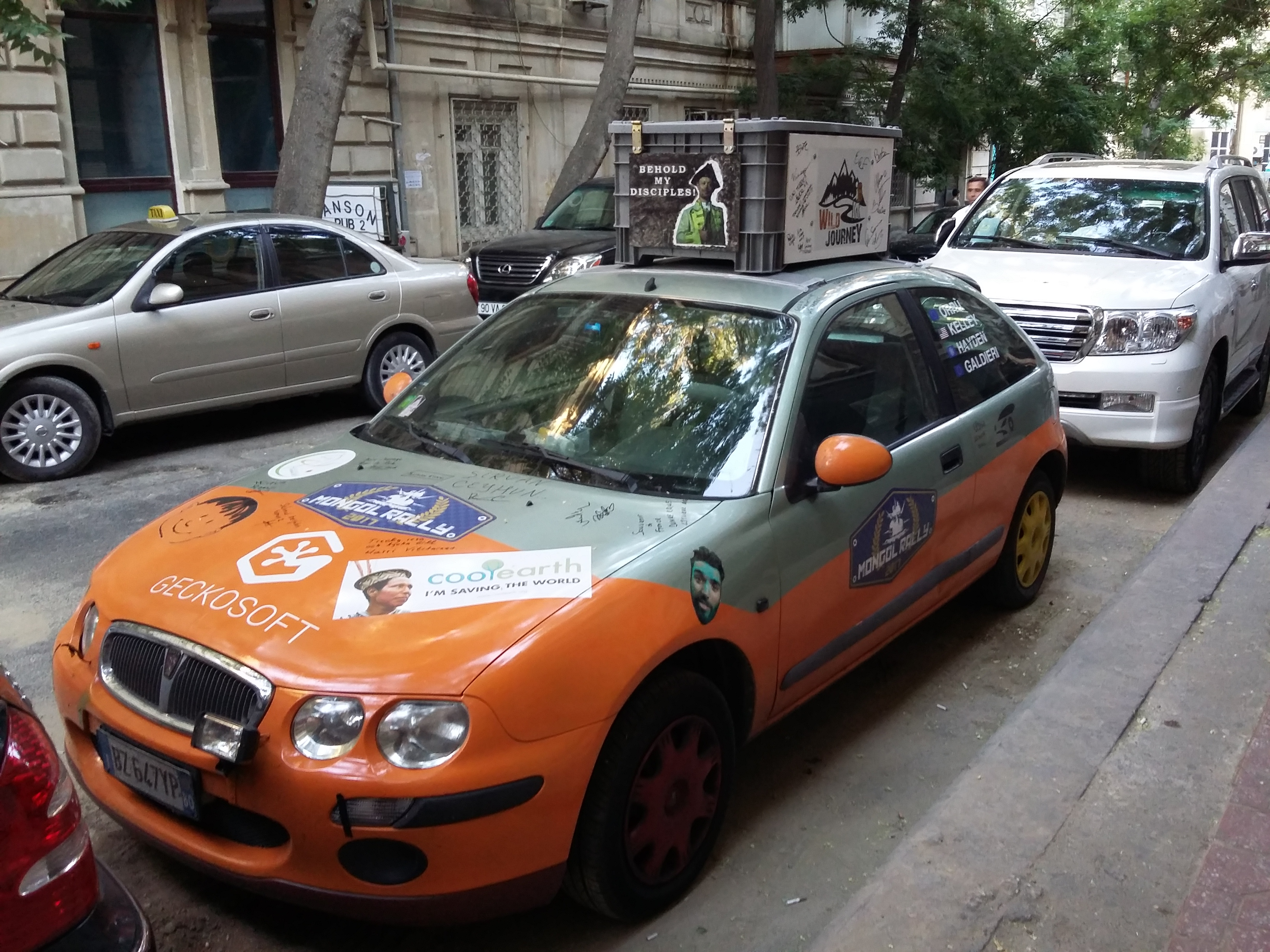
Mongol Rally 2017 car on the street of Baku, Azerbaijan

The Mongol Rally was run as a charity event from 2004 to 2006 with all of the proceeds from the entry fees used to organise the event with the remaining donated to charity. This changed from 2007 as the event is now organised by the League of Adventurists International Ltd, a privately owned profit making UK company. However, the participants continue to raise money for charities through sponsorship.

The 2007 rally left Hyde Park, London, on 21 July and was limited to 200 teams. Registration for 2007 was far more popular than the organisers could have foreseen, with the first 100 places allocated in 22 seconds. Due to this popularity, the final 50 places were awarded on the result of a ballot. In 2007, places were awarded for 2008 in two sign ups with places assigned on 1 November and 7 November. The entry fee was £650 per team. The main British starting point moved from Hyde Park, London, to Goodwood in West Sussex for the 2009 to 2012 events. Cars lapped the circuit in procession before departing. In 2013 the launch was from Bodiam Castle in Sussex and in 2014 it returned to London, launching from Battersea Park.

== Routes ==
Typical Mongolian road

There are an array of suggested routes that teams may take. After setting off from Goodwood or one of the other Western European start points (including France, Italy, and Spain), participants then generally proceed to a launch party in Prague where they converge. Typical routes then head for Moscow, Kyiv or Istanbul, though teams have travelled as far north as the Arctic Circle and as far south as Iran, Turkmenistan and Afghanistan. Teams taking the Ukraine/Russia route or the more southerly Turkey and Iran route often converge at Samarkand, Uzbekistan, before proceeding north-east for Mongolia.

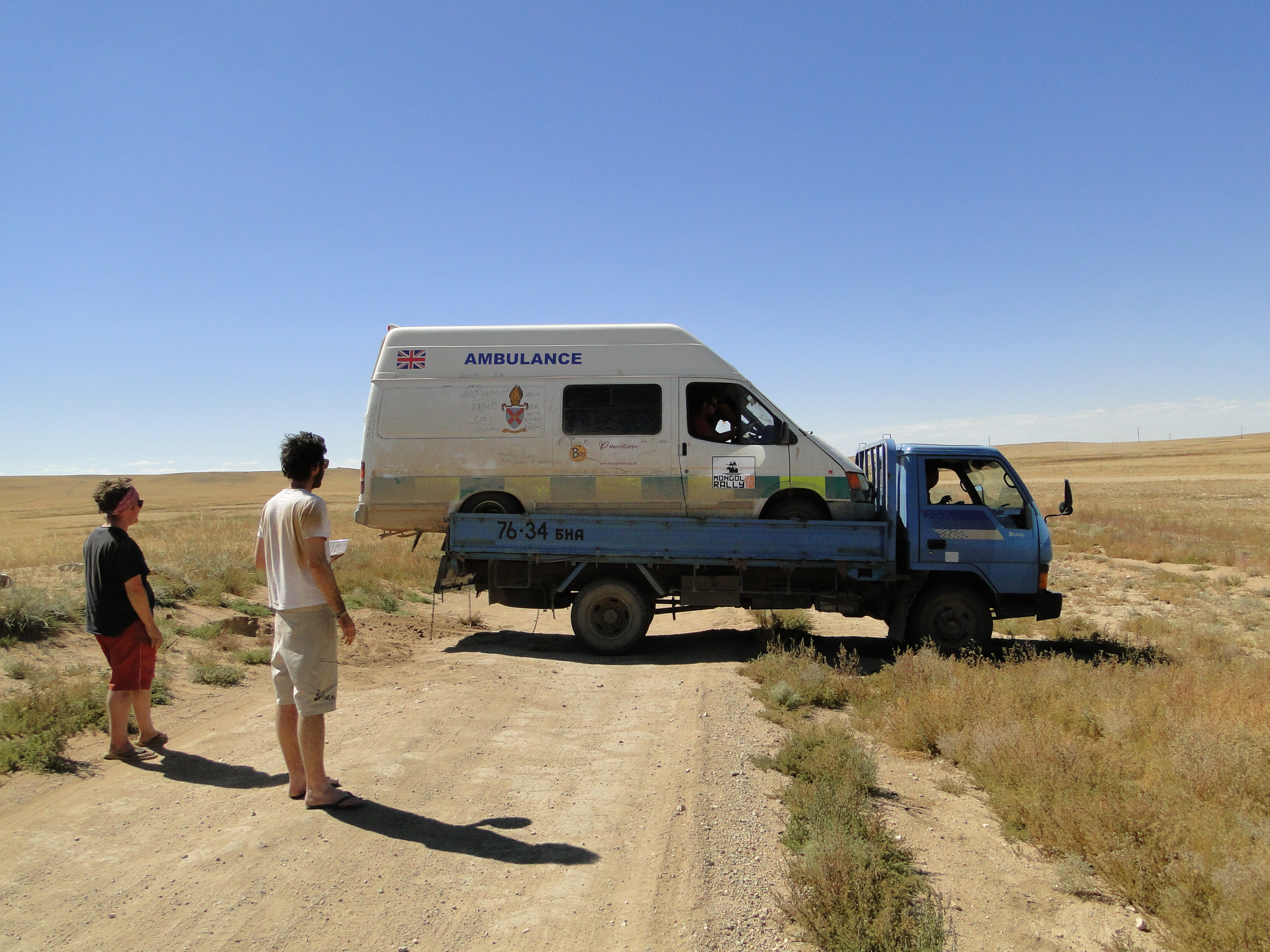
Improvised recovery of an ambulance during the 2010 rally

The final leg of the rally takes surviving vehicles into Mongolia and on to finish back in Russia in Ulan-Ude. None of the available routes is comfortable or safe: damage to cars, robberies and minor injuries are common. Year on year as the rally gains popularity, more and more car accidents occur and many participants require hospital treatment. On 6 August 2010, one British participant died and one other team mate was seriously hurt after a road accident in Iran (near the border between Iran and Turkmenistan).

Depending on the route taken, the total distance driven is around 13,000–16,000 kilometres (8,000–10,000 miles) and most teams complete the rally within three to four weeks.

The most countries ever passed through on the Mongol Rally is currently 41, done in 2018 by an Australian team, Destined to Flail.

== Vehicles ==
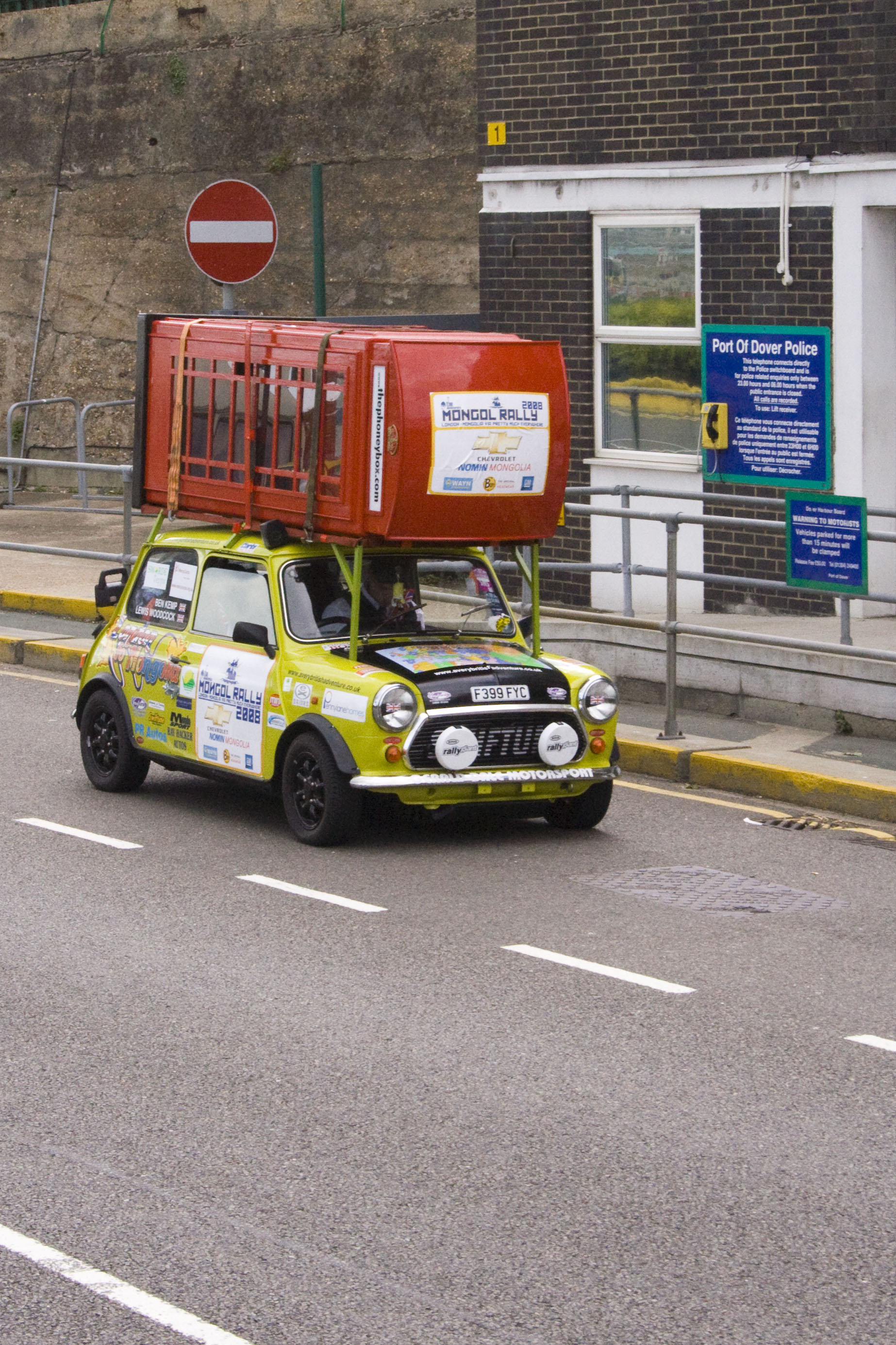
Mini with red telephone box embarking on the 2008 rally

The original rules stated cars should be under 1000cc with no age limit. In 2009 Mongolian import restrictions meant that vehicles must be less than 10 years old and the engine limit was raised to 1200cc to account for the difficulty in finding modern cars under 1000cc. In 2013 Mongolian import restrictions meant that vehicles had to be less than 5 years old.

Because vehicles less than 5 years old are outside the budget of many people in 2014 the rules were 'devolved' it was decided that cars of any age would be allowed on the Rally but they must be removed from Mongolia after the event. Without the import restrictions the engine size limit has reverted to 1000cc.

=== Motorcycles ===
Motorcycles and scooters of up to 125cc are permitted on the Rally.

=== Other vehicles ===
Comedy vehicles have always been welcome on the rally, but from 2010 to 2013 if they were over 1200cc or over 9 years old they needed to be removed after the Rally. From 2006 to 2012 emergency service vehicles were accepted for donation in Mongolia if they were in good condition, but in 2013 it was decided that Mongolia had no longer any practical need for these vehicles as it had begun to get new emergency vehicles from Japan and Korea.

=== After the rally ===
Some of the cars do not make it to Mongolia; they are sold when they break down, or are left behind due to time pressure. They may not be simply abandoned without the participants responsible losing a deposit lodged with the organisers. Previous rally vehicles can now be found operating throughout Central Asia thanks to enterprising local mechanics who have repaired abandoned vehicles.

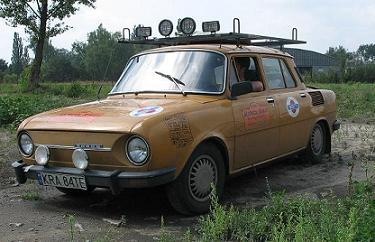
A Škoda S110 used by Škoda Power Turbo Racing Team in the 2006 rally. A typical entrant prior to the 2009 rule change regarding age

While the cars were imported to Mongolia and donated or sold for charity until 2013, in 2014 all Mongol Rally cars were shipped or driven back to Europe. The shipped cars were either collected by their owners or scrapped.

Prior to 2014 the organisers made arrangements for the cars to be imported into Mongolia without import duties. From 2004-06 they made use of a standard procedure used by non-profit making organisations, charities, and non-governmental organisations in Mongolia that provides exemption from the most significant taxes levied on older vehicles. Under Mongolian law the importing organization in Mongolia was then prevented from selling the vehicle for 3 years. Since 2007 the organizers had a special agreement with the Mongolian government. The cars will be auctioned and the money raised donated to a project as chosen by the drivers of each car.

There were many organizations in Mongolia who were grateful for the vehicles; furthermore, the low cost of labour in Mongolia made it economical to repair and run old cars that would be scrapped in Europe. Nevertheless, due to the concerns, the organizers of the Rally stipulated in the contract with teams in 2006 that they should not remove components from the car, such as the rear seats, to ensure that the vehicles remained useful and achieved a reasonable return at auction.

== Teams ==
On average, between 250 and 300 teams enter the rally annually. Most teams have 2-4 people.

== Entry fee ==
In 2004 there was no entry fee, although the 6 teams had to raise a minimum of £500 each, to be paid directly to that year's rally charity Send a Cow. In 2005, an entry fee of £50 per person was paid to the organisers to cover the expenses of the rally. Teams were also required to raise a minimum charity donation of £1000 per team split equally and paid directly to the chosen Charities Send a Cow and Save the Children. In 2006, the entry fee payable to the organisers was increased to £227. Teams were required to raise a minimum of £1000 per team: £250 payable to Send a Cow with the remaining £750 payable to either Mercy Corps, CAMDA, Wild Cru or the Christina Noble Children's Foundation. In 2006, the teams taking part in the Rally together raised in excess of £200,000 for the Rally charities.

Since 2009 the entry fee has been set at £650, with an additional minimum charity donation set at £1000 per vehicle and a vehicle deposit of £500–repayable providing the vehicle is not dumped anywhere en route.

== Organizers ==
The Mongol Rally is now organized by the company set up by the founder, Tom Morgan, called The League of Adventurists International Limited (number 05995303) incorporated on 10 November 2006.

== Sponsorship and TV coverage ==
On the 2006 rally a number of TV crews accompanied teams along the route. The 2006 event was also sponsored by .travel with the sponsorship money going towards the cost of organising the event. The Expedia Let Yourself Go Team were also featured on the Expedia website. The Mongolian Taxi Service team appeared on the Fifth Gear motoring program as part of a feature on the toughness of the Daihatsu Charade, inspired by their own Charade completing the rally entirely unscathed.

Jack Osbourne, son of Ozzy and Sharon Osbourne, took part in the 2007 rally with Amaryllis Knight, the daughter of the former editor of The Economist and News Corporation director Andrew Knight, in a 1991 750cc Fiat Panda; their journey was aired on a television show named "Jack Osbourne, Mongol Rally".

In 2009, rallier Joe Sabia created Tupac in Kazakhstan, which pieced together dozens of Kazakhs to sing Changes by Tupac Shakur. The video is the most widely watched Mongol Rally video with over a million views (June 2013).

== Background ==
In 2001 Mr Tom and Mr Joolz found themselves staring in awe at their slightly dishevelled Fiat 126 wondering what to do with it. After not very long they came up with the only sensible plan - to drive to the most ridiculous place they could think of. Mongolia was chosen, being 10,000 miles [16,000 km] away as the drunk crow flies and sporting a fine selection of the world's worst roads it seemed perfect. So with no changes of clothes, a packet of cheap cigars and a hunting knife, they set forth. Although they didn't quite reach Mongolia because of visa and border trouble they enjoyed themselves so much that they swore to return and try again. From this premise the great Mongol Rally was born.

The idea later formed part of Tom Morgan's BA degree in Sculpture and was displayed at the Winchester School of Art BA Degree Show in 2003.

== Casualties ==
The rally website warns of the risks of this kind of adventure. An undisclosed number of racers have been injured since 2004. In 2010 an adventurer was killed and one injured in an accident while crossing Iran.

== See also ==
- Mongolia charity rally
- Plymouth-Banjul Challenge
- Budapest-Bamako
- Charity rally
- Silk Road Race
