= Banger rally =

A banger rally is a rally in a scrap or low value car on public roads. The event is a non-racing variant of banger racing. A banger rally may also be a charity rally where the teams taking part in the event also raise money for charity. Banger rallies chiefly appear to be a United Kingdom-based phenomenon and most involve driving through Europe to various destinations where the cars are environmentally scrapped, sold or auctioned for charity. Some events have a limit on how much a participant can spend on buying a car or the size of the engine. Participants in the events often decorate their vehicles with the stickers of sponsors or customising to a theme from popular culture.

== Events ==
=== Plymouth Dakar ===
The banger rally first appeared when Julian Nowill took a group of sub £100 vehicles to Dakar over the Christmas and New Year of 2002/2003. The event was called the 'Plymouth Dakar' as a play on the name of the famous Paris Dakar rally. The event is now known as the Plymouth-Banjul Challenge.

=== Staples2Naples ===
A variation of the Dakar appeared in 2003 in the form of Staples2Naples, Banger Rally for Wage Slaves. This event developed into the much copied European Banger Rally style which continues to this day.

Rusty Rex Rallies Rex to Nice.

Rusty rex rallies have a modern take on a banger rally. They vary to traditional rallies with a sightseeing treasure hunt. The route is designed around interesting and famous landmarks rather than a point to point end destination.

=== Pothole Rodeo ===
The Pothole Rodeo by BackRoadClub is a rally with a variety of routes around Europe. While the original route explores the Balkan Peninsula, the more recent rallies have also travelled through the UK, the Baltic States, Austria and Germany. The emphasis of the event is on the community rather than the speed, whoever gets the most points in bizarre challenges wins and gets to take home a price.

== See also ==
- Gambler 500 — The Gambler 500 is a low-value off-road oriented rally-style event in the United States.
