= Staples2Naples =

European banger car rally

Staples2Naples is a European Banger rally organised by StreetSafari.

== History ==
The first Staples2Naples rally took place in 2003. The initial rally took place over 4 days and involves participants driving 1,500 miles to Naples in cars bought for less than £100. "Staples" from the name refers to Staples Corner, a junction in the M1 motorway. It was won by Team Frontbum consisting of Stumpy, Wolfie and Undies.
