= Baja 4000 =

- Category: Rally raid
- Region: United States (United States); Mexico
- Inaugural season: 2017
- Teams: 50
- Official website: www.Baja4000.org

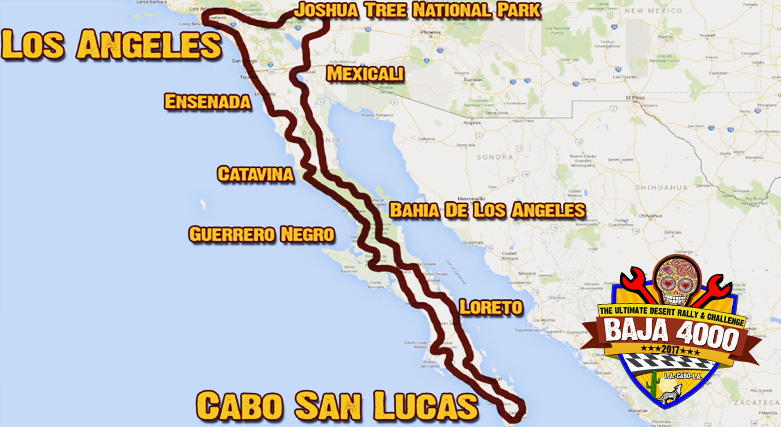
Preliminary Map Of The Baja 4000

The Baja 4000 is a biennial off-road charity rally and road trip organized by the creators of the largest amateur rally in the world, the Budapest-Bamako. It's a low budget, amateur version of the famous Baja 1000 and Dakar Rally. The first edition was held in January 2017. The rally started in Los Angeles and traveled 4000 kilometers on the Baja California peninsula in Mexico. In 2018 before the second edition of the event organizers changed the event's name to Baja XL.

== Philosophy and rules ==
The guiding principle of the Baja 4000 is the same as the Budapest-Bamako's, Anyone, By Anything, In Any Way. There are no restrictions on the vehicles or individuals that can enter and no set routes. Participants have to complete daily stages between Los Angeles and Cabo San Lucas and back. It is not a timed event. Points are awarded for completing daily stages in certain time periods. In addition, there are geocaching challenges along the way for additional points. If a team does not complete a stage, they are still in the race. Cars do not have to arrive at the finish line, only participants. Teams can participate in racing or touring categories.

== Route ==
The rally will spend a long day in California before entering Mexico at Mexicali. Teams drove south on the Gulf of California side of the peninsula and north on the Pacific Ocean side.

- United States
- Mexico

More than 4,000 kilometers were covered within 10 days.

=== Categories ===
Teams can enter in the competitive category where navigational points need to be reached and daily stages completed. It is a point race and not a timed event. In touring, category teams travel at their own pace and there is no competition.

== Charity ==
The Baja 4000 is primarily a charity event, that raises donations for abandoned children and orphans in Mexico through Corazon de Vida.

== Name Change ==
In the summer of 2018 the Baja 4000 changed its name to Baja XL to further differentiate itself from other rallies following the Baja + number format.
