= Gambler 500 =

Mostly off-road rally-style navigational adventure

The Gambler 500 Rally is a mostly off-road rally-style navigational adventure using cheap, impractical or fun vehicles to run through the country picking up trash and removing abandoned vehicles and boats. Participants are encouraged to spend no more than US$500 on their vehicle; however, this limit is not enforced. Vehicles can be modified with no cap. The Gambler 500 began in Oregon, where it is now known as "OG500", and has since spread across the United States, Canada (Gambler 500BC) and Iceland (G500ÍS). The motto is "Always Be Gambling,″ abbreviated as "ABG".

== Event overview ==
Teams typically consist of a cheap car, a driver, and a navigator, with the objective to hit daily GPS navigational waypoints. It is a two-day event, with a party at the midpoint and another at the end of day two.

=== History ===
The Gambler 500, founded by Tate Morgan and the Oregon group began in 2014 as a challenge to see how far $500 cars could go. The first year had 14 cars, and in 2015 the number of participants increased to 28, then 31 in 2016. The Gambler 500 gained rapid popularity growth in 2017, with over 800 vehicles participating in Oregon. In 2017, independent Gambler 500 regional events occurred in many areas. In 2018 there were roughly 4,000 attendees and 1,600+ vehicles at the base camp in Chemult, OR, which saw people from all across the U.S. and parts of Canada taking part in the fun and helping clean up the highways and byways of Oregon. There was enough "trail trash" collected to fill three 40ft containers. One local law enforcement officer said that he had nothing but good things to say for the event and participants, also stating that he only had 2 incidents where "gamblers" were involved - only one resulting in a citation over the course of 3 days. The 2017 event in Winthrop, WA, was the second largest that year, with 125 vehicles attending. On May 22, 2023, it partnered with BeamNG, developers of the video game BeamNG.drive and held a modding contest, ending on June 30, 2023.

== See also ==
- Banger rally — a chiefly British event focusing on road rallying with inexpensive automobiles
