= Mongolia charity rally =

UK charity event

Mitsubishi Pajero in Mongolia

The Mongolia Charity Rally is the charity rally from London to the capital of Mongolia, Ulaanbaatar. The Mongolia Charity Rally is organised by Charity Rallies, part of Go Help, a UK-based charity.

== Adventure ==
Participants start the 10,000-mile (16,000 km) trip from a Mongolian Naadam festival in London, England. The vehicles are then driven to Ulaanbaatar, Mongolia, where they are donated to a partner charity of Go Help for auction. Charity Ralliers must raise a minimum of £1,500 for UK charity Go Help, that runs Charity Rallies, through Go Help's JustGiving page, before departing. The main beneficiary of the 2008 and 2009 Mongolia Charity Rally was Save the Children.

The Mongolia Charity Rally launches from Highbury Fields in Islington, London. Go Help and the Mongolian Association organise a Mongolian Naadam to see Charity Ralliers off on their adventure, an event that is heavily attended by the Mongolian community in London, and was featured on ITV Local, a UK television network.

== Routes ==
The main routes to Mongolia are either the Northern Route, from London to Mongolia via Moscow, or the Southern Route, via Turkmenistan, Uzbekistan, Kazakhstan and Russia.

== Entry fees ==
The Mongolia Charity Rally charges an entry fee that is aimed at covering the costs of running the event. All excess funds that are generated from entry fees are donated to a project started by Go Help that provides riding helmets to child jockeys taking part in Mongolian Naadam festivals, a project that was covered by Mongolian television in 2008. The entry fee for the Mongolia Charity Rally 2010 is £300 for teams signing up before October 1, after which the invitation is by invitation only. The entry fee for 2009 was also £300, which is less than half the entry fee of £650 charged in 2009 by a competing rally run by a profit making company. The 2008 entry fee was £150. The increase reflected two major additions to Go Help's budget: the hiring of an employee in Mongolia to oversee vehicle sales and to monitor the application of funds raised by Charity Ralliers, and the costs of full-time development of the Charity Rallies website.

== See also ==
- Charity rally
- Mongol Rally
