= Plymouth-Banjul Challenge =

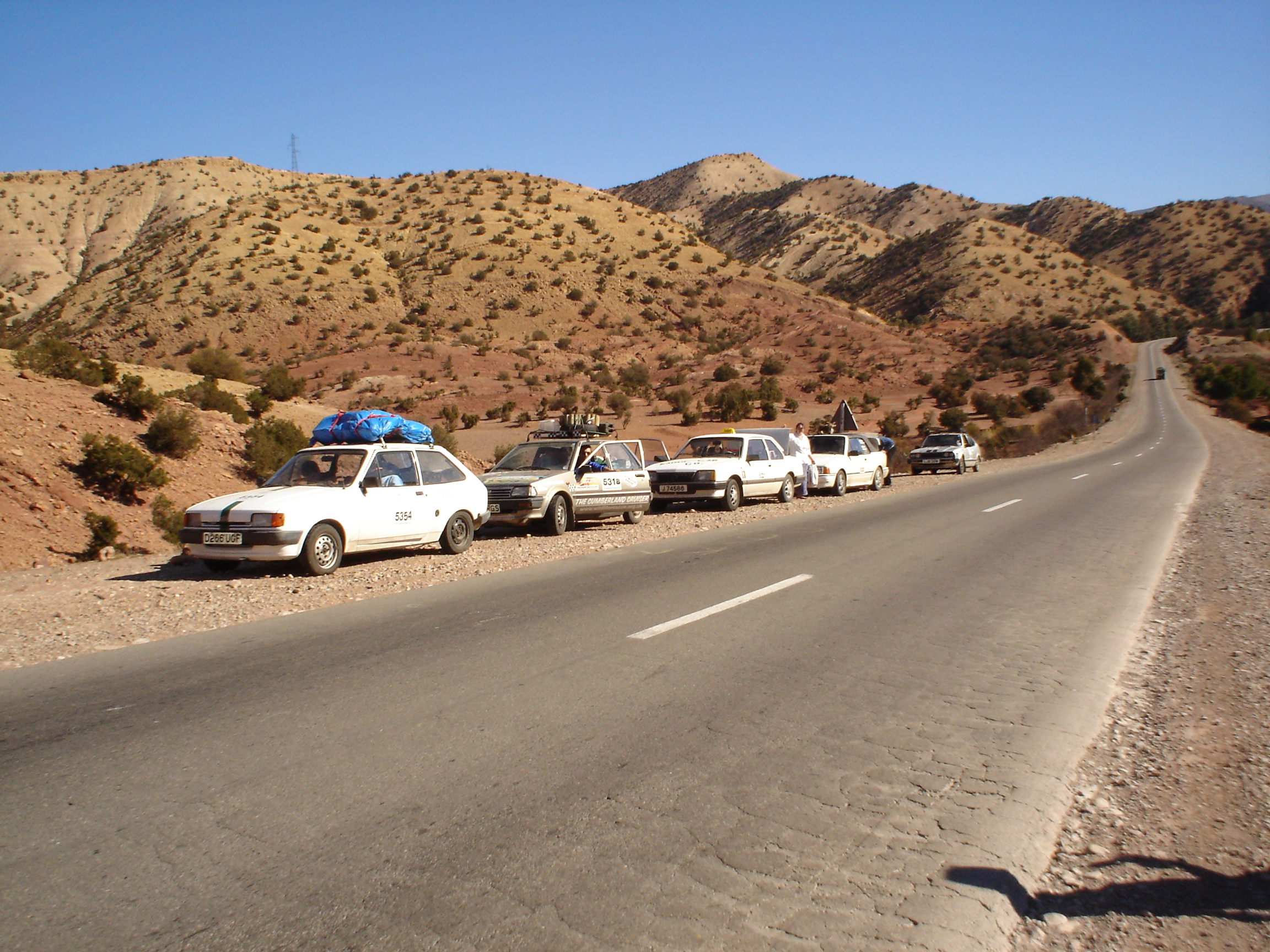
Rally 2004/2005

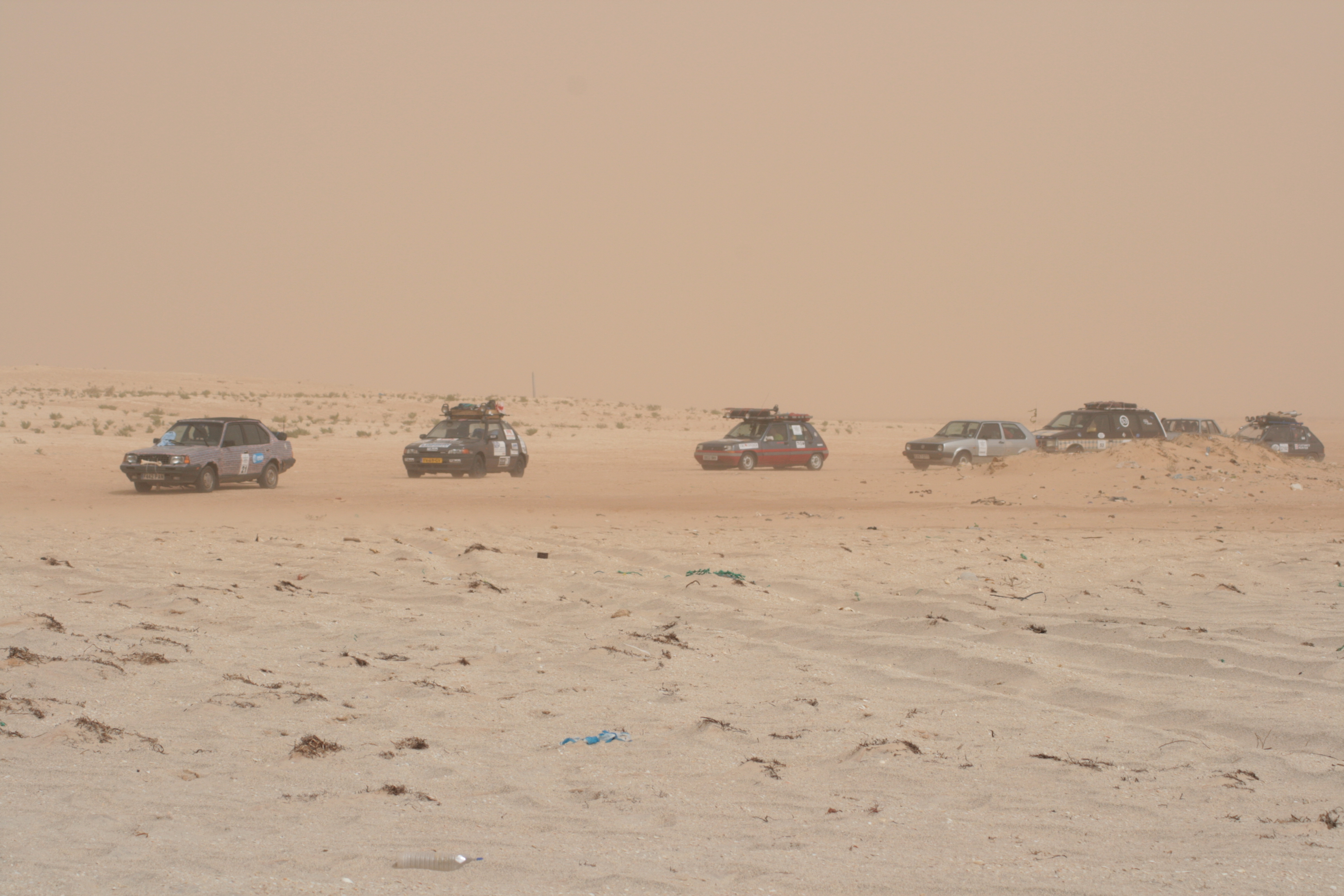
Convoy

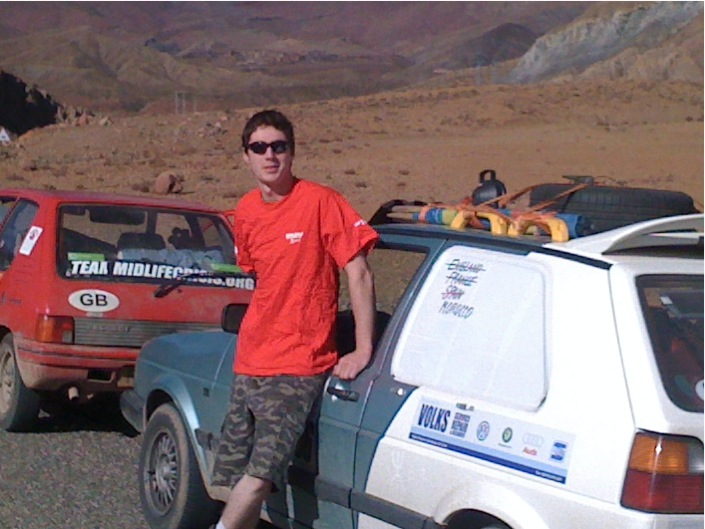

The Plymouth-Banjul Challenge is run by 'Dakar Challenge' and self described as 'The original Banger Challenge’ and previously known as the Plymouth-Dakar Challenge, is an annual car event for charity. Established in 2002, the first rally went to Dakar in 2003, and then on to Banjul from 2005. It very roughly follows the route of the more famous Dakar Rally, visiting many of the same countries.

Starting in Plymouth (Devon), participants travel through France and onto Tarifa in Southern Spain. Then the course runs through Morocco, Western Sahara, Mauritania, Senegal and finally into the Gambia - a distance of approximately 4,400 Miles. Participants were previously told to be driving a left hand drive cars worth approximately £100, although there are now no formal rules on value and right hand drive cars of any value can be used, on the basis they are donated to the Rotary Club of The Gambia on arrival.

Participants in the challenge are on their own, meaning that no assistance is rendered to motorists in case of a car breakdown or even if they become stranded.

Mechanical reliability is the main obstacle to completing the course given that such vehicles are ordinary road cars and are mostly at the end of their useful lifetimes. Many cars cope very well until they have to go through the desert and then almost all suffer a great deal due to high temperatures and dust. Once the cars make it to Banjul in Gambia they are auctioned for, or donated to, charity.

== History and notable entrants ==
Amongst the many cars that have taken part in the challenge was the fine Peugeot 505 family estate that went on to be auctioned at the end of the rally for several times the amount of money it would have commanded back in the UK. The 2006 rally included a 1983 BMW 732i which appeared to be incapable of making it out of England but in fact did complete the course; a Fiat Uno which performed fantastically and even pushed the previously mentioned BMW up a mountain; some Renault 19s and a VW Beetle. In addition a number of 4x4 vehicles regularly enter ranging from quite reasonable vehicles that 'bend' the entry rules to vehicles over 40 years old rebuilt from wrecks just for the challenge.

The 2004 event had one team, The Idiots Abroad, tow a trailer with two motorbikes on it through the desert - the challenge has now been laid down for another team to get a trailer through the desert and in 2006 two ambulances made it across.

In the 2004/2005 event, a Swiss Team (Team Pintpullers) drove a Mercedes Van and a 125cc motorbike from Switzerland to Banjul. The Bike was ridden the entire time and reached Banjul where it was donated to the local police.

There are even people who cannot drive taking part with one half of a Fiat Uno team learning to drive in the desert where he managed to crash it into a Welsh Ambulance and two Canadians who bought a manual car in France and spent the next few weeks learning to drive it.

Since 2007, the rally also has a group of cars continuing on to Bamako, Mali. The 2009/2010 Banjul Challenge was called off by its organiser Julian Nowill due to Mauritanian security concerns (French tourist murders and Spanish aid workers kidnappings), but two teams from group 1 (Team Midlife Crises and team Homesick) and made it all the way to Banjul in the Gambia. Only 5 teams from three groups (39 teams) made it to the finish line.

== See also ==
- Charity rally
- Banger rally
- Budapest-Bamako
- Mongol Rally
