= Silk Road Race =

The Silk Road Race is a charity rally from Milan to the capital of Tajikistan, Dushanbe. The Silk Road Race is organised by Partenza Intelligente, a non-profit cultural association based in Lainate (Milan), Italy. The first edition of the rally was launched on 31 July 2010.

== Adventure ==
The Silk Road Race typically launches from Villa Litta Visconti Borromeo, a historic palace of the 16th century in Lainate near Milan, Italy, in the last week of July. The teams participate in the Start Night launch event with many people and a rock concert during the launching procedure. The teams can participate in the rally with any motor-based vehicle, there is no limit based on engine displacement or vehicle type.

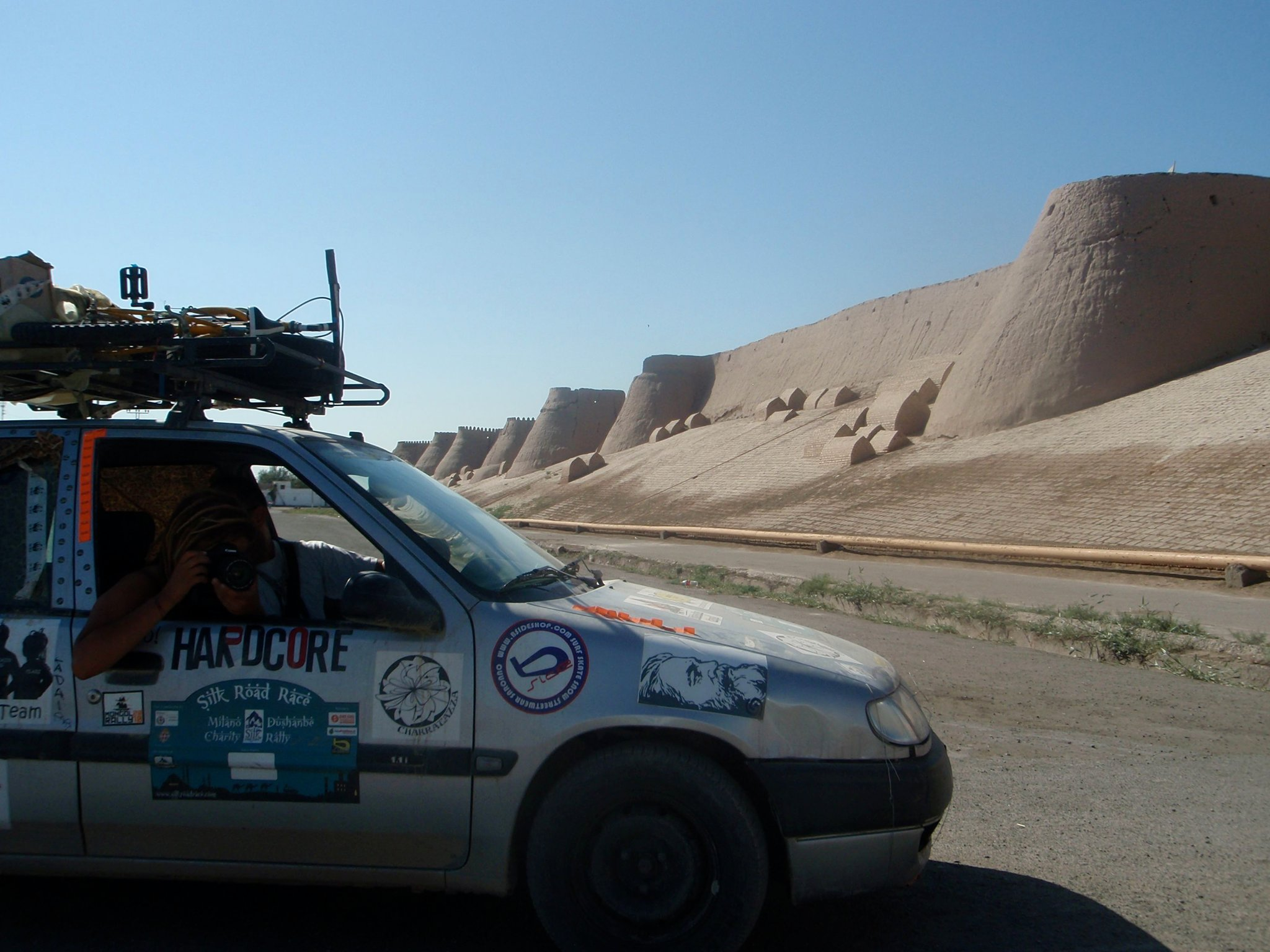
A Silk Road Race team

== Routes ==
There are typically three main routes to Tajikistan. The northern route, from Milan to Tajikistan via east Europe: Ukraine, Russia, Kazakhstan, and Uzbekistan; the middle route: Turkey, Georgia, Azerbaijan and then crossing the Caspian Sea to Turkmenistan; or the south route: Turkey, Iran, Turkmenistan, Uzbekistan, and then Tajikistan. However, the route is free; teams can choose their route to Tajikistan, but they must arrive at Dushanbe in 3 weeks to join the finish party. The Silk Road Race is approximately 8.000 km long.

== Entry fees ==
The Silk Road Race charges an entry fee to cover the costs of running the event. All funds generated from charity fees are donated to a project started by Cesvi that provides water and sanitation in the south region of Tajikistan. The Silk Road Race 2012 entry fee for a car or a truck team was €499 and €250 for a motorcycle. A team comprises a single vehicle: a car/truck or a motorcycle. The Silk Road Race 2012 minimum charity fee for cars/trucks teams was €950 and €300 for a motorcycle team.

== See also ==
- Mongol Rally

== Press coverage of the Silk Road Race Milano-Dushanbe charity rally ==
- Silk Road Race 2011 edition - Gazzetta dello Sport
- Silk Road Race 2010 edition - Corriere della Sera Viaggi
- Silk Road Race 2010 edition - Repubblica Viaggi
- Silk Road Race 2012 edition - Turisti per Caso
