= Budapest-Bamako =

Charity rally raid event

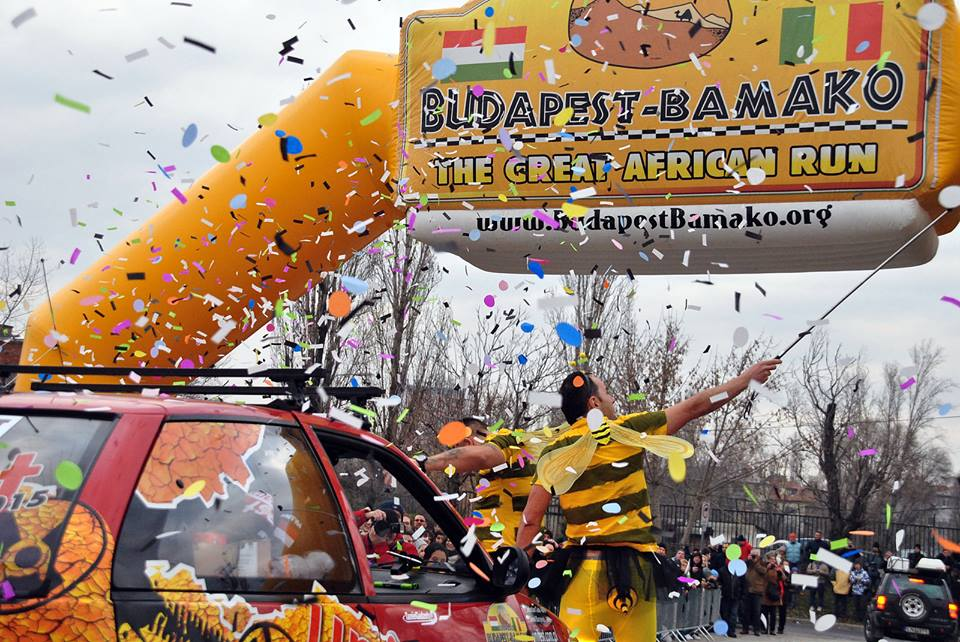
Budapest-Bamako Start 2015

The Budapest-Bamako or Great African Run is a charity car race in Europe and Africa, and the largest amateur rally in the world. It is a low-budget version of the Dakar Rally, and goes from Budapest, Hungary to Bamako, Mali through the Sahara. It passes through Hungary, Austria or Slovenia, Italy, France, Spain, Morocco, Mauritania and Mali. The Budapest-Bamako was inspired by the Paris-Dakar Rally. There are few entry restrictions: as long as a vehicle is street legal, it can join the event.

== History ==
The event was the brainchild of Hungarian internet entrepreneur and former radio shock jock Andrew G. Szabo, who wanted to give rally fans an option to the more expensive and stricter Dakar rally. After first envisioning a direct drive through the Sahara in Tunisia, Libya, Niger, Burkina Faso, and Mali he opted for a safer and more scenic route around the Western rim of Africa.

=== 2005 ===
On 26 December 2005, forty-two teams lined up in Budapest's Hősök tere for the inaugural run of the Budapest-Bamako. Two weeks later all but two teams arrived in Bamako's Place des Heroes (both meaning Heroes' Square in English). In 2007, over a hundred teams entered the race. Only ten of them did not cross the finish line.

=== 2008 ===
In 2008, over 400 people in 160 vehicles entered the Great African Run. Among the more unusual vehicles were a 1961 Velorex, an Ikarus 435 articulated bus, an ice cream truck, a Dacia, a Wartburg and a Polish Fiat 126. The 2008 run started amid security fears a week after the cancellation of the Dakar Rally. Several French and Spanish teams dropped out of the Bamako citing fears of terror in Mauritania. The run was completed with few problems. The Mauritanian government assigned thousands of military and police officers to guard the event.

The touring category was lighter and simpler than in previous years. Teams in the touring category enjoyed events like the Annual Star Wars Theme Party on Planet Tatooine in Morocco, the Tropic of Cancer Party or the B2 Big Beach Party in Mauritania on a virgin beach, that has been named B2 Beach.

=== 2009 ===
In 2009, the racing and the touring categories were completely separated. The race featured a more demanding course. There were stricter time controls and more sophisticated geo-challenges.

=== 2010 ===
In 2010 edition of the rally was directed by four time Budapest-Bamako veterans, Andras Polgar and his brother Tamas. Less than 36 hours before the start, the Mauritanian and Mali stages were cancelled after the Hungarian Foreign Ministry warned the Polgars of potential terror threats in Mauritania. That year, the rally ended in Agadir. Despite the changes in the official finish line 41 teams and over 25 tons of aid arrived in Bamako without incident after on February 1, 2010.

After the 2010 run, the organization of the Budapest-Bamako reverted to the founder of the event with the promise of returning to Mali in 2011.

=== 2011 ===
The 2011 rally ended successfully after teams completed one of the hardest editions of the rally. For the first time in its history the rally travelled through Senegal. Only 125 of the 160 teams finished and only 18 of the 40 race category teams crossed the finish line.

=== 2012 ===
In 2012, the finish line was the capital Guinea-Bissau. For the first time in the history of the rally Bamako was not the end stage. Drivers had to travel through Senegal once again.

=== 2013 ===
Organizers moved the finish line to Guinea-Bissau after a politically uncertain year in Mali. Hungary's anti-terror agency urged organizers to cancel because of the threat of kidnappings. The 2013 rally ended without incident. Out of the 142 teams only 89 crossed the finish line.

=== 2014 ===
Days before the start of the 2014 edition, organizer Andrew G. Szabo announced that the 2015 run would be the last Budapest-Bamako. Amid the continuing political instability in Mali and Guinea-Bissau, the rally ended in The Gambia. The capital, Banjul hosted the finish line ceremonies. The 2014 rally ended without incident. Out of the 145 teams, 105 finished the race on time.

=== 2015 ===
Three months before the start of the 2015 edition the Ministry of Tourism in Mali ensured the Budapest-Bamako its continued supported in exchange for two more runs to Mali. Organizers announced that the rally will return to Bamako in 2016 and 2017 if the security climate permits. The 2015 rally started amid the West Africa Ebola crises of 2014/15. Even though Mali become Ebola free just days before the rally started, the 2015 edition saw a record number of cancellations. Several members of the Mali Government welcomed the rally on February 1, 2015 in Bamako. Out of the 124 departing teams 102 arrived in Mali. The event was held without incident. The competition was won by the Hungarian, Gumis Ember Team.

=== 2016 ===
Two months prior to the start, on Nov 20, 2015 Islamist militants took 170 people hostage in a hotel in Mali. This was a strong deterrent once again for participants to cancel their participation in the 2016 run. Organizers and the Malian government reinforced security. Because of the large number of cancellations, breakdowns and continued fears only 68 teams finished out of the 120 who entered the rally. The competition was won by the Hungarian, Gumis Ember team again. Amid the security concerns, the organizer of the rally announced the Budapest-Bamako will become a bi-annual event. During the intermediate years the team will produce a series of road rallies and adventure trips on the Bamako-Adventures umbrella. The first such rally, the Baja 4000 was announced prior to the start of the 2016 Budapest-Bamako.

Some teams continue traveling independently after reaching Bamako, either driving back to Europe, or to other places in Africa.

Citing organizational complexities and difficulties with making arrangements in Africa, the organizers announced in January 2016 that the rally would henceforth be held every other year. During the intermediate years they would organize a similar charity rally, road trip or community adventure to another part of the world. The first such event was planned for January 2017 to the Baja peninsula of Mexico.

=== 2018 ===
The twelfth edition of the Budapest-Bamako started on January 12, 2018. Due to security concerns, the destination this year was Banjul in The Gambia rather than Bamako in Mali. Teams lined up for the start ceremony in Budapest before a four-day super marathon stage, west across Europe and then on to Midelt in Morocco. Over the next 12 days, teams would deal with snow-covered roads in the Atlas mountains, rocky trails through Morocco, driving winds and desert sands in Mauritania, winding dusty tracks in Senegal, before reaching the finish line in Banjul on January 28.

The competition was won by the Jatekshop.hu Team of Hamza Péter, Felméri László, Nagy Zoltán, and Heksh Kálmán in a Nissan Patrol. Motorcycles category was won by Hungarian Viktor Somogyi of Netwerk Rally Team on a KTM 640 Rally. This run hosted the first Tesla to cross the Sahara and continued the charity mission, delivering a school bus, aid, multiple vehicle donations and digging a well in a village outside JanJanBureh, The Gambia. This year also saw a serious road crash with a team forced off the road by a truck swerving onto their side. The driver suffered life-threatening injuries and was evacuated to Europe, later dying.

=== 2020 ===
Participant count for the 2020 broke all previous records. Seven hundred and thirty participants from 80 different countries entered the longest and most ambitious edition of the rally. The 2020 line-up included a Hungarian priest and 68-year-old Hungarian operetta diva Oszvald Marika. Inspired by a 1984 Dakar route, the rally's founder Andrew G. Szabo decided to take the rally to another West African destination, Sierra Leone. The deteriorating political and security situation in Bamako still did not permit a return to the Malian capital. For the first time in the rally's history, teams had to drive across Guinea as well. The Guinean authorities welcomed the rally with open arms, but amid political chaos and anti government protests in Labé they made organizers change the route of the rally. The rally had to pass through the town of Gaoual. The Gaoual-Kindia stage became so demanding that only 20% of the teams could complete this section. On February 16, 2020 the rally came to a roaring finish in Freetown's national stadium. Sierra Leone's president Julius Maada Bio welcomed teams. Thirty-one teams did not make it to the finish line.

The race was won by the Hungarian Körös Autó team. Two Estonian teams came in second and third.

=== 2022 ===
The 2022 rally was the longest, hottest and wettest rally in the history of the event. The start had to be postponed twice because of COVID-19 pandemic shutdowns in Morocco. The rally started on October 21 at Budaörs Airport in Budapest, Hungary. Despite the record number of entries, 547 people and 247 teams from 75 countries joined the rally. Unlike any other previous Budapest-Bamako the rally was 19 days long and 9,432 kilometers long. Unlike in previous years the drivers had to cross the Sahara in October where daytime temperatures sometimes reached 50 degrees Celsius. The oldest participant was 70-year-old Polish driver Julian Obricki, who returned to Africa for the first time since the 1988 Dakar Rally. The rally travelled through Guinea for the second time and finished in Sierra Leone. Julius Maada Bio and members of the Sierra Leone government welcomed the finishers in Freetown on November 8. During the finish line ceremony, organizing team member Szabolcs Petery died of a heart attack.

The race was won by Hungary's Körös Autó Team. The G Team finished in seventh place despite having lost a full day rescuing the Artic Shamrocks team in Senegal after they crashed into a tree due to the driver falling asleep.

The Artic Shamrocks said they were relieved to eventually get towed to the finish line. “It was the toughest challenge we’ve ever taken on, we probably underestimated the preparation and level of concentration required. Would love to try again another year, but maybe not in a nissan patrol.”

=== 2024 ===
There were so many entries for the 2024 edition that organizers had to break the rally into two groups. A second group called, Budapest-Bamako Adventure Extra set out two and a half weeks after the original rally from Fez, Morocco. The route was the same except there was no competitive category. Both groups were disrupted by political unrest along the way. The first group was on high alert and had to change bivouacs in Senegal due to nationwide protests amid President Macky Sall postponing elections. For the second group the Guinean border was temporarily sealed after Mamady Doumbouya dissolved the government of Guinea. Out of the 365 teams and 1102 participants 90% crossed the finish line in Sierra Leone's capital, Freetown.

The race was won by Körös Auto Team.

=== 2025 ===
To celebrate the 20th anniversary of the Budapest-Bamako rally, organizers held a special edition of the event in 2025. This edition aimed to replicate the original 2005 route as closely as possible, though the rally concluded in Banjul, the capital of Gambia, instead of Bamako. The event saw 200 participants, including several veterans of the inaugural rally. The rally was marked by a serious incident when a competitor was bitten by a venomous snake but was saved by the rally’s medical team. The race was ultimately won by the Koros Auto Team, who claimed victory once again.

=== 2026 ===
Once again record number of participants joined the rally which ended in Freetown, Sierra Leone. The government of Sierra Leone erected a permanent finish line gate in Freetown for the rally. Hungarian heavy metal band Tankcsapda joined the Adventure Extra group of the rally and gave a concert in Dakhla, Morocco. The race was once again won by the Koros Auto Team, who announced the 2026 run as their final year of participation. "Kiskéssel vágnak neki a Bamakónak a Tankcsapda tagjai".

== Philosophy and rules ==
The guiding principle of the Budapest-Bamako is Anyone, By Anything, In Any Way. There are no restrictions on the vehicles or individuals that can enter, and no set routes. Participants have to complete daily stages between Budapest and Bamako. It is not a timed event. Points are awarded for completing daily stages in certain time periods. In addition there are geocaching challenges along the way for additional points. If a team does not complete a stage, they are still in the race. Cars do not have to arrive at the finish line, only participants. Teams can participate in racing or touring categories.

== Route ==
Usually, the race goes through the following countries from start to finish:

- Hungary
- Austria or Slovenia
- Italy
- France
- Spain
- Morocco
- Mauritania
- Mali
- Senegal
- Guinea-Bissau
- The Gambia
- Guinea
- Sierra Leone

Nearly 8,000 kilometers are covered within 15 days. The race starts in Budapest, the Hungarian capital, and generally ends in Bamako, the capital of Mali.

=== Categories ===
Teams can enter in the competitive category where navigational points need to be reached and daily stages completed. It is a point race and not a timed event. In touring category teams travel at their own pace and there is no competition. In 2011, the Spirit category was added where old cars may enter without having to pay entry fees.

== Charity ==
The Budapest-Bamako is primarily a charity event, that brings direct donations to communities in Mali and Mauritania. Many teams are delegated by firms as part of the corporate social responsibility program. In 2008, Budapest Bank donated an ambulance car after it was driven from Budapest to Bamako. The Bayer Red Cross donated a minivan for the Institute for the Blind in Bamako after it was driven from Europe.

- In 2005, money was raised for a Bamako orphanage.
- In 2007, participants adopted villages on route and delivered supplies to that community.
- In 2008, teams dug a well in the village of El Geddiya, donated medical equipment to a free clinic in a Bamako slum, including sterilization equipment and an incubator. Further educational gifts were given to schools in several Bamako districts.
- In 2009 over €700,000 worth of aid was delivered to Africa. The British "Green Knights" brought solar panels and solar ovens to several Malian villages. A Dutch women's team delivered 230 bicycles to an organization called Women on Bikes. The NGO teaches women to ride bicycles so they can get jobs away from their villages.
- In 2010 over 25 tons of aid was delivered to Mauritania and Mali. Members of the Norwegian Bamako team built a school in a remote Malian village named Kourmikoro. Aid supported several villages, hospital, orphanages, schools and clinics in both Mauritania and Mali.
- In 2011 €800,000 worth of aid was delivered. A new building was added to the school built in 2010 and a new well was dug in Diema, Mali. Members of the JCI team delivered 10,000 mosquito nets to Mali and Senegal.
- In 2012 €600,000 worth of aid was delivered. Several ambulances were donated to Guinea-Bissau. A new school wing was built in Kourmikoro, Mali. Donations also supported the village of Sincem Boce, Guinea-Bissau, the orphanage and hospital in Bissau.
- In 2013 €800,000 worth of aid was delivered. A Danish team donated a fully functional fire engine to the mayor of Guinea-Bissau. Solar powered vaccination storage systems, computers, sewing machines and bicycles were also donated in Mauritania, Senegal and Guinea Bissau.
- In 2014 €750,000 worth of aid was delivered. A Belgian team donated complete hospital equipment. The Belgian military flew a plane with 2,000 kilograms of medical aid to Banjul to the finish line of the rally.
- In 2015 €800,000 worth of aid was delivered. A new wing was added to a school that the rally had built in 2010. The school system of the Cherifula slum of Bamako received the bulk of the aid.
- In 2016 €600,000 worth of aid was delivered. A radio station was built to promote gender equality in the village of Diema
- In 2020 €900,000 A fruit orchard was planted in Sierra Leone. A Romanian team delivered 5000 school bags full of supplies to schoolchildren. A school was renovated.
- In 2022 €800,000 worth of aid was delivered. A solar electricity system got added to the Emil Torday Elementary school in Masiaka. Additional 2000 fruit trees were planted in the village of Masiaka. Educational supplies were delivered to schools and orphanages in Senegal, Guinea and Mauritania.

The team that performs the most outstanding charity work receives the Mother Teresa Charity Award.

== Television and film coverage ==
Since 2007, British cable and satellite broadcaster, Travel Channel airs the Budapest To Bamako series. Since 2008, the channel sends viewers to participate in the rally. In 2009, the series grew to five parts and followed the trials and tribulations of an all men and an all women team along the rally. In 2010, Hungarian national broadcaster RTL Klub broadcast the event daily. Since 2007, RTL Klub covers the event annually.

In 2022 a feature-length documentary, entitled Rust To Glory covered the event. The film portrays three junk cars transformation from being destitute to participating in the rally. The second half of the movie features their trials and tribulation along the way. The movie is streamed by Amazon and Apple TV worldwide and RTL Plusz in Hungary.

== Gallery ==
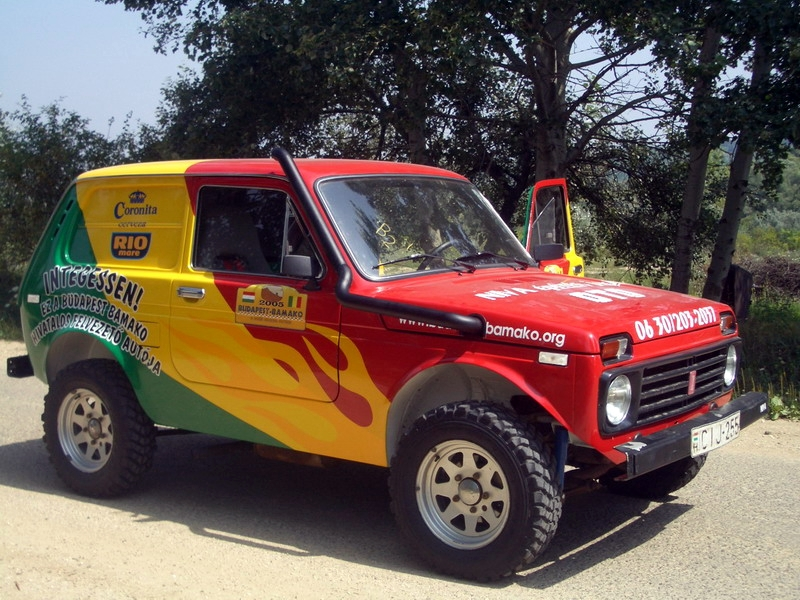
The 2005 official pace car was a refurbished 1988 Lada Niva

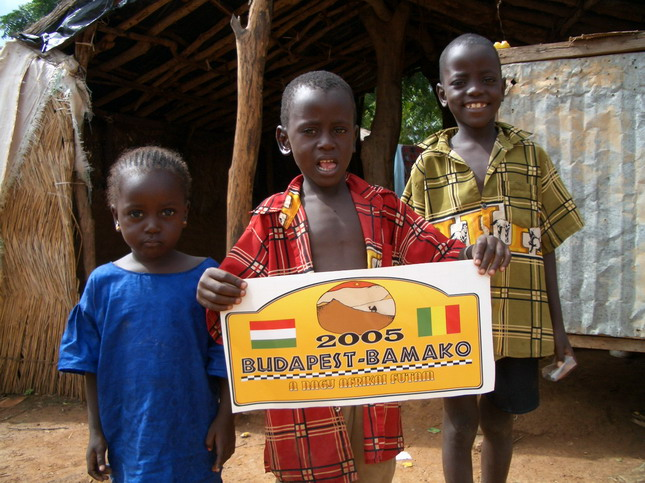
Children welcoming the Budapest-Bamako in Mahina, Mali

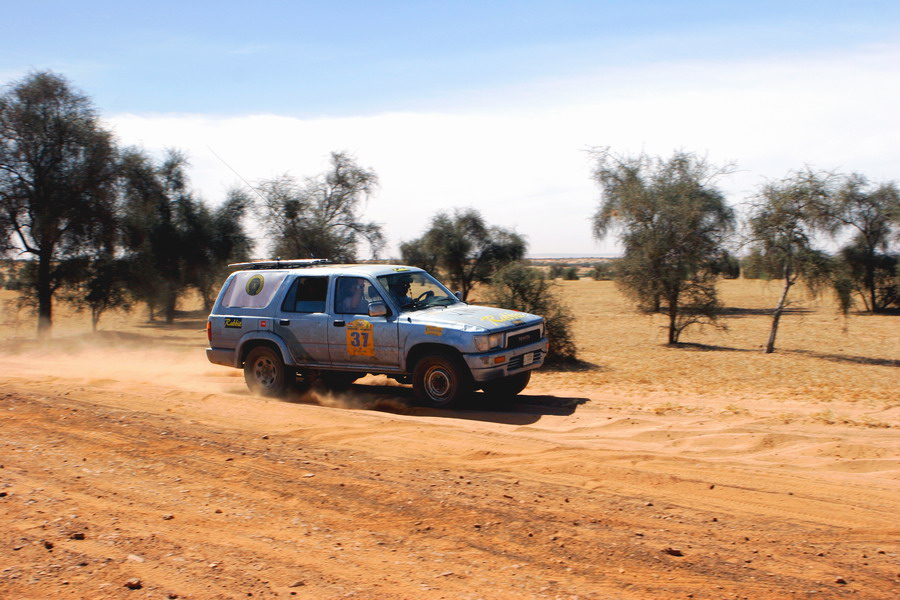
A 20-year-old Toyota 4Runner dashing through the sand

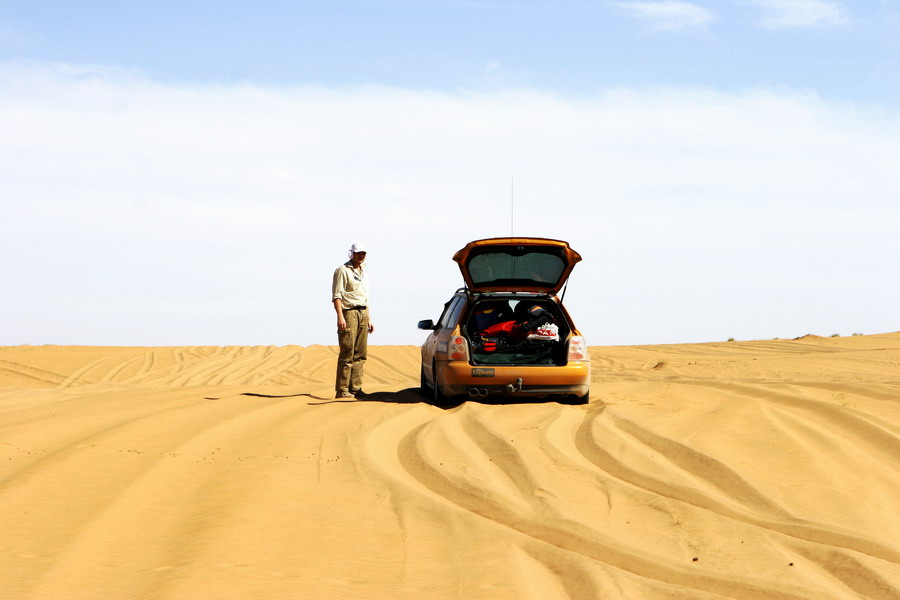
A desperate moment in the Sahara. An Audi A4 Avant gets captured by the soft desert sands.

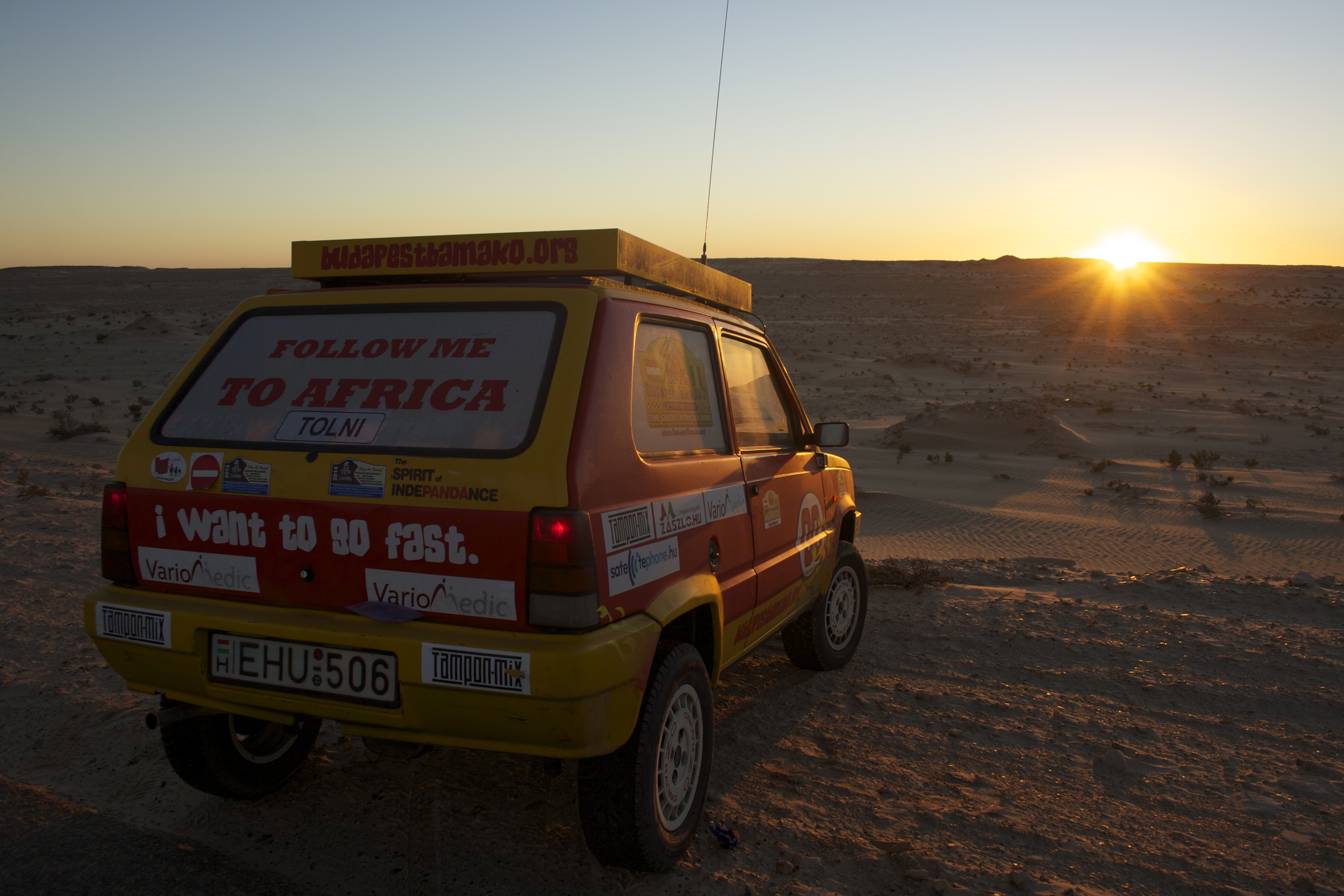
A Fiat Panda 4×4 is awaiting the morning start at one of the Mauritanian camps of the rally.

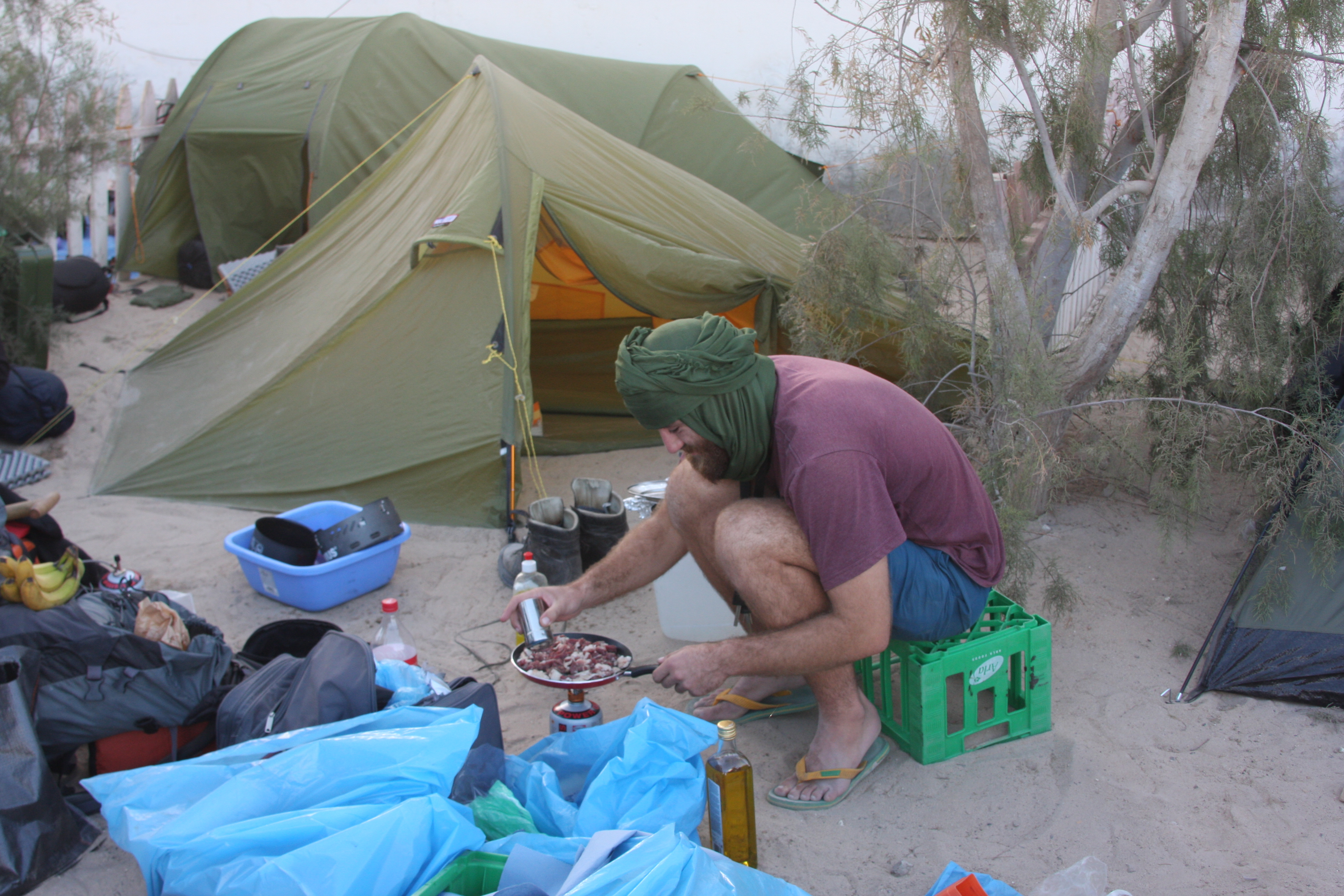
After long and difficult stages participants have to prepare their own meals and spend the nights in tents

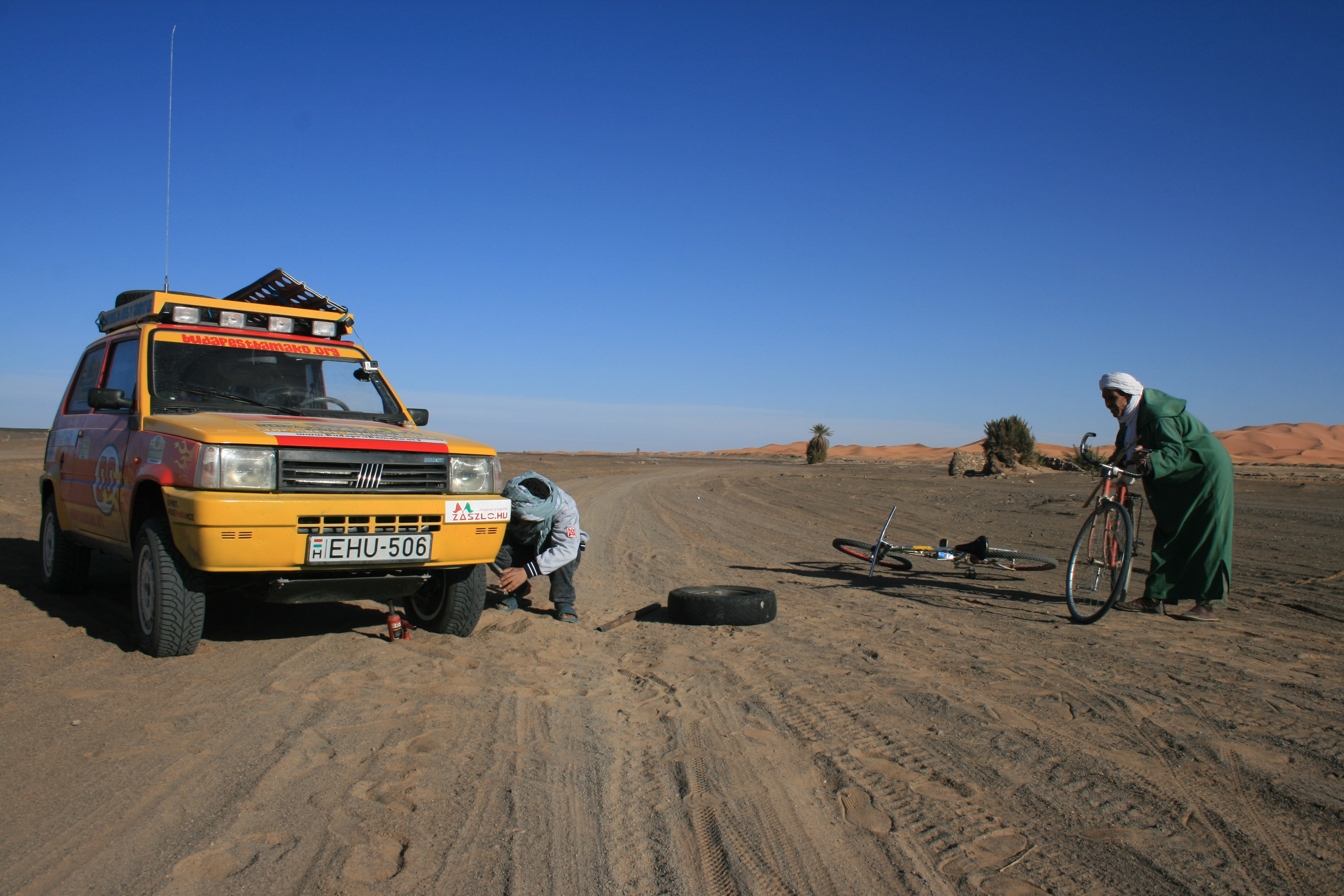
Local touaregs assisting a rally participant with a flat tyre on one of the Moroccan stages of the Budapest-Bamako

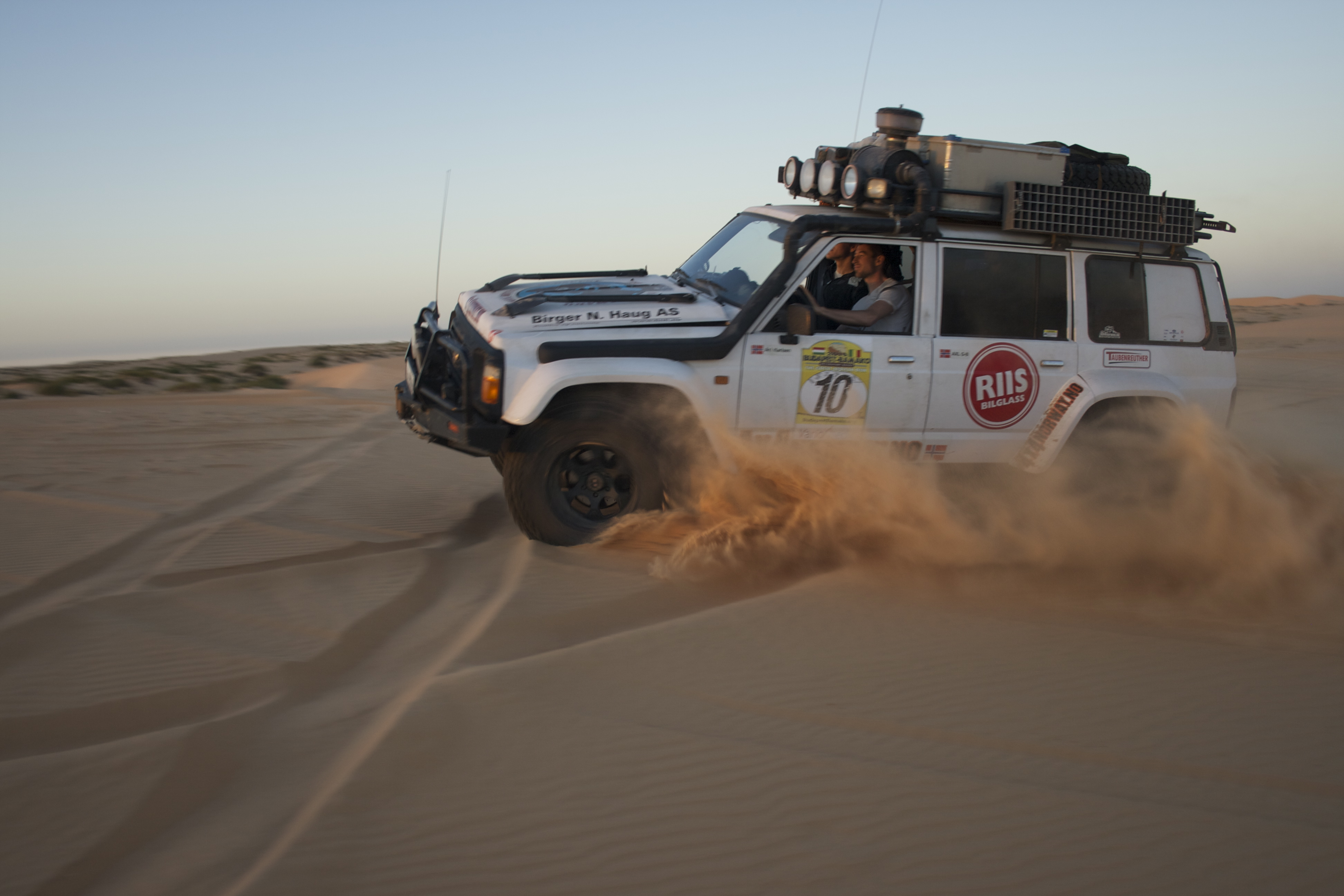
A Norwegian rally team is trying to complete one of the more difficult stages of the Budapest-Bamako rally in 2014

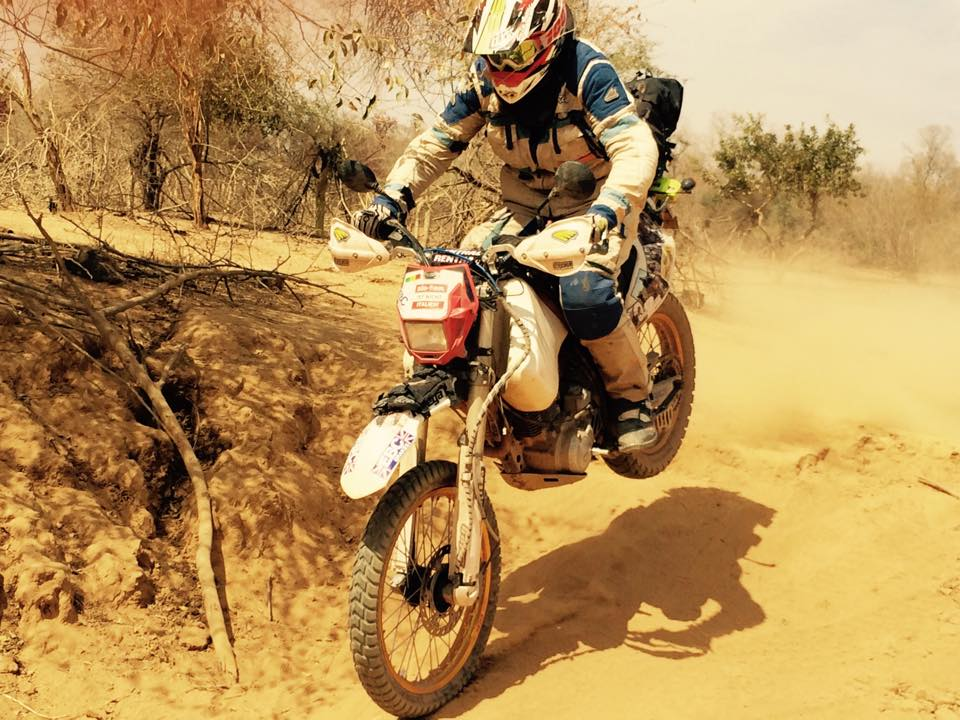
Budapest-Bamako 2015

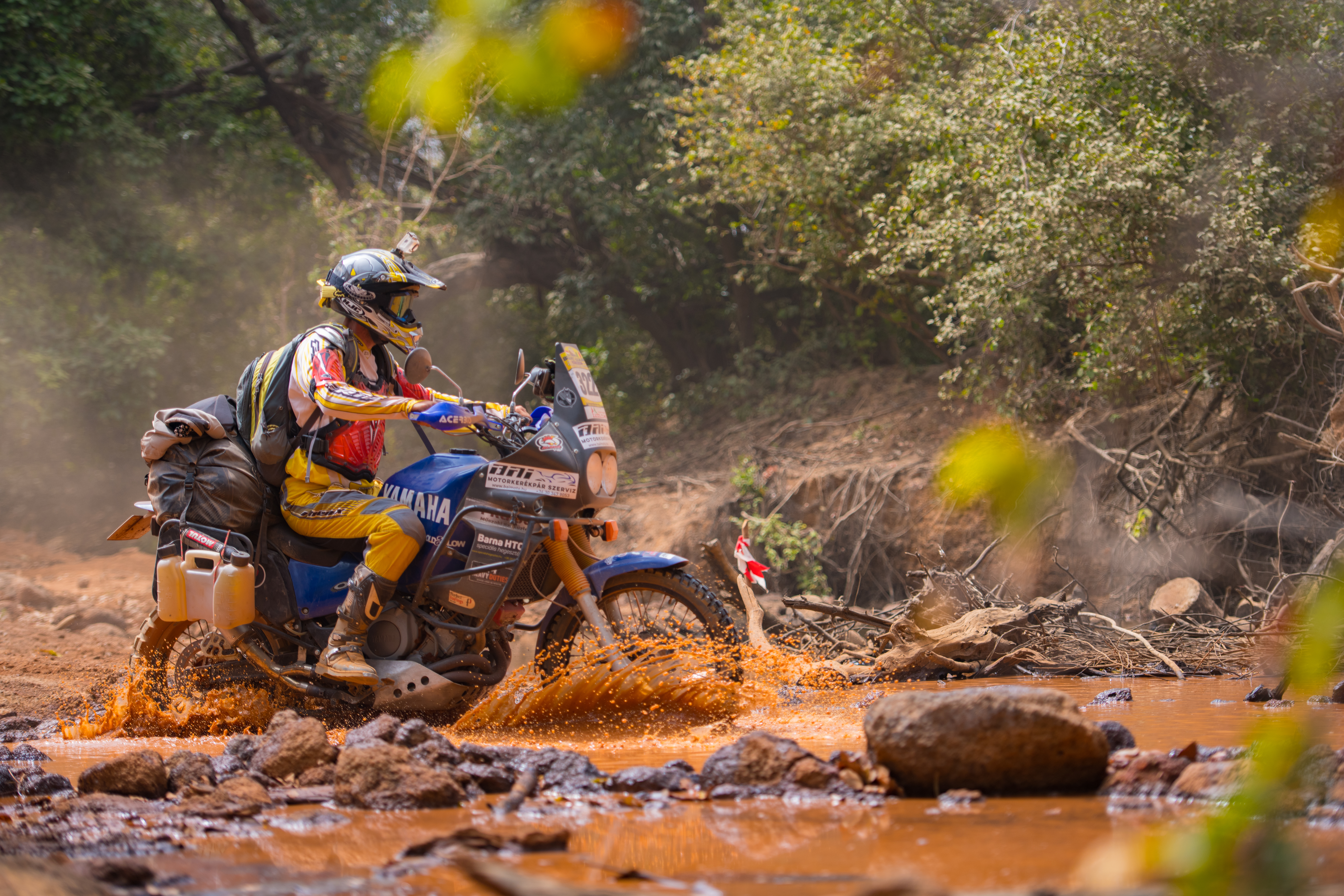
River crossing in Guinea 2020

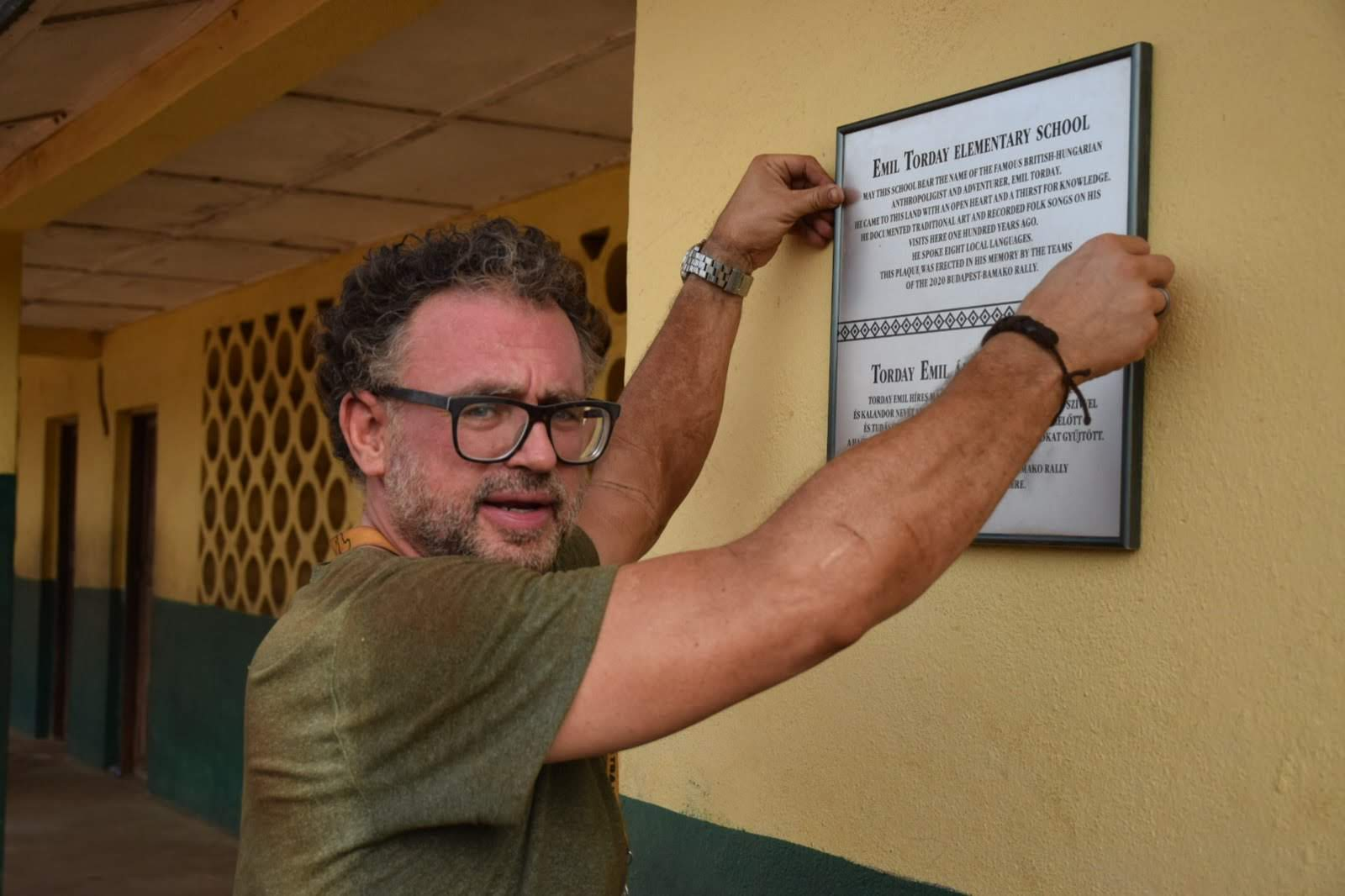
A school is named after British-Hungarian ethongrapher, anthropologist, Emil Torday in Sierra Leone.

A participant crosses the finish line of the 2026 Budapest-Bamako Rally in Freetown, Sierra Leone.

== See also ==
- Baja 4000
- Plymouth-Banjul Challenge
- Charity rally
- Te Te rally
