= Złombol =

Polish rally car racing charity event

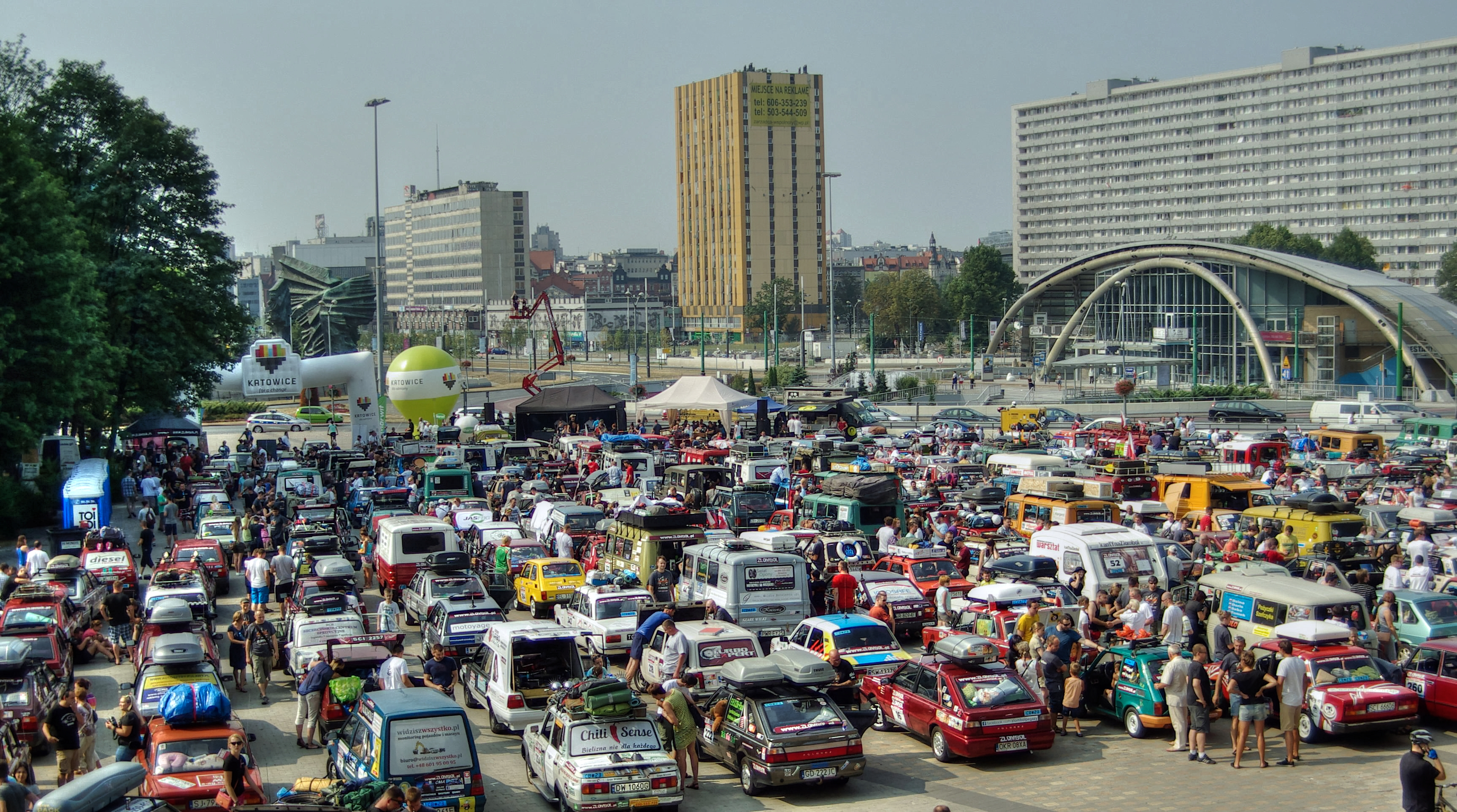
Start line in 2015

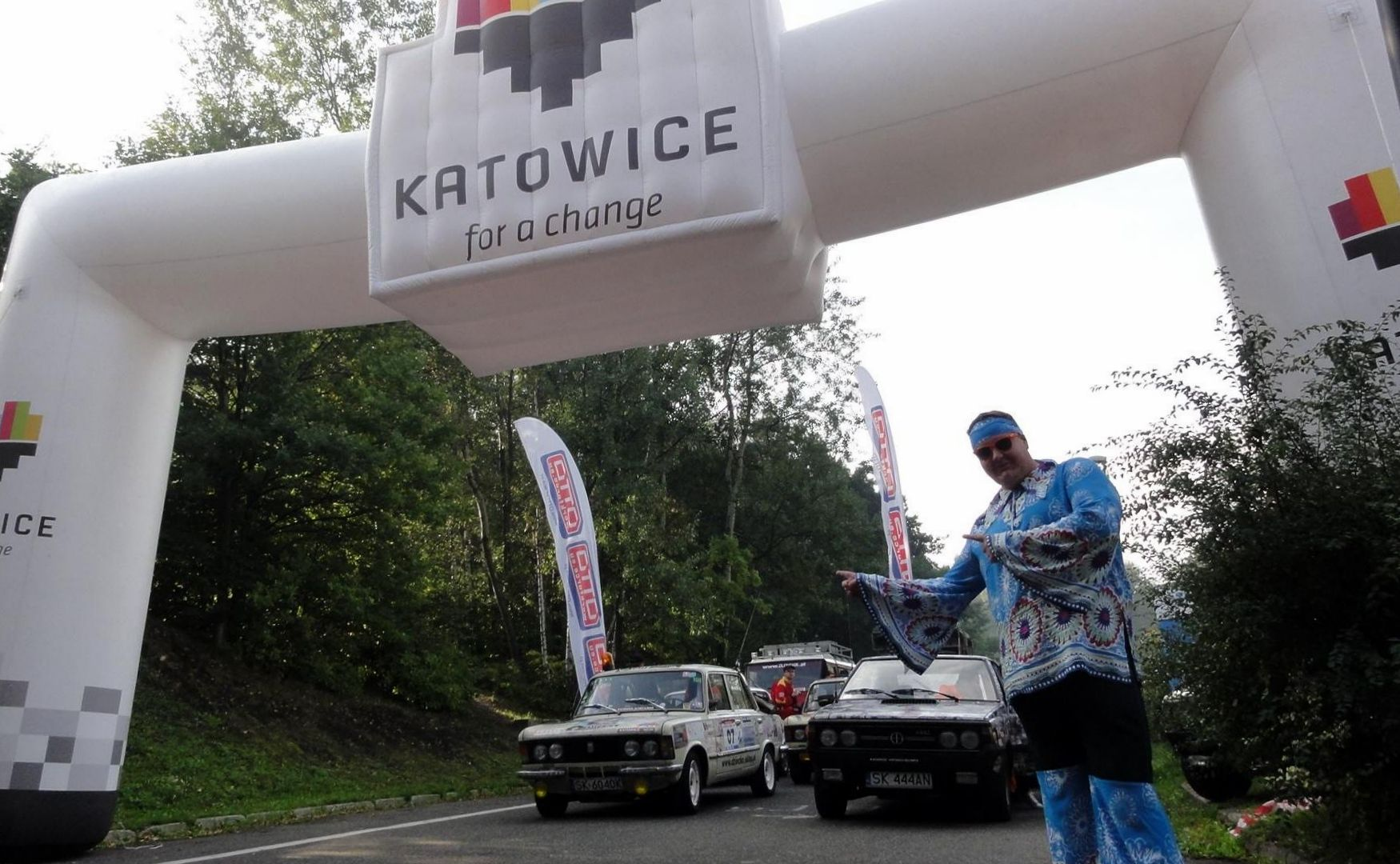
Start line in 2014

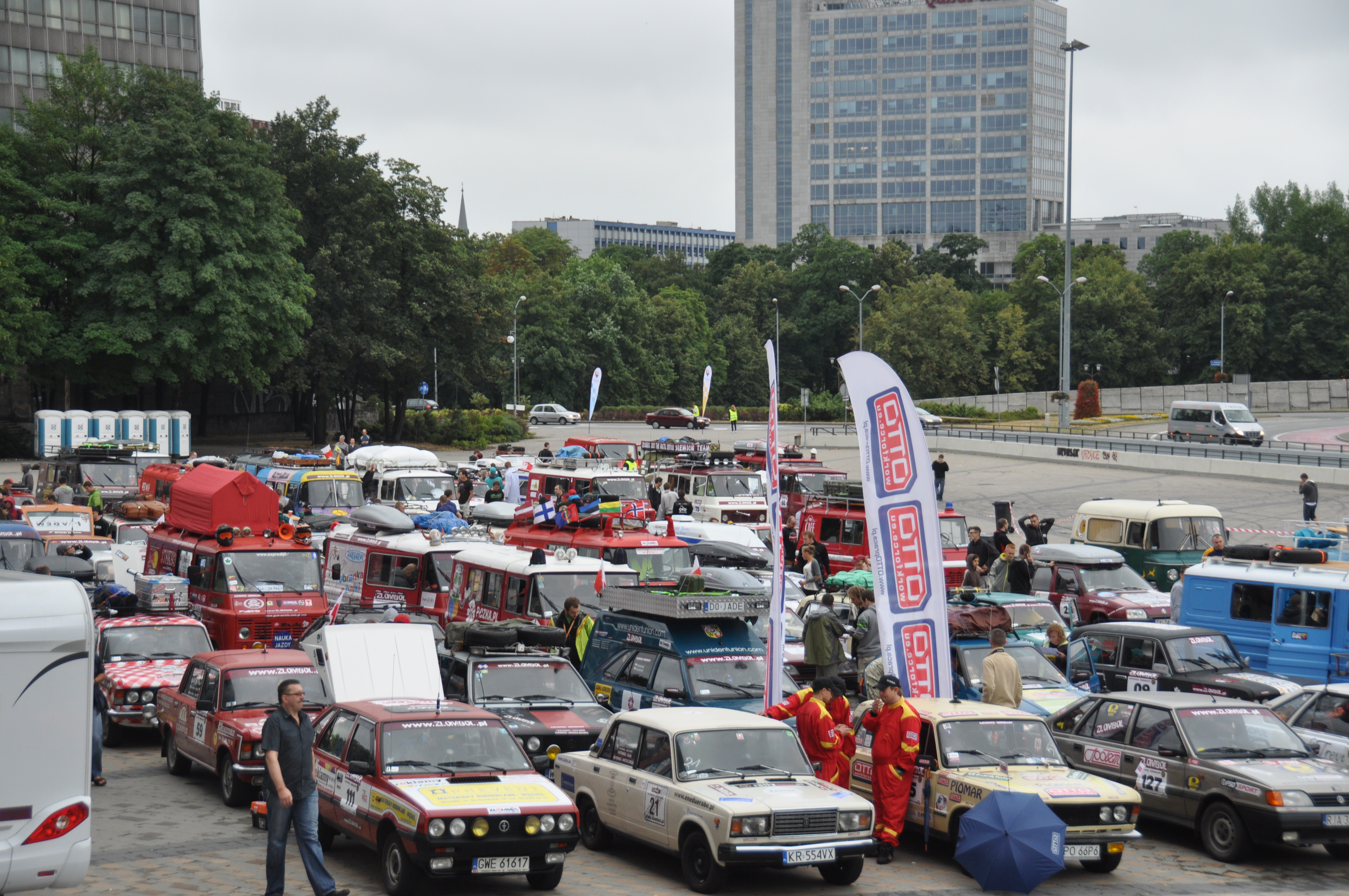
Start line in 2013

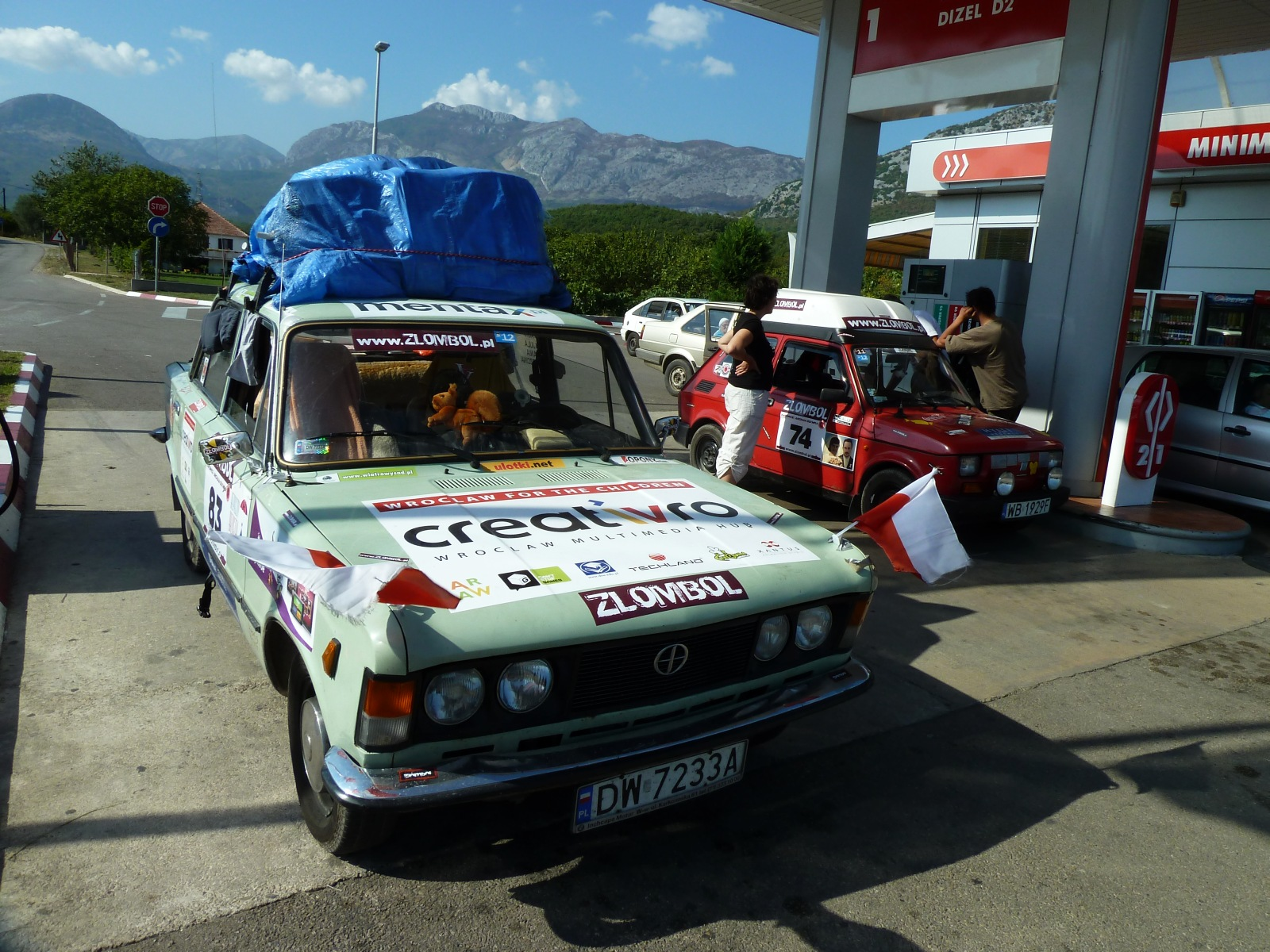
Polski Fiat 125p - Złombol 2012

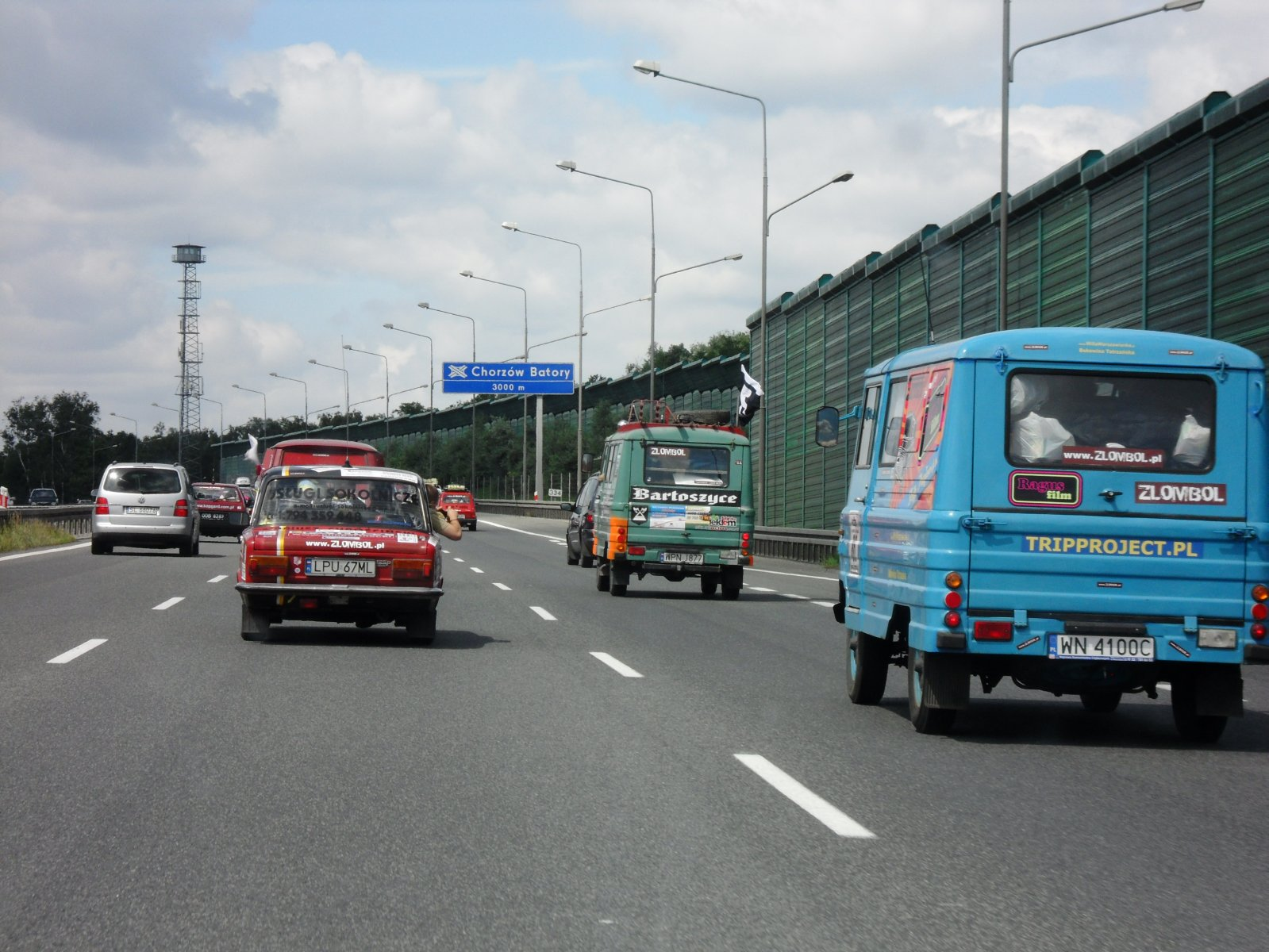
Żuk - Złombol 2011

Złombol (English "junkbol"; "złom" means junk) is a charity car rallying event with a starting point in Poland. The goal of the rally is to finish about 2500 km over a number of stages using a car that was built or designed during the communist era. The rally takes place each year in July, August or September. The starting point is always Katowice.

The 2015 event has been called the largest charity car rally in Europe. The 2020 event has been postponed for 2021, due to the COVID-19 pandemic.

== History ==
The rally was conceived in 2007 by two friends as an idea to travel a very long distance in a very old car, and to use that event to gather funds for an orphanage. In the first event there were only two teams.

Year	Teams	Teams finished	Destination	Gathered funds	Date
2007	2	2	Monte Carlo	12 792.77 zł (3 198,19 EUR)	N/A
2008	13	11	Monte Carlo	37 631.55 zł (9 407,89 EUR)	04.09.2008 - 07.09.2008
2009	21	17	Arctic Circle	43 989.08 zł (10 997,27 EUR)	04.07.2009 - 08.07.2009
2010	121	107	Istanbul	172 328.33 zł (43 082,08 EUR)	04.09.2010 - 07.09.2010
2011	134	102	Loch Ness	231 791.42 zł (57 947,86 EUR)	23.07.2011 - 27.07.2011
2012	206	167	Archaia Olympia	346 584.42 zł (86 646,11 EUR)	15.09.2012 - 19.09.2012
2013	147	110	Nordkapp	302 738.73 zł (75 684,68 EUR)	10.08.2013 - 14.08.2013
2014	401	310	Lloret de Mar	676 736,97 zł (169 184,24 EUR)	13.09.2014 - 17.09.2014
2015	392	N/A	Stelvio Pass	734 868,06 zł (183 717,01 EUR)	15.08.2015 - 18.08.2015
2016	510	N/A	Tunisia via Palermo	1 070 953,16 zł (267 738,29 EUR)	25.09.2016 - 29/30.09.2016
2017	530	N/A	Noja	1 128 845,63 zł (282 211,41 EUR)	02.09.2017 - 06.09.2017
2018	836	700	Sithonia	1 866 050,13 zł (466 512,53 EUR)	01.09.2018 - 05.09.2018
2019	450	N/A	Dublin	1 322 255,64 zł (310 351,71 EUR)	28.06.2019 - 03.07.2019
~~2020~~	Edition (20–24 June) postponed for 2021 due to the COVID-19 pandemic restrictions.				
2021	TBD	TBD	Burhaniye	TBD	26.06.2021–TBD
2022	Unknown	Unknown	Unknown	Unknown	Unknown
2023	487	~300	Nazaré	2 746 654,46 zł	01.07.2023-05.07.2023
2024	Unknown	Unknown	Atlantic Ocean Road	Unknown	29.06.2024-03.07.2024
2025	Unknown	Unknown	Giresun	Unknown	09.07.2025-10.07.2025

1 EUR = 4.25 zł (as of 08/08/2025)

== Charity ==
Teams taking part in the rally are gathering money for orphanages by selling advertising space on their cars. Each team has to acquire donors to reach a target amount specified each year by the organisers. Teams are self-funded and no sponsorship is allowed.

Additional donations, without selling ad space, are allowed. The gathered amount of money is used for supporting orphanages.

== The rally ==
Złombol is an extreme rally. Teams have no support or help from the organisers. The organisers only suggest places or camping spots for a night's rest. Each team takes part at their own expense and risk.

Only cars manufactured in the former Eastern Bloc (during the communist era or after the transformation of 1989, but having roots in the former) are allowed to take part in the competition. The car should be bought for less than 1000 zł (about 320 USD), but slight alterations are allowed.

Participants drive on public roads, either travel in small groups or individually, whatever the team's preference is. For each stage starting and destination points are specified with teams free to choose the travel route between those two points.

After reaching the finish line, each team travels back to their own homes.
