= Te Te rally =

TeTe Rally رالي تي تي الصحراوي
- Status: Active
- Genre: Desert motor sporting event
- Frequency: Annual
- Locations: Waddan, Libya
- Country: Libya
- Years active: 2015–present
- Inaugurated: 2015

The TeTe Rally, also widely known as the Desert TeTe Rally, is an annual motorsports event held in the oasis town of Waddan, within Al Jufra District in Libya. The event features thrilling off-road races across rugged desert and mountainous tracks, showcasing everything from 4x4 vehicles to high-performance motorcycles. First launched in 2015, the rally has steadily grown into a major gathering that attracts passionate racers from all over Libya, alongside international and Arab competitors, complemented by a vibrant lineup of cultural and entertainment festivities.

== Gallery ==
Rally atmosphere
