= PK Carsport =

Car racing team

(Belgium) PK Carsport
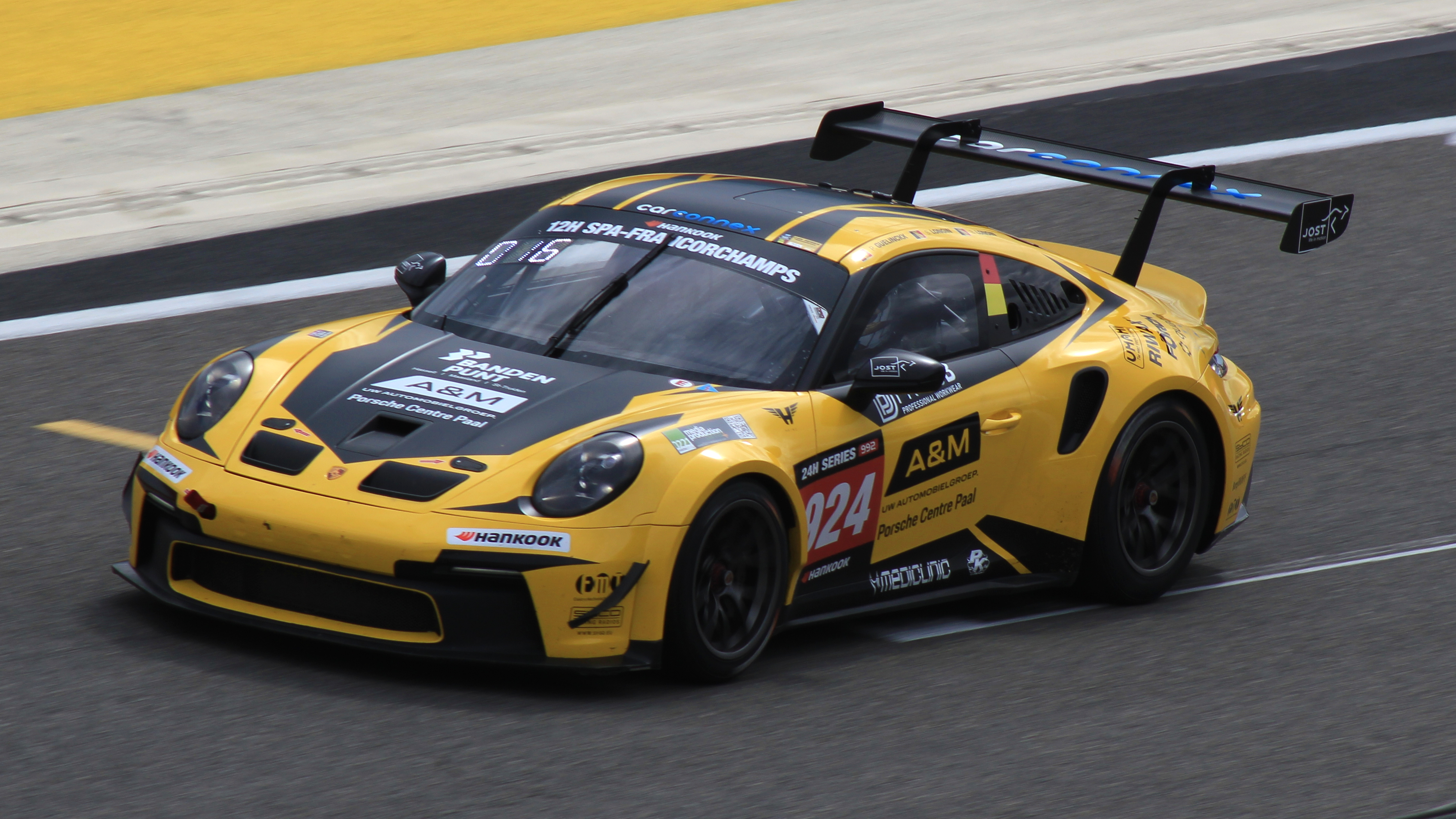
- Founded: 1968 (as PEKA Racing); 1997 (as GLPK Racing); 2004 (as PK Carsport)
- Founder(s): Paul Kumpen
- Base: Hasselt, Limburg
- Current series: NASCAR Euro Series; Belcar Trophy
- Former series: FIA GT Championship
- Current drivers: NASCAR Euro Series – PRO: 13. Thomas Krasonis; 24. Vittorio Ghirelli; NASCAR Euro Series – OPEN: 24. Thomas Dombrowski; Belcar Trophy: 1. Frank Thiers, Hans Thiers, Jeffrey van Hooydonk, Gilles Magnus
- Drivers' Championships: NASCAR Euro Series – Elite 1 / PRO (2014, 2016, 2020, 2022, 2024, 2025); NASCAR Euro Series – Elite 2 / OPEN (2014, 2016, 2025); 24 Hours of Zolder (1994-1996, 2000, 2002-2004, 2021, 2022); Belcar (1999, 2002, 2003, 2006, 2021); Belgian Racing Car Championship (2013)
- Website: http://www.pk-carsport.com/

Pekaracing NV
- Type: NV
- Industry: Automotive industry
- Founded: September 1, 1995; 31 years ago in Hasselt, Limburg, Belgium
- Headquarters: Bedrijfsstraat 17, Hasselt, Belgium
- Operating income: ▼€ -158.384 (2015)
- Net income: ▼€ -259.782 (2015)
- Total assets: ▼€ 152.739 (2015)
- Total equity: € 1.480.710 (2015)
- Owner: Paul Kumpen; Andrea Baer; Anthony Kumpen
- Number of employees: 3 (2015)

Pekaracing NV, competing as PK Carsport, is a racing team that currently competes in the NASCAR Euro Series as well as the Belcar Trophy in conjunction with Russell Racing. The team has previously competed in other series such as the FIA GT Championship.

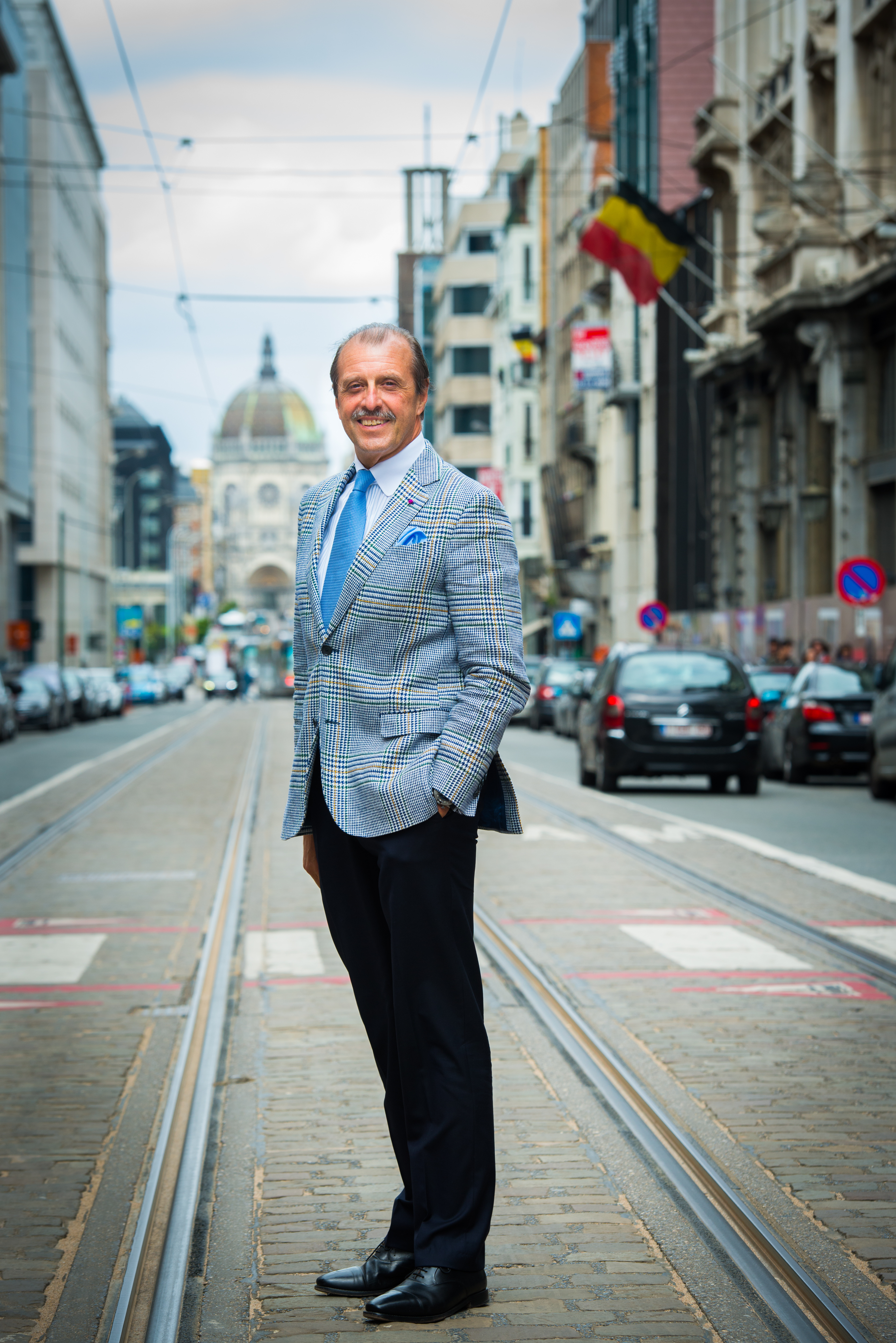
PK Carsport founder Paul Kumpen in 2015

== History ==
PK Carsport has a long history in Belgian autosport. In 1968 PEKA Racing was founded by racing driver Paul Kumpen. Besides racing Kumpen was an entrepreneur and partial owner of Ridley Bikes. The team initially started in rallycross. In 1989, 1990 and 1991 Kumpen participated in the Dutch and Belgian rounds of the FIA European Rallycross Championship. Racing at the Duivelsbergcircuit, Glossocircuit and Mandescircuit and the Dutch Eurocircuit. He scored his best result in 1990 at the Eurocircuit, finishing in ninth place in Division 2.

After rallycross, the team entered the Formula Opel Euroseries with Jean-François Hemroulle and Oscar Middeldorp in 1992. In 1994 and 1995, the team with Middeldorp switched to the Formula Renault running Alpa chassis. Middeldorp ended up eighth in the final standings in 1994 in the Eurocup. David Saelens joined the team in 1995. In 1995, Paul Kumpen, Albert Vanierschot and Georges Cremer won the 24 Hours of Zolder in a Porsche 993.

In 1997 PEKA Racing merged with GL Racing, a racing team formed in 1992 by Ghislain Lenaers, to form GLPK Racing. In 1998 it entered the short-lived GTR Euroseries, winning the Misano Gold Cup. Kumpen shared the Porsche 911 GT2 with Stéphane Cohen and Charles Margueron. The team scored another podium finish at the Nürburgring.

=== Belcar ===
In 1998 Kurt Thiers and Vincent Vosse competed in the Belgian Belcar championship. The duo scored three podium finished and secured the third place in the championship standings in their Porsche 911. The following year, the team entered a Porsche 993 Turbo for Anthony Kumpen and Stephane Cohen. The team dominated, winning three times at Zolder and once at Spa. The team secured the championship 120 points clear of the number two, Cor Euser and Herman Buurman. For 2000, the team combined their FIA GT and Belcar championships using the Chrysler Viper GTS-R in both series. Despite winning six out of eight races, including the 24 Hours of Zolder, the championship was decided in the last round at Zolder in October. Kumpen and Cohen retired early in the race and as Albert Vanierschot and Bert Longin won the race and the championship over GLPK Racing. The 2001 Bert Longin and former motocross racer Eric Geboers won two races in the Belcar championship. Longin was the best placed GLPK Racing driver in twelfth place in the championship. The following season PK Carsport dominated Belgium's premier racing series. Four PK Carsport drivers placed in the top four of the championship. Bert Longin scored most points, followed by David Hart, Anthony Kumpen and Vincent Dupont. All races were won by one or the other GLPK Chrysler Vipers. In 2003, all but one races were won by GLPK Racing, one race was won by Paul Belmondo Racing. Of the GLPK Racing drivers, Anthony Kumpen was declared series champion. After a partial season in 2005, GLPK Racing won the championship again in 2006. Kumpen and Longin won five races and finished third in the 24 Hours of Zolder. Therefore, the team, now racing a Corvette, won the championship. For 2007 the Belcar championship was reorganized and SRO Belgium took over. Kumpen scored two wins and again clinched the championship. As the original Belcar championship ceased to exist, PK Carsport backed out of the championship.

=== FIA GT Championship ===
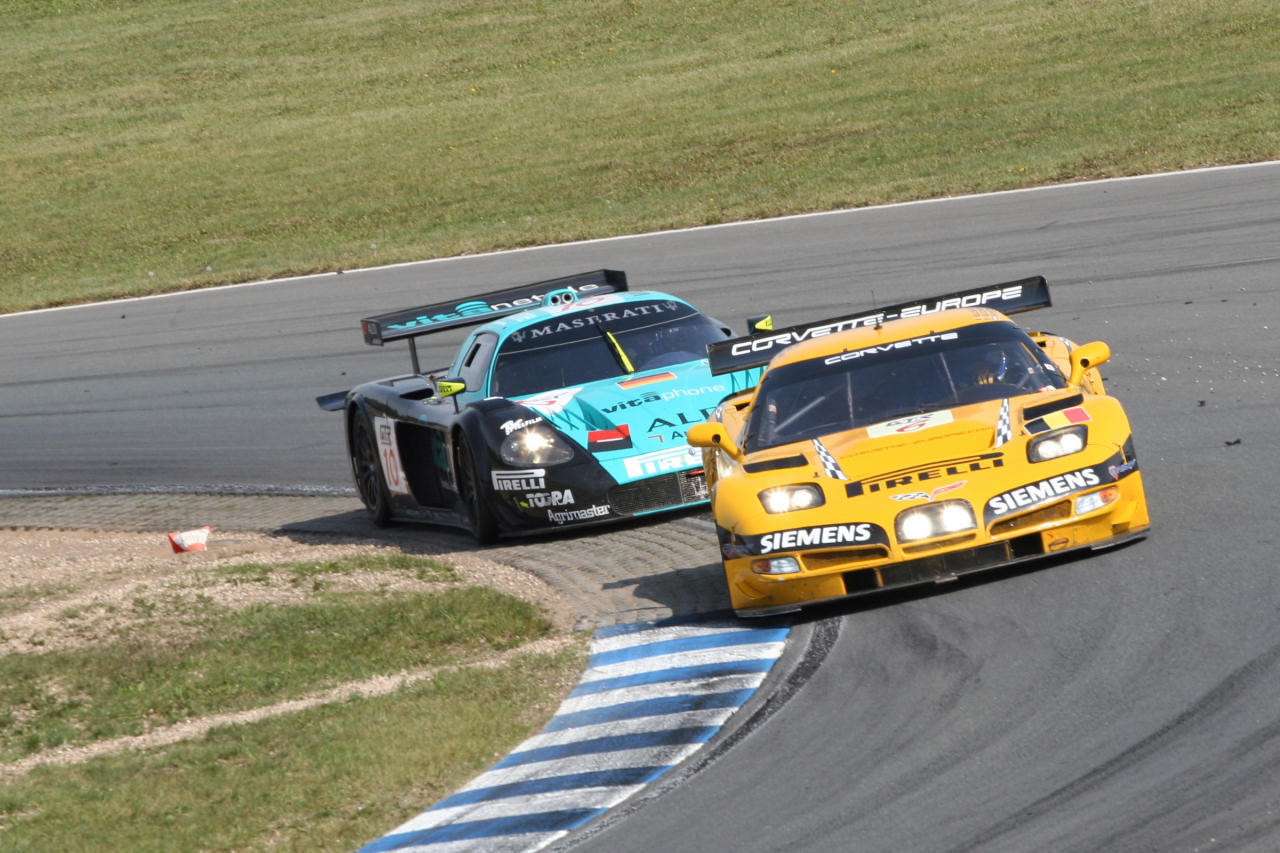
PK Carsport racing at Oschersleben in 2005

In 2004 GLPK Racing joined forces with Carsport Holland, the team run by Mike Hezemans, changing its name to PK Carsport. The team entered the prestigious FIA GT Championship in 2005. Bert Longin, Anthony Kumpen, Mike Hezemans won two races, the 2005 FIA GT Zhuhai Supercar 500 and 2005 FIA GT Imola Supercar 500. The Chevrolet Corvette C5-R team ended up fourth in the season standings. The following year the same drivers finished fifth in the season standings winning at the 2006 FIA GT Paul Ricard 500km. In 2007, Ghislain Lenaers resigned from GLPK Racing, leaving the team PK Racing, later renamed to PK Carsport. In 2007, the union between Carsport Holland and PK Carsport ended. PK Carsport continued in the FIA GT Championship. At the 2007 Spa 24 Hours, the team signed Kurt Mollekens and Frédéric Bouvy besides their regular drivers Kumpen and Longin. The team failed to win a race in the whole season, finishing fifth in the standings, behind Carsport Holland. For 2008, PK Carsport switched cars. The team attracted the Saleen S7-R to race. The team's performance was variable. The team initially struggled to score points but won the season finale at the Potrero de los Funes Circuit. Hezemans returned in 2009 to race in the final 'old' style FIA GT championship. The team also returned to the Chevrolet Corvette, upgrading to the C6.R type. The team won the races at Oschersleben and the 24 Hours of Spa. However, the season came to a dramatic end at Zolder (the team's home track). Battling for the championship the Vitaphone Racing team won the race at Zolder. However, PK Carsport filed an appeal as they claimed the Vitaphone team breached the pitstop regulations. However, after an investigation, the PK Carsport team was disqualified for a technical infringement. Both Vitaphone Racing and PK Carsport were invited to enter the 2010 24 Hours of Le Mans. PK Carsport was on the initial entry list but later withdrew.

=== Pagani Zonda GR ===
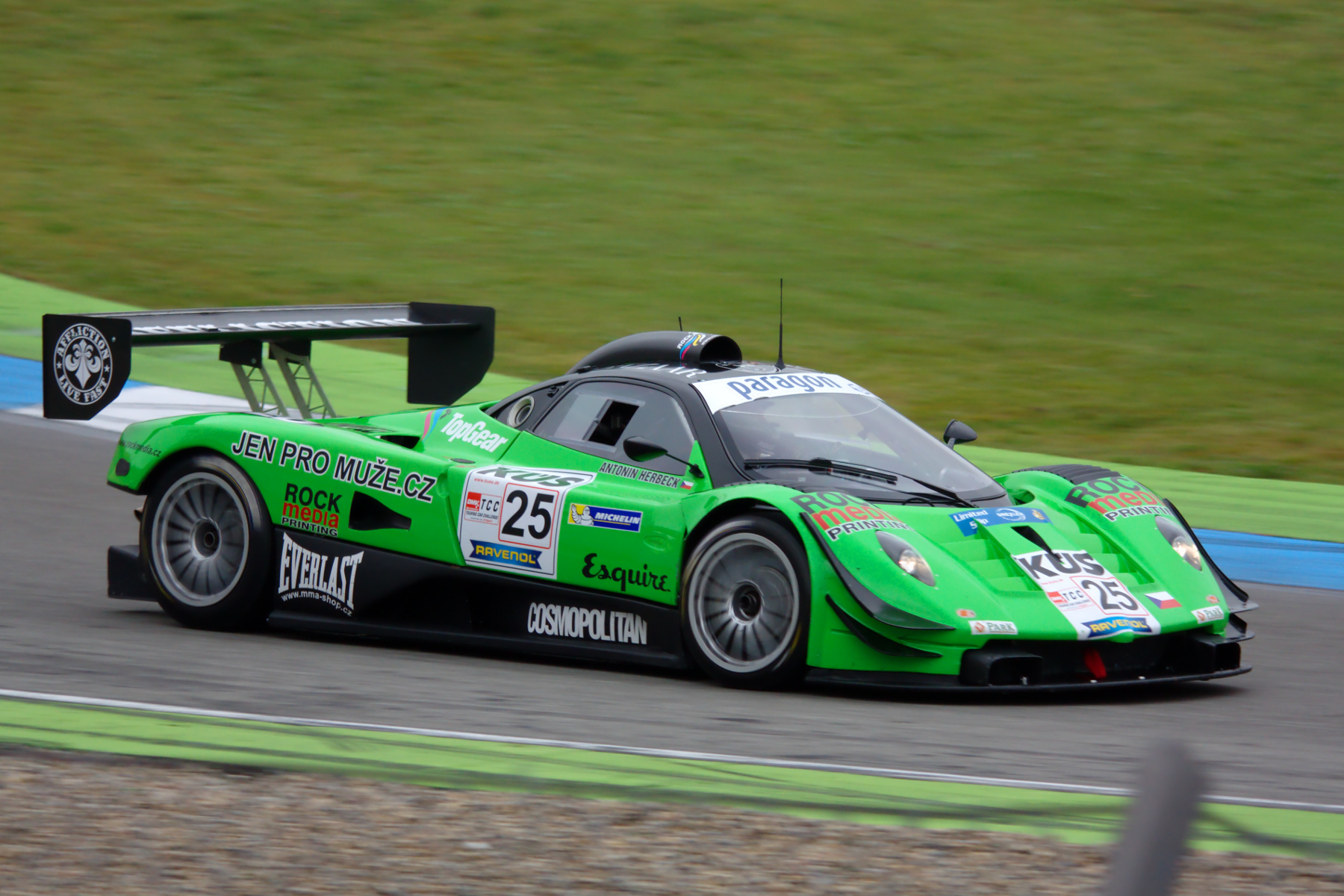
Herbeck racing the Zonda GR at the Hockenheimring

Paul Kumpen, along with Tom Weickardt, owner of American Viperacing and Toine Hezemans, owner of Carsport Holland, was requested by Pagani to develop a racing version of Pagani Zonda C12. S. Kumpen, Weickardt and Hezemans founded a new company, Carsport Zonda, to develop the new car. One Pagani Zonda GR was completed a few months after development started at the Modena headquarters of Carsport Zonda. While the car used the original carbon fiber chassis, front and rear diffusers were added to the bodywork. The engine was also updated leading to better performance.

Under the Carsport America entry, the car was entered in the 2003 24 Hours of Le Mans. Mike Hezemans, Anthony Kumpen and David Hart were selected as its drivers. During the initial tests, the car placed the 36th time, eleventh in the GTS class. The Pagani qualified 32nd, ninth in class. However, the race for the car was only ten laps long. After ten laps the Xtrac gearbox failed after which the car retired.

After Le Mans, the car was intended to enter the final round of the Belcar championship by GLPK Racing. Due to a missing vital component to the engine, the car never raced in the championship. The car was sold to Czech gentleman racer Antonin Herbeck. In 2012 the car suffered a vicious crash at Autodrom Most. Jan Vonka, in an Audi A4 DTM, attempted a pass for the lead in the race on Herbeck. The two cars touched and the Zonda GR hit a concrete wall and was nearly destroyed in the crash. The car was later repaired and raced again in the DMV Gran Turismo Touring Car Cup among other series.

=== Racing for Holland ===
One year after the Pagani Zonda GR disappointment, the PK Carsport team returned to Le Mans in 2004. The Belgian team ran the Racing for Holland Dome S101. Tom Coronel, Justin Wilson and Ralph Firman were the drivers for the LMP1 entry. The car qualified tenth for the most famous 24 hour race. The team had to retire with an ignition problem to their Judd GV4 4.0L V10 engine.

=== Superleague Formula ===
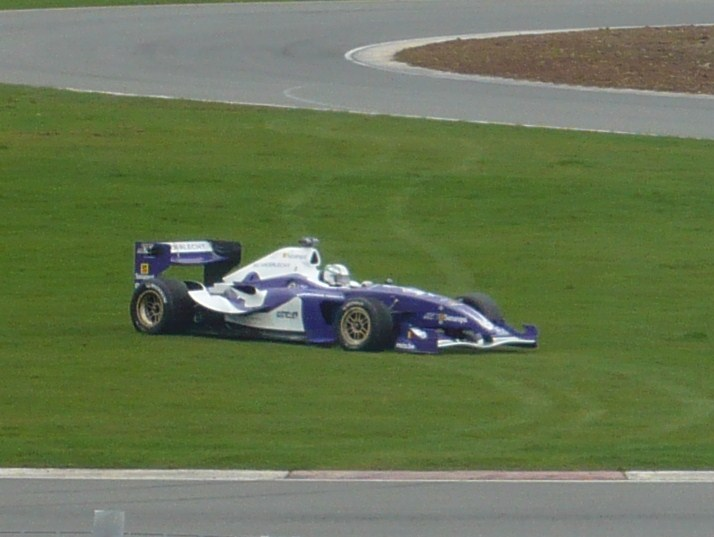
Davide Rigon at Silverstone in 2010.

Belgian football club, R.S.C. Anderlecht, was active in the Superleague Formula between 2008 and 2010. During the three seasons, the team was run subsequently by Team Astromega in 2008, Zakspeed in 2009, and Azerti Motorsport in 2010. Azerti Motorsport, led by Wim Coekelbergs, was supported by PK Carsport entering the Panoz DP09 for racing driver Davide Rigon. PK Carsport provided Azerti Motorsport with car maintenance and technical support. Management and engineering are in the hands of Azerti Motorsport. The cooperation proved very successful. Rigon won races at Assen, Zolder and Adria. Rigon won his second Superleague Formula championship in 2010. After a troubled 2011 season, in which only two rounds were run, the Superleague Formula folded.

=== Return to Belgian racing ===
After the Belgian GT Championship folded, the series was revamped as the Belgian Racing Car Championship. In the endurance championship, PK Carsport entered an Audi R8 LMS for Anthony Kumpen, Bert Longin and Maarten Makelberge. The team won the first round at Zolder and in total scored podium finishes in five out of six races. The team won the championship in 2013.

=== NASCAR Whelen Euro Series ===
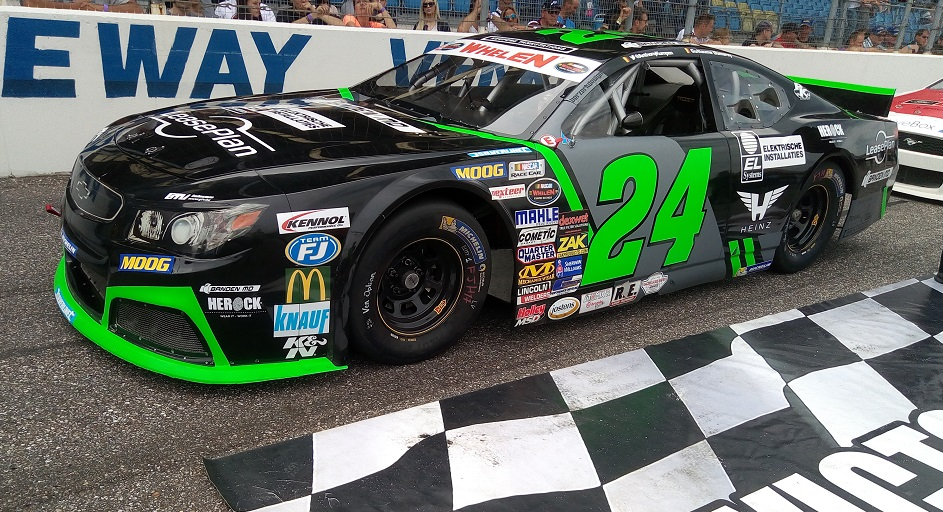
Kumpen's car after winning at Raceway Venray in 2017

In early 2014 PK Carsport announced it would enter the NASCAR Whelen Euro Series. Bert Longin and Anthony Kumpen entered the Elite 1 division. Maxime Dumarey raced the Elite 2 division full-time while the other car featured various drivers. At the first race in Valencia, Longin scored the pole position. Longin and Kumpen finished second and third in the race while Yann Zimmer won. Kumpen was a constant top ten finisher. He eventually won one race, at the Le Mans Bugatti Circuit. Kumpen won the championship by one point at the final round over multiple series champion Ander Vilariño. In the Elite 2 division, Dumarey was very successful. Despite winning only one race, he won the championship. The team struggled the following season. Kumpen crashed twice, at Raceway Venray (first race) and Tours Speedway. The Belgian driver also won the second race at Raceway Venray. Kumpen placed fourth in the series championship. In Elite 2 Stienes Longin, son of Elite 1 driver Bert, had a strong debut season. Longin was a regular top-five finisher and also a winner at Tours. He placed fourth in the season standings.

== Motorsports results ==
=== Complete FIA GT Championship results ===
(key) (Races in bold indicate pole position) (Races in italics indicate fastest lap)

FIA GT Championship
Year	Car	Engine	Drivers	1	2	3	4	5	6	7	8	9	10	11	Pos.	Pts
1999	Chrysler Viper GTS-R	Chrysler 8.0L V10	(Belgium) Vincent Vosse	(Italy); MNZ; 5	(United Kingdom); SIL; 3	(Germany); HOC; DNF		(Belgium); ZOL; 14	(Germany); OSC; DNF	(United Kingdom); DON; 4	(United States); HOM	(United States); GLN	(China); ZHU		7th	9
1999	Chrysler Viper GTS-R	Chrysler 8.0L V10	(Belgium) Didier Defourny	(Italy); MNZ; 5	(United Kingdom); SIL; 3	(Germany); HOC; DNF		(Belgium); ZOL; 14	(Germany); OSC; DNF	(United Kingdom); DON; 4	(United States); HOM	(United States); GLN	(China); ZHU		7th	9
1999	Chrysler Viper GTS-R	Chrysler 8.0L V10	(Belgium) Marc Duez		(United Kingdom); SIL; 3										7th	9
1999	Chrysler Viper GTS-R	Chrysler 8.0L V10	(Belgium) Anthony Kumpen				(Hungary); HUN; 13								7th	9
1999	Chrysler Viper GTS-R	Chrysler 8.0L V10	(Belgium) Jean-François Hemroulle				(Hungary); HUN; 13								7th	9
2001	Chrysler Viper GTS-R	Chrysler 8.0L V10	(Belgium) Wim Daems	(Italy); MNZ; DNS	(Czech Republic); BRN; 8	(France); MAG; 13	(United Kingdom); SIL; DNF	(Belgium); ZOL; DNF	(Hungary); HUN; DNF	(Belgium); SPA; 9	(Austria); A1R	(Germany); NÜR; 11	(Spain); JAR; 9	(Portugal); EST; DNF	9th	2
2001	Chrysler Viper GTS-R	Chrysler 8.0L V10	(Hungary) Tamás Illés	(Italy); MNZ; DNS	(Czech Republic); BRN; 8	(France); MAG; 13	(United Kingdom); SIL; DNF	(Belgium); ZOL; DNF	(Hungary); HUN; DNF						9th	2
2001	Chrysler Viper GTS-R	Chrysler 8.0L V10	(Belgium) Bert Longin							(Belgium); SPA; 9				(Portugal); EST; DNF	9th	2
2001	Chrysler Viper GTS-R	Chrysler 8.0L V10	(Germany) Georg Severich							(Belgium); SPA; 9		(Germany); NÜR; 11			9th	2
2001	Chrysler Viper GTS-R	Chrysler 8.0L V10	(Belgium) Eric Geboers										(Spain); JAR; 9		9th	2
2005	Chevrolet Corvette C5-R	Chevrolet LS7r 7.0L V8	(Belgium) Bert Longin	(Italy); MNZ; 14	(France); MAG; 4	(United Kingdom); SIL; DNF	(Italy); IMO; 1	(Czech Republic); BRN; 4	(Belgium); SPA; DSQ	(Germany); OSC; 3	(Turkey); IST; 5	(China); ZHU; 1	(United Arab Emirates); DUB; 3	(Bahrain); BHR; 3	4th	52
2005	Chevrolet Corvette C5-R	Chevrolet LS7r 7.0L V8	(Belgium) Anthony Kumpen	(Italy); MNZ; 14	(France); MAG; 4	(United Kingdom); SIL; DNF	(Italy); IMO; 1	(Czech Republic); BRN; 4	(Belgium); SPA; DSQ	(Germany); OSC; 3	(Turkey); IST; 5	(China); ZHU; 1	(United Arab Emirates); DUB; 3	(Bahrain); BHR; 3	4th	52
2005	Chevrolet Corvette C5-R	Chevrolet LS7r 7.0L V8	(Netherlands) Mike Hezemans	(Italy); MNZ; 14	(France); MAG; 4	(United Kingdom); SIL; DNF	(Italy); IMO; 1	(Czech Republic); BRN; 4	(Belgium); SPA; DSQ	(Germany); OSC; 3	(Turkey); IST; 5	(China); ZHU; 1	(United Arab Emirates); DUB; 3	(Bahrain); BHR; 3	4th	52
2005	Chevrolet Corvette C5-R	Chevrolet LS7r 7.0L V8	(Netherlands) Jeroen Bleekemolen						(Belgium); SPA; DSQ						4th	52
2006	Chevrolet Corvette C6.R	Chevrolet 7.0L V8	(Belgium) Bert Longin	(United Kingdom); SIL; 8	(Czech Republic); BRN; 14	(Germany); OSC; DNF	(Belgium); SPA; 3	(France); PRI; 1	(France); DIJ; DNF	(Italy); MUG; 7	(Hungary); HUN; 2	(Italy); ADR; 3	(United Arab Emirates); DUB; 2		5th	48
2006	Chevrolet Corvette C6.R	Chevrolet 7.0L V8	(Belgium) Anthony Kumpen	(United Kingdom); SIL; 8	(Czech Republic); BRN; 14	(Germany); OSC; DNF	(Belgium); SPA; 3	(France); PRI; 1	(France); DIJ; DNF	(Italy); MUG; 7	(Hungary); HUN; 2	(Italy); ADR; 3	(United Arab Emirates); DUB; 2		5th	48
2006	Chevrolet Corvette C6.R	Chevrolet 7.0L V8	(Netherlands) Mike Hezemans	(United Kingdom); SIL; 8	(Czech Republic); BRN; 14	(Germany); OSC; DNF	(Belgium); SPA; 3	(France); PRI; 1	(France); DIJ; DNF	(Italy); MUG; 7	(Hungary); HUN; 2	(Italy); ADR; 3	(United Arab Emirates); DUB; 2		5th	48
2006	Chevrolet Corvette C6.R	Chevrolet 7.0L V8	(Belgium) Kurt Mollekens				(Belgium); SPA; 3								5th	48
2007	Chevrolet Corvette C5-R	Chevrolet 7.0L V8	(Belgium) Bert Longin	(China); ZHU; 3	(United Kingdom); SIL; 3	(Romania); BUC; 5	(Italy); MNZ; 5	(Germany); OSC; DSQ	(Belgium); SPA; 3	(Italy); ADR; 10	(Czech Republic); BRN; 3	(France); NOG; 8	(Belgium); ZOL; 2		5th	43.5
2007	Chevrolet Corvette C5-R	Chevrolet 7.0L V8	(Belgium) Anthony Kumpen	(China); ZHU; 3	(United Kingdom); SIL; 3	(Romania); BUC; 5	(Italy); MNZ; 5	(Germany); OSC; DSQ	(Belgium); SPA; 3	(Italy); ADR; 10	(Czech Republic); BRN; 3	(France); NOG; 8	(Belgium); ZOL; 2		5th	43.5
2007	Chevrolet Corvette C5-R	Chevrolet 7.0L V8	(Belgium) Kurt Mollekens						(Belgium); SPA; 3						5th	43.5
2007	Chevrolet Corvette C5-R	Chevrolet 7.0L V8	(Belgium) Frédéric Bouvy						(Belgium); SPA; 3						5th	43.5
2008	Saleen S7-R	Ford 7.0 L V8	(Belgium) Bert Longin	(United Kingdom); SIL; 16	(Italy); MNZ; 6	(Italy); ADR; DNF	(Germany); OSC; 10	(Belgium); SPA; DNF	(Romania); BUC; 6	(Romania); BUC; 4	(Czech Republic); BRN; DNF	(France); NOG; DNF	(Belgium); ZOL; DNF	(Argentina); SAN; 1	6th	18.5
2008	Saleen S7-R	Ford 7.0 L V8	(Belgium) Anthony Kumpen	(United Kingdom); SIL; 16	(Italy); MNZ; 6	(Italy); ADR; DNF	(Germany); OSC; 10	(Belgium); SPA; DNF	(Romania); BUC; 6	(Romania); BUC; 4	(Czech Republic); BRN; DNF	(France); NOG; DNF	(Belgium); ZOL; DNF	(Argentina); SAN; 1	6th	18.5
2008	Saleen S7-R	Ford 7.0 L V8	(Belgium) Kurt Mollekens					(Belgium); SPA; DNF							6th	18.5
2008	Saleen S7-R	Ford 7.0 L V8	(Belgium) Frédéric Bouvy					(Belgium); SPA; DNF							6th	18.5
2009	Chevrolet Corvette C6.R	Chevrolet 7.0L V8	(Belgium) Anthony Kumpen	(United Kingdom); SIL; 4	(Italy); ADR; 2	(Germany); OSC; 1	(Belgium); SPA; 1	(Hungary); BUD; 5	(Portugal); ALG; 2	(France); PRI; DNF	(Belgium); ZOL; DSQ				2nd	45
2009	Chevrolet Corvette C6.R	Chevrolet 7.0L V8	(Netherlands) Mike Hezemans	(United Kingdom); SIL; 4	(Italy); ADR; 2	(Germany); OSC; 1	(Belgium); SPA; 1	(Hungary); BUD; 5	(Portugal); ALG; 2	(France); PRI; DNF	(Belgium); ZOL; DSQ				2nd	45
2009	Chevrolet Corvette C6.R	Chevrolet 7.0L V8	(Belgium) Kurt Mollekens				(Belgium); SPA; 1								2nd	45
2009	Chevrolet Corvette C6.R	Chevrolet 7.0L V8	(Netherlands) Jos Menten				(Belgium); SPA; 1								2nd	45

=== Complete NASCAR Whelen Euro Series - Elite 1 results ===
(key) (Bold – Pole position awarded by qualifying time. Italics – Pole position earned by points standings or practice time. * – Most laps led.)

NASCAR Whelen Euro Series - Elite 1
Year	Car	No.	Drivers	1	2	3	4	5	6	7	8	9	10	11	12	Pos.	Pts
2014	Chevrolet SS	24	(Belgium) Anthony Kumpen	(Spain); VAL; 3	(Spain); VAL; 4	(United Kingdom); BRH; 4	(United Kingdom); BRH; 2	(France); TOU; 7	(France); TOU; 8	(Germany); NUR; 5	(Germany); NUR; 2	(Italy); UMB; 2	(Italy); UMB; 5	(France); LEM; 1	(France); LEM; 2	1st	656
2014	Chevrolet SS	11	(Belgium) Bert Longin	(Spain); VAL; 2	(Spain); VAL; 3	(United Kingdom); BRH; 18	(United Kingdom); BRH; 21	(France); TOU; 6	(France); TOU; 9	(Germany); NUR; 12	(Germany); NUR; 8	(Italy); UMB; 8	(Italy); UMB; 7	(France); LEM; 5	(France); LEM; 7	6th	573
2015	Chevrolet SS	24	(Belgium) Anthony Kumpen	(Spain); VAL; 5	(Spain); VAL; 3	(Netherlands); VEN; 16	(Netherlands); VEN; 1	(United Kingdom); BRH; 5	(United Kingdom); BRH; 5	(France); TOU; 18	(France); TOU; 9	(Italy); UMB; 4	(Italy); UMB; 10	(Belgium); ZOL; 3	(Belgium); ZOL; 3	4th	610
2015	Chevrolet SS	11	(Belgium) Bert Longin	(Spain); VAL; 17	(Spain); VAL; 22	(Netherlands); VEN; 5	(Netherlands); VEN; 15	(United Kingdom); BRH; 8	(United Kingdom); BRH; 6	(France); TOU; 12	(France); TOU; 12	(Italy); UMB; 15	(Italy); UMB; 4	(Belgium); ZOL; 15	(Belgium); ZOL; 17	12th	509
2016	Chevrolet SS	24	(Belgium) Anthony Kumpen	(Spain); VAL; 1	(Spain); VAL; 4	(Netherlands); VEN; 2	(Netherlands); VEN; 1	(United Kingdom); BRH; 1	(United Kingdom); BRH; 10	(France); TOU; 4	(France); TOU; 5	(Italy); ADR; 1	(Italy); ADR; 2	(Belgium); ZOL; 1	(Belgium); ZOL; 7	1st	657
2016	Chevrolet SS	11	(Belgium) Bert Longin	(Spain); VAL; 7	(Spain); VAL; 9	(Netherlands); VEN; DNS	(Netherlands); VEN; 11	(United Kingdom); BRH; 10	(United Kingdom); BRH; 11	(France); TOU; 10	(France); TOU; 7	(Italy); ADR; 3	(Italy); ADR; 4	(Belgium); ZOL; 19	(Belgium); ZOL; 8	5th	535
2016	Chevrolet SS	46	(United States) Brandon Gdovic	(Spain); VAL; 20	(Spain); VAL; 25	(Netherlands); VEN	(Netherlands); VEN	(United Kingdom); BRH	(United Kingdom); BRH	(France); TOU	(France); TOU	(Italy); ADR	(Italy); ADR	(Belgium); ZOL	(Belgium); ZOL	36th	43

=== Complete NASCAR Whelen Euro Series - Elite 2 results ===
(key) (Bold – Pole position awarded by qualifying time. Italics – Pole position earned by points standings or practice time. * – Most laps led.)

NASCAR Whelen Euro Series - Elite 2
Year	Car	No.	Drivers	1	2	3	4	5	6	7	8	9	10	11	12	Pos.	Pts
2014	Chevrolet SS	24	(Belgium) Maxime Dumarey	(Spain); VAL; 6	(Spain); VAL; 4	(United Kingdom); BRH; 5	(United Kingdom); BRH; 3	(France); TOU; 3	(France); TOU; 6	(Germany); NUR; 3	(Germany); NUR; 3	(Italy); UMB; 1	(Italy); UMB; 14	(France); LEM; 3	(France); LEM; 5	1st	654
2014	Chevrolet SS	11	(Belgium) Neal van Vaerenbergh	(Spain); VAL; 1	(Spain); VAL; 1											37th	96
2014	Chevrolet SS	11	(Belgium) Jerry de Weerdt			(United Kingdom); BRH; 10	(United Kingdom); BRH; DNQ									24th	166
2014	Chevrolet SS	11	(Belgium) Stienes Longin					(France); TOU; 4	(France); TOU; 2	(Germany); NUR; 9	(Germany); NUR; 5	(Italy); UMB	(Italy); UMB			27th	156
2014	Chevrolet SS	11	(Switzerland) Gabriele Gardel											(France); LEM; 4	(France); LEM; 1	22nd	172
2015	Chevrolet SS	24	(Belgium) Martin van Hove	(Spain); VAL; 16	(Spain); VAL; 6											25th	144
2015	Chevrolet SS	24	(Belgium) Maxime Dumarey			(Netherlands); VEN; 9	(Netherlands); VEN; 8	(United Kingdom); BRH; 11	(United Kingdom); BRH; 6	(France); TOU; DNS	(France); TOU; DNS			(Belgium); ZOL; 5	(Belgium); ZOL; 19	20th	241
2015	Chevrolet SS	24	(Belgium) Bart van Haeren									(Italy); UMB; 5	(Italy); UMB; 13			26th	140
2015	Chevrolet SS	11	(Belgium) Stienes Longin	(Spain); VAL; 2	(Spain); VAL; 8	(Netherlands); VEN; 6	(Netherlands); VEN; 4	(United Kingdom); BRH; 20	(United Kingdom); BRH; 3	(France); TOU; 1	(France); TOU; 19	(Italy); UMB; 2	(Italy); UMB; 3	(Belgium); ZOL; 7	(Belgium); ZOL; 2	4th	621
2016	Chevrolet SS	24	(Switzerland) Gabriele Gardel	(Spain); VAL; 4	(Spain); VAL; 23	(Netherlands); VEN; 11	(Netherlands); VEN; 4	(United Kingdom); BRH; 23	(United Kingdom); BRH; 6	(France); TOU; 5	(France); TOU; 5	(Italy); ADR; 1	(Italy); ADR; 2	(Belgium); ZOL; 1	(Belgium); ZOL; 5	2nd	604
2016	Chevrolet SS	11	(Belgium) Stienes Longin	(Spain); VAL; 1	(Spain); VAL; 1	(Netherlands); VEN; 1	(Netherlands); VEN; 1	(United Kingdom); BRH; 1	(United Kingdom); BRH; 2	(France); TOU; 3	(France); TOU; 1	(Italy); ADR; 2	(Italy); ADR; 1	(Belgium); ZOL; 24	(Belgium); ZOL; 1	1st	650
2016	Chevrolet SS	46	(Slovakia) Christian Malchárek	(Spain); VAL; 21	(Spain); VAL; 11	(Netherlands); VEN	(Netherlands); VEN	(United Kingdom); BRH	(United Kingdom); BRH	(France); TOU	(France); TOU	(Italy); ADR	(Italy); ADR	(Belgium); ZOL	(Belgium); ZOL	27th	129

== Gallery ==
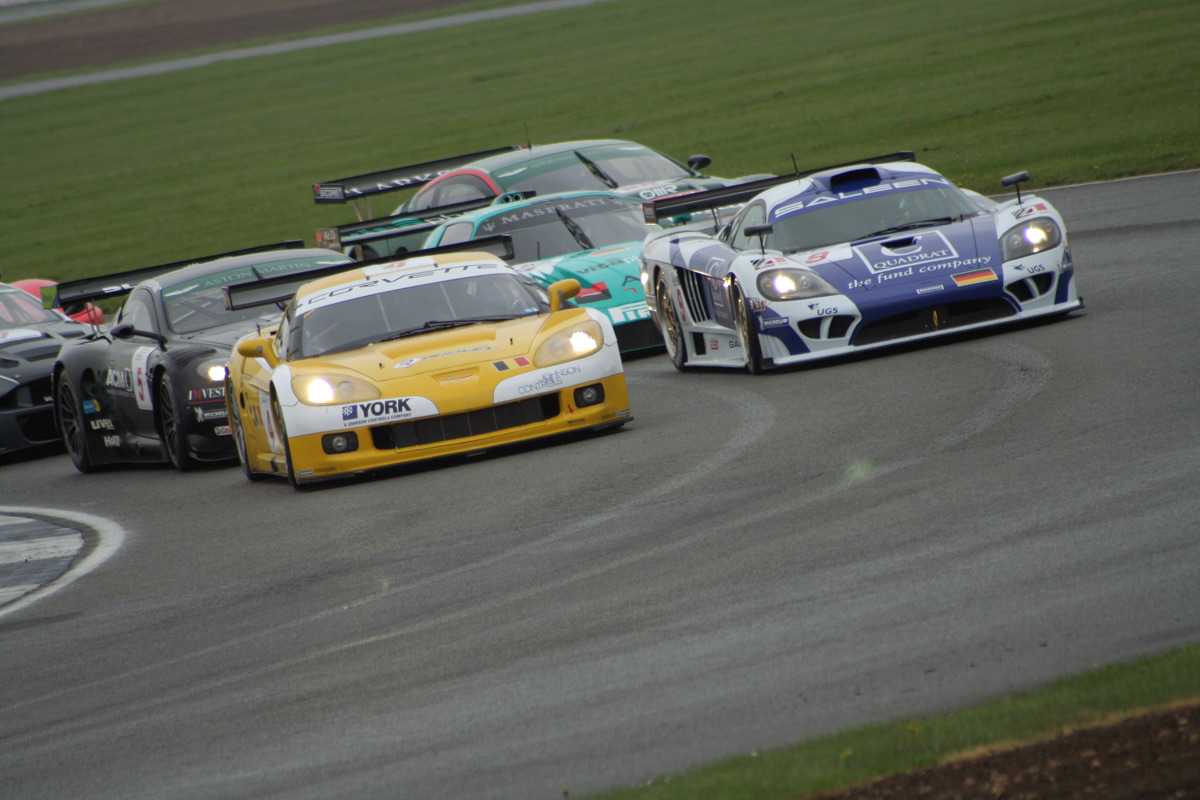
Start of the 2006 FIA GT Tourist Trophy

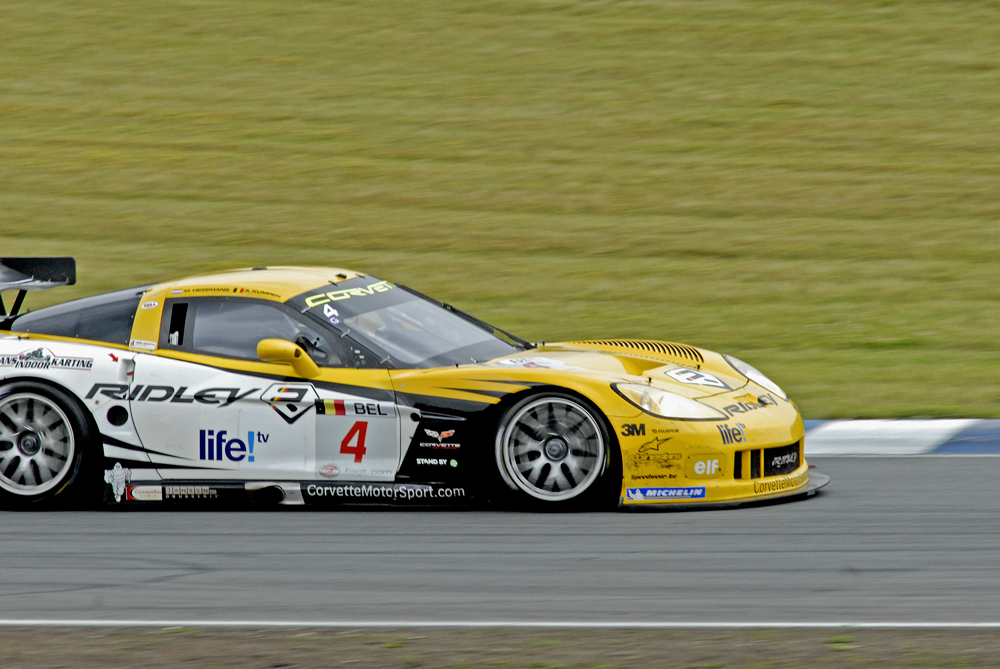
PK Carsport at Oschersleben 2009

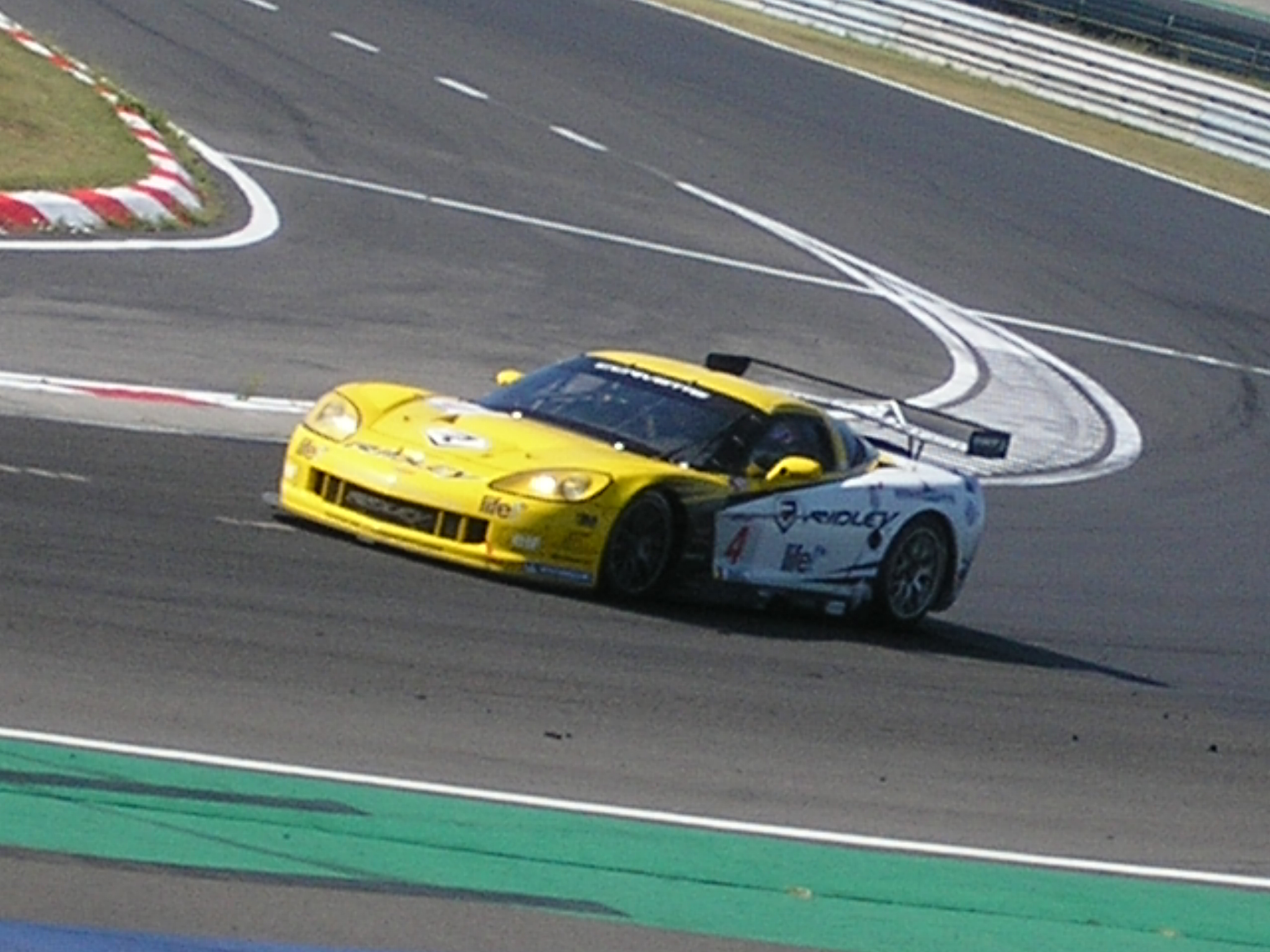
PK Carsport at Budapest 2009

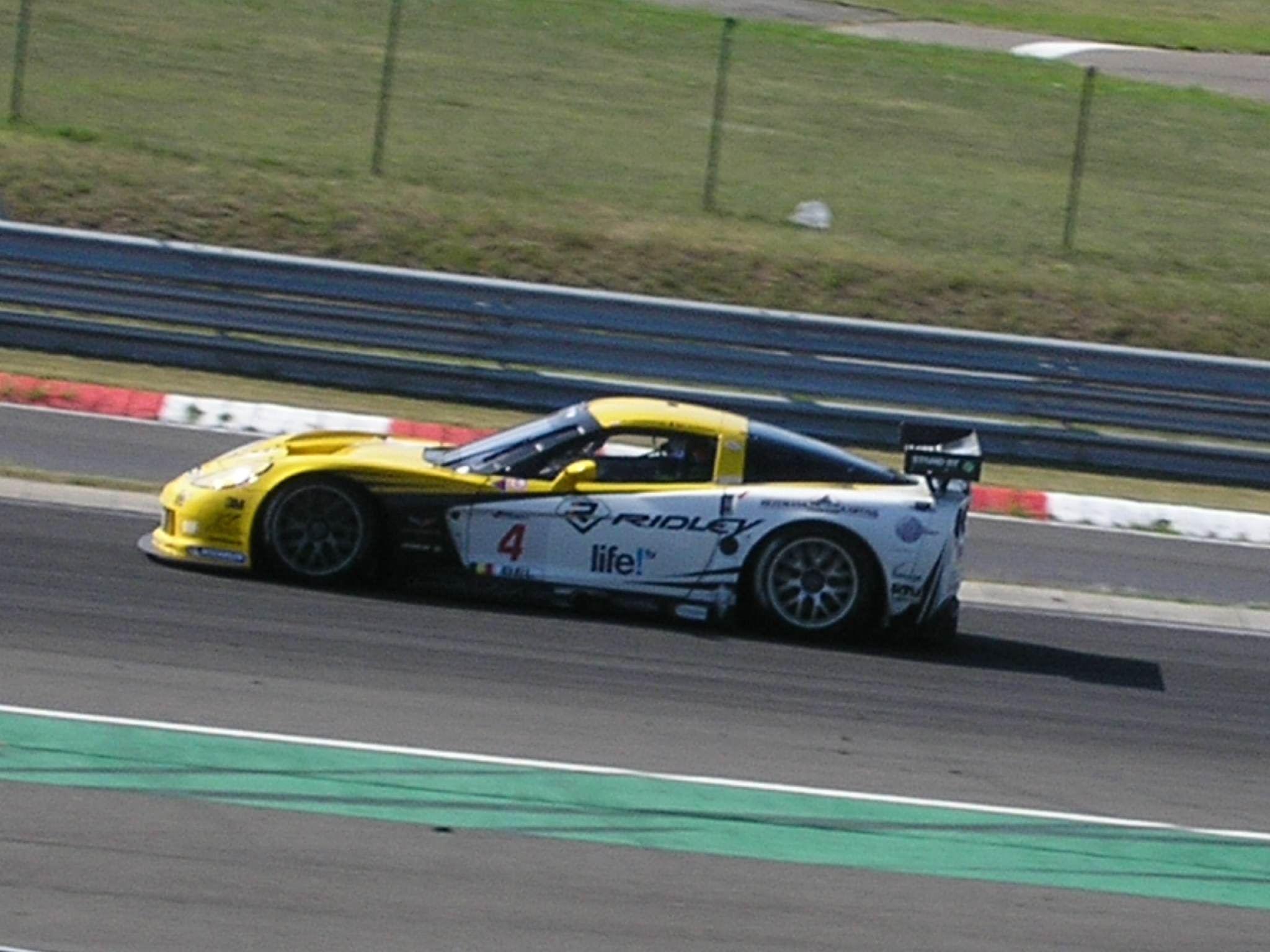
PK Carsport at Budapest 2009

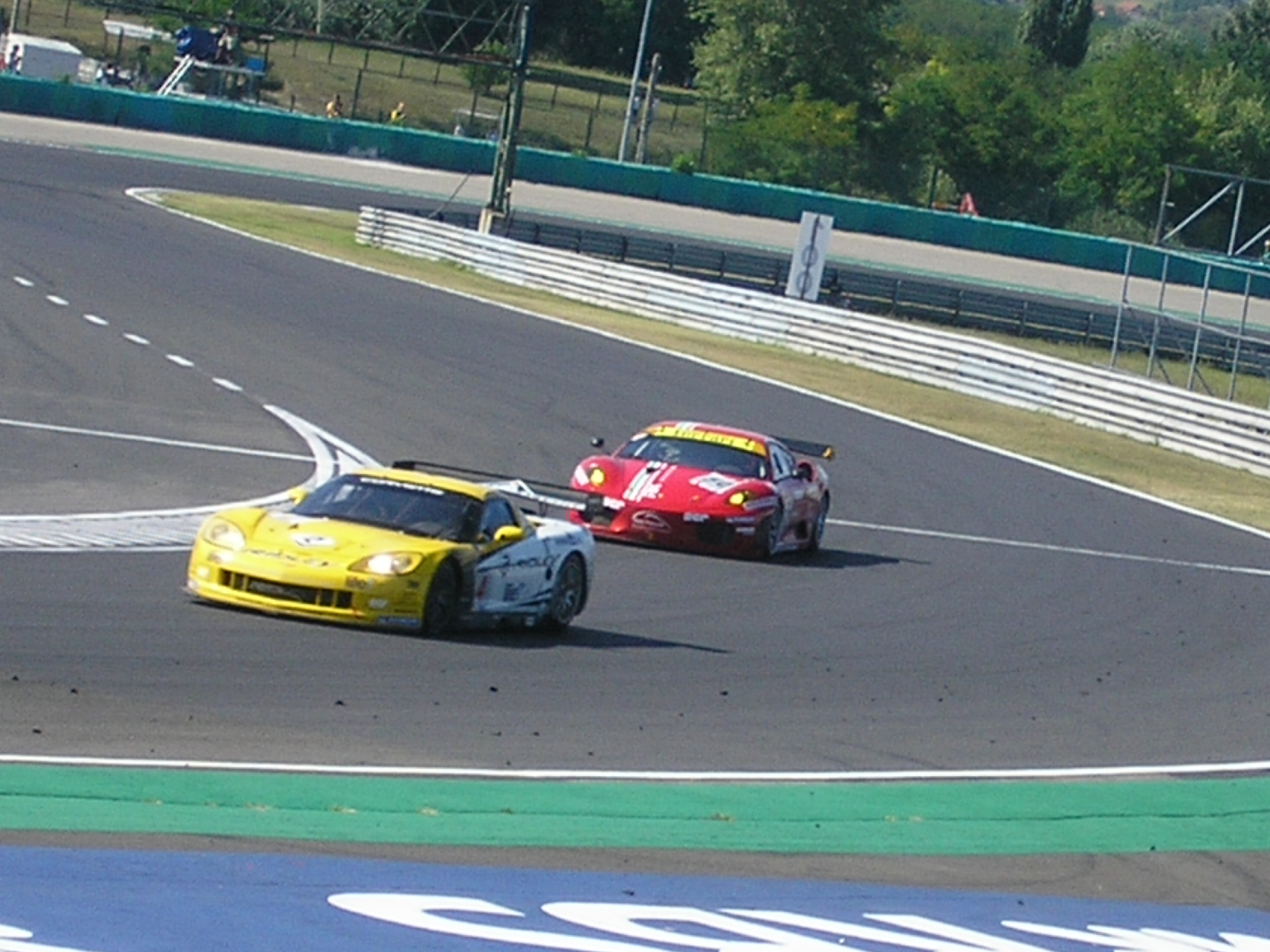
PK Carsport at Budapest 2009

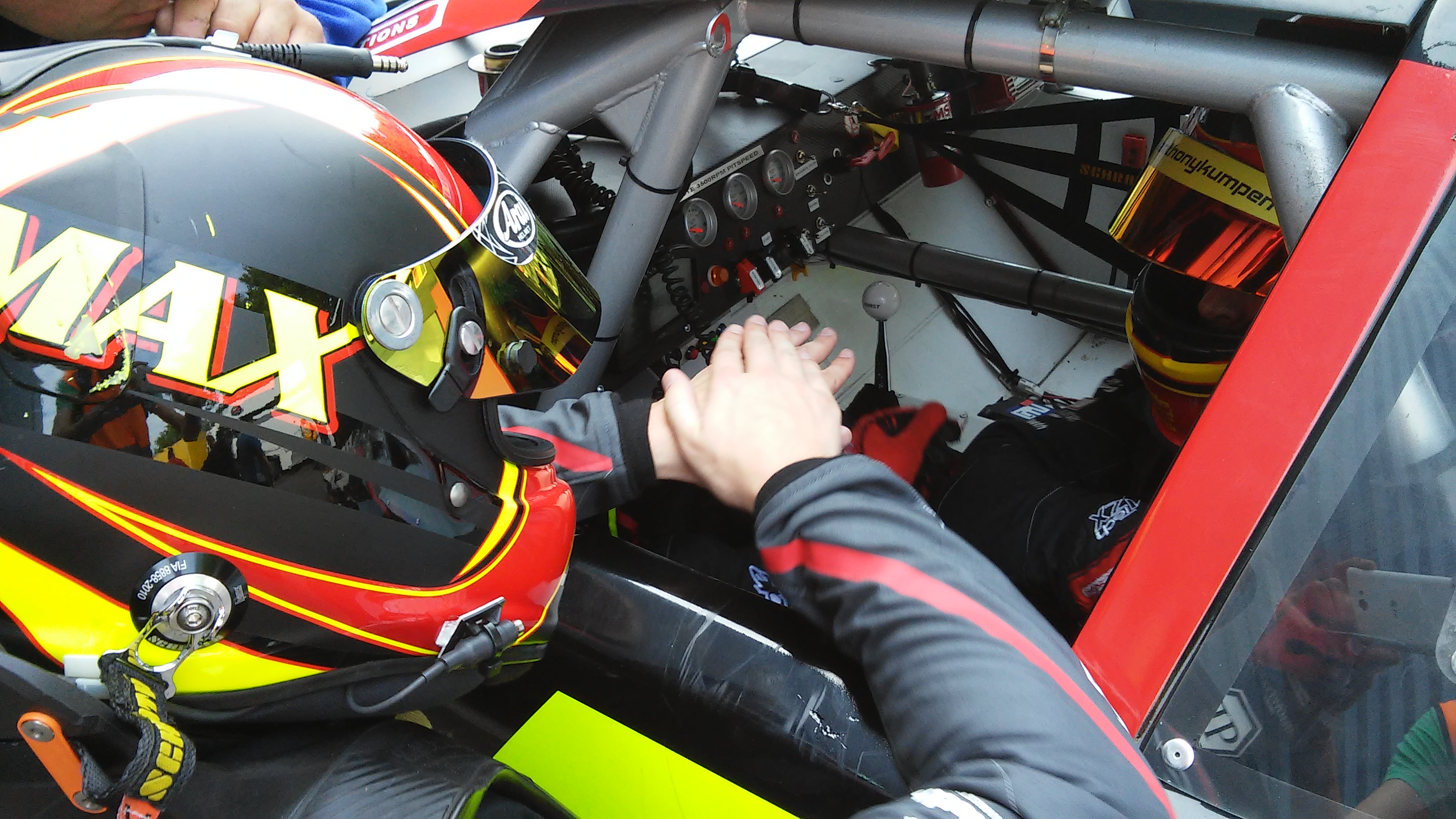
Anthony Kumpen and Maxime Dumarey at Raceway Venray 2015

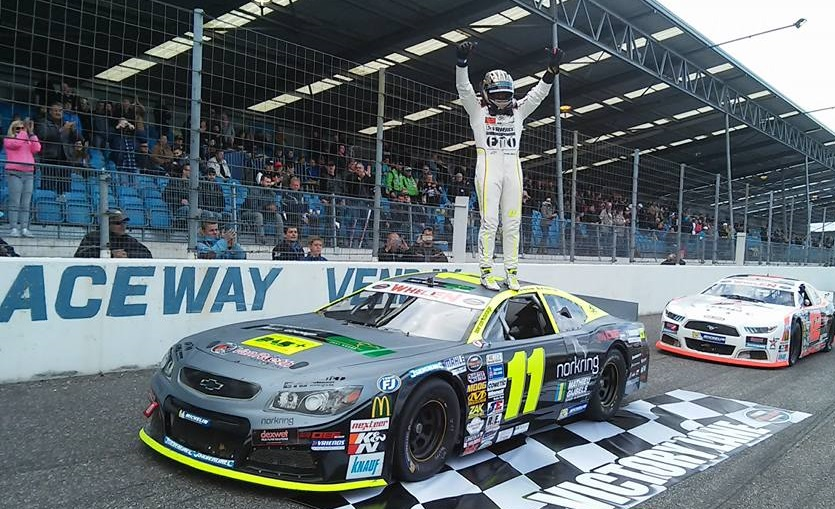
Stienes Longin winning at Raceway Venray 2016

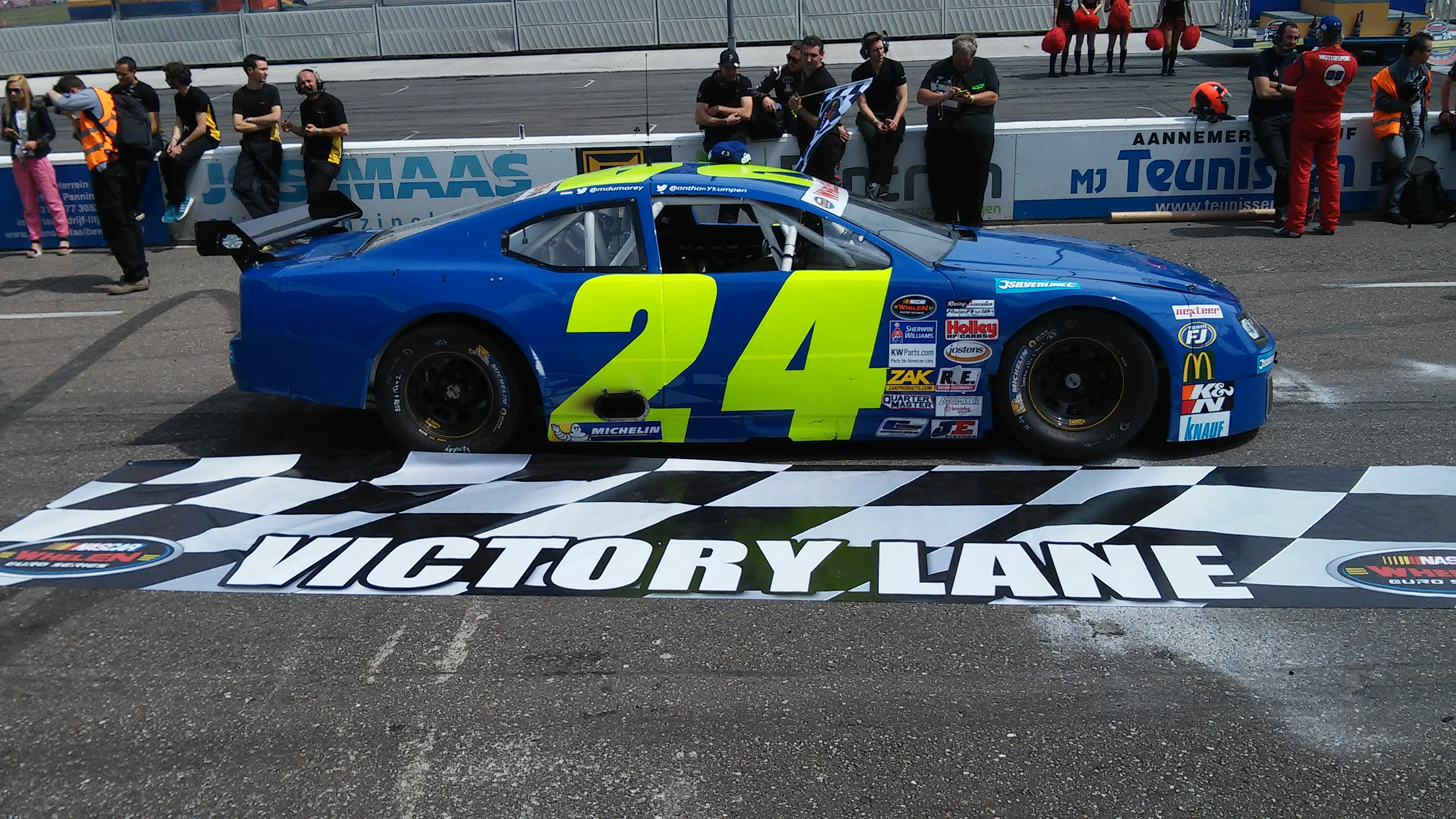
Anthony Kumpen winning at Raceway Venray 2015

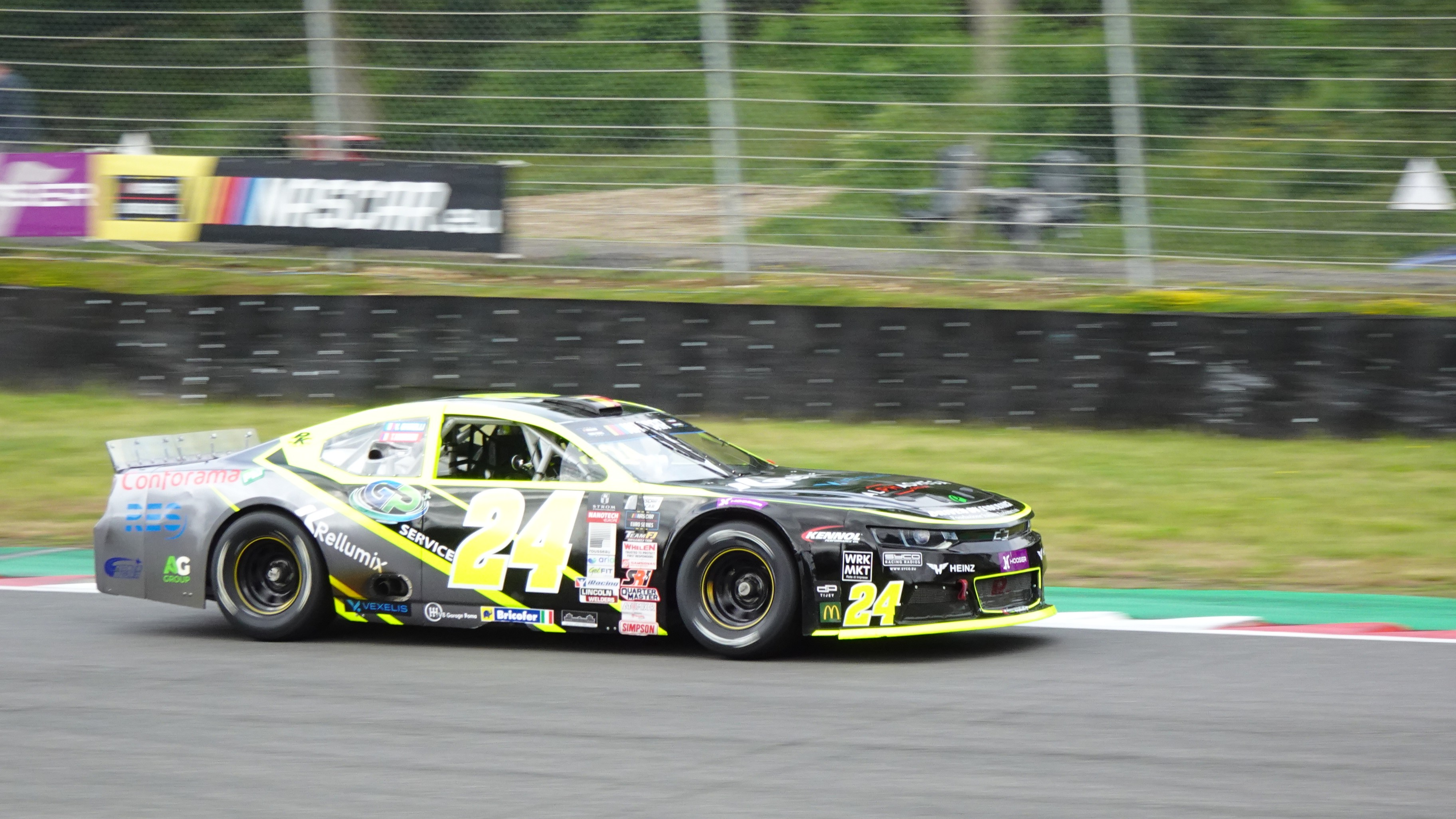
Ghirelli at Brands Hatch in 2026

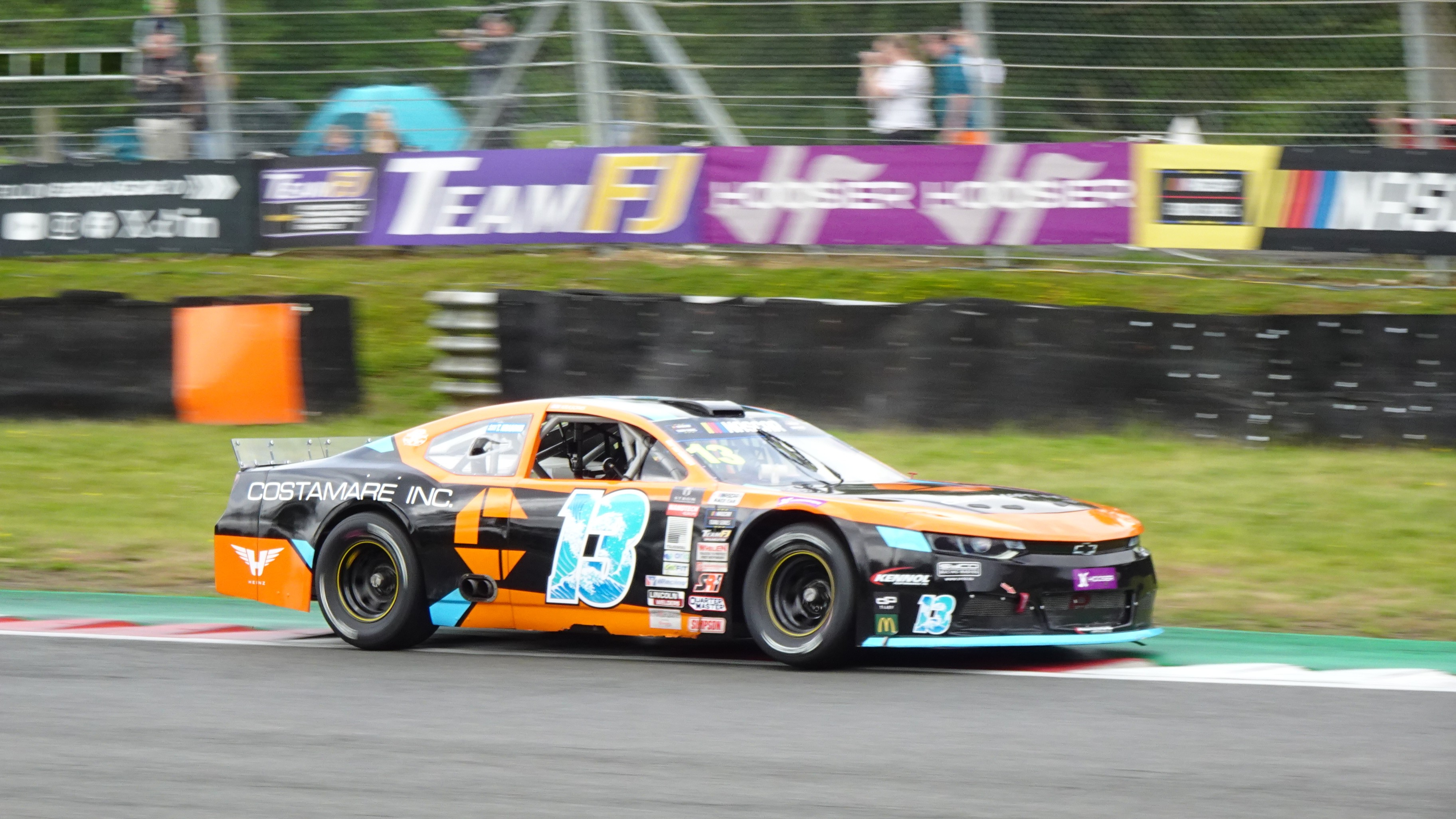
Krasonis in 2026
