= 2001 FIA GT Estoril 500km =

Layout of the Autódromo do Estoril

The 2001 FIA GT Estoril 500 km was the eleventh and final round the 2001 FIA GT Championship season. It took place at the Autódromo do Estoril, Portugal, on October 21, 2001.

== Official results ==
Class winners in bold. Cars failing to complete 70% of winner's distance marked as Not Classified (NC).

Pos	Class	No	Team	Drivers	Chassis	Tyre	Laps
Pos	Class	No	Team	Drivers	Engine	Tyre	Laps
1	**GT**	**3**	**(Netherlands) Team Carsport Holland**	**(Netherlands) Jeroen Bleekemolen (Netherlands) Mike Hezemans**	**Chrysler Viper GTS-R**	**MI**	**90**
1	**GT**	**3**	**(Netherlands) Team Carsport Holland**	**(Netherlands) Jeroen Bleekemolen (Netherlands) Mike Hezemans**	**Chrysler 8.0L V10**	**MI**	**90**
2	GT	1	(United Kingdom) Lister Storm Racing	(United Kingdom) Jamie Campbell-Walter (United Kingdom) Bobby Verdon-Roe	Lister Storm	**MI**	90
2	GT	1	(United Kingdom) Lister Storm Racing	(United Kingdom) Jamie Campbell-Walter (United Kingdom) Bobby Verdon-Roe	Jaguar 7.0L V12	**MI**	90
3	GT	7	(France) Larbre Compétition Chéreau	(France) Christophe Bouchut (France) Jean-Philippe Belloc (Portugal) Tiago Monteiro	Chrysler Viper GTS-R	**MI**	90
3	GT	7	(France) Larbre Compétition Chéreau	(France) Christophe Bouchut (France) Jean-Philippe Belloc (Portugal) Tiago Monteiro	Chrysler 8.0L V10	**MI**	90
4	GT	4	(Netherlands) Team Carsport Holland	(Netherlands) Michael Bleekemolen (Netherlands) Sebastiaan Bleekemolen	Chrysler Viper GTS-R	**MI**	89
4	GT	4	(Netherlands) Team Carsport Holland	(Netherlands) Michael Bleekemolen (Netherlands) Sebastiaan Bleekemolen	Chrysler 8.0L V10	**MI**	89
5	GT	19	(Germany) Reiter Engineering	(United Kingdom) Oliver Gavin (Netherlands) Peter Kox	Lamborghini Diablo GT	**D**	89
5	GT	19	(Germany) Reiter Engineering	(United Kingdom) Oliver Gavin (Netherlands) Peter Kox	Lamborghini 6.0L V12	**D**	89
6	**N-GT**	**55**	**(France) Perspective Racing**	**(France) Thierry Perrier (Belgium) Michel Neugarten**	**Porsche 911 GT3-RS**	**D**	**88**
6	**N-GT**	**55**	**(France) Perspective Racing**	**(France) Thierry Perrier (Belgium) Michel Neugarten**	**Porsche 3.6L Flat-6**	**D**	**88**
7	GT	10	(France) Paul Belmondo Competition	(France) Luis Marques (France) Claude-Yves Gosselin	Chrysler Viper GTS-R	**D**	88
7	GT	10	(France) Paul Belmondo Competition	(France) Luis Marques (France) Claude-Yves Gosselin	Chrysler 8.0L V10	**D**	88
8	N-GT	50	(France) Larbre Compétition Chéreau	(France) Sébastien Dumez (France) Patrice Goueslard	Porsche 911 GT3-RS	**MI**	88
8	N-GT	50	(France) Larbre Compétition Chéreau	(France) Sébastien Dumez (France) Patrice Goueslard	Porsche 3.6L Flat-6	**MI**	88
9	N-GT	62	(France) JMB Competition	(Italy) Christian Pescatori (France) David Terrien	Ferrari 360 Modena N-GT	**MI**	87
9	N-GT	62	(France) JMB Competition	(Italy) Christian Pescatori (France) David Terrien	Ferrari 3.6L V8	**MI**	87
10	GT	2	(United Kingdom) Lister Storm Racing	(United Kingdom) Julian Bailey (Germany) Nicolaus Springer	Lister Storm	**MI**	87
10	GT	2	(United Kingdom) Lister Storm Racing	(United Kingdom) Julian Bailey (Germany) Nicolaus Springer	Jaguar 7.0L V12	**MI**	87
11	N-GT	76	(Germany) RWS Motorsport	(Spain) Antonio García (Austria) Dieter Quester	Porsche 911 GT3-R	**MI**	87
11	N-GT	76	(Germany) RWS Motorsport	(Spain) Antonio García (Austria) Dieter Quester	Porsche 3.6L Flat-6	**MI**	87
12	N-GT	54	(Italy) ART Engineering	(Italy) Fabio Babini (United Kingdom) Nigel Smith	Porsche 911 GT3-RS	**P**	86
12	N-GT	54	(Italy) ART Engineering	(Italy) Fabio Babini (United Kingdom) Nigel Smith	Porsche 3.6L Flat-6	**P**	86
13	N-GT	70	(Germany) Klober JVG Racing	(Germany) Jürgen von Gartzen (Switzerland) Bruno Eichmann	Porsche 911 GT3-RS	**P**	86
13	N-GT	70	(Germany) Klober JVG Racing	(Germany) Jürgen von Gartzen (Switzerland) Bruno Eichmann	Porsche 3.6L Flat-6	**P**	86
14	N-GT	99	(Netherlands) Peter Kutemann (France) JMB Competition	(Netherlands) Peter Kutemann (Switzerland) Iradj Alexander	Ferrari 360 Modena N-GT	**MI**	86
14	N-GT	99	(Netherlands) Peter Kutemann (France) JMB Competition	(Netherlands) Peter Kutemann (Switzerland) Iradj Alexander	Ferrari 3.6L V8	**MI**	86
15	N-GT	63	(France) JMB Competition	(Italy) Batti Pregliasco (Italy) Marco Lambertini	Ferrari 360 Modena N-GT	**MI**	84
15	N-GT	63	(France) JMB Competition	(Italy) Batti Pregliasco (Italy) Marco Lambertini	Ferrari 3.6L V8	**MI**	84
16	N-GT	72	(Spain) Escuderia Bengala (Spain) Paco Orti Racing	(Spain) Paco Orti (Germany) Wolfgang Kaufmann	Porsche 911 GT3-R	**D**	82
16	N-GT	72	(Spain) Escuderia Bengala (Spain) Paco Orti Racing	(Spain) Paco Orti (Germany) Wolfgang Kaufmann	Porsche 3.6L Flat-6	**D**	82
17	GT	30	(Germany) Proton Competition	(Austria) Horst Felbermayr, Sr. (Austria) Horst Felbermayr, Jr.	Porsche 911 GT2	**Y**	82
17	GT	30	(Germany) Proton Competition	(Austria) Horst Felbermayr, Sr. (Austria) Horst Felbermayr, Jr.	Porsche 3.8L Turbo Flat-6	**Y**	82
18	N-GT	59	(Germany) Freisinger Racing	(Russia) Alexey Vasilyev (Russia) Nikolai Fomenko	Porsche 911 GT3-R	**Y**	82
18	N-GT	59	(Germany) Freisinger Racing	(Russia) Alexey Vasilyev (Russia) Nikolai Fomenko	Porsche 3.6L Flat-6	**Y**	82
19	N-GT	53	(Italy) ART Engineering	(United Kingdom) Paul Knapfield (Italy) Andrea Bertolini	Porsche 911 GT3-R	**P**	80
19	N-GT	53	(Italy) ART Engineering	(United Kingdom) Paul Knapfield (Italy) Andrea Bertolini	Porsche 3.6L Flat-6	**P**	80
20	GT	8	(Germany) Proton Competition	(Germany) Christian Ried (Germany) Gerold Ried	Porsche 911 GT2	**Y**	80
20	GT	8	(Germany) Proton Competition	(Germany) Christian Ried (Germany) Gerold Ried	Porsche 3.8L Turbo Flat-6	**Y**	80
21	N-GT	67	(Italy) MAC Racing	(Italy) Thomas Pichler (Italy) Raffele Sangiuolo	Porsche 911 GT3-RS	**D**	80
21	N-GT	67	(Italy) MAC Racing	(Italy) Thomas Pichler (Italy) Raffele Sangiuolo	Porsche 3.6L Flat-6	**D**	80
22	GT	9	(France) Team A.R.T.	(France) Jean-Pierre Jarier (France) François Lafon	Chrysler Viper GTS-R	**D**	79
22	GT	9	(France) Team A.R.T.	(France) Jean-Pierre Jarier (France) François Lafon	Chrysler 8.0L V10	**D**	79
23	GT	15	(United Kingdom) Prodrive All-Stars	(Sweden) Rickard Rydell (Switzerland) Alain Menu	Ferrari 550-GTS Maranello	**D**	79
23	GT	15	(United Kingdom) Prodrive All-Stars	(Sweden) Rickard Rydell (Switzerland) Alain Menu	Ferrari 5.9L V12	**D**	79
24	N-GT	58	(Germany) Freisinger Motorsport	(France) Angelo Lembo (France) Marco Saviozzi (France) Emmanuel Moinel Delalande	Porsche 911 GT3-RS	**Y**	79
24	N-GT	58	(Germany) Freisinger Motorsport	(France) Angelo Lembo (France) Marco Saviozzi (France) Emmanuel Moinel Delalande	Porsche 3.6L Flat-6	**Y**	79
25	N-GT	57	(Germany) Freisinger Motorsport	(France) Romain Dumas (France) Stéphane Ortelli	Porsche 911 GT3-RS	**Y**	78
25	N-GT	57	(Germany) Freisinger Motorsport	(France) Romain Dumas (France) Stéphane Ortelli	Porsche 3.6L Flat-6	**Y**	78
26	N-GT	77	(Germany) RWS Motorsport	(Italy) Luca Riccitelli (Germany) Sascha Maassen	Porsche 911 GT3-RS	**MI**	78
26	N-GT	77	(Germany) RWS Motorsport	(Italy) Luca Riccitelli (Germany) Sascha Maassen	Porsche 3.6L Flat-6	**MI**	78
27	GT	14	(Italy) Autorlando Sport	(Italy) Gabriele Sabatini (Italy) Marco Spinelli	Porsche 911 GT2	**P**	76
27	GT	14	(Italy) Autorlando Sport	(Italy) Gabriele Sabatini (Italy) Marco Spinelli	Porsche 3.8L Turbo Flat-6	**P**	76
28	N-GT	71	(Germany) Freisinger Racing	(Portugal) Pedro Névoa (United Kingdom) Tim Lawrence	Porsche 911 GT3-RS	**Y**	74
28	N-GT	71	(Germany) Freisinger Racing	(Portugal) Pedro Névoa (United Kingdom) Tim Lawrence	Porsche 3.6L Flat-6	**Y**	74
29	GT	12	(France) Paul Belmondo Racing	(France) Boris Derichebourg (Belgium) Vincent Vosse	Chrysler Viper GTS-R	**D**	73
29	GT	12	(France) Paul Belmondo Racing	(France) Boris Derichebourg (Belgium) Vincent Vosse	Chrysler 8.0L V10	**D**	73
30 DNF	GT	21	(Belgium) GLPK Racing	(Belgium) Wim Daems (Belgium) Bert Longin	Chrysler Viper GTS-R	**D**	54
30 DNF	GT	21	(Belgium) GLPK Racing	(Belgium) Wim Daems (Belgium) Bert Longin	Chrysler 8.0L V10	**D**	54
31 DNF	N-GT	90	(France) Philippe Brocard (France) Team Kalliste	(France) Stéphane Echallard (France) Jean-Luc Blanchemain (France) Olivier Dupard	Porsche 911 GT3-RS	?	45
31 DNF	N-GT	90	(France) Philippe Brocard (France) Team Kalliste	(France) Stéphane Echallard (France) Jean-Luc Blanchemain (France) Olivier Dupard	Porsche 3.6L Flat-6	?	45
32 DNF	GT	24	(Italy) Racing Box	(Italy) Luca Cappellari (Italy) Emanuele Naspetti	Chrysler Viper GTS-R	**D**	37
32 DNF	GT	24	(Italy) Racing Box	(Italy) Luca Cappellari (Italy) Emanuele Naspetti	Chrysler 8.0L V10	**D**	37
33 DNF	N-GT	52	(United Kingdom) EMKA Racing	(United Kingdom) Tim Sugden (United Kingdom) Steve O'Rourke	Porsche 911 GT3-R	**D**	12
33 DNF	N-GT	52	(United Kingdom) EMKA Racing	(United Kingdom) Tim Sugden (United Kingdom) Steve O'Rourke	Porsche 3.6L Flat-6	**D**	12
34 DNF	GT	17	(France) Larbre Compétition Chéreau	(France) Sébastien Bourdais (France) Jean-Luc Chéreau (Belgium) Marc Duez	Chrysler Viper GTS-R	**MI**	1
34 DNF	GT	17	(France) Larbre Compétition Chéreau	(France) Sébastien Bourdais (France) Jean-Luc Chéreau (Belgium) Marc Duez	Chrysler 8.0L V10	**MI**	1
35 DNF	GT	11	(France) Paul Belmondo Racing	(Belgium) Anthony Kumpen (France) Paul Belmondo	Chrysler Viper GTS-R	**D**	0
35 DNF	GT	11	(France) Paul Belmondo Racing	(Belgium) Anthony Kumpen (France) Paul Belmondo	Chrysler 8.0L V10	**D**	0
36 DNF	N-GT	69	(Italy) Autorlando Sport	(Austria) Philipp Peter (Switzerland) Joël Camathias	Porsche 911 GT3-RS	**P**	0
36 DNF	N-GT	69	(Italy) Autorlando Sport	(Austria) Philipp Peter (Switzerland) Joël Camathias	Porsche 3.6L Flat-6	**P**	0

== Statistics ==
- Pole position – #77 RWS Motorsport^{†} – 1:45.694
- Fastest lap – #1 Lister Storm Racing – 1:40.186
- Average speed – 124.620 km/h

† – The Superpole shoot-out started under dry conditions, with the RWS Motorsport Porsche able to set a time before rain began to fall. This allowed an N-GT class car to take pole position while the other competitors were slowed.

FIA GT Championship
Previous race: 2001 FIA GT Jarama 500km	2001 season	Next race: None
