= 2001 Spa 24 Hours =

2001 Proximus Spa 24 Hours

Seasons
- ← 2000 2002 →

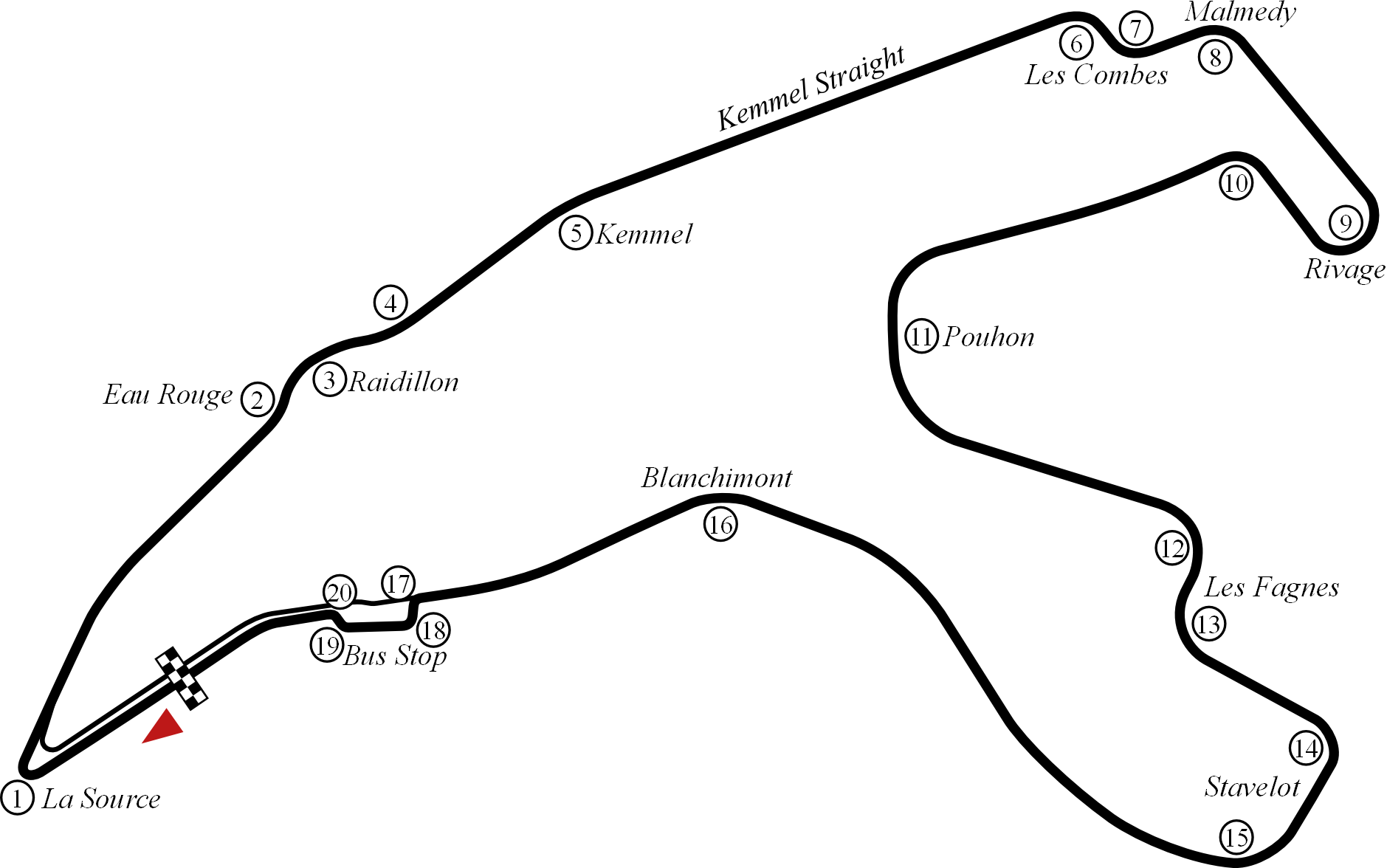
Layout of the Circuit de Spa-Francorchamps (1995-2003)

The 2001 Proximus 24 Spa World Championship GT was the 55th running of the Spa 24 Hours. It was also the seventh round the 2001 FIA GT Championship season, marking the first time that the FIA GT Championship had the Spa 24 Hours on their schedule. The addition of the FIA GT Championship turned the Spa 24 Hours from a touring car event into a sports car race.

This event combined the FIA GT's two classes (GT and N-GT) with cars from smaller national sports car series (designated Category 2) as well as cars from single-make series (designated Category 3). It took place at the Circuit de Spa-Francorchamps, Belgium, over August 4–5, 2001.

== Official results ==
Class winners in bold. Cars failing to complete 70% of winner's distance marked as Not Classified (NC).

| Pos | Class | No | Team | Drivers | Chassis | Tyre | Laps |
| Pos | Class | No | Team | Drivers | Engine | Tyre | Laps |
|---|---|---|---|---|---|---|---|
| 1 | **GT** | **7** | **(France) Larbre Compétition Chéreau** | **(France) Christophe Bouchut (France) Jean-Philippe Belloc (Belgium) Marc Duez** | **Chrysler Viper GTS-R** | **M** | **528** |
| 1 | **GT** | **7** | **(France) Larbre Compétition Chéreau** | **(France) Christophe Bouchut (France) Jean-Philippe Belloc (Belgium) Marc Duez** | **Chrysler 8.0L V10** | **M** | **528** |
| 2 | GT | 17 | (France) Larbre Compétition Chéreau | (France) Patrice Goueslard (France) Sébastien Dumez (France) Sébastien Bourdais | Chrysler Viper GTS-R | **M** | 523 |
| 2 | GT | 17 | (France) Larbre Compétition Chéreau | (France) Patrice Goueslard (France) Sébastien Dumez (France) Sébastien Bourdais | Chrysler 8.0L V10 | **M** | 523 |
| 3 | GT | 26 | (Belgium) Silver Racing | (Belgium) Robert Dierick (Belgium) Vincent Dupont (Belgium) Eric De Doncker | Chrysler Viper GTS-R | **D** | 521 |
| 3 | GT | 26 | (Belgium) Silver Racing | (Belgium) Robert Dierick (Belgium) Vincent Dupont (Belgium) Eric De Doncker | Chrysler 8.0L V10 | **D** | 521 |
| 4 | GT | 12 | (France) Paul Belmondo Racing | (France) Emmanuel Clérico (France) Éric Hélary (Belgium) Vincent Vosse | Chrysler Viper GTS-R | **D** | 516 |
| 4 | GT | 12 | (France) Paul Belmondo Racing | (France) Emmanuel Clérico (France) Éric Hélary (Belgium) Vincent Vosse | Chrysler 8.0L V10 | **D** | 516 |
| 5 | **N-GT** | **77** | **(Germany) RWS Motorsport** | **(Italy) Luca Riccitelli (Germany) Norman Simon (Austria) Dieter Quester (Spain) Antonio García** | **Porsche 911 GT3-RS** | **M** | **511** |
| 5 | **N-GT** | **77** | **(Germany) RWS Motorsport** | **(Italy) Luca Riccitelli (Germany) Norman Simon (Austria) Dieter Quester (Spain) Antonio García** | **Porsche 3.6L Flat-6** | **M** | **511** |
| 6 | N-GT | 57 | (Germany) Freisinger Motorsport | (France) Cyrille Sauvage (France) Stéphane Ortelli (Switzerland) Andrea Chiesa | Porsche 911 GT3-RS | **Y** | 508 |
| 6 | N-GT | 57 | (Germany) Freisinger Motorsport | (France) Cyrille Sauvage (France) Stéphane Ortelli (Switzerland) Andrea Chiesa | Porsche 3.6L Flat-6 | **Y** | 508 |
| 7 | N-GT | 55 | (France) Perspective Racing | (France) Thierry Perrier (Belgium) Michel Neugarten (Belgium) Kurt Thiers | Porsche 911 GT3-RS | **D** | 502 |
| 7 | N-GT | 55 | (France) Perspective Racing | (France) Thierry Perrier (Belgium) Michel Neugarten (Belgium) Kurt Thiers | Porsche 3.6L Flat-6 | **D** | 502 |
| 8 | GT | 10 | (France) Paul Belmondo Competition | (France) Claude-Yves Gosselin (France) Paul Belmondo (Belgium) Anthony Kumpen | Chrysler Viper GTS-R | **D** | 501 |
| 8 | GT | 10 | (France) Paul Belmondo Competition | (France) Claude-Yves Gosselin (France) Paul Belmondo (Belgium) Anthony Kumpen | Chrysler 8.0L V10 | **D** | 501 |
| 9 | GT | 21 | (Belgium) GLPK Racing | (Belgium) Wim Daems (Belgium) Bert Longin (Germany) Georg Severich | Chrysler Viper GTS-R | **D** | 499 |
| 9 | GT | 21 | (Belgium) GLPK Racing | (Belgium) Wim Daems (Belgium) Bert Longin (Germany) Georg Severich | Chrysler 8.0L V10 | **D** | 499 |
| 10 | **Cat.2** | **78** | **(Belgium) PSI Motorsport Team** | **(Belgium) Philippe Tollenaire (Belgium) Stéphane De Groodt (Finland) Markus Palttala** | **Porsche 911 GT3-R** | **D** | **499** |
| 10 | **Cat.2** | **78** | **(Belgium) PSI Motorsport Team** | **(Belgium) Philippe Tollenaire (Belgium) Stéphane De Groodt (Finland) Markus Palttala** | **Porsche 3.6L Flat-6** | **D** | **499** |
| 11 | N-GT | 59 | (Germany) Freisinger Racing | (France) Thierry Depoix (France) Philippe Haezebrouck (Switzerland) Toni Seiler | Porsche 911 GT3-RS | **Y** | 496 |
| 11 | N-GT | 59 | (Germany) Freisinger Racing | (France) Thierry Depoix (France) Philippe Haezebrouck (Switzerland) Toni Seiler | Porsche 3.6L Flat-6 | **Y** | 496 |
| 12 | N-GT | 54 | (Italy) ART Engineering | (Italy) Fabio Babini (Italy) Gianni Collini (Austria) Philipp Peter (Slovakia) Jirko Malchárek | Porsche 911 GT3-RS | **P** | 482 |
| 12 | N-GT | 54 | (Italy) ART Engineering | (Italy) Fabio Babini (Italy) Gianni Collini (Austria) Philipp Peter (Slovakia) Jirko Malchárek | Porsche 3.6L Flat-6 | **P** | 482 |
| 13 | N-GT | 82 | (Germany) DD Racing | (Germany) Volkmar Polaski (Germany) Andreas Kodsi (Germany) Martin Warth (United Kingdom) Marino Franchitti | Porsche 911 GT3-RS | **D** | 480 |
| 13 | N-GT | 82 | (Germany) DD Racing | (Germany) Volkmar Polaski (Germany) Andreas Kodsi (Germany) Martin Warth (United Kingdom) Marino Franchitti | Porsche 3.6L Flat-6 | **D** | 480 |
| 14 | **Cat.3** | **94** | **(Germany) Land Motorsport** | **(Germany) Peter Scharmach (Germany) Wolfgang Haugg (Belgium) Pierre-Yves Corthals (Belgium) David Sterckx** | **Porsche 911 Carrera RSR** | **D** | **477** |
| 14 | **Cat.3** | **94** | **(Germany) Land Motorsport** | **(Germany) Peter Scharmach (Germany) Wolfgang Haugg (Belgium) Pierre-Yves Corthals (Belgium) David Sterckx** | **Porsche 3.6L Flat-6** | **D** | **477** |
| 15 | N-GT | 66 | (China) Gammon Megaspeed | (Hong Kong) Alex Li (Belgium) Geoffroy Horion (United States) Gunnar Jeannette (Japan) Kenji Kawagoe | Porsche 911 GT3-R | **M** | 475 |
| 15 | N-GT | 66 | (China) Gammon Megaspeed | (Hong Kong) Alex Li (Belgium) Geoffroy Horion (United States) Gunnar Jeannette (Japan) Kenji Kawagoe | Porsche 3.6L Flat-6 | **M** | 475 |
| 16 | Cat.2 | 87 | (Belgium) Ice Pol Racing Team | (Belgium) Marc Delobe (Belgium) Michel Dequesnoy (Belgium) François-Xavier Boucher (Belgium) Philippe Conrelis | Porsche 911 GT2 | **D** | 475 |
| 16 | Cat.2 | 87 | (Belgium) Ice Pol Racing Team | (Belgium) Marc Delobe (Belgium) Michel Dequesnoy (Belgium) François-Xavier Boucher (Belgium) Philippe Conrelis | Porsche 3.6L Turbo Flat-6 | **D** | 475 |
| 17 | Cat.3 | 95 | (Switzerland) Alexander Frei | (Switzerland) Alexander Frei (France) David Velay (Belgium) Cédric Lorent (Belgium) Luc Dewinter | Lamborghini Diablo GTR | **P** | 474 |
| 17 | Cat.3 | 95 | (Switzerland) Alexander Frei | (Switzerland) Alexander Frei (France) David Velay (Belgium) Cédric Lorent (Belgium) Luc Dewinter | Lamborghini 6.0L V12 | **P** | 474 |
| 18 | Cat.2 | 84 | (Belgium) Ecurie Bruxelloise | (Belgium) Kurt Dujardyn (Belgium) Arnold Herreman (Belgium) Jean-Paul Herreman | Porsche 911 Carrera RSR | ? | 467 |
| 18 | Cat.2 | 84 | (Belgium) Ecurie Bruxelloise | (Belgium) Kurt Dujardyn (Belgium) Arnold Herreman (Belgium) Jean-Paul Herreman | Porsche 3.8L Flat-6 | ? | 467 |
| 19 | Cat.2 | 80 | (Belgium) Renstal Trommelke (Belgium) AD Sport | (Belgium) Koen Wauters (Belgium) Patrick Schreuers (Belgium) Albert Vanierschot (Belgium) Freddy Van Roey | Porsche 911 GT3-R | **P** | 458 |
| 19 | Cat.2 | 80 | (Belgium) Renstal Trommelke (Belgium) AD Sport | (Belgium) Koen Wauters (Belgium) Patrick Schreuers (Belgium) Albert Vanierschot (Belgium) Freddy Van Roey | Porsche 3.6L Flat-6 | **P** | 458 |
| 20 | Cat.3 | 96 | (Belgium) Ecurie Toison d'Or | (Belgium) Pascal Witmeur (Belgium) Jean-Paul Libert (Belgium) Stanislas De Sadeleer (Belgium) Arnaud Van Schevensteen | Lamborghini Diablo GTR | **P** | 418 |
| 20 | Cat.3 | 96 | (Belgium) Ecurie Toison d'Or | (Belgium) Pascal Witmeur (Belgium) Jean-Paul Libert (Belgium) Stanislas De Sadeleer (Belgium) Arnaud Van Schevensteen | Lamborghini 6.0L V12 | **P** | 418 |
| 21 | Cat.3 | 92 | (France) "Segolen" | (France) "Segolen" (France) Claude Olivier (France) Fabrice Letellier (France) Frederic Schmit | Porsche 911 Supercup | ? | 405 |
| 21 | Cat.3 | 92 | (France) "Segolen" | (France) "Segolen" (France) Claude Olivier (France) Fabrice Letellier (France) Frederic Schmit | Porsche 3.6L Flat-6 | ? | 405 |
| 22 | Cat.3 | 98 | (Belgium) Renstal Excelsior | (Belgium) Dirk De Sterck (Belgium) René Marin (Belgium) Luc Meeuson (Belgium) Jacky Delvaux | Lotus Elise | **D** | 401 |
| 22 | Cat.3 | 98 | (Belgium) Renstal Excelsior | (Belgium) Dirk De Sterck (Belgium) René Marin (Belgium) Luc Meeuson (Belgium) Jacky Delvaux | Rover K18 1.8L I4 | **D** | 401 |
| 23 | Cat.3 | 91 | (Belgium) EBRT | (Belgium) Jean-Pierre Van de Wauwer (Belgium) José Close (Italy) Lino Pecoraro | Lotus Elise | **Y** | 356 |
| 23 | Cat.3 | 91 | (Belgium) EBRT | (Belgium) Jean-Pierre Van de Wauwer (Belgium) José Close (Italy) Lino Pecoraro | Rover K18 1.8L I4 | **Y** | 356 |
| 24 | Cat.3 | 97 | (France) Eric van de Vyver | (France) Eric van de Vyver (France) Gérard Tremblay (Belgium) Sven Van Laere (Belgium) Willy Maljean | Porsche 911 Supercup | ? | 340 |
| 24 | Cat.3 | 97 | (France) Eric van de Vyver | (France) Eric van de Vyver (France) Gérard Tremblay (Belgium) Sven Van Laere (Belgium) Willy Maljean | Porsche 3.8L Flat-6 | ? | 340 |
| 25 DNF | GT | 3 | (Netherlands) Team Carsport Holland | (Netherlands) Jeroen Bleekemolen (Netherlands) Mike Hezemans (Belgium) Thierry Tassin | Chrysler Viper GTS-R | **M** | 474 |
| 25 DNF | GT | 3 | (Netherlands) Team Carsport Holland | (Netherlands) Jeroen Bleekemolen (Netherlands) Mike Hezemans (Belgium) Thierry Tassin | Chrysler 8.0L V10 | **M** | 474 |
| 26 DNF | N-GT | 62 | (France) JMB Competition | (Italy) Christian Pescatori (Italy) Andrea Garbagnati (France) David Terrien | Ferrari 360 Modena N-GT | **M** | 401 |
| 26 DNF | N-GT | 62 | (France) JMB Competition | (Italy) Christian Pescatori (Italy) Andrea Garbagnati (France) David Terrien | Ferrari 3.6L V8 | **M** | 401 |
| 27 DNF | N-GT | 81 | (United Kingdom) Cirtek Motorsport | (United Kingdom) Adam Jones (United Kingdom) Peter Hardman (United Kingdom) Ian Donaldson (United Kingdom) Gregor Fisken | Porsche 911 GT3-R | **D** | 210 |
| 27 DNF | N-GT | 81 | (United Kingdom) Cirtek Motorsport | (United Kingdom) Adam Jones (United Kingdom) Peter Hardman (United Kingdom) Ian Donaldson (United Kingdom) Gregor Fisken | Porsche 3.6L Flat-6 | **D** | 210 |
| 28 DNF | Cat.2 | 89 | (Belgium) Ecurie Azur | (Italy) Giovanni Bruno (France) François O'Born (France) Patrice Louette (Belgium) Thierry de Bonhomme | Renault Spider | **D** | 196 |
| 28 DNF | Cat.2 | 89 | (Belgium) Ecurie Azur | (Italy) Giovanni Bruno (France) François O'Born (France) Patrice Louette (Belgium) Thierry de Bonhomme | Renault 2.0L I4 | **D** | 196 |
| 29 DNF | Cat.3 | 93 | (France) Patrick Brisset | (France) Patrick Brisset (France) Gérard Larrousse (Germany) Frank Kremer | Lamborghini Diablo GTR | **P** | 154 |
| 29 DNF | Cat.3 | 93 | (France) Patrick Brisset | (France) Patrick Brisset (France) Gérard Larrousse (Germany) Frank Kremer | Lamborghini 6.0L V12 | **P** | 154 |
| 30 DNF | N-GT | 79 | (Germany) Seikel Motorsport | (Italy) Steffano Buttiero (Canada) Tony Burgess (United States) Philip Collin | Porsche 911 GT3-RS | **Y** | 153 |
| 30 DNF | N-GT | 79 | (Germany) Seikel Motorsport | (Italy) Steffano Buttiero (Canada) Tony Burgess (United States) Philip Collin | Porsche 3.6L Flat-6 | **Y** | 153 |
| 31 DNF | GT | 11 | (France) Paul Belmondo Racing | (France) Boris Derichebourg (France) Didier Defourny (Belgium) Frédéric Bouvy | Chrysler Viper GTS-R | **D** | 152 |
| 31 DNF | GT | 11 | (France) Paul Belmondo Racing | (France) Boris Derichebourg (France) Didier Defourny (Belgium) Frédéric Bouvy | Chrysler 8.0L V10 | **D** | 152 |
| 32 DNF | GT | 5 | (Italy) Team Rafanelli | (Italy) Emanuele Naspetti (Belgium) Philippe Steveny (Belgium) Eric van de Poele (Belgium) Martial Chouvel | Ferrari 550 Maranello | **M** | 150 |
| 32 DNF | GT | 5 | (Italy) Team Rafanelli | (Italy) Emanuele Naspetti (Belgium) Philippe Steveny (Belgium) Eric van de Poele (Belgium) Martial Chouvel | Ferrari 6.0L V12 | **M** | 150 |
| 33 DNF | N-GT | 58 | (Germany) Freisinger Motorsport | (France) Christophe Tinseau (France) Xavier Pompidou (Belgium) Vanina Ickx (Belgium) Tim Verbergt | Porsche 911 GT3-RS | **Y** | 136 |
| 33 DNF | N-GT | 58 | (Germany) Freisinger Motorsport | (France) Christophe Tinseau (France) Xavier Pompidou (Belgium) Vanina Ickx (Belgium) Tim Verbergt | Porsche 3.6L Flat-6 | **Y** | 136 |
| 34 DNF | GT | 18 | (Belgium) PSI Motorsport Team | (Belgium) Kurt Mollekens (Belgium) Eric Geboers (Belgium) Stéphane Cohen | Porsche 911 Bi-Turbo | **D** | 127 |
| 34 DNF | GT | 18 | (Belgium) PSI Motorsport Team | (Belgium) Kurt Mollekens (Belgium) Eric Geboers (Belgium) Stéphane Cohen | Porsche 3.6L Turbo Flat-6 | **D** | 127 |
| 35 DNF | Cat.2 | 88 | (Belgium) Belgian Racing | (Belgium) Sébastien Ugeux (Belgium) Nicolas Kropp (Belgium) Stéphane Vancampenhoudt | Gillet Vertigo Streiff | **Y** | 119 |
| 35 DNF | Cat.2 | 88 | (Belgium) Belgian Racing | (Belgium) Sébastien Ugeux (Belgium) Nicolas Kropp (Belgium) Stéphane Vancampenhoudt | Alfa Romeo 3.0L V6 | **Y** | 119 |
| 36 DNF | Cat.2 | 85 | (Belgium) JMT Racing | (Belgium) Thierry Boullion (Belgium) Loïc Deman (Belgium) Peter Van Delm (Belgium) Rudi Stevens | Porsche 964 Speedster | **P** | 103 |
| 36 DNF | Cat.2 | 85 | (Belgium) JMT Racing | (Belgium) Thierry Boullion (Belgium) Loïc Deman (Belgium) Peter Van Delm (Belgium) Rudi Stevens | Porsche 3.6L Flat-6 | **P** | 103 |
| 37 DNF | Cat.2 | 83 | (Spain) De Almenara Motorsport | (Belgium) Bernard de Dryver (Belgium) Louis Zurstrassen (Belgium) Damien Coens (France) Jean-Luc Blanchemain | Marcos Mantara LM600 | **M** | 84 |
| 37 DNF | Cat.2 | 83 | (Spain) De Almenara Motorsport | (Belgium) Bernard de Dryver (Belgium) Louis Zurstrassen (Belgium) Damien Coens (France) Jean-Luc Blanchemain | Chevrolet 5.9L V8 | **M** | 84 |
| 38 DNF | GT | 4 | (Netherlands) Team Carsport Holland | (Netherlands) Michael Bleekemolen (Netherlands) Sebastiaan Bleekemolen (Belgium) Jean-Michel Martin | Chrysler Viper GTS-R | **M** | 75 |
| 38 DNF | GT | 4 | (Netherlands) Team Carsport Holland | (Netherlands) Michael Bleekemolen (Netherlands) Sebastiaan Bleekemolen (Belgium) Jean-Michel Martin | Chrysler 8.0L V10 | **M** | 75 |
| DNS | N-GT | 60 | (Switzerland) Haberthur Racing | (Italy) Raffaele Sangiuolo (Belgium) Loris de Sordi (Belgium) Jacques Marquet (Japan) Masahiro Kimoto | Porsche 911 GT3-R | **D** | – |
| DNS | N-GT | 60 | (Switzerland) Haberthur Racing | (Italy) Raffaele Sangiuolo (Belgium) Loris de Sordi (Belgium) Jacques Marquet (Japan) Masahiro Kimoto | Porsche 3.6L Flat-6 | **D** | – |

== Statistics ==
- Pole position – #3 Team Carsport Holland – 2:24.053
- Fastest lap – #3 Team Carsport Holland – 2:23.001
- Distance – 3679.104 km
- Average speed – 152.999 km/h

FIA GT Championship
| Previous race: 2001 FIA GT Budapest 500km | 2001 season | Next race: 2001 FIA GT A1-Ring 500km |
