= 2001 FIA GT Nürburgring 500km =

Nürburgring (1995-2001)

The 2001 FIA GT Nürburgring 500 km was the ninth round the 2001 FIA GT Championship season. It took place at the Nürburgring, Germany, on September 9, 2001.

== Official results ==
Class winners in bold. Cars failing to complete 70% of winner's distance marked as Not Classified (NC).

Pos	Class	No	Team	Drivers	Chassis	Tyre	Laps
Pos	Class	No	Team	Drivers	Engine	Tyre	Laps
1	**GT**	**1**	**(United Kingdom) Lister Storm Racing**	**(United Kingdom) Jamie Campbell-Walter (United Kingdom) Mike Jordan**	**Lister Storm**	MI	**97**
1	**GT**	**1**	**(United Kingdom) Lister Storm Racing**	**(United Kingdom) Jamie Campbell-Walter (United Kingdom) Mike Jordan**	**Jaguar 7.0L V12**	MI	**97**
2	GT	3	(Netherlands) Team Carsport Holland	(Netherlands) Jeroen Bleekemolen (Netherlands) Mike Hezemans	Chrysler Viper GTS-R	MI	97
2	GT	3	(Netherlands) Team Carsport Holland	(Netherlands) Jeroen Bleekemolen (Netherlands) Mike Hezemans	Chrysler 8.0L V10	MI	97
3	GT	15	(United Kingdom) Prodrive All-Stars	(Sweden) Rickard Rydell (Netherlands) Peter Kox	Ferrari 550-GTS Maranello	D	97
3	GT	15	(United Kingdom) Prodrive All-Stars	(Sweden) Rickard Rydell (Netherlands) Peter Kox	Ferrari 5.9L V12	D	97
4	GT	12	(France) Paul Belmondo Racing	(France) Boris Derichebourg (Belgium) Vincent Vosse	Chrysler Viper GTS-R	D	96
4	GT	12	(France) Paul Belmondo Racing	(France) Boris Derichebourg (Belgium) Vincent Vosse	Chrysler 8.0L V10	D	96
5	GT	11	(France) Paul Belmondo Racing	(Belgium) Anthony Kumpen (France) Claude-Yves Gosselin (France) Paul Belmondo	Chrysler Viper GTS-R	D	96
5	GT	11	(France) Paul Belmondo Racing	(Belgium) Anthony Kumpen (France) Claude-Yves Gosselin (France) Paul Belmondo	Chrysler 8.0L V10	D	96
6	GT	2	(United Kingdom) Lister Storm Racing	(United Kingdom) Julian Bailey (Germany) Nicolaus Springer	Lister Storm	MI	95
6	GT	2	(United Kingdom) Lister Storm Racing	(United Kingdom) Julian Bailey (Germany) Nicolaus Springer	Jaguar 7.0L V12	MI	95
7	GT	7	(France) Larbre Compétition Chéreau	(France) Christophe Bouchut (France) Jean-Philippe Belloc	Chrysler Viper GTS-R	MI	95
7	GT	7	(France) Larbre Compétition Chéreau	(France) Christophe Bouchut (France) Jean-Philippe Belloc	Chrysler 8.0L V10	MI	95
8	GT	9	(France) Team A.R.T.	(France) Jean-Pierre Jarier (France) François Lafon	Chrysler Viper GTS-R	D	94
8	GT	9	(France) Team A.R.T.	(France) Jean-Pierre Jarier (France) François Lafon	Chrysler 8.0L V10	D	94
9	**N-GT**	**69**	**(Italy) Autorlando Sport**	**(Austria) Philipp Peter (Germany) Marco Werner**	**Porsche 911 GT3-RS**	P	**94**
9	**N-GT**	**69**	**(Italy) Autorlando Sport**	**(Austria) Philipp Peter (Germany) Marco Werner**	**Porsche 3.6L Flat-6**	P	**94**
10	N-GT	57	(Germany) Freisinger Motorsport	(United Kingdom) Robin Liddell (France) Stéphane Ortelli	Porsche 911 GT3-RS	Y	94
10	N-GT	57	(Germany) Freisinger Motorsport	(United Kingdom) Robin Liddell (France) Stéphane Ortelli	Porsche 3.6L Flat-6	Y	94
11	GT	21	(Belgium) GLPK Racing	(Belgium) Wim Daems (Germany) Georg Severich	Chrysler Viper GTS-R	D	94
11	GT	21	(Belgium) GLPK Racing	(Belgium) Wim Daems (Germany) Georg Severich	Chrysler 8.0L V10	D	94
12	N-GT	55	(France) Perspective Racing	(France) Thierry Perrier (Belgium) Michel Neugarten	Porsche 911 GT3-RS	D	93
12	N-GT	55	(France) Perspective Racing	(France) Thierry Perrier (Belgium) Michel Neugarten	Porsche 3.6L Flat-6	D	93
13	GT	18	(Belgium) PSI Motorsport Team	(Belgium) Kurt Mollekens (Belgium) Stéphane Cohen	Porsche 911 Bi-Turbo	D	93
13	GT	18	(Belgium) PSI Motorsport Team	(Belgium) Kurt Mollekens (Belgium) Stéphane Cohen	Porsche 3.6L Turbo Flat-6	D	93
14	N-GT	50	(France) Larbre Compétition Chéreau	(France) Sébastien Dumez (Germany) André Ahrlé	Porsche 911 GT3-RS	MI	93
14	N-GT	50	(France) Larbre Compétition Chéreau	(France) Sébastien Dumez (Germany) André Ahrlé	Porsche 3.6L Flat-6	MI	93
15	N-GT	70	(Germany) JVG Racing	(Germany) Jürgen von Gartzen (Switzerland) Bruno Eichmann	Porsche 911 GT3-RS	P	93
15	N-GT	70	(Germany) JVG Racing	(Germany) Jürgen von Gartzen (Switzerland) Bruno Eichmann	Porsche 3.6L Flat-6	P	93
16	GT	24	(Italy) Racing Box	(Italy) Luca Cappellari (Italy) Gabriele Matteuzzi (Italy) Stefano Zonca	Chrysler Viper GTS-R	D	92
16	GT	24	(Italy) Racing Box	(Italy) Luca Cappellari (Italy) Gabriele Matteuzzi (Italy) Stefano Zonca	Chrysler 8.0L V10	D	92
17	N-GT	77	(Germany) RWS Motorsport	(Italy) Luca Riccitelli (Austria) Dieter Quester	Porsche 911 GT3-RS	MI	92
17	N-GT	77	(Germany) RWS Motorsport	(Italy) Luca Riccitelli (Austria) Dieter Quester	Porsche 3.6L Flat-6	MI	92
18	N-GT	52	(United Kingdom) EMKA Racing	(United Kingdom) Tim Sugden (United Kingdom) Steve O'Rourke	Porsche 911 GT3-R	D	92
18	N-GT	52	(United Kingdom) EMKA Racing	(United Kingdom) Tim Sugden (United Kingdom) Steve O'Rourke	Porsche 3.6L Flat-6	D	92
19	GT	19	(Germany) Reiter Engineering	(Germany) Michael Trunk (Germany) Bernhard Müller	Lamborghini Diablo GT	D	92
19	GT	19	(Germany) Reiter Engineering	(Germany) Michael Trunk (Germany) Bernhard Müller	Lamborghini 6.0L V12	D	92
20	N-GT	62	(France) JMB Competition	(Italy) Christian Pescatori (France) David Terrien	Ferrari 360 Modena N-GT	MI	92
20	N-GT	62	(France) JMB Competition	(Italy) Christian Pescatori (France) David Terrien	Ferrari 3.6L V8	MI	92
21	N-GT	61	(Switzerland) Haberthur Racing	(United Kingdom) Nigel Smith (France) Sylvain Noël	Porsche 911 GT3-R	D	91
21	N-GT	61	(Switzerland) Haberthur Racing	(United Kingdom) Nigel Smith (France) Sylvain Noël	Porsche 3.6L Flat-6	D	91
22	GT	14	(Italy) Autorlando Sport	(Italy) Gabriele Sabatini (Italy) Raffaele Sangiuolo (Italy) Marco Spinelli	Porsche 911 GT2	P	91
22	GT	14	(Italy) Autorlando Sport	(Italy) Gabriele Sabatini (Italy) Raffaele Sangiuolo (Italy) Marco Spinelli	Porsche 3.8L Turbo Flat-6	P	91
23	N-GT	58	(Germany) Freisinger Motorsport	(United Kingdom) Paul Knapfield (France) Xavier Pompidou	Porsche 911 GT3-RS	Y	89
23	N-GT	58	(Germany) Freisinger Motorsport	(United Kingdom) Paul Knapfield (France) Xavier Pompidou	Porsche 3.6L Flat-6	Y	89
24	N-GT	59	(Germany) Freisinger Racing	(Russia) Alexey Vasilyev (Russia) Nikolai Fomenko	Porsche 911 GT3-R	Y	89
24	N-GT	59	(Germany) Freisinger Racing	(Russia) Alexey Vasilyev (Russia) Nikolai Fomenko	Porsche 3.6L Flat-6	Y	89
25	GT	28	(Germany) Wieth Racing	(Germany) Niko Wieth (Germany) Franz Wieth	Ferrari 550 Maranello	Y	86
25	GT	28	(Germany) Wieth Racing	(Germany) Niko Wieth (Germany) Franz Wieth	Ferrari 6.0L V12	Y	86
26	N-GT	74	(Germany) Jürgen Alzen Motorsport	(Germany) Jochen Berger (Germany) Thomas Koch	Porsche 911 GT3-RS	Y	81
26	N-GT	74	(Germany) Jürgen Alzen Motorsport	(Germany) Jochen Berger (Germany) Thomas Koch	Porsche 3.6L Flat-6	Y	81
27 DNF	N-GT	54	(Italy) ART Engineering	(Italy) Fabio Babini (Italy) Luigi Moccia	Porsche 911 GT3-RS	P	88
27 DNF	N-GT	54	(Italy) ART Engineering	(Italy) Fabio Babini (Italy) Luigi Moccia	Porsche 3.6L Flat-6	P	88
28 DNF	N-GT	75	(Germany) Jürgen Alzen Motorsport	(Germany) Jürgen Alzen (Germany) Wolf Henzler	Porsche 911 GT3-R	Y	81
28 DNF	N-GT	75	(Germany) Jürgen Alzen Motorsport	(Germany) Jürgen Alzen (Germany) Wolf Henzler	Porsche 3.6L Flat-6	Y	81
29 DNF	N-GT	76	(Germany) RWS Motorsport	(Austria) Toto Wolff (Italy) Gianni Collini	Porsche 911 GT3-R	MI	68
29 DNF	N-GT	76	(Germany) RWS Motorsport	(Austria) Toto Wolff (Italy) Gianni Collini	Porsche 3.6L Flat-6	MI	68
30 DNF	N-GT	53	(Italy) ART Engineering	(Slovakia) Jirko Malchárek (Italy) Andrea Bertolini	Porsche 911 GT3-R	P	39
30 DNF	N-GT	53	(Italy) ART Engineering	(Slovakia) Jirko Malchárek (Italy) Andrea Bertolini	Porsche 3.6L Flat-6	P	39
31 DNF	N-GT	63	(France) JMB Competition	(Italy) Andrea Garbagnati (Netherlands) Peter Kutemann (Switzerland) Iradj Alexander	Ferrari 360 Modena N-GT	MI	10
31 DNF	N-GT	63	(France) JMB Competition	(Italy) Andrea Garbagnati (Netherlands) Peter Kutemann (Switzerland) Iradj Alexander	Ferrari 3.6L V8	MI	10
32 DNF	GT	4	(Netherlands) Team Carsport Holland	(Netherlands) Michael Bleekemolen (Netherlands) Sebastiaan Bleekemolen	Chrysler Viper GTS-R	MI	1
32 DNF	GT	4	(Netherlands) Team Carsport Holland	(Netherlands) Michael Bleekemolen (Netherlands) Sebastiaan Bleekemolen	Chrysler 8.0L V10	MI	1
DNS	GT	8	(Germany) Proton Competition	(Germany) Christian Ried (Germany) Gerold Ried	Porsche 911 GT2	Y	–
DNS	GT	8	(Germany) Proton Competition	(Germany) Christian Ried (Germany) Gerold Ried	Porsche 3.8L Turbo Flat-6	Y	–

== Statistics ==
- Pole position – #15 Prodrive All-Stars – 1:39.651
- Fastest lap – #2 Lister Storm Racing – 1:40.252
- Average speed – 147.040 km/h

FIA GT Championship
Previous race: 2001 FIA GT A1-Ring 500km	2001 season	Next race: 2001 FIA GT Jarama 500km
