= 2001 FIA GT Jarama 500km =

Layout of the Jarama circuit

The 2001 FIA GT Jarama 500 km was the tenth round the 2001 FIA GT Championship season. It took place at the Circuito Permanente Del Jarama, Spain, on September 30, 2001.

== Official results ==
Class winners in bold. Cars failing to complete 70% of winner's distance marked as Not Classified (NC).

Pos	Class	No	Team	Drivers	Chassis	Tyre	Laps
Pos	Class	No	Team	Drivers	Engine	Tyre	Laps
1	**GT**	**15**	**(United Kingdom) Prodrive All-Stars**	**(Sweden) Rickard Rydell (Switzerland) Alain Menu**	**Ferrari 550-GTS Maranello**	D	**111**
1	**GT**	**15**	**(United Kingdom) Prodrive All-Stars**	**(Sweden) Rickard Rydell (Switzerland) Alain Menu**	**Ferrari 5.9L V12**	D	**111**
2	GT	12	(France) Paul Belmondo Racing	(France) Boris Derichebourg (Belgium) Vincent Vosse	Chrysler Viper GTS-R	D	111
2	GT	12	(France) Paul Belmondo Racing	(France) Boris Derichebourg (Belgium) Vincent Vosse	Chrysler 8.0L V10	D	111
3	GT	11	(France) Paul Belmondo Racing	(Belgium) Anthony Kumpen (France) Emmanuel Clérico	Chrysler Viper GTS-R	D	111
3	GT	11	(France) Paul Belmondo Racing	(Belgium) Anthony Kumpen (France) Emmanuel Clérico	Chrysler 8.0L V10	D	111
4	GT	7	(France) Larbre Compétition Chéreau	(France) Christophe Bouchut (France) Jean-Philippe Belloc	Chrysler Viper GTS-R	MI	111
4	GT	7	(France) Larbre Compétition Chéreau	(France) Christophe Bouchut (France) Jean-Philippe Belloc	Chrysler 8.0L V10	MI	111
5	GT	2	(United Kingdom) Lister Storm Racing	(United Kingdom) Julian Bailey (Germany) Nicolaus Springer	Lister Storm	MI	110
5	GT	2	(United Kingdom) Lister Storm Racing	(United Kingdom) Julian Bailey (Germany) Nicolaus Springer	Jaguar 7.0L V12	MI	110
6	GT	10	(France) Paul Belmondo Competition	(France) Paul Belmondo (France) Claude-Yves Gosselin	Chrysler Viper GTS-R	D	109
6	GT	10	(France) Paul Belmondo Competition	(France) Paul Belmondo (France) Claude-Yves Gosselin	Chrysler 8.0L V10	D	109
7	**N-GT**	**62**	**(France) JMB Competition**	**(Italy) Christian Pescatori (France) David Terrien**	**Ferrari 360 Modena N-GT**	MI	**109**
7	**N-GT**	**62**	**(France) JMB Competition**	**(Italy) Christian Pescatori (France) David Terrien**	**Ferrari 3.6L V8**	MI	**109**
8	N-GT	77	(Germany) RWS Motorsport	(Italy) Luca Riccitelli (Austria) Dieter Quester	Porsche 911 GT3-RS	MI	109
8	N-GT	77	(Germany) RWS Motorsport	(Italy) Luca Riccitelli (Austria) Dieter Quester	Porsche 3.6L Flat-6	MI	109
9	GT	21	(Belgium) GLPK Racing	(Belgium) Wim Daems (Belgium) Eric Geboers	Chrysler Viper GTS-R	D	108
9	GT	21	(Belgium) GLPK Racing	(Belgium) Wim Daems (Belgium) Eric Geboers	Chrysler 8.0L V10	D	108
10	N-GT	54	(Italy) ART Engineering	(Italy) Fabio Babini (Italy) Luigi Moccia	Porsche 911 GT3-RS	P	108
10	N-GT	54	(Italy) ART Engineering	(Italy) Fabio Babini (Italy) Luigi Moccia	Porsche 3.6L Flat-6	P	108
11	N-GT	57	(Germany) Freisinger Motorsport	(United Kingdom) Robin Liddell (France) Cyrille Sauvage	Porsche 911 GT3-RS	Y	108
11	N-GT	57	(Germany) Freisinger Motorsport	(United Kingdom) Robin Liddell (France) Cyrille Sauvage	Porsche 3.6L Flat-6	Y	108
12	GT	9	(France) Team A.R.T.	(France) Jean-Pierre Jarier (France) François Lafon	Chrysler Viper GTS-R	D	108
12	GT	9	(France) Team A.R.T.	(France) Jean-Pierre Jarier (France) François Lafon	Chrysler 8.0L V10	D	108
13	N-GT	53	(Italy) ART Engineering	(France) Laurent Cazenave (Italy) Andrea Bertolini	Porsche 911 GT3-R	P	107
13	N-GT	53	(Italy) ART Engineering	(France) Laurent Cazenave (Italy) Andrea Bertolini	Porsche 3.6L Flat-6	P	107
14	N-GT	72	(Spain) Escuderia Bengala (Spain) Paco Orti Racing	(Spain) Paco Orti (Germany) Wolfgang Kaufmann	Porsche 911 GT3-R	D	106
14	N-GT	72	(Spain) Escuderia Bengala (Spain) Paco Orti Racing	(Spain) Paco Orti (Germany) Wolfgang Kaufmann	Porsche 3.6L Flat-6	D	106
15	N-GT	52	(United Kingdom) EMKA Racing	(United Kingdom) Tim Sugden (United Kingdom) Steve O'Rourke	Porsche 911 GT3-R	D	106
15	N-GT	52	(United Kingdom) EMKA Racing	(United Kingdom) Tim Sugden (United Kingdom) Steve O'Rourke	Porsche 3.6L Flat-6	D	106
16	N-GT	61	(Switzerland) Haberthur Racing	(United Kingdom) Nigel Smith (France) Sylvain Noël	Porsche 911 GT3-R	D	105
16	N-GT	61	(Switzerland) Haberthur Racing	(United Kingdom) Nigel Smith (France) Sylvain Noël	Porsche 3.6L Flat-6	D	105
17	N-GT	63	(France) JMB Competition	(Italy) Andrea Garbagnati (Italy) Marco Lambertini	Ferrari 360 Modena N-GT	MI	104
17	N-GT	63	(France) JMB Competition	(Italy) Andrea Garbagnati (Italy) Marco Lambertini	Ferrari 3.6L V8	MI	104
18	GT	8	(Germany) Proton Competition	(Germany) Christian Ried (Germany) Gerold Ried	Porsche 911 GT2	Y	104
18	GT	8	(Germany) Proton Competition	(Germany) Christian Ried (Germany) Gerold Ried	Porsche 3.8L Turbo Flat-6	Y	104
19	N-GT	67	(Italy) MAC Racing	(Italy) Maurizio Lusuardi (Italy) Raffele Sangiuolo	Porsche 911 GT3-RS	D	99
19	N-GT	67	(Italy) MAC Racing	(Italy) Maurizio Lusuardi (Italy) Raffele Sangiuolo	Porsche 3.6L Flat-6	D	99
20	N-GT	50	(France) Larbre Compétition Chéreau	(France) Sébastien Dumez (France) Patrice Goueslard	Porsche 911 GT3-RS	MI	95
20	N-GT	50	(France) Larbre Compétition Chéreau	(France) Sébastien Dumez (France) Patrice Goueslard	Porsche 3.6L Flat-6	MI	95
21 DNF	GT	3	(Netherlands) Team Carsport Holland	(Netherlands) Jeroen Bleekemolen (Netherlands) Mike Hezemans	Chrysler Viper GTS-R	MI	85
21 DNF	GT	3	(Netherlands) Team Carsport Holland	(Netherlands) Jeroen Bleekemolen (Netherlands) Mike Hezemans	Chrysler 8.0L V10	MI	85
22 DNF	GT	24	(Italy) Racing Box	(Italy) Luca Cappellari (Italy) Gabriele Matteuzzi (Italy) Stefano Zonca	Chrysler Viper GTS-R	D	80
22 DNF	GT	24	(Italy) Racing Box	(Italy) Luca Cappellari (Italy) Gabriele Matteuzzi (Italy) Stefano Zonca	Chrysler 8.0L V10	D	80
23 DNF	GT	14	(Italy) Autorlando Sport	(Italy) Gabriele Sabatini (Italy) Marco Spinelli	Porsche 911 GT2	P	69
23 DNF	GT	14	(Italy) Autorlando Sport	(Italy) Gabriele Sabatini (Italy) Marco Spinelli	Porsche 3.8L Turbo Flat-6	P	69
24 DNF	N-GT	55	(France) Perspective Racing	(France) Thierry Perrier (Belgium) Michel Neugarten	Porsche 911 GT3-RS	D	69
24 DNF	N-GT	55	(France) Perspective Racing	(France) Thierry Perrier (Belgium) Michel Neugarten	Porsche 3.6L Flat-6	D	69
25 DNF	GT	4	(Netherlands) Team Carsport Holland	(Netherlands) Michael Bleekemolen (Netherlands) Sebastiaan Bleekemolen	Chrysler Viper GTS-R	MI	61
25 DNF	GT	4	(Netherlands) Team Carsport Holland	(Netherlands) Michael Bleekemolen (Netherlands) Sebastiaan Bleekemolen	Chrysler 8.0L V10	MI	61
26 DNF	N-GT	59	(Germany) Freisinger Racing	(Russia) Alexey Vasilyev (Russia) Nikolai Fomenko	Porsche 911 GT3-R	Y	49
26 DNF	N-GT	59	(Germany) Freisinger Racing	(Russia) Alexey Vasilyev (Russia) Nikolai Fomenko	Porsche 3.6L Flat-6	Y	49
27 DNF	GT	30	(Germany) Proton Competition	(Austria) Horst Felbermayr, Sr. (Austria) Horst Felbermayr, Jr.	Porsche 911 GT2	Y	41
27 DNF	GT	30	(Germany) Proton Competition	(Austria) Horst Felbermayr, Sr. (Austria) Horst Felbermayr, Jr.	Porsche 3.8L Turbo Flat-6	Y	41
28 DNF	N-GT	68	(Italy) MAC Racing	(Italy) Prisca Taruffi (Italy) Paolo Rapetti	Porsche 911 GT3-R	D	30
28 DNF	N-GT	68	(Italy) MAC Racing	(Italy) Prisca Taruffi (Italy) Paolo Rapetti	Porsche 3.6L Flat-6	D	30
29 DNF	N-GT	76	(Germany) RWS Motorsport	(Spain) Antonio García (Germany) Timo Bernhard	Porsche 911 GT3-R	MI	30
29 DNF	N-GT	76	(Germany) RWS Motorsport	(Spain) Antonio García (Germany) Timo Bernhard	Porsche 3.6L Flat-6	MI	30
30 DNF	GT	18	(Belgium) PSI Motorsport Team	(Belgium) Kurt Mollekens (Belgium) Stéphane Cohen	Porsche 911 Bi-Turbo	D	24
30 DNF	GT	18	(Belgium) PSI Motorsport Team	(Belgium) Kurt Mollekens (Belgium) Stéphane Cohen	Porsche 3.6L Turbo Flat-6	D	24
31 DNF	N-GT	69	(Italy) Autorlando Sport	(Switzerland) Andrea Chiesa (Switzerland) Joël Camathias	Porsche 911 GT3-RS	P	14
31 DNF	N-GT	69	(Italy) Autorlando Sport	(Switzerland) Andrea Chiesa (Switzerland) Joël Camathias	Porsche 3.6L Flat-6	P	14
32 DNF	GT	1	(United Kingdom) Lister Storm Racing	(United Kingdom) Jamie Campbell-Walter (United Kingdom) Bobby Verdon-Roe	Lister Storm	MI	13
32 DNF	GT	1	(United Kingdom) Lister Storm Racing	(United Kingdom) Jamie Campbell-Walter (United Kingdom) Bobby Verdon-Roe	Jaguar 7.0L V12	MI	13

== Statistics ==
- Pole position – #7 Larbre Compétition Chéreau – 1:32.630
- Fastest lap – #7 Larbre Compétition Chéreau – 1:32.399
- Average speed – 141.440 km/h

FIA GT Championship
Previous race: 2001 FIA GT Nürburgring 500km	2001 season	Next race: 2001 FIA GT Estoril 500km
