= 2001 FIA GT A1-Ring 500km =

Layout of the A1-Ring (1996-2003)

The 2001 FIA GT A1-Ring 500 km was the eighth round the 2001 FIA GT Championship season. It took place at the A1-Ring, Austria, on August 26, 2001.

== Official results ==
Class winners in bold. Cars failing to complete 70% of winner's distance marked as Not Classified (NC).

Pos	Class	No	Team	Drivers	Chassis	Tyre	Laps
Pos	Class	No	Team	Drivers	Engine	Tyre	Laps
1	**GT**	**15**	**(United Kingdom) Prodrive All-Stars**	**(Sweden) Rickard Rydell (Netherlands) Peter Kox**	**Ferrari 550-GTS Maranello**	D	**115**
1	**GT**	**15**	**(United Kingdom) Prodrive All-Stars**	**(Sweden) Rickard Rydell (Netherlands) Peter Kox**	**Ferrari 5.9L V12**	D	**115**
2	GT	3	(Netherlands) Team Carsport Holland	(Netherlands) Jeroen Bleekemolen (Netherlands) Mike Hezemans	Chrysler Viper GTS-R	MI	115
2	GT	3	(Netherlands) Team Carsport Holland	(Netherlands) Jeroen Bleekemolen (Netherlands) Mike Hezemans	Chrysler 8.0L V10	MI	115
3	GT	4	(Netherlands) Team Carsport Holland	(Netherlands) Michael Bleekemolen (Netherlands) Sebastiaan Bleekemolen	Chrysler Viper GTS-R	MI	115
3	GT	4	(Netherlands) Team Carsport Holland	(Netherlands) Michael Bleekemolen (Netherlands) Sebastiaan Bleekemolen	Chrysler 8.0L V10	MI	115
4	GT	2	(United Kingdom) Lister Storm Racing	(United Kingdom) Julian Bailey (Germany) Nicolaus Springer	Lister Storm	MI	115
4	GT	2	(United Kingdom) Lister Storm Racing	(United Kingdom) Julian Bailey (Germany) Nicolaus Springer	Jaguar 7.0L V12	MI	115
5	GT	7	(France) Larbre Compétition Chéreau	(France) Christophe Bouchut (France) Jean-Philippe Belloc	Chrysler Viper GTS-R	MI	113
5	GT	7	(France) Larbre Compétition Chéreau	(France) Christophe Bouchut (France) Jean-Philippe Belloc	Chrysler 8.0L V10	MI	113
6	GT	11	(France) Paul Belmondo Racing	(Belgium) Anthony Kumpen (France) Claude-Yves Gosselin (France) Paul Belmondo	Chrysler Viper GTS-R	D	113
6	GT	11	(France) Paul Belmondo Racing	(Belgium) Anthony Kumpen (France) Claude-Yves Gosselin (France) Paul Belmondo	Chrysler 8.0L V10	D	113
7	GT	24	(Italy) Racing Box	(Italy) Luca Cappellari (Italy) Gabriele Matteuzzi	Chrysler Viper GTS-R	D	111
7	GT	24	(Italy) Racing Box	(Italy) Luca Cappellari (Italy) Gabriele Matteuzzi	Chrysler 8.0L V10	D	111
8	**N-GT**	**62**	**(France) JMB Competition**	**(Italy) Christian Pescatori (France) David Terrien**	**Ferrari 360 Modena N-GT**	MI	**110**
8	**N-GT**	**62**	**(France) JMB Competition**	**(Italy) Christian Pescatori (France) David Terrien**	**Ferrari 3.6L V8**	MI	**110**
9	N-GT	57	(Germany) Freisinger Motorsport	(Portugal) Ni Amorim (France) Stéphane Ortelli	Porsche 911 GT3-RS	Y	109
9	N-GT	57	(Germany) Freisinger Motorsport	(Portugal) Ni Amorim (France) Stéphane Ortelli	Porsche 3.6L Flat-6	Y	109
10	N-GT	50	(France) Larbre Compétition Chéreau	(France) Sébastien Dumez (France) Patrice Goueslard	Porsche 911 GT3-RS	MI	109
10	N-GT	50	(France) Larbre Compétition Chéreau	(France) Sébastien Dumez (France) Patrice Goueslard	Porsche 3.6L Flat-6	MI	109
11	N-GT	52	(United Kingdom) EMKA Racing	(United Kingdom) Tim Sugden (United Kingdom) Steve O'Rourke	Porsche 911 GT3-R	D	109
11	N-GT	52	(United Kingdom) EMKA Racing	(United Kingdom) Tim Sugden (United Kingdom) Steve O'Rourke	Porsche 3.6L Flat-6	D	109
12	N-GT	55	(France) Perspective Racing	(France) Thierry Perrier (Belgium) Michel Neugarten	Porsche 911 GT3-RS	D	109
12	N-GT	55	(France) Perspective Racing	(France) Thierry Perrier (Belgium) Michel Neugarten	Porsche 3.6L Flat-6	D	109
13	N-GT	69	(Italy) Autorlando Sport	(Austria) Philipp Peter (Italy) Alessandro Zampedri	Porsche 911 GT3-RS	P	109
13	N-GT	69	(Italy) Autorlando Sport	(Austria) Philipp Peter (Italy) Alessandro Zampedri	Porsche 3.6L Flat-6	P	109
14	N-GT	54	(Italy) ART Engineering	(Italy) Fabio Babini (Italy) Luigi Moccia	Porsche 911 GT3-RS	P	109
14	N-GT	54	(Italy) ART Engineering	(Italy) Fabio Babini (Italy) Luigi Moccia	Porsche 3.6L Flat-6	P	109
15	N-GT	58	(Germany) Freisinger Motorsport	(Austria) Toto Wolff (Austria) Olivier Tichy	Porsche 911 GT3-RS	Y	109
15	N-GT	58	(Germany) Freisinger Motorsport	(Austria) Toto Wolff (Austria) Olivier Tichy	Porsche 3.6L Flat-6	Y	109
16	N-GT	53	(Italy) ART Engineering	(Slovakia) Jirko Malchárek (Italy) Andrea Bertolini	Porsche 911 GT3-R	P	108
16	N-GT	53	(Italy) ART Engineering	(Slovakia) Jirko Malchárek (Italy) Andrea Bertolini	Porsche 3.6L Flat-6	P	108
17	N-GT	70	(Germany) JVG Racing	(Germany) Jürgen von Gartzen (Switzerland) Bruno Eichmann	Porsche 911 GT3-RS	P	108
17	N-GT	70	(Germany) JVG Racing	(Germany) Jürgen von Gartzen (Switzerland) Bruno Eichmann	Porsche 3.6L Flat-6	P	108
18	N-GT	63	(France) JMB Competition	(Italy) Andrea Garbagnati (Italy) Batti Pregliasco	Ferrari 360 Modena N-GT	MI	107
18	N-GT	63	(France) JMB Competition	(Italy) Andrea Garbagnati (Italy) Batti Pregliasco	Ferrari 3.6L V8	MI	107
19	N-GT	59	(Germany) Freisinger Racing	(Russia) Alexey Vasilyev (Russia) Nikolai Fomenko	Porsche 911 GT3-R	Y	103
19	N-GT	59	(Germany) Freisinger Racing	(Russia) Alexey Vasilyev (Russia) Nikolai Fomenko	Porsche 3.6L Flat-6	Y	103
20	N-GT	67	(Italy) MAC Racing	(Italy) Maurizio Lusuardi (Italy) Raffaele Sangiuolo	Porsche 911 GT3-R	D	102
20	N-GT	67	(Italy) MAC Racing	(Italy) Maurizio Lusuardi (Italy) Raffaele Sangiuolo	Porsche 3.6L Flat-6	D	102
21 NC	GT	8	(Germany) Proton Competition	(Germany) Christian Ried (Austria) Horst Felbermayr, Sr. (Austria) Horst Felbermayr, Jr.	Porsche 911 GT2	Y	63
21 NC	GT	8	(Germany) Proton Competition	(Germany) Christian Ried (Austria) Horst Felbermayr, Sr. (Austria) Horst Felbermayr, Jr.	Porsche 3.8L Turbo Flat-6	Y	63
22 DNF	GT	14	(Italy) Autorlando Sport	(Italy) Gabriele Sabatini (Italy) Emanuele Moncini (Italy) Luciano Linossi	Porsche 911 GT2	P	89
22 DNF	GT	14	(Italy) Autorlando Sport	(Italy) Gabriele Sabatini (Italy) Emanuele Moncini (Italy) Luciano Linossi	Porsche 3.8L Turbo Flat-6	P	89
23 DNF	N-GT	77	(Germany) RWS Motorsport	(Italy) Luca Riccitelli (Austria) Dieter Quester	Porsche 911 GT3-RS	MI	88
23 DNF	N-GT	77	(Germany) RWS Motorsport	(Italy) Luca Riccitelli (Austria) Dieter Quester	Porsche 3.6L Flat-6	MI	88
24 DNF	GT	1	(United Kingdom) Lister Storm Racing	(United Kingdom) Jamie Campbell-Walter (Netherlands) Tom Coronel	Lister Storm	MI	63
24 DNF	GT	1	(United Kingdom) Lister Storm Racing	(United Kingdom) Jamie Campbell-Walter (Netherlands) Tom Coronel	Jaguar 7.0L V12	MI	63
25 DNF	GT	12	(France) Paul Belmondo Racing	(France) Boris Derichebourg (Belgium) Vincent Vosse	Chrysler Viper GTS-R	D	52
25 DNF	GT	12	(France) Paul Belmondo Racing	(France) Boris Derichebourg (Belgium) Vincent Vosse	Chrysler 8.0L V10	D	52
26 DNF	GT	5	(Italy) Team Rafanelli	(Italy) Emanuele Naspetti (Belgium) Marc Duez	Ferrari 550 Maranello	MI	48
26 DNF	GT	5	(Italy) Team Rafanelli	(Italy) Emanuele Naspetti (Belgium) Marc Duez	Ferrari 6.0L V12	MI	48
27 DNF	N-GT	76	(Germany) RWS Motorsport	(Italy) Fabio Mancini (Italy) Gianni Collini	Porsche 911 GT3-R	MI	40
27 DNF	N-GT	76	(Germany) RWS Motorsport	(Italy) Fabio Mancini (Italy) Gianni Collini	Porsche 3.6L Flat-6	MI	40
28 DNF	N-GT	61	(Switzerland) Haberthur Racing	(United Kingdom) Nigel Smith (Switzerland) Andrea Chiesa	Porsche 911 GT3-R	D	39
28 DNF	N-GT	61	(Switzerland) Haberthur Racing	(United Kingdom) Nigel Smith (Switzerland) Andrea Chiesa	Porsche 3.6L Flat-6	D	39
29 DNF	GT	19	(Germany) Reiter Engineering	(Germany) Michael Trunk (Germany) Bernhard Müller	Lamborghini Diablo GT	D	26
29 DNF	GT	19	(Germany) Reiter Engineering	(Germany) Michael Trunk (Germany) Bernhard Müller	Lamborghini 6.0L V12	D	26
30 DNF	GT	39	(France) Team A.R.T.	(France) Jean-Pierre Jarier (France) François Lafon	Lister Storm	D	8
30 DNF	GT	39	(France) Team A.R.T.	(France) Jean-Pierre Jarier (France) François Lafon	Jaguar 7.0L V12	D	8

== Statistics ==
- Pole position – #15 Prodrive All-Stars – 1:30.856
- Fastest lap – #1 Lister Storm Racing – 1:30.364
- Average speed – 165.670 km/h

FIA GT Championship
Previous race: 2001 Spa 24 Hours	2001 season	Next race: 2001 FIA GT Nürburgring 500km
