= 2001 FIA GT Silverstone 500km =

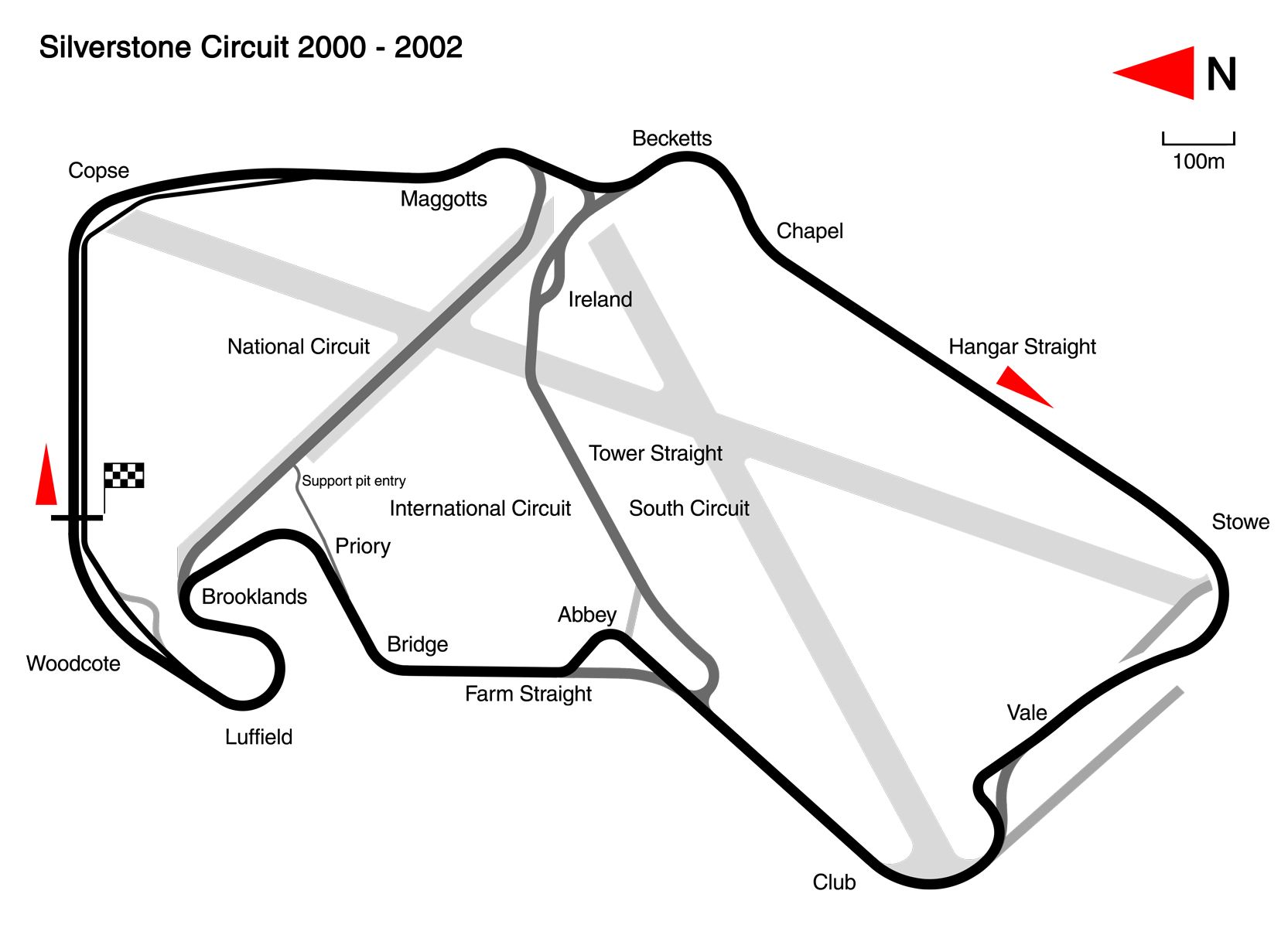
Map of the Silverstone Circuit (2000-2002)

The 2001 FIA GT Silverstone 500 km was the fourth round the 2001 FIA GT Championship season. It took place at the Silverstone Circuit, Great Britain, on May 13, 2001.

== Official results ==
Class winners in bold. Cars failing to complete 70% of winner's distance marked as Not Classified (NC).

Pos	Class	No	Team	Drivers	Chassis	Tyre	Laps
Pos	Class	No	Team	Drivers	Engine	Tyre	Laps
1	**GT**	**7**	**(France) Larbre Compétition Chéreau**	**(France) Christophe Bouchut (France) Jean-Philippe Belloc**	**Chrysler Viper GTS-R**	MI	**93**
1	**GT**	**7**	**(France) Larbre Compétition Chéreau**	**(France) Christophe Bouchut (France) Jean-Philippe Belloc**	**Chrysler 8.0L V10**	MI	**93**
2	GT	4	(Netherlands) Team Carsport Holland	(Netherlands) Michael Bleekemolen (Netherlands) Sebastiaan Bleekemolen	Chrysler Viper GTS-R	MI	93
2	GT	4	(Netherlands) Team Carsport Holland	(Netherlands) Michael Bleekemolen (Netherlands) Sebastiaan Bleekemolen	Chrysler 8.0L V10	MI	93
3	GT	10	(France) Paul Belmondo Competition	(France) Claude-Yves Gosselin (Belgium) Anthony Kumpen	Chrysler Viper GTS-R	D	93
3	GT	10	(France) Paul Belmondo Competition	(France) Claude-Yves Gosselin (Belgium) Anthony Kumpen	Chrysler 8.0L V10	D	93
4	GT	12	(France) Paul Belmondo Racing	(France) Boris Derichebourg (Belgium) Vincent Vosse	Chrysler Viper GTS-R	D	93
4	GT	12	(France) Paul Belmondo Racing	(France) Boris Derichebourg (Belgium) Vincent Vosse	Chrysler 8.0L V10	D	93
5	GT	5	(Italy) Team Rafanelli	(Italy) Emanuele Naspetti (Italy) Mimmo Schiattarella	Ferrari 550 Maranello	MI	92
5	GT	5	(Italy) Team Rafanelli	(Italy) Emanuele Naspetti (Italy) Mimmo Schiattarella	Ferrari 6.0L V12	MI	92
6	GT	11	(France) Paul Belmondo Racing	(France) Emmanuel Clérico (France) Didier Defourny	Chrysler Viper GTS-R	D	91
6	GT	11	(France) Paul Belmondo Racing	(France) Emmanuel Clérico (France) Didier Defourny	Chrysler 8.0L V10	D	91
7	**N-GT**	**62**	**(France) JMB Competition**	**(Italy) Christian Pescatori (France) David Terrien**	**Ferrari 360 Modena N-GT**	MI	**91**
7	**N-GT**	**62**	**(France) JMB Competition**	**(Italy) Christian Pescatori (France) David Terrien**	**Ferrari 3.6L V8**	MI	**91**
8	GT	24	(Italy) Racing Box	(Italy) Luca Cappellari (Italy) Gabriele Matteuzzi	Chrysler Viper GTS-R	D	91
8	GT	24	(Italy) Racing Box	(Italy) Luca Cappellari (Italy) Gabriele Matteuzzi	Chrysler 8.0L V10	D	91
9	N-GT	54	(Italy) ART Engineering	(Italy) Fabio Babini (Italy) Luigi Moccia	Porsche 911 GT3-RS	P	91
9	N-GT	54	(Italy) ART Engineering	(Italy) Fabio Babini (Italy) Luigi Moccia	Porsche 3.6L Flat-6	P	91
10	GT	9	(France) Team A.R.T.	(France) Jean-Pierre Jarier (France) François Lafon	Chrysler Viper GTS-R	D	90
10	GT	9	(France) Team A.R.T.	(France) Jean-Pierre Jarier (France) François Lafon	Chrysler 8.0L V10	D	90
11	N-GT	77	(Germany) RWS Motorsport	(Italy) Luca Riccitelli (United Kingdom) Johnny Mowlem	Porsche 911 GT3-RS	MI	90
11	N-GT	77	(Germany) RWS Motorsport	(Italy) Luca Riccitelli (United Kingdom) Johnny Mowlem	Porsche 3.6L Flat-6	MI	90
12	N-GT	50	(France) Larbre Compétition Chéreau	(France) Patrice Goueslard (France) Sébastien Dumez	Porsche 911 GT3-RS	MI	90
12	N-GT	50	(France) Larbre Compétition Chéreau	(France) Patrice Goueslard (France) Sébastien Dumez	Porsche 3.6L Flat-6	MI	90
13	N-GT	63	(France) JMB Competition	(Italy) Andrea Garbagnati (Italy) Batti Pregliasco	Ferrari 360 Modena N-GT	MI	89
13	N-GT	63	(France) JMB Competition	(Italy) Andrea Garbagnati (Italy) Batti Pregliasco	Ferrari 3.6L V8	MI	89
14	N-GT	52	(United Kingdom) EMKA Racing	(United Kingdom) Tim Sugden (United Kingdom) Steve O'Rourke	Porsche 911 GT3-R	D	89
14	N-GT	52	(United Kingdom) EMKA Racing	(United Kingdom) Tim Sugden (United Kingdom) Steve O'Rourke	Porsche 3.6L Flat-6	D	89
15	N-GT	60	(Switzerland) Haberthur Racing	(France) Sylvain Noël (France) Laurent Cazenave	Porsche 911 GT3-R	D	89
15	N-GT	60	(Switzerland) Haberthur Racing	(France) Sylvain Noël (France) Laurent Cazenave	Porsche 3.6L Flat-6	D	89
16	N-GT	53	(Italy) ART Engineering	(Italy) Alberto Radaelli (Italy) Andrea Bertolini	Porsche 911 GT3-R	P	89
16	N-GT	53	(Italy) ART Engineering	(Italy) Alberto Radaelli (Italy) Andrea Bertolini	Porsche 3.6L Flat-6	P	89
17	N-GT	61	(Switzerland) Haberthur Racing	(Italy) Maurizio Possumato (Portugal) Bernardo Sá Nogueira	Porsche 911 GT3-R	D	84
17	N-GT	61	(Switzerland) Haberthur Racing	(Italy) Maurizio Possumato (Portugal) Bernardo Sá Nogueira	Porsche 3.6L Flat-6	D	84
18	N-GT	59	(Germany) Freisinger Racing	(Russia) Alexey Vasilyev (Russia) Nikolai Fomenko	Porsche 911 GT3-R	Y	84
18	N-GT	59	(Germany) Freisinger Racing	(Russia) Alexey Vasilyev (Russia) Nikolai Fomenko	Porsche 3.6L Flat-6	Y	84
19	N-GT	58	(Germany) Freisinger Motorsport	(Japan) Yukihiro Hane (United Kingdom) Nigel Smith	Porsche 911 GT3-R	Y	84
19	N-GT	58	(Germany) Freisinger Motorsport	(Japan) Yukihiro Hane (United Kingdom) Nigel Smith	Porsche 3.6L Flat-6	Y	84
20	N-GT	67	(Italy) MAC Racing	(Italy) Maurizio Lusuardi (Italy) Raffaele Sangiuolo	Porsche 911 GT3-R	D	84
20	N-GT	67	(Italy) MAC Racing	(Italy) Maurizio Lusuardi (Italy) Raffaele Sangiuolo	Porsche 3.6L Flat-6	D	84
21	N-GT	65	(Czech Republic) Coca-Cola Racing Team	(Czech Republic) Robert Pergl (Slovakia) Jirko Malchárek (United States) Tom Sedivy	Porsche 911 GT3-RS	D	84
21	N-GT	65	(Czech Republic) Coca-Cola Racing Team	(Czech Republic) Robert Pergl (Slovakia) Jirko Malchárek (United States) Tom Sedivy	Porsche 3.6L Flat-6	D	84
22	GT	8	(Germany) Proton Competition	(Germany) Christian Ried (Germany) Gerold Ried	Porsche 911 GT2	Y	81
22	GT	8	(Germany) Proton Competition	(Germany) Christian Ried (Germany) Gerold Ried	Porsche 3.8L Turbo Flat-6	Y	81
23 DNF	GT	1	(United Kingdom) Lister Storm Racing	(United Kingdom) Jamie Campbell-Walter (Netherlands) Tom Coronel	Lister Storm	MI	90
23 DNF	GT	1	(United Kingdom) Lister Storm Racing	(United Kingdom) Jamie Campbell-Walter (Netherlands) Tom Coronel	Jaguar 7.0L V12	MI	90
24 DNF	GT	21	(Belgium) GLPK Racing	(Belgium) Wim Daems (Hungary) Tamás Illés	Chrysler Viper GTS-R	D	86
24 DNF	GT	21	(Belgium) GLPK Racing	(Belgium) Wim Daems (Hungary) Tamás Illés	Chrysler 8.0L V10	D	86
25 DNF	N-GT	57	(Germany) Freisinger Motorsport	(Germany) Wolfgang Kaufmann (France) Xavier Pompidou	Porsche 911 GT3-RS	Y	72
25 DNF	N-GT	57	(Germany) Freisinger Motorsport	(Germany) Wolfgang Kaufmann (France) Xavier Pompidou	Porsche 3.6L Flat-6	Y	72
26 DNF	GT	6	(Italy) Team Rafanelli	(Belgium) Marc Duez (Germany) Günther Blieninger	Ferrari 550 Maranello	MI	32
26 DNF	GT	6	(Italy) Team Rafanelli	(Belgium) Marc Duez (Germany) Günther Blieninger	Ferrari 6.0L V12	MI	32
27 DNF	GT	2	(United Kingdom) Lister Storm Racing	(United Kingdom) Julian Bailey (United Kingdom) David Warnock (Germany) Nicolaus Springer	Lister Storm	MI	31
27 DNF	GT	2	(United Kingdom) Lister Storm Racing	(United Kingdom) Julian Bailey (United Kingdom) David Warnock (Germany) Nicolaus Springer	Jaguar 7.0L V12	MI	31
28 DNF	N-GT	76	(Germany) RWS Motorsport	(Italy) Fabio Mancini (Italy) Gianni Collini	Porsche 911 GT3-R	MI	15
28 DNF	N-GT	76	(Germany) RWS Motorsport	(Italy) Fabio Mancini (Italy) Gianni Collini	Porsche 3.6L Flat-6	MI	15
29 DNF	GT	3	(Netherlands) Team Carsport Holland	(Netherlands) Jeroen Bleekemolen (Netherlands) Mike Hezemans	Chrysler Viper GTS-R	MI	1
29 DNF	GT	3	(Netherlands) Team Carsport Holland	(Netherlands) Jeroen Bleekemolen (Netherlands) Mike Hezemans	Chrysler 8.0L V10	MI	1
30 DNF	N-GT	51	(France) Larbre Compétition Chereau	(Germany) Jürgen van Gartzen (Switzerland) Bruno Eichmann	Porsche 911 GT3-RS	MI	1
30 DNF	N-GT	51	(France) Larbre Compétition Chereau	(Germany) Jürgen van Gartzen (Switzerland) Bruno Eichmann	Porsche 3.6L Flat-6	MI	1
31 DNF	N-GT	55	(France) Perspective Racing	(France) Thierry Perrier (Belgium) Michel Neugarten	Porsche 911 GT3-RS	D	1
31 DNF	N-GT	55	(France) Perspective Racing	(France) Thierry Perrier (Belgium) Michel Neugarten	Porsche 3.6L Flat-6	D	1

== Statistics ==
- Pole position – #3 Team Carsport Holland – 1:48.575
- Fastest lap – #1 Lister Storm Racing – 1:49.625
- Average speed – 158.860 km/h

FIA GT Championship
Previous race: 2001 FIA GT Magny-Cours 500km	2001 season	Next race: 2001 FIA GT Zolder 500km
