= 2001 FIA GT Brno 500 km =

Sports car race held in the Czech Republic

Layout of the Brno Circuit

The 2001 FIA GT Brno 500 km was the second round the 2001 FIA GT Championship season. It took place at the Masaryk Circuit, Czech Republic, on April 16, 2001.

== Official results ==
Class winners in bold. Cars failing to complete 70% of winner's distance marked as Not Classified (NC).

Pos	Class	No	Team	Drivers	Chassis	Tyre	Laps
Pos	Class	No	Team	Drivers	Engine	Tyre	Laps
1	**GT**	**7**	**(France) Larbre Compétition Chéreau**	**(France) Christophe Bouchut (France) Jean-Philippe Belloc**	**Chrysler Viper GTS-R**	MI	**77**
1	**GT**	**7**	**(France) Larbre Compétition Chéreau**	**(France) Christophe Bouchut (France) Jean-Philippe Belloc**	**Chrysler 8.0L V10**	MI	**77**
2	GT	12	(France) Paul Belmondo Racing	(France) Boris Derichebourg (Belgium) Vincent Vosse	Chrysler Viper GTS-R	D	77
2	GT	12	(France) Paul Belmondo Racing	(France) Boris Derichebourg (Belgium) Vincent Vosse	Chrysler 8.0L V10	D	77
3	GT	3	(Netherlands) Team Carsport Holland	(Netherlands) Jeroen Bleekemolen (Netherlands) Mike Hezemans	Chrysler Viper GTS-R	MI	77
3	GT	3	(Netherlands) Team Carsport Holland	(Netherlands) Jeroen Bleekemolen (Netherlands) Mike Hezemans	Chrysler 8.0L V10	MI	77
4	GT	1	(United Kingdom) Lister Storm Racing	(United Kingdom) Jamie Campbell-Walter (United Kingdom) Richard Dean	Lister Storm	MI	77
4	GT	1	(United Kingdom) Lister Storm Racing	(United Kingdom) Jamie Campbell-Walter (United Kingdom) Richard Dean	Jaguar 7.0L V12	MI	77
5	GT	5	(Italy) Team Rafanelli	(Italy) Emanuele Naspetti (Italy) Mimmo Schiattarella	Ferrari 550 Maranello	MI	76
5	GT	5	(Italy) Team Rafanelli	(Italy) Emanuele Naspetti (Italy) Mimmo Schiattarella	Ferrari 6.0L V12	MI	76
6	GT	6	(Italy) Team Rafanelli	(Belgium) Marc Duez (Germany) Günther Blieninger	Ferrari 550 Maranello	MI	75
6	GT	6	(Italy) Team Rafanelli	(Belgium) Marc Duez (Germany) Günther Blieninger	Ferrari 6.0L V12	MI	75
7	GT	10	(France) Paul Belmondo Competition	(France) Paul Belmondo (Belgium) Didier Defourny	Chrysler Viper GTS-R	D	75
7	GT	10	(France) Paul Belmondo Competition	(France) Paul Belmondo (Belgium) Didier Defourny	Chrysler 8.0L V10	D	75
8	GT	21	(Belgium) GLPK Racing	(Belgium) Wim Daems (Hungary) Tamás Illés	Chrysler Viper GTS-R	D	75
8	GT	21	(Belgium) GLPK Racing	(Belgium) Wim Daems (Hungary) Tamás Illés	Chrysler 8.0L V10	D	75
9	**N-GT**	**77**	**(Germany) RWS Motorsport**	**(Italy) Luca Riccitelli (Austria) Dieter Quester**	**Porsche 911 GT3-RS**	MI	**75**
9	**N-GT**	**77**	**(Germany) RWS Motorsport**	**(Italy) Luca Riccitelli (Austria) Dieter Quester**	**Porsche 3.6L Flat-6**	MI	**75**
10	N-GT	62	(France) JMB Competition	(Italy) Christian Pescatori (France) David Terrien	Ferrari 360 Modena N-GT	MI	75
10	N-GT	62	(France) JMB Competition	(Italy) Christian Pescatori (France) David Terrien	Ferrari 3.6L V8	MI	75
11	GT	2	(United Kingdom) Lister Storm Racing	(United Kingdom) Julian Bailey (Germany) Nicolaus Springer	Lister Storm	MI	75
11	GT	2	(United Kingdom) Lister Storm Racing	(United Kingdom) Julian Bailey (Germany) Nicolaus Springer	Jaguar 7.0L V12	MI	75
12	N-GT	51	(France) Larbre Compétition Chéreau	(Germany) Jürgen van Gartzen (Switzerland) Bruno Eichmann	Porsche 911 GT3-RS	MI	75
12	N-GT	51	(France) Larbre Compétition Chéreau	(Germany) Jürgen van Gartzen (Switzerland) Bruno Eichmann	Porsche 3.6L Flat-6	MI	75
13	GT	14	(Italy) Autorlando Sport	(Italy) Marco Spinelli (Italy) Mauro Casadei (Italy) Gabriele Sabatini	Porsche 911 GT2	P	74
13	GT	14	(Italy) Autorlando Sport	(Italy) Marco Spinelli (Italy) Mauro Casadei (Italy) Gabriele Sabatini	Porsche 3.8L Turbo Flat-6	P	74
14	GT	9	(France) Team A.R.T.	(France) Jean-Pierre Jarier (France) François Lafon	Chrysler Viper GTS-R	D	74
14	GT	9	(France) Team A.R.T.	(France) Jean-Pierre Jarier (France) François Lafon	Chrysler 8.0L V10	D	74
15	N-GT	50	(France) Larbre Compétition Chéreau	(France) Patrice Goueslard (France) Sébastien Dumez	Porsche 911 GT3-RS	MI	74
15	N-GT	50	(France) Larbre Compétition Chéreau	(France) Patrice Goueslard (France) Sébastien Dumez	Porsche 3.6L Flat-6	MI	74
16	N-GT	55	(France) Perspective Racing	(France) Thierry Perrier (Belgium) Michel Neugarten	Porsche 911 GT3-RS	D	74
16	N-GT	55	(France) Perspective Racing	(France) Thierry Perrier (Belgium) Michel Neugarten	Porsche 3.6L Flat-6	D	74
17	N-GT	69	(Italy) Autorlando Sport	(Venezuela) Johnny Cecotto (Austria) Philipp Peter	Porsche 911 GT3-RS	P	74
17	N-GT	69	(Italy) Autorlando Sport	(Venezuela) Johnny Cecotto (Austria) Philipp Peter	Porsche 3.6L Flat-6	P	74
18	N-GT	65	(Czech Republic) Coca-Cola Racing Team	(Czech Republic) Tomáš Enge (Slovakia) Jirko Malchárek	Porsche 911 GT3-RS	D	73
18	N-GT	65	(Czech Republic) Coca-Cola Racing Team	(Czech Republic) Tomáš Enge (Slovakia) Jirko Malchárek	Porsche 3.6L Flat-6	D	73
19	GT	25	(Belgium) Silver Racing	(Belgium) Robert Dierick (Belgium) Eric De Doncker	Chrysler Viper GTS-R	D	73
19	GT	25	(Belgium) Silver Racing	(Belgium) Robert Dierick (Belgium) Eric De Doncker	Chrysler 8.0L V10	D	73
20	N-GT	57	(Germany) Freisinger Motorsport	(Germany) Wolfgang Kaufmann (France) Stéphane Ortelli	Porsche 911 GT3-RS	Y	73
20	N-GT	57	(Germany) Freisinger Motorsport	(Germany) Wolfgang Kaufmann (France) Stéphane Ortelli	Porsche 3.6L Flat-6	Y	73
21	N-GT	54	(Italy) ART Engineering	(Italy) Fabio Babini (Italy) Luigi Moccia	Porsche 911 GT3-RS	P	73
21	N-GT	54	(Italy) ART Engineering	(Italy) Fabio Babini (Italy) Luigi Moccia	Porsche 3.6L Flat-6	P	73
22	N-GT	60	(Switzerland) Haberthur Racing	(France) Sylvain Noël (France) Laurent Cazenave	Porsche 911 GT3-R	D	72
22	N-GT	60	(Switzerland) Haberthur Racing	(France) Sylvain Noël (France) Laurent Cazenave	Porsche 3.6L Flat-6	D	72
23	N-GT	52	(United Kingdom) EMKA Racing	(United Kingdom) Tim Sugden (United Kingdom) Steve O'Rourke	Porsche 911 GT3-R	D	72
23	N-GT	52	(United Kingdom) EMKA Racing	(United Kingdom) Tim Sugden (United Kingdom) Steve O'Rourke	Porsche 3.6L Flat-6	D	72
24	N-GT	53	(Italy) ART Engineering	(Italy) Alberto Radaelli (Italy) Andrea Bertolini	Porsche 911 GT3-R	P	72
24	N-GT	53	(Italy) ART Engineering	(Italy) Alberto Radaelli (Italy) Andrea Bertolini	Porsche 3.6L Flat-6	P	72
25	N-GT	76	(Germany) RWS Motorsport	(Italy) Fabio Mancini (Italy) Gianni Collini	Porsche 911 GT3-R	MI	72
25	N-GT	76	(Germany) RWS Motorsport	(Italy) Fabio Mancini (Italy) Gianni Collini	Porsche 3.6L Flat-6	MI	72
26	GT	8	(Germany) Proton Competition	(Germany) Christian Ried (Germany) Gerold Ried	Porsche 911 GT2	Y	71
26	GT	8	(Germany) Proton Competition	(Germany) Christian Ried (Germany) Gerold Ried	Porsche 3.8L Turbo Flat-6	Y	71
27	N-GT	58	(Germany) Freisinger Motorsport	(Japan) Yukihiro Hane (United Kingdom) Nigel Smith	Porsche 911 GT3-R	Y	69
27	N-GT	58	(Germany) Freisinger Motorsport	(Japan) Yukihiro Hane (United Kingdom) Nigel Smith	Porsche 3.6L Flat-6	Y	69
28	N-GT	64	(Czech Republic) Coca-Cola Racing Team	(Czech Republic) Milan Maderyč (United States) Tom Sedivy (United States) Bobby Brown	Porsche 911 GT3-R	D	63
28	N-GT	64	(Czech Republic) Coca-Cola Racing Team	(Czech Republic) Milan Maderyč (United States) Tom Sedivy (United States) Bobby Brown	Porsche 3.6L Flat-6	D	63
29 DNF	GT	11	(France) Paul Belmondo Racing	(France) Emmanuel Clérico (Belgium) Anthony Kumpen	Chrysler Viper GTS-R	D	59
29 DNF	GT	11	(France) Paul Belmondo Racing	(France) Emmanuel Clérico (Belgium) Anthony Kumpen	Chrysler 8.0L V10	D	59
30 DNF	N-GT	59	(Germany) Freisinger Racing	(Russia) Alexey Vasilyev (Russia) Nikolai Fomenko (United Kingdom) Richard Kaye	Porsche 911 GT3-R	Y	38
30 DNF	N-GT	59	(Germany) Freisinger Racing	(Russia) Alexey Vasilyev (Russia) Nikolai Fomenko (United Kingdom) Richard Kaye	Porsche 3.6L Flat-6	Y	38
31 DNF	GT	4	(Netherlands) Team Carsport Holland	(Netherlands) Michael Bleekemolen (Netherlands) Sebastiaan Bleekemolen	Chrysler Viper GTS-R	MI	33
31 DNF	GT	4	(Netherlands) Team Carsport Holland	(Netherlands) Michael Bleekemolen (Netherlands) Sebastiaan Bleekemolen	Chrysler 8.0L V10	MI	33
32 DNF	GT	24	(Italy) Racing Box	(Italy) Luca Cappalleri (Italy) Gabriele Matteuzzi	Chrysler Viper GTS-R	D	22
32 DNF	GT	24	(Italy) Racing Box	(Italy) Luca Cappalleri (Italy) Gabriele Matteuzzi	Chrysler 8.0L V10	D	22
33 DNF	GT	28	(Germany) Wieth Racing	(Germany) Niko Wieth (Germany) Franz Wieth	Ferrari 550 Maranello	Y	21
33 DNF	GT	28	(Germany) Wieth Racing	(Germany) Niko Wieth (Germany) Franz Wieth	Ferrari 6.0L V12	Y	21

== Statistics ==
- Pole position – #11 Paul Belmondo Racing – 2:02.739
- Fastest lap – #1 Lister Storm Racing – 2:02.037
- Average speed – 138.444 km/h

FIA GT Championship
Previous race: 2001 FIA GT Monza 500km	2001 season	Next race: 2001 FIA GT Magny-Cours 500km
