= 2001 FIA GT Magny-Cours 500km =

Layout of the Circuit de Nevers Magny-Cours (1992-2002)

The 2001 FIA GT Magny-Cours 500 km was the third round the 2001 FIA GT Championship season. It took place at the Circuit de Nevers Magny-Cours, France, on May 1, 2001.

== Official results ==
Class winners in bold. Cars failing to complete 70% of winner's distance marked as Not Classified (NC).

Pos	Class	No	Team	Drivers	Chassis	Tyre	Laps
Pos	Class	No	Team	Drivers	Engine	Tyre	Laps
1	**GT**	**1**	**(United Kingdom) Lister Storm Racing**	**(United Kingdom) Jamie Campbell-Walter (Netherlands) Tom Coronel**	**Lister Storm**	MI	**107**
1	**GT**	**1**	**(United Kingdom) Lister Storm Racing**	**(United Kingdom) Jamie Campbell-Walter (Netherlands) Tom Coronel**	**Jaguar 7.0L V12**	MI	**107**
2	GT	7	(France) Larbre Compétition Chéreau	(France) Christophe Bouchut (France) Jean-Philippe Belloc	Chrysler Viper GTS-R	MI	107
2	GT	7	(France) Larbre Compétition Chéreau	(France) Christophe Bouchut (France) Jean-Philippe Belloc	Chrysler 8.0L V10	MI	107
3	GT	12	(France) Paul Belmondo Racing	(France) Boris Derichebourg (Belgium) Vincent Vosse	Chrysler Viper GTS-R	D	106
3	GT	12	(France) Paul Belmondo Racing	(France) Boris Derichebourg (Belgium) Vincent Vosse	Chrysler 8.0L V10	D	106
4	GT	5	(Italy) Team Rafanelli	(Italy) Emanuele Naspetti (Italy) Mimmo Schiattarella	Ferrari 550 Maranello	MI	105
4	GT	5	(Italy) Team Rafanelli	(Italy) Emanuele Naspetti (Italy) Mimmo Schiattarella	Ferrari 6.0L V12	MI	105
5	GT	2	(United Kingdom) Lister Storm Racing	(United Kingdom) Julian Bailey (Germany) Nicolaus Springer	Lister Storm	MI	105
5	GT	2	(United Kingdom) Lister Storm Racing	(United Kingdom) Julian Bailey (Germany) Nicolaus Springer	Jaguar 7.0L V12	MI	105
6	GT	4	(Netherlands) Team Carsport Holland	(Netherlands) Michael Bleekemolen (Netherlands) Sebastiaan Bleekemolen	Chrysler Viper GTS-R	MI	105
6	GT	4	(Netherlands) Team Carsport Holland	(Netherlands) Michael Bleekemolen (Netherlands) Sebastiaan Bleekemolen	Chrysler 8.0L V10	MI	105
7	GT	6	(Italy) Team Rafanelli	(Belgium) Marc Duez (Germany) Günther Blieninger	Ferrari 550 Maranello	MI	104
7	GT	6	(Italy) Team Rafanelli	(Belgium) Marc Duez (Germany) Günther Blieninger	Ferrari 6.0L V12	MI	104
8	GT	24	(Italy) Racing Box	(Italy) Luca Cappellari (Italy) Gabriele Matteuzzi	Chrysler Viper GTS-R	D	103
8	GT	24	(Italy) Racing Box	(Italy) Luca Cappellari (Italy) Gabriele Matteuzzi	Chrysler 8.0L V10	D	103
9	**N-GT**	**62**	**(France) JMB Competition**	**(Italy) Christian Pescatori (France) David Terrien**	**Ferrari 360 Modena N-GT**	MI	**102**
9	**N-GT**	**62**	**(France) JMB Competition**	**(Italy) Christian Pescatori (France) David Terrien**	**Ferrari 3.6L V8**	MI	**102**
10	N-GT	77	(Germany) RWS Motorsport	(Italy) Luca Riccitelli (Austria) Dieter Quester	Porsche 911 GT3-RS	MI	102
10	N-GT	77	(Germany) RWS Motorsport	(Italy) Luca Riccitelli (Austria) Dieter Quester	Porsche 3.6L Flat-6	MI	102
11	N-GT	65	(Czech Republic) Coca-Cola Racing Team	(Czech Republic) Tomáš Enge (United Kingdom) Justin Wilson	Porsche 911 GT3-RS	D	102
11	N-GT	65	(Czech Republic) Coca-Cola Racing Team	(Czech Republic) Tomáš Enge (United Kingdom) Justin Wilson	Porsche 3.6L Flat-6	D	102
12	N-GT	57	(Germany) Freisinger Motorsport	(Germany) Wolfgang Kaufmann (France) Stéphane Ortelli	Porsche 911 GT3-RS	Y	102
12	N-GT	57	(Germany) Freisinger Motorsport	(Germany) Wolfgang Kaufmann (France) Stéphane Ortelli	Porsche 3.6L Flat-6	Y	102
13	GT	21	(Belgium) GLPK Racing	(Belgium) Wim Daems (Hungary) Tamás Illés	Chrysler Viper GTS-R	D	101
13	GT	21	(Belgium) GLPK Racing	(Belgium) Wim Daems (Hungary) Tamás Illés	Chrysler 8.0L V10	D	101
14	N-GT	50	(France) Larbre Compétition Chéreau	(France) Patrice Goueslard (France) Sébastien Dumez (France) Jean-Luc Chéreau	Porsche 911 GT3-RS	MI	101
14	N-GT	50	(France) Larbre Compétition Chéreau	(France) Patrice Goueslard (France) Sébastien Dumez (France) Jean-Luc Chéreau	Porsche 3.6L Flat-6	MI	101
15	N-GT	76	(Germany) RWS Motorsport	(Italy) Fabio Mancini (Italy) Gianni Collini (Italy) Giovanni Gulinelli	Porsche 911 GT3-R	MI	100
15	N-GT	76	(Germany) RWS Motorsport	(Italy) Fabio Mancini (Italy) Gianni Collini (Italy) Giovanni Gulinelli	Porsche 3.6L Flat-6	MI	100
16	N-GT	58	(Germany) Freisinger Motorsport	(Japan) Yukihiro Hane (United Kingdom) Nigel Smith	Porsche 911 GT3-R	Y	100
16	N-GT	58	(Germany) Freisinger Motorsport	(Japan) Yukihiro Hane (United Kingdom) Nigel Smith	Porsche 3.6L Flat-6	Y	100
17	N-GT	55	(France) Perspective Racing	(France) Thierry Perrier (Belgium) Michel Neugarten	Porsche 911 GT3-RS	D	100
17	N-GT	55	(France) Perspective Racing	(France) Thierry Perrier (Belgium) Michel Neugarten	Porsche 3.6L Flat-6	D	100
18	N-GT	51	(France) Larbre Compétition Chereau	(Germany) Jürgen van Gartzen (Switzerland) Bruno Eichmann	Porsche 911 GT3-RS	MI	100
18	N-GT	51	(France) Larbre Compétition Chereau	(Germany) Jürgen van Gartzen (Switzerland) Bruno Eichmann	Porsche 3.6L Flat-6	MI	100
19	N-GT	60	(Switzerland) Haberthur Racing	(France) Sylvain Noël (France) Laurent Cazenave	Porsche 911 GT3-R	D	100
19	N-GT	60	(Switzerland) Haberthur Racing	(France) Sylvain Noël (France) Laurent Cazenave	Porsche 3.6L Flat-6	D	100
20	N-GT	53	(Italy) ART Engineering	(Italy) Alberto Radaelli (Italy) Andrea Bertolini	Porsche 911 GT3-R	P	99
20	N-GT	53	(Italy) ART Engineering	(Italy) Alberto Radaelli (Italy) Andrea Bertolini	Porsche 3.6L Flat-6	P	99
21	N-GT	52	(United Kingdom) EMKA Racing	(United Kingdom) Tim Sugden (United Kingdom) Steve O'Rourke	Porsche 911 GT3-R	D	99
21	N-GT	52	(United Kingdom) EMKA Racing	(United Kingdom) Tim Sugden (United Kingdom) Steve O'Rourke	Porsche 3.6L Flat-6	D	99
22	N-GT	59	(Germany) Freisinger Racing	(Russia) Alexey Vasilyev (Russia) Nikolai Fomenko (United Kingdom) Richard Kaye	Porsche 911 GT3-R	Y	96
22	N-GT	59	(Germany) Freisinger Racing	(Russia) Alexey Vasilyev (Russia) Nikolai Fomenko (United Kingdom) Richard Kaye	Porsche 3.6L Flat-6	Y	96
23	N-GT	67	(Italy) MAC Racing	(Italy) Maurizio Lasuardi (Italy) Raffaele Sangiuolo	Porsche 911 GT3-R	D	95
23	N-GT	67	(Italy) MAC Racing	(Italy) Maurizio Lasuardi (Italy) Raffaele Sangiuolo	Porsche 3.6L Flat-6	D	95
24 DNF	N-GT	54	(Italy) ART Engineering	(Italy) Fabio Babini (Italy) Luigi Moccia	Porsche 911 GT3-RS	P	94
24 DNF	N-GT	54	(Italy) ART Engineering	(Italy) Fabio Babini (Italy) Luigi Moccia	Porsche 3.6L Flat-6	P	94
25 DNF	GT	3	(Netherlands) Team Carsport Holland	(Netherlands) Jeroen Bleekemolen (Netherlands) Mike Hezemans	Chrysler Viper GTS-R	MI	76
25 DNF	GT	3	(Netherlands) Team Carsport Holland	(Netherlands) Jeroen Bleekemolen (Netherlands) Mike Hezemans	Chrysler 8.0L V10	MI	76
26 DNF	N-GT	63	(France) JMB Competition	(Italy) Marco Lambertini (Italy) Andrea Garbagnati (Italy) Batti Pregliasco	Ferrari 360 Modena N-GT	MI	73
26 DNF	N-GT	63	(France) JMB Competition	(Italy) Marco Lambertini (Italy) Andrea Garbagnati (Italy) Batti Pregliasco	Ferrari 3.6L V8	MI	73
27 DNF	GT	25	(Belgium) Silver Racing	(Belgium) Robert Dierickx (Belgium) Eric de Doncker	Chrysler Viper GTS-R	D	56
27 DNF	GT	25	(Belgium) Silver Racing	(Belgium) Robert Dierickx (Belgium) Eric de Doncker	Chrysler 8.0L V10	D	56
28 DNF	GT	9	(France) Team A.R.T.	(France) Jean-Pierre Jarier (France) François Lafon	Chrysler Viper GTS-R	D	54
28 DNF	GT	9	(France) Team A.R.T.	(France) Jean-Pierre Jarier (France) François Lafon	Chrysler 8.0L V10	D	54
29 DNF	GT	8	(Germany) Proton Competition	(Germany) Christian Ried (Germany) Gerold Ried (Italy) Luca Pazzaglia	Porsche 911 GT2	Y	51
29 DNF	GT	8	(Germany) Proton Competition	(Germany) Christian Ried (Germany) Gerold Ried (Italy) Luca Pazzaglia	Porsche 3.8L Turbo Flat-6	Y	51
30 DNF	N-GT	69	(Italy) Autorlando Sport	(Switzerland) Joël Camathias (Austria) Philipp Peter	Porsche 911 GT3-RS	P	50
30 DNF	N-GT	69	(Italy) Autorlando Sport	(Switzerland) Joël Camathias (Austria) Philipp Peter	Porsche 3.6L Flat-6	P	50
31 DNF	GT	10	(France) Paul Belmondo Competition	(France) Claude-Yves Gosselin (Belgium) Anthony Kumpen	Chrysler Viper GTS-R	D	44
31 DNF	GT	10	(France) Paul Belmondo Competition	(France) Claude-Yves Gosselin (Belgium) Anthony Kumpen	Chrysler 8.0L V10	D	44
32 DNF	GT	11	(France) Paul Belmondo Racing	(France) Emmanuel Clérico (France) Paul Belmondo (France) Didier Defourny	Chrysler Viper GTS-R	D	22
32 DNF	GT	11	(France) Paul Belmondo Racing	(France) Emmanuel Clérico (France) Paul Belmondo (France) Didier Defourny	Chrysler 8.0L V10	D	22
33 DNF	GT	28	(Germany) Wieth Racing	(Germany) Niko Wieth (Germany) Franz Wieth	Ferrari 550 Maranello	Y	5
33 DNF	GT	28	(Germany) Wieth Racing	(Germany) Niko Wieth (Germany) Franz Wieth	Ferrari 6.0L V12	Y	5
DNS	GT	14	(Italy) Autorlando Sport	(Italy) Marco Spinelli (Italy) Gabriele Sabatini	Porsche 911 GT2	P	–
DNS	GT	14	(Italy) Autorlando Sport	(Italy) Marco Spinelli (Italy) Gabriele Sabatini	Porsche 3.8L Turbo Flat-6	P	–
DNS	N-GT	64	(Czech Republic) Coca-Cola Racing Team	(Czech Republic) Milan Maderyč (Slovakia) Jirko Malchárek	Porsche 911 GT3-R	D	–
DNS	N-GT	64	(Czech Republic) Coca-Cola Racing Team	(Czech Republic) Milan Maderyč (Slovakia) Jirko Malchárek	Porsche 3.6L Flat-6	D	–

== Statistics ==
- Pole position – #7 Larbre Compétition Chereau – 1:43.570
- Fastest lap – #3 Carsport Holland – 1:36.751
- Average speed – 151.300 km/h

FIA GT Championship
Previous race: 2001 FIA GT Brno 500km	2001 season	Next race: 2001 FIA GT Silverstone 500km
