= 2001 FIA GT Monza 500km =

Layout of the Autodromo Nazionale Monza

The 2001 FIA GT Monza 500 km was the first round the 2001 FIA GT Championship season. It took place at the Autodromo Nazionale Monza, Italy, on March 31, 2001.

== Official results ==
Class winners in bold. Cars failing to complete 70% of winner's distance marked as Not Classified (NC).

Pos	Class	No	Team	Drivers	Chassis	Tyre	Laps
Pos	Class	No	Team	Drivers	Engine	Tyre	Laps
1	**GT**	**1**	**(United Kingdom) Lister Storm Racing**	**(United Kingdom) Jamie Campbell-Walter (Netherlands) Tom Coronel**	**Lister Storm**	MI	**87**
1	**GT**	**1**	**(United Kingdom) Lister Storm Racing**	**(United Kingdom) Jamie Campbell-Walter (Netherlands) Tom Coronel**	**Jaguar 7.0L V12**	MI	**87**
2	GT	7	(France) Larbre Compétition Chéreau	(France) Christophe Bouchut (France) Jean-Philippe Belloc	Chrysler Viper GTS-R	MI	87
2	GT	7	(France) Larbre Compétition Chéreau	(France) Christophe Bouchut (France) Jean-Philippe Belloc	Chrysler 8.0L V10	MI	87
3	GT	12	(France) Paul Belmondo Racing	(France) Boris Derichebourg (Belgium) Vincent Vosse	Chrysler Viper GTS-R	D	87
3	GT	12	(France) Paul Belmondo Racing	(France) Boris Derichebourg (Belgium) Vincent Vosse	Chrysler 8.0L V10	D	87
4	GT	11	(France) Paul Belmondo Racing	(France) Paul Belmondo (Belgium) Didier Defourny	Chrysler Viper GTS-R	D	86
4	GT	11	(France) Paul Belmondo Racing	(France) Paul Belmondo (Belgium) Didier Defourny	Chrysler 8.0L V10	D	86
5	GT	6	(Italy) Team Rafanelli	(Belgium) Marc Duez (Germany) Günther Blieninger	Ferrari 550 Maranello	MI	85
5	GT	6	(Italy) Team Rafanelli	(Belgium) Marc Duez (Germany) Günther Blieninger	Ferrari 6.0L V12	MI	85
6	GT	14	(Italy) Autorlando Sport	(Italy) Marco Spinelli (Italy) Fabio Villa (Italy) Gabriele Sabatini	Porsche 911 GT2	P	84
6	GT	14	(Italy) Autorlando Sport	(Italy) Marco Spinelli (Italy) Fabio Villa (Italy) Gabriele Sabatini	Porsche 3.8L Turbo Flat-6	P	84
7	**N-GT**	**69**	**(Italy) Autorlando Sport**	**(Venezuela) Johnny Cecotto (Austria) Philipp Peter**	**Porsche 911 GT3-RS**	P	**83**
7	**N-GT**	**69**	**(Italy) Autorlando Sport**	**(Venezuela) Johnny Cecotto (Austria) Philipp Peter**	**Porsche 3.6L Flat-6**	P	**83**
8	N-GT	77	(Germany) RWS Motorsport	(Italy) Luca Riccitelli (Austria) Dieter Quester	Porsche 911 GT3-RS	MI	83
8	N-GT	77	(Germany) RWS Motorsport	(Italy) Luca Riccitelli (Austria) Dieter Quester	Porsche 3.6L Flat-6	MI	83
9	N-GT	55	(France) Perspective Racing	(France) Thierry Perrier (Belgium) Michel Neugarten	Porsche 911 GT3-RS	D	83
9	N-GT	55	(France) Perspective Racing	(France) Thierry Perrier (Belgium) Michel Neugarten	Porsche 3.6L Flat-6	D	83
10	N-GT	54	(Italy) ART Engineering	(Italy) Fabio Babini (Italy) Luigi Moccia	Porsche 911 GT3-RS	P	83
10	N-GT	54	(Italy) ART Engineering	(Italy) Fabio Babini (Italy) Luigi Moccia	Porsche 3.6L Flat-6	P	83
11	N-GT	57	(Germany) Freisinger Motorsport	(Germany) Wolfgang Kaufmann (France) Stéphane Ortelli	Porsche 911 GT3-RS	Y	83
11	N-GT	57	(Germany) Freisinger Motorsport	(Germany) Wolfgang Kaufmann (France) Stéphane Ortelli	Porsche 3.6L Flat-6	Y	83
12	N-GT	50	(France) Larbre Compétition Chéreau	(France) Patrice Goueslard (France) Sébastien Dumez	Porsche 911 GT3-RS	MI	82
12	N-GT	50	(France) Larbre Compétition Chéreau	(France) Patrice Goueslard (France) Sébastien Dumez	Porsche 3.6L Flat-6	MI	82
13	N-GT	58	(Germany) Freisinger Motorsport	(Japan) Yukihiro Hane (United Kingdom) Nigel Smith	Porsche 911 GT3-R	Y	81
13	N-GT	58	(Germany) Freisinger Motorsport	(Japan) Yukihiro Hane (United Kingdom) Nigel Smith	Porsche 3.6L Flat-6	Y	81
14	N-GT	76	(Germany) RWS Motorsport	(Italy) Fabio Mancini (Italy) Gianni Collini	Porsche 911 GT3-R	MI	81
14	N-GT	76	(Germany) RWS Motorsport	(Italy) Fabio Mancini (Italy) Gianni Collini	Porsche 3.6L Flat-6	MI	81
15	N-GT	60	(Switzerland) Haberthur Racing	(France) Sylvain Noël (France) Laurent Cazenave	Porsche 911 GT3-R	D	80
15	N-GT	60	(Switzerland) Haberthur Racing	(France) Sylvain Noël (France) Laurent Cazenave	Porsche 3.6L Flat-6	D	80
16	N-GT	68	(Italy) MAC Racing	(Italy) Paolo Rapetti (Italy) Bepo Orlandi	Porsche 911 GT3-RS	D	80
16	N-GT	68	(Italy) MAC Racing	(Italy) Paolo Rapetti (Italy) Bepo Orlandi	Porsche 3.6L Flat-6	D	80
17	N-GT	64	(Czech Republic) Coca-Cola Racing Team	(Czech Republic) Josef Venc (Czech Republic) Robert Pergl (Czech Republic) Jaroslav Janiš	Porsche 911 GT3-R	D	79
17	N-GT	64	(Czech Republic) Coca-Cola Racing Team	(Czech Republic) Josef Venc (Czech Republic) Robert Pergl (Czech Republic) Jaroslav Janiš	Porsche 3.6L Flat-6	D	79
18	N-GT	67	(Italy) MAC Racing	(Italy) Maurizio Lusuardi (Italy) Raffale Sangiuolo	Porsche 911 GT3-R	D	79
18	N-GT	67	(Italy) MAC Racing	(Italy) Maurizio Lusuardi (Italy) Raffale Sangiuolo	Porsche 3.6L Flat-6	D	79
19	N-GT	59	(Germany) Freisinger Racing	(Russia) Alexey Vasilyev (Russia) Nikolai Fomenko	Porsche 911 GT3-R	Y	78
19	N-GT	59	(Germany) Freisinger Racing	(Russia) Alexey Vasilyev (Russia) Nikolai Fomenko	Porsche 3.6L Flat-6	Y	78
20 DNF	GT	10	(France) Paul Belmondo Competition	(France) Claude-Yves Gosselin (Belgium) Anthony Kumpen	Chrysler Viper GTS-R	D	80
20 DNF	GT	10	(France) Paul Belmondo Competition	(France) Claude-Yves Gosselin (Belgium) Anthony Kumpen	Chrysler 8.0L V10	D	80
21 DNF	GT	8	(Germany) Proton Competition	(Germany) Christian Ried (Italy) Luca Pazzaglia (Italy) Mauro Casadei	Porsche 911 GT2	Y	62
21 DNF	GT	8	(Germany) Proton Competition	(Germany) Christian Ried (Italy) Luca Pazzaglia (Italy) Mauro Casadei	Porsche 3.8L Turbo Flat-6	Y	62
22 DNF	N-GT	63	(France) JMB Competition	(Italy) Andrea Garbagnati (Italy) Marco Lambertini (Italy) Batti Pregliasco	Ferrari 360 Modena N-GT	MI	62
22 DNF	N-GT	63	(France) JMB Competition	(Italy) Andrea Garbagnati (Italy) Marco Lambertini (Italy) Batti Pregliasco	Ferrari 3.6L V8	MI	62
23 DNF	GT	5	(Italy) Team Rafanelli	(Italy) Emanuele Naspetti (Italy) Mimmo Schiattarella	Ferrari 550 Maranello	MI	61
23 DNF	GT	5	(Italy) Team Rafanelli	(Italy) Emanuele Naspetti (Italy) Mimmo Schiattarella	Ferrari 6.0L V12	MI	61
24 DNF	GT	9	(France) Team A.R.T.	(France) Jean-Pierre Jarier (France) François Lafon	Chrysler Viper GTS-R	D	54
24 DNF	GT	9	(France) Team A.R.T.	(France) Jean-Pierre Jarier (France) François Lafon	Chrysler 8.0L V10	D	54
25 DNF	N-GT	52	(United Kingdom) EMKA Racing	(United Kingdom) Tim Sugden (United Kingdom) Steve O'Rourke	Porsche 911 GT3-R	D	37
25 DNF	N-GT	52	(United Kingdom) EMKA Racing	(United Kingdom) Tim Sugden (United Kingdom) Steve O'Rourke	Porsche 3.6L Flat-6	D	37
26 DNF	N-GT	65	(Czech Republic) Coca-Cola Racing Team	(Czech Republic) Milan Maderyč (Slovakia) Jirko Malchárek	Porsche 911 GT3-RS	D	36
26 DNF	N-GT	65	(Czech Republic) Coca-Cola Racing Team	(Czech Republic) Milan Maderyč (Slovakia) Jirko Malchárek	Porsche 3.6L Flat-6	D	36
27 DNF	N-GT	61	(Switzerland) Haberthur Racing	(France) Patrick Vuillaume (Italy) Massimo Frigerio (Italy) Walter Meloni	Porsche 911 GT3-R	D	28
27 DNF	N-GT	61	(Switzerland) Haberthur Racing	(France) Patrick Vuillaume (Italy) Massimo Frigerio (Italy) Walter Meloni	Porsche 3.6L Flat-6	D	28
28 DNF	N-GT	62	(France) JMB Competition	(Italy) Christian Pescatori (France) David Terrien	Ferrari 360 Modena N-GT	MI	25
28 DNF	N-GT	62	(France) JMB Competition	(Italy) Christian Pescatori (France) David Terrien	Ferrari 3.6L V8	MI	25
29 DNF	N-GT	51	(France) Larbre Compétition Chéreau	(Germany) Jürgen van Gartzen (Switzerland) Bruno Eichmann	Porsche 911 GT3-RS	MI	10
29 DNF	N-GT	51	(France) Larbre Compétition Chéreau	(Germany) Jürgen van Gartzen (Switzerland) Bruno Eichmann	Porsche 3.6L Flat-6	MI	10
30 DNF	N-GT	53	(Italy) ART Engineering	(Italy) Alberto Radaelli (Italy) Andrea Bertolini	Porsche 911 GT3-R	P	10
30 DNF	N-GT	53	(Italy) ART Engineering	(Italy) Alberto Radaelli (Italy) Andrea Bertolini	Porsche 3.6L Flat-6	P	10
31 DNF	GT	2	(United Kingdom) Lister Storm Racing	(United Kingdom) Julian Bailey (Germany) Nicolaus Springer	Lister Storm	MI	0
31 DNF	GT	2	(United Kingdom) Lister Storm Racing	(United Kingdom) Julian Bailey (Germany) Nicolaus Springer	Jaguar 7.0L V12	MI	0
DNS	GT	3	(Netherlands) Team Carsport Holland	(Netherlands) Jeroen Bleekemolen (Netherlands) Mike Hezemans	Chrysler Viper GTS-R	MI	–
DNS	GT	3	(Netherlands) Team Carsport Holland	(Netherlands) Jeroen Bleekemolen (Netherlands) Mike Hezemans	Chrysler 8.0L V10	MI	–
DNS	GT	4	(Netherlands) Team Carsport Holland	(Netherlands) Michael Bleekemolen (Netherlands) Sebastiaan Bleekemolen	Chrysler Viper GTS-R	MI	–
DNS	GT	4	(Netherlands) Team Carsport Holland	(Netherlands) Michael Bleekemolen (Netherlands) Sebastiaan Bleekemolen	Chrysler 8.0L V10	MI	–
DNS	GT	21	(Belgium) GLPK Racing	(Belgium) Wim Daems (Hungary) Tamás Illés	Chrysler Viper GTS-R	D	–
DNS	GT	21	(Belgium) GLPK Racing	(Belgium) Wim Daems (Hungary) Tamás Illés	Chrysler 8.0L V10	D	–
DNS	GT	24	(Italy) Racing Box	(Italy) Luca Cappalleri (Italy) Gabriele Matteuzzi	Chrysler Viper GTS-R	D	–
DNS	GT	24	(Italy) Racing Box	(Italy) Luca Cappalleri (Italy) Gabriele Matteuzzi	Chrysler 8.0L V10	D	–

== Statistics ==
- Pole position – #7 Larbre Competition Chereau – 1:48.287
- Fastest lap – #1 Lister Storm Racing – 1:47.545
- Average speed – 148.420 km/h

FIA GT Championship
Previous race: None	2001 season	Next race: 2001 FIA GT Brno 500km
