= 2001 FIA GT Budapest 500km =

Layout of the Hungaroring (1989-2002)

The 2001 FIA GT Budapest 500 km was the sixth round the 2001 FIA GT Championship season. It took place at the Hungaroring, Hungary, on July 1, 2001.

== Official results ==
Class winners in bold. Cars failing to complete 70% of winner's distance marked as Not Classified (NC).

Pos	Class	No	Team	Drivers	Chassis	Tyre	Laps
Pos	Class	No	Team	Drivers	Engine	Tyre	Laps
1	**GT**	**3**	**(Netherlands) Team Carsport Holland**	**(Netherlands) Jeroen Bleekemolen (Netherlands) Mike Hezemans**	**Chrysler Viper GTS-R**	**MI**	**102**
1	**GT**	**3**	**(Netherlands) Team Carsport Holland**	**(Netherlands) Jeroen Bleekemolen (Netherlands) Mike Hezemans**	**Chrysler 8.0L V10**	**MI**	**102**
2	GT	7	(France) Larbre Compétition Chéreau	(France) Christophe Bouchut (France) Jean-Philippe Belloc	Chrysler Viper GTS-R	**MI**	102
2	GT	7	(France) Larbre Compétition Chéreau	(France) Christophe Bouchut (France) Jean-Philippe Belloc	Chrysler 8.0L V10	**MI**	102
3	GT	4	(Netherlands) Team Carsport Holland	(Netherlands) Michael Bleekemolen (Netherlands) Sebastiaan Bleekemolen	Chrysler Viper GTS-R	**MI**	101
3	GT	4	(Netherlands) Team Carsport Holland	(Netherlands) Michael Bleekemolen (Netherlands) Sebastiaan Bleekemolen	Chrysler 8.0L V10	**MI**	101
4	GT	2	(United Kingdom) Lister Storm Racing	(United Kingdom) Julian Bailey (Germany) Nicolaus Springer	Lister Storm	**MI**	101
4	GT	2	(United Kingdom) Lister Storm Racing	(United Kingdom) Julian Bailey (Germany) Nicolaus Springer	Jaguar 7.0L V12	**MI**	101
5	GT	12	(France) Paul Belmondo Racing	(France) Boris Derichebourg (Belgium) Vincent Vosse	Chrysler Viper GTS-R	**D**	101
5	GT	12	(France) Paul Belmondo Racing	(France) Boris Derichebourg (Belgium) Vincent Vosse	Chrysler 8.0L V10	**D**	101
6	GT	11	(France) Paul Belmondo Racing	(Belgium) Anthony Kumpen (France) Didier Defourny	Chrysler Viper GTS-R	**D**	101
6	GT	11	(France) Paul Belmondo Racing	(Belgium) Anthony Kumpen (France) Didier Defourny	Chrysler 8.0L V10	**D**	101
7	**N-GT**	**62**	**(France) JMB Competition**	**(Italy) Christian Pescatori (France) David Terrien**	**Ferrari 360 Modena N-GT**	**MI**	**100**
7	**N-GT**	**62**	**(France) JMB Competition**	**(Italy) Christian Pescatori (France) David Terrien**	**Ferrari 3.6L V8**	**MI**	**100**
8	N-GT	50	(France) Larbre Compétition Chéreau	(France) Patrice Goueslard (France) Sébastien Dumez	Porsche 911 GT3-RS	**MI**	100
8	N-GT	50	(France) Larbre Compétition Chéreau	(France) Patrice Goueslard (France) Sébastien Dumez	Porsche 3.6L Flat-6	**MI**	100
9	GT	9	(France) Team A.R.T.	(France) Jean-Pierre Jarier (France) François Lafon	Chrysler Viper GTS-R	**D**	100
9	GT	9	(France) Team A.R.T.	(France) Jean-Pierre Jarier (France) François Lafon	Chrysler 8.0L V10	**D**	100
10	N-GT	54	(Italy) ART Engineering	(Italy) Fabio Babini (Italy) Luigi Moccia	Porsche 911 GT3-RS	**P**	99
10	N-GT	54	(Italy) ART Engineering	(Italy) Fabio Babini (Italy) Luigi Moccia	Porsche 3.6L Flat-6	**P**	99
11	GT	24	(Italy) Racing Box	(Italy) Luca Cappellari (Italy) Gabriele Matteuzzi (France) Dominique Dupuy	Chrysler Viper GTS-R	**D**	99
11	GT	24	(Italy) Racing Box	(Italy) Luca Cappellari (Italy) Gabriele Matteuzzi (France) Dominique Dupuy	Chrysler 8.0L V10	**D**	99
12	GT	10	(France) Paul Belmondo Competition	(France) Claude-Yves Gosselin (France) Paul Belmondo	Chrysler Viper GTS-R	**D**	99
12	GT	10	(France) Paul Belmondo Competition	(France) Claude-Yves Gosselin (France) Paul Belmondo	Chrysler 8.0L V10	**D**	99
13	N-GT	55	(France) Perspective Racing	(France) Thierry Perrier (Belgium) Michel Neugarten	Porsche 911 GT3-RS	**D**	99
13	N-GT	55	(France) Perspective Racing	(France) Thierry Perrier (Belgium) Michel Neugarten	Porsche 3.6L Flat-6	**D**	99
14	N-GT	52	(United Kingdom) EMKA Racing	(United Kingdom) Tim Sugden (United Kingdom) Steve O'Rourke	Porsche 911 GT3-R	**D**	98
14	N-GT	52	(United Kingdom) EMKA Racing	(United Kingdom) Tim Sugden (United Kingdom) Steve O'Rourke	Porsche 3.6L Flat-6	**D**	98
15	N-GT	76	(Germany) RWS Motorsport	(Italy) Giovanni Gulinelli (Germany) Günther Blieninger (Spain) Antonio García	Porsche 911 GT3-R	**MI**	98
15	N-GT	76	(Germany) RWS Motorsport	(Italy) Giovanni Gulinelli (Germany) Günther Blieninger (Spain) Antonio García	Porsche 3.6L Flat-6	**MI**	98
16	N-GT	57	(Germany) Freisinger Motorsport	(Germany) Wolfgang Kaufmann (France) Stéphane Ortelli	Porsche 911 GT3-RS	**Y**	98
16	N-GT	57	(Germany) Freisinger Motorsport	(Germany) Wolfgang Kaufmann (France) Stéphane Ortelli	Porsche 3.6L Flat-6	**Y**	98
17	N-GT	53	(Italy) ART Engineering	(Slovakia) Jirko Malchárek (Italy) Andrea Bertolini	Porsche 911 GT3-R	**P**	96
17	N-GT	53	(Italy) ART Engineering	(Slovakia) Jirko Malchárek (Italy) Andrea Bertolini	Porsche 3.6L Flat-6	**P**	96
18	N-GT	77	(Germany) RWS Motorsport	(Italy) Luca Riccitelli (Germany) Jürgen von Gartzen	Porsche 911 GT3-RS	**MI**	96
18	N-GT	77	(Germany) RWS Motorsport	(Italy) Luca Riccitelli (Germany) Jürgen von Gartzen	Porsche 3.6L Flat-6	**MI**	96
19	N-GT	51	(France) Larbre Compétition Chéreau	(Germany) André Ahrlé (France) Jean-Luc Chéreau	Porsche 911 GT3-RS	**MI**	94
19	N-GT	51	(France) Larbre Compétition Chéreau	(Germany) André Ahrlé (France) Jean-Luc Chéreau	Porsche 3.6L Flat-6	**MI**	94
20	N-GT	66	(China) Gammon Megaspeed	(Hong Kong) Alex Li (Belgium) Geoffroy Horion	Porsche 911 GT3-R	**MI**	91
20	N-GT	66	(China) Gammon Megaspeed	(Hong Kong) Alex Li (Belgium) Geoffroy Horion	Porsche 3.6L Flat-6	**MI**	91
21	N-GT	63	(France) JMB Competition	(Italy) Andrea Garbagnati (Italy) Batti Pregliasco	Ferrari 360 Modena N-GT	**MI**	84
21	N-GT	63	(France) JMB Competition	(Italy) Andrea Garbagnati (Italy) Batti Pregliasco	Ferrari 3.6L V8	**MI**	84
22	N-GT	68	(Italy) MAC Racing	(Italy) Mario Sala (France) Stéphane Daoudi	Porsche 911 GT3-RS	**D**	71
22	N-GT	68	(Italy) MAC Racing	(Italy) Mario Sala (France) Stéphane Daoudi	Porsche 3.6L Flat-6	**D**	71
23 DNF	GT	21	(Belgium) GLPK Racing	(Belgium) Wim Daems (Hungary) Tamás Illés	Chrysler Viper GTS-R	**D**	95
23 DNF	GT	21	(Belgium) GLPK Racing	(Belgium) Wim Daems (Hungary) Tamás Illés	Chrysler 8.0L V10	**D**	95
24 DNF	N-GT	60	(Switzerland) Haberthur Racing	(France) Sylvain Noël (United Kingdom) Nigel Smith	Porsche 911 GT3-R	**D**	93
24 DNF	N-GT	60	(Switzerland) Haberthur Racing	(France) Sylvain Noël (United Kingdom) Nigel Smith	Porsche 3.6L Flat-6	**D**	93
25 DNF	N-GT	59	(Germany) Freisinger Racing	(Russia) Alexey Vasilyev (Russia) Nikolai Fomenko	Porsche 911 GT3-R	**Y**	67
25 DNF	N-GT	59	(Germany) Freisinger Racing	(Russia) Alexey Vasilyev (Russia) Nikolai Fomenko	Porsche 3.6L Flat-6	**Y**	67
26 DNF	GT	29	(Hungary) Bovi Racing	(Hungary) Attila Barta (Hungary) Ferenc Rátkai (Hungary) Kálmán Bódis	Porsche 911 GT2	?	64
26 DNF	GT	29	(Hungary) Bovi Racing	(Hungary) Attila Barta (Hungary) Ferenc Rátkai (Hungary) Kálmán Bódis	Porsche 3.6L Turbo Flat-6	?	64
27 DNF	N-GT	67	(Italy) MAC Racing	(Italy) Thomas Pichler (Italy) Raffaele Sangiuolo	Porsche 911 GT3-R	**D**	63
27 DNF	N-GT	67	(Italy) MAC Racing	(Italy) Thomas Pichler (Italy) Raffaele Sangiuolo	Porsche 3.6L Flat-6	**D**	63
28 DNF	N-GT	69	(Italy) Autorlando Sport	(Austria) Philipp Peter (Switzerland) Andrea Chiesa	Porsche 911 GT3-RS	**P**	60
28 DNF	N-GT	69	(Italy) Autorlando Sport	(Austria) Philipp Peter (Switzerland) Andrea Chiesa	Porsche 3.6L Flat-6	**P**	60
29 DNF	GT	19	(Germany) Reiter Engineering	(Germany) Michael Trunk (Germany) Bernhard Müller	Lamborghini Diablo GTR	**D**	50
29 DNF	GT	19	(Germany) Reiter Engineering	(Germany) Michael Trunk (Germany) Bernhard Müller	Lamborghini 6.0L V12	**D**	50
30 DNF	GT	8	(Germany) Proton Competition	(Germany) Gerold Ried (Austria) Horst Felbermayr, Sr. (Austria) Horst Felbermayr, Jr.	Porsche 911 GT2	**Y**	28
30 DNF	GT	8	(Germany) Proton Competition	(Germany) Gerold Ried (Austria) Horst Felbermayr, Sr. (Austria) Horst Felbermayr, Jr.	Porsche 3.8L Turbo Flat-6	**Y**	28
31 DNF	GT	1	(United Kingdom) Lister Storm Racing	(United Kingdom) Jamie Campbell-Walter (Netherlands) Tom Coronel	Lister Storm	**MI**	20
31 DNF	GT	1	(United Kingdom) Lister Storm Racing	(United Kingdom) Jamie Campbell-Walter (Netherlands) Tom Coronel	Jaguar 7.0L V12	**MI**	20
32 DNF	N-GT	61	(Switzerland) Haberthur Racing	(Italy) Mauro Casadei (Italy) Stefano Zonca	Porsche 911 GT3-R	**D**	18
32 DNF	N-GT	61	(Switzerland) Haberthur Racing	(Italy) Mauro Casadei (Italy) Stefano Zonca	Porsche 3.6L Flat-6	**D**	18
33 DNF	GT	15	(United Kingdom) Prodrive All-Stars	(Sweden) Rickard Rydell (Switzerland) Alain Menu	Ferrari 550-GTS Maranello	**D**	17
33 DNF	GT	15	(United Kingdom) Prodrive All-Stars	(Sweden) Rickard Rydell (Switzerland) Alain Menu	Ferrari 5.9L V12	**D**	17
34 DNF	GT	28	(Germany) Wieth Racing	(Germany) Niko Wieth (Germany) Franz Wieth	Ferrari 550 Maranello	**Y**	9
34 DNF	GT	28	(Germany) Wieth Racing	(Germany) Niko Wieth (Germany) Franz Wieth	Ferrari 6.0L V12	**Y**	9

== Statistics ==
- Pole position – #3 Team Carsport Holland – 1:38.186
- Fastest lap – #2 Lister Storm Racing – 1:39.068
- Average speed – 134.170 km/h

FIA GT Championship
Previous race: 2001 FIA GT Zolder 500km	2001 season	Next race: 2001 Spa 24 Hours
