= 2001 FIA GT Championship =

Motorsport season

Seasons
- ← 2000 2002 →

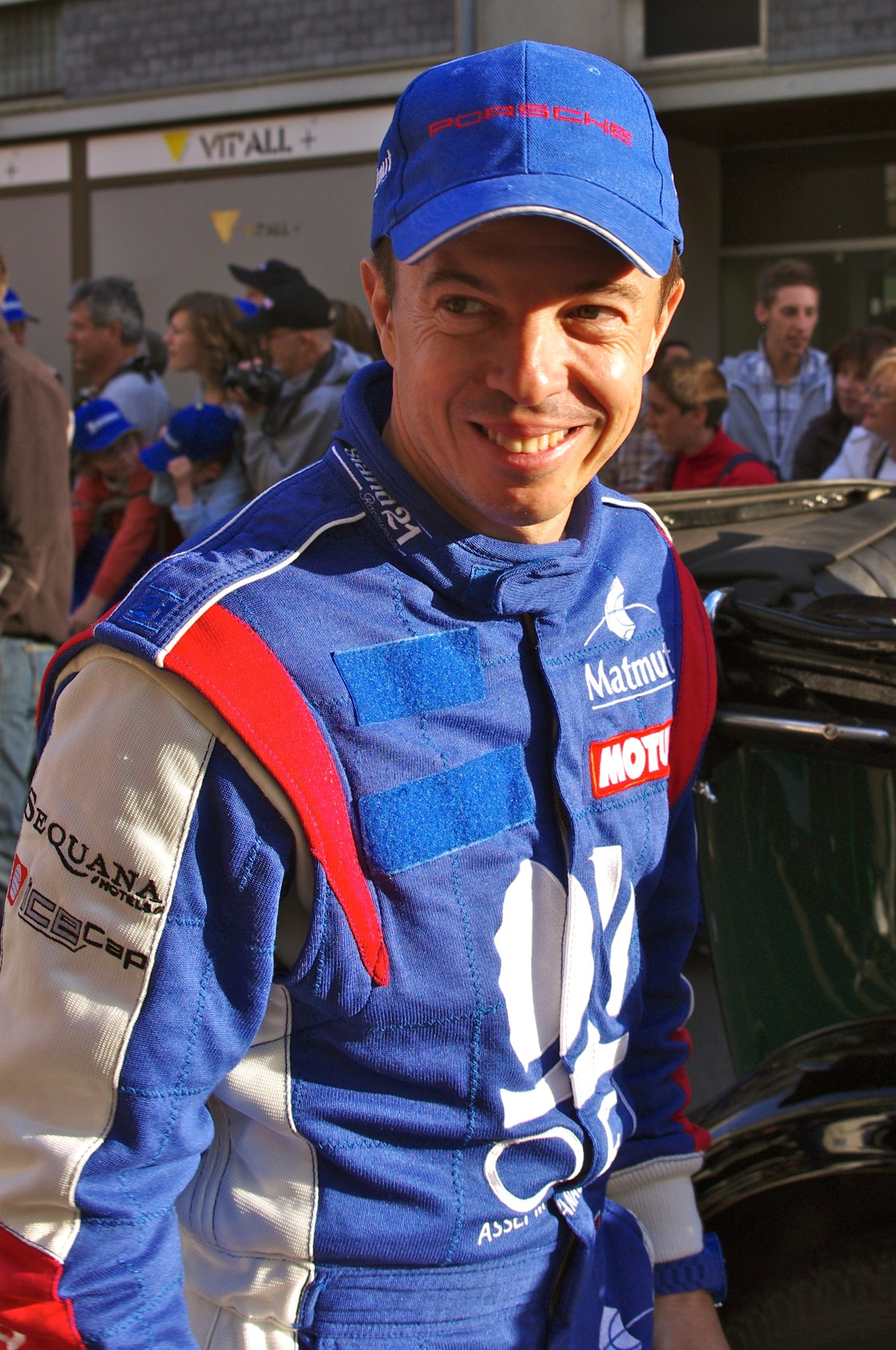
2001 FIA GT Drivers' Co-champion Jean-Philippe Belloc

The 2001 FIA GT Championship was the fifth season of FIA GT Championship, an auto racing series endorsed by the Fédération Internationale de l'Automobile (FIA) and organized by the Stéphane Ratel Organisation (SRO). The races featured grand touring cars divided into two categories and awarded drivers and teams championships and cups for each category. The season began on 31 March 2001 and ended on 21 October 2001 after eleven races held in Europe, and included for the first time the Spa 24 Hours as a premiere endurance event for the series.

Christophe Bouchut and Jean-Philippe Belloc of France won the FIA GT Drivers' Championship, while their team Larbre Compétition-Chereau were the teams champions, both earning five race victories including at Spa. David Terrien and Christian Pescatori of JMB Competition won the N-GT Cups after six race wins.

== Schedule ==
The SRO Group reached an agreement with Eurosport, the promoter and broadcaster of the European Touring Car Championship, in which both series would share identical calendars. The events were promoted by Eurosport as the Super Racing Weekend, giving both series equal promotion and television coverage. The Formula Renault 2000 Eurocup was also included as a support series for all events. The only exception to this format would be the Spa 24 Hours, added to the FIA GT calendar as a stand-alone event, separate from the ETCC, after formerly holding touring car races for several decades. The addition of Spa marked the return of endurance racing to the championship for the first time since 1998 and expanded the calendar from ten to eleven events. Much of the rest of the schedule remained the same, although some races were moved to different times of the year. Monza returned to the opening of the season, as it had been in 1999, and Brno and Magny-Cours moved from the end of the season to the second and third rounds respectively. This moved the Spanish and Portuguese events to the end of the year, with Jarama replacing Valencia for the Spanish event. The Nürburgring also returned to the series for the first time since 1997 as the sole German event, replacing EuroSpeedway Lausitz. All events, with the exception of Spa, retained their 500 km (310 mi) distance format.

Rnd	Race	Circuit	Date
1	Eurosport Super Racing Weekend Monza	Autodromo Nazionale Monza, Monza, Italy	31 March
2	BVV-Autosalon Brno Super Racing Weekend	Autodrom Brno Masaryk, Brno, Czech Republic	16 April
3	Eurosport Super Racing Weekend Magny-Cours	Circuit de Nevers Magny-Cours, Magny-Cours, France	1 May
4	Eurosport Super Racing Weekend Silverstone	Silverstone Circuit, Silverstone, United Kingdom	13 May
5	Eurosport Super Racing Weekend Zolder	Circuit Zolder, Zolder, Belgium	20 May
6	Eurosport Super Racing Weekend Hungaroring	Hungaroring, Mogyoród, Hungary	1 July
7	Proximus 24 Spa	Circuit de Spa-Francorchamps, Stavelot, Belgium	4–5 August
8	Eurosport Super Racing Weekend A1-Ring	A1-Ring, Spielberg, Austria	26 August
9	Eurosport Super Racing Weekend Nürburgring	Nürburgring, Nürburg, Germany	9 September
10	Eurosport Super Racing Weekend Jarama	Circuito Permanente Del Jarama, San Sebastián de los Reyes, Spain	30 September
11	Eurosport Super Racing Weekend Estoril	Autódromo do Estoril, Estoril, Portugal	21 October

== Entries ==
=== GT ===
Entrant	Car	Engine	Tyre	No.	Drivers	Rounds
(United Kingdom) Lister Storm Racing	Lister Storm GTM	Jaguar 7.0 L V12	M	1	(United Kingdom) Jamie Campbell-Walter	1–6, 8–11
(United Kingdom) Lister Storm Racing	Lister Storm GTM	Jaguar 7.0 L V12	M	1	(Netherlands) Tom Coronel	1, 3–6, 8
(United Kingdom) Lister Storm Racing	Lister Storm GTM	Jaguar 7.0 L V12	M	1	(United Kingdom) Richard Dean	2
(United Kingdom) Lister Storm Racing	Lister Storm GTM	Jaguar 7.0 L V12	M	1	(United Kingdom) Mike Jordan	9
(United Kingdom) Lister Storm Racing	Lister Storm GTM	Jaguar 7.0 L V12	M	1	(United Kingdom) Bobby Verdon-Roe	10–11
(United Kingdom) Lister Storm Racing	Lister Storm GTM	Jaguar 7.0 L V12	M	2	(Germany) Nicolaus Springer	1–6, 8–11
(United Kingdom) Lister Storm Racing	Lister Storm GTM	Jaguar 7.0 L V12	M	2	(United Kingdom) Julian Bailey	1–6, 8–11
(United Kingdom) Lister Storm Racing	Lister Storm GTM	Jaguar 7.0 L V12	M	2	(United Kingdom) David Warnock	4
(Netherlands) Team Carsport Holland	Chrysler Viper GTS-R	Chrysler 356-T6 8.0 L V10	M	3	(Netherlands) Mike Hezemans	All
(Netherlands) Team Carsport Holland	Chrysler Viper GTS-R	Chrysler 356-T6 8.0 L V10	M	3	(Netherlands) Jeroen Bleekemolen	All
(Netherlands) Team Carsport Holland	Chrysler Viper GTS-R	Chrysler 356-T6 8.0 L V10	M	3	(Belgium) Thierry Tassin	7
(Netherlands) Team Carsport Holland	Chrysler Viper GTS-R	Chrysler 356-T6 8.0 L V10	M	4	(Netherlands) Michael Bleekemolen	All
(Netherlands) Team Carsport Holland	Chrysler Viper GTS-R	Chrysler 356-T6 8.0 L V10	M	4	(Netherlands) Sebastiaan Bleekemolen	All
(Netherlands) Team Carsport Holland	Chrysler Viper GTS-R	Chrysler 356-T6 8.0 L V10	M	4	(Belgium) Jean-Michel Martin	7
(Italy) Team Rafanelli	Ferrari 550 Millennio	Ferrari F133 6.0 L V12	M	5	(Italy) Emanuele Naspetti	1–5, 7–8
(Italy) Team Rafanelli	Ferrari 550 Millennio	Ferrari F133 6.0 L V12	M	5	(Italy) Mimmo Schiattarella	1–5
(Italy) Team Rafanelli	Ferrari 550 Millennio	Ferrari F133 6.0 L V12	M	5	(Belgium) Philippe Steveny	7
(Italy) Team Rafanelli	Ferrari 550 Millennio	Ferrari F133 6.0 L V12	M	5	(Belgium) Eric van de Poele	7
(Italy) Team Rafanelli	Ferrari 550 Millennio	Ferrari F133 6.0 L V12	M	5	(Belgium) Martial Chouvel	7
(Italy) Team Rafanelli	Ferrari 550 Millennio	Ferrari F133 6.0 L V12	M	5	(Belgium) Marc Duez	8
(Italy) Team Rafanelli	Ferrari 550 Millennio	Ferrari F133 6.0 L V12	M	6	(Belgium) Marc Duez	1–5
(Italy) Team Rafanelli	Ferrari 550 Millennio	Ferrari F133 6.0 L V12	M	6	(Germany) Günther Blieninger	1–5
(France) Larbre Compétition-Chereau	Chrysler Viper GTS-R	Chrysler 356-T6 8.0 L V10	M	7	(France) Christophe Bouchut	All
(France) Larbre Compétition-Chereau	Chrysler Viper GTS-R	Chrysler 356-T6 8.0 L V10	M	7	(France) Jean-Philippe Belloc	All
(France) Larbre Compétition-Chereau	Chrysler Viper GTS-R	Chrysler 356-T6 8.0 L V10	M	7	(Belgium) Marc Duez	7
(France) Larbre Compétition-Chereau	Chrysler Viper GTS-R	Chrysler 356-T6 8.0 L V10	M	7	(Portugal) Tiago Monteiro	11
(France) Larbre Compétition-Chereau	Chrysler Viper GTS-R	Chrysler 356-T6 8.0 L V10	M	17	(France) Sébastien Bourdais	7, 11
(France) Larbre Compétition-Chereau	Chrysler Viper GTS-R	Chrysler 356-T6 8.0 L V10	M	17	(France) Patrice Goueslard	7
(France) Larbre Compétition-Chereau	Chrysler Viper GTS-R	Chrysler 356-T6 8.0 L V10	M	17	(France) Sébastien Dumez	7
(France) Larbre Compétition-Chereau	Chrysler Viper GTS-R	Chrysler 356-T6 8.0 L V10	M	17	(France) Jean-Luc Chéreau	11
(France) Larbre Compétition-Chereau	Chrysler Viper GTS-R	Chrysler 356-T6 8.0 L V10	M	17	(Belgium) Marc Duez	11
(Germany) Proton Competition	Porsche 911 GT2	Porsche 3.6 L Turbo Flat-6	Y	8	(Germany) Christian Ried	1–6, 8–11
(Germany) Proton Competition	Porsche 911 GT2	Porsche 3.6 L Turbo Flat-6	Y	8	(Italy) Luca Pazzaglia	1, 3
(Germany) Proton Competition	Porsche 911 GT2	Porsche 3.6 L Turbo Flat-6	Y	8	(Italy) Mauro Casadei	1
(Germany) Proton Competition	Porsche 911 GT2	Porsche 3.6 L Turbo Flat-6	Y	8	(Germany) Gerold Ried	2–5, 9–11
(Germany) Proton Competition	Porsche 911 GT2	Porsche 3.6 L Turbo Flat-6	Y	8	(Austria) Horst Felbermayr	6, 8
(Germany) Proton Competition	Porsche 911 GT2	Porsche 3.6 L Turbo Flat-6	Y	8	(Austria) Horst Felbermayr Jr.	6, 8
(Germany) Proton Competition	Porsche 911 GT2	Porsche 3.6 L Turbo Flat-6	Y	30	(Austria) Horst Felbermayr	10–11
(Germany) Proton Competition	Porsche 911 GT2	Porsche 3.6 L Turbo Flat-6	Y	30	(Austria) Horst Felbermayr Jr.	10–11
(France) Team ART	Chrysler Viper GTS-R	Chrysler 356-T6 8.0 L V10	D	9	(France) Jean-Pierre Jarier	1–6, 9–11
(France) Team ART	Chrysler Viper GTS-R	Chrysler 356-T6 8.0 L V10	D	9	(France) François Lafon	1–6, 9–11
(France) Team ART	Lister Storm GTM	Jaguar 7.0 L V12	D	39	(France) Jean-Pierre Jarier	8
(France) Team ART	Lister Storm GTM	Jaguar 7.0 L V12	D	39	(France) François Lafon	8
(France) Paul Belmondo Competition	Chrysler Viper GTS-R	Chrysler 356-T6 8.0 L V10	D	10	(France) Claude-Yves Gosselin	1, 3–7, 10–11
(France) Paul Belmondo Competition	Chrysler Viper GTS-R	Chrysler 356-T6 8.0 L V10	D	10	(Belgium) Anthony Kumpen	1, 3–4, 7
(France) Paul Belmondo Competition	Chrysler Viper GTS-R	Chrysler 356-T6 8.0 L V10	D	10	(France) Paul Belmondo	2, 5–7, 10
(France) Paul Belmondo Competition	Chrysler Viper GTS-R	Chrysler 356-T6 8.0 L V10	D	10	(Belgium) Didier Defourny	2
(France) Paul Belmondo Competition	Chrysler Viper GTS-R	Chrysler 356-T6 8.0 L V10	D	10	(France) Luis Marques	11
(France) Paul Belmondo Racing	Chrysler Viper GTS-R	Chrysler 356-T6 8.0 L V10	D	11	(Belgium) Didier Defourny	1, 3–7
(France) Paul Belmondo Racing	Chrysler Viper GTS-R	Chrysler 356-T6 8.0 L V10	D	11	(France) Paul Belmondo	1, 3, 8–9, 11
(France) Paul Belmondo Racing	Chrysler Viper GTS-R	Chrysler 356-T6 8.0 L V10	D	11	(France) Emmanuel Clérico	2–4, 10
(France) Paul Belmondo Racing	Chrysler Viper GTS-R	Chrysler 356-T6 8.0 L V10	D	11	(Belgium) Anthony Kumpen	2, 5–6, 8–11
(France) Paul Belmondo Racing	Chrysler Viper GTS-R	Chrysler 356-T6 8.0 L V10	D	11	(France) Boris Derichebourg	7
(France) Paul Belmondo Racing	Chrysler Viper GTS-R	Chrysler 356-T6 8.0 L V10	D	11	(Belgium) Frédéric Bouvy	7
(France) Paul Belmondo Racing	Chrysler Viper GTS-R	Chrysler 356-T6 8.0 L V10	D	11	(France) Claude-Yves Gosselin	8–9
(France) Paul Belmondo Racing	Chrysler Viper GTS-R	Chrysler 356-T6 8.0 L V10	D	12	(Belgium) Vincent Vosse	All
(France) Paul Belmondo Racing	Chrysler Viper GTS-R	Chrysler 356-T6 8.0 L V10	D	12	(France) Boris Derichebourg	1–6, 8–11
(France) Paul Belmondo Racing	Chrysler Viper GTS-R	Chrysler 356-T6 8.0 L V10	D	12	(France) Emmanuel Clérico	7
(France) Paul Belmondo Racing	Chrysler Viper GTS-R	Chrysler 356-T6 8.0 L V10	D	12	(France) Éric Hélary	7
(Italy) Autorlando Sport	Porsche 911 GT2	Porsche 3.8 L Turbo Flat-6	P	14	(Italy) Gabriele Sabatini	1–3, 8–11
(Italy) Autorlando Sport	Porsche 911 GT2	Porsche 3.8 L Turbo Flat-6	P	14	(Italy) Marco Spinelli	1–3, 9–11
(Italy) Autorlando Sport	Porsche 911 GT2	Porsche 3.8 L Turbo Flat-6	P	14	(Italy) Fabio Villa	1
(Italy) Autorlando Sport	Porsche 911 GT2	Porsche 3.8 L Turbo Flat-6	P	14	(Italy) Mauro Casadei	2
(Italy) Autorlando Sport	Porsche 911 GT2	Porsche 3.8 L Turbo Flat-6	P	14	(Italy) Emanuele Moncini	8
(Italy) Autorlando Sport	Porsche 911 GT2	Porsche 3.8 L Turbo Flat-6	P	14	(Italy) Luciano Linossi	8
(Italy) Autorlando Sport	Porsche 911 GT2	Porsche 3.8 L Turbo Flat-6	P	14	(Italy) Raffaele Sangiuolo	9
(United Kingdom) Prodrive Allstars	Ferrari 550-GTS Maranello	Ferrari F133 5.9 L V12	D	15	(Sweden) Rickard Rydell	6, 8–11
(United Kingdom) Prodrive Allstars	Ferrari 550-GTS Maranello	Ferrari F133 5.9 L V12	D	15	(Switzerland) Alain Menu	6, 10–11
(United Kingdom) Prodrive Allstars	Ferrari 550-GTS Maranello	Ferrari F133 5.9 L V12	D	15	(Netherlands) Peter Kox	8–9
(Belgium) PSI Motorsport Team	Porsche 911 Bi-Turbo	Porsche 3.6 L Turbo Flat-6	D	18	(Belgium) Kurt Mollekens	5, 7, 9–10
(Belgium) PSI Motorsport Team	Porsche 911 Bi-Turbo	Porsche 3.6 L Turbo Flat-6	D	18	(Belgium) Stéphane Cohen	5, 7, 9–10
(Belgium) PSI Motorsport Team	Porsche 911 Bi-Turbo	Porsche 3.6 L Turbo Flat-6	D	18	(Belgium) Eric Geboers	7
(Germany) Reiter Engineering	Lamborghini Diablo GTR	Lamborghini 6.0 L V12	D	19	(Germany) Michael Trunk	5–6, 8–9
(Germany) Reiter Engineering	Lamborghini Diablo GTR	Lamborghini 6.0 L V12	D	19	(Germany) Bernhard Müller	5–6, 8–9
(Germany) Reiter Engineering	Lamborghini Diablo GTR	Lamborghini 6.0 L V12	D	19	(United Kingdom) Oliver Gavin	11
(Germany) Reiter Engineering	Lamborghini Diablo GTR	Lamborghini 6.0 L V12	D	19	(Netherlands) Peter Kox	11
(Belgium) GLPK Racing	Chrysler Viper GTS-R	Chrysler 356-T6 8.0 L V10	D	21	(Belgium) Wim Daems	1–7, 9–11
(Belgium) GLPK Racing	Chrysler Viper GTS-R	Chrysler 356-T6 8.0 L V10	D	21	(Hungary) Tamás Illés	1–6
(Belgium) GLPK Racing	Chrysler Viper GTS-R	Chrysler 356-T6 8.0 L V10	D	21	(Germany) Georg Severich	7, 9
(Belgium) GLPK Racing	Chrysler Viper GTS-R	Chrysler 356-T6 8.0 L V10	D	21	(Belgium) Bert Longin	7, 11
(Belgium) GLPK Racing	Chrysler Viper GTS-R	Chrysler 356-T6 8.0 L V10	D	21	(Belgium) Eric Geboers	10
(Italy) Racing Box	Chrysler Viper GTS-R	Chrysler 356-T6 8.0 L V10	D	24	(Italy) Luca Cappellari	1–6, 8–11
(Italy) Racing Box	Chrysler Viper GTS-R	Chrysler 356-T6 8.0 L V10	D	24	(Italy) Gabrielle Matteuzzi	1–6, 8–10
(Italy) Racing Box	Chrysler Viper GTS-R	Chrysler 356-T6 8.0 L V10	D	24	(France) Dominique Dupuy	6
(Italy) Racing Box	Chrysler Viper GTS-R	Chrysler 356-T6 8.0 L V10	D	24	(Italy) Stefano Zonca	9–10
(Italy) Racing Box	Chrysler Viper GTS-R	Chrysler 356-T6 8.0 L V10	D	24	(Italy) Emanuele Naspetti	11
(Belgium) Silver Racing	Chrysler Viper GTS-R	Chrysler 356-T6 8.0 L V10	D	25 (Note: Silver Racing ran Round 7 as car No. 26)	(Belgium) Robert Dierick	2–3, 5, 7
(Belgium) Silver Racing	Chrysler Viper GTS-R	Chrysler 356-T6 8.0 L V10	D	25	(Belgium) Eric De Doncker	2–3, 5, 7
(Belgium) Silver Racing	Chrysler Viper GTS-R	Chrysler 356-T6 8.0 L V10	D	25	(Belgium) Vincent Dupont	7
(Germany) Wieth Racing	Ferrari 550 GTS	Ferrari F133 6.0 L V12	Y	28	(Germany) Niko Wieth	2–3, 6, 9
(Germany) Wieth Racing	Ferrari 550 GTS	Ferrari F133 6.0 L V12	Y	28	(Germany) Franz Wieth	2–3, 6, 9
(Hungary) Bovi Racing	Porsche 911 GT2	Porsche 3.6 L Turbo Flat-6		29	(Hungary) Attila Barta	6
(Hungary) Bovi Racing	Porsche 911 GT2	Porsche 3.6 L Turbo Flat-6		29	(Hungary) Ferenc Rátkai	6
(Hungary) Bovi Racing	Porsche 911 GT2	Porsche 3.6 L Turbo Flat-6		29	(Hungary) Kálmán Bódis	6

=== N-GT ===
Entrant	Car	Engine	Tyre	No.	Drivers	Rounds
(France) Larbre Compétition-Chereau	Porsche 911 GT3-RS	Porsche 3.6 L Flat-6	M	50	(France) Sébastien Dumez	1–6, 8–11
(France) Larbre Compétition-Chereau	Porsche 911 GT3-RS	Porsche 3.6 L Flat-6	M	50	(France) Patrice Goueslard	1–6, 8, 10–11
(France) Larbre Compétition-Chereau	Porsche 911 GT3-RS	Porsche 3.6 L Flat-6	M	50	(France) Jean-Luc Chéreau	3
(France) Larbre Compétition-Chereau	Porsche 911 GT3-RS	Porsche 3.6 L Flat-6	M	50	(Germany) André Ahrlé	9
(France) Larbre Compétition-Chereau	Porsche 911 GT3-RS	Porsche 3.6 L Flat-6	M	51	(Germany) Jürgen van Gartzen	1–4
(France) Larbre Compétition-Chereau	Porsche 911 GT3-RS	Porsche 3.6 L Flat-6	M	51	(Switzerland) Bruno Eichmann	1–4
(France) Larbre Compétition-Chereau	Porsche 911 GT3-RS	Porsche 3.6 L Flat-6	M	51	(Germany) André Ahrlé	6
(France) Larbre Compétition-Chereau	Porsche 911 GT3-RS	Porsche 3.6 L Flat-6	M	51	(France) Jean-Luc Chéreau	6
(United Kingdom) EMKA Racing	Porsche 911 GT3-R	Porsche 3.6 L Flat-6	D	52	(United Kingdom) Steve O'Rourke	1–6, 8–11
(United Kingdom) EMKA Racing	Porsche 911 GT3-R	Porsche 3.6 L Flat-6	D	52	(United Kingdom) Tim Sugden	1–6, 8–11
(Italy) ART Engineering	Porsche 911 GT3-R; Porsche 911 GT3-RS	Porsche 3.6 L Flat-6	P	53	(Italy) Andrea Bertolini	1–6, 8–11
(Italy) ART Engineering	Porsche 911 GT3-R; Porsche 911 GT3-RS	Porsche 3.6 L Flat-6	P	53	(Italy) Alberto Radaelli	1–5
(Italy) ART Engineering	Porsche 911 GT3-R; Porsche 911 GT3-RS	Porsche 3.6 L Flat-6	P	53	(Slovakia) Jirko Malchárek	6, 8–9
(Italy) ART Engineering	Porsche 911 GT3-R; Porsche 911 GT3-RS	Porsche 3.6 L Flat-6	P	53	(France) Laurent Cazenave	10
(Italy) ART Engineering	Porsche 911 GT3-R; Porsche 911 GT3-RS	Porsche 3.6 L Flat-6	P	53	(United Kingdom) Paul Knapfield	11
(Italy) ART Engineering	Porsche 911 GT3-R; Porsche 911 GT3-RS	Porsche 3.6 L Flat-6	P	54	(Italy) Fabio Babini	All
(Italy) ART Engineering	Porsche 911 GT3-R; Porsche 911 GT3-RS	Porsche 3.6 L Flat-6	P	54	(Italy) Luigi Moccia	1–6, 8–10
(Italy) ART Engineering	Porsche 911 GT3-R; Porsche 911 GT3-RS	Porsche 3.6 L Flat-6	P	54	(Italy) Gianni Collini	7
(Italy) ART Engineering	Porsche 911 GT3-R; Porsche 911 GT3-RS	Porsche 3.6 L Flat-6	P	54	(Austria) Philipp Peter	7
(Italy) ART Engineering	Porsche 911 GT3-R; Porsche 911 GT3-RS	Porsche 3.6 L Flat-6	P	54	(Slovakia) Jirko Malchárek	7
(Italy) ART Engineering	Porsche 911 GT3-R; Porsche 911 GT3-RS	Porsche 3.6 L Flat-6	P	54	(United Kingdom) Nigel Smith	11
(France) Perspective Racing	Porsche 911 GT3-RS	Porsche 3.6 L Flat-6	D	55	(France) Thierry Perrier	All
(France) Perspective Racing	Porsche 911 GT3-RS	Porsche 3.6 L Flat-6	D	55	(Belgium) Michel Neugarten	All
(France) Perspective Racing	Porsche 911 GT3-RS	Porsche 3.6 L Flat-6	D	55	(Belgium) Kurt Thiers	7
(Germany) Freisinger Motorsport	Porsche 911 GT3-R; Porsche 911 GT3-RS	Porsche 3.6 L Flat-6	Y	57	(Germany) Wolfgang Kaufmann	1–6
(Germany) Freisinger Motorsport	Porsche 911 GT3-R; Porsche 911 GT3-RS	Porsche 3.6 L Flat-6	Y	57	(Monaco) Stéphane Ortelli	1–3, 5–9, 11
(Germany) Freisinger Motorsport	Porsche 911 GT3-R; Porsche 911 GT3-RS	Porsche 3.6 L Flat-6	Y	57	(France) Xavier Pompidou	4
(Germany) Freisinger Motorsport	Porsche 911 GT3-R; Porsche 911 GT3-RS	Porsche 3.6 L Flat-6	Y	57	(France) Cyrille Sauvage	7, 10
(Germany) Freisinger Motorsport	Porsche 911 GT3-R; Porsche 911 GT3-RS	Porsche 3.6 L Flat-6	Y	57	(Switzerland) Andrea Chiesa	7
(Germany) Freisinger Motorsport	Porsche 911 GT3-R; Porsche 911 GT3-RS	Porsche 3.6 L Flat-6	Y	57	(Portugal) Ni Amorim	8
(Germany) Freisinger Motorsport	Porsche 911 GT3-R; Porsche 911 GT3-RS	Porsche 3.6 L Flat-6	Y	57	(United Kingdom) Robin Liddell	9–10
(Germany) Freisinger Motorsport	Porsche 911 GT3-R; Porsche 911 GT3-RS	Porsche 3.6 L Flat-6	Y	57	(France) Romain Dumas	11
(Germany) Freisinger Motorsport	Porsche 911 GT3-R; Porsche 911 GT3-RS	Porsche 3.6 L Flat-6	Y	58	(Japan) Yukihiro Hane	1–5
(Germany) Freisinger Motorsport	Porsche 911 GT3-R; Porsche 911 GT3-RS	Porsche 3.6 L Flat-6	Y	58	(United Kingdom) Nigel Smith	1–4
(Germany) Freisinger Motorsport	Porsche 911 GT3-R; Porsche 911 GT3-RS	Porsche 3.6 L Flat-6	Y	58	(Belgium) Tim Verbergt	5, 7
(Germany) Freisinger Motorsport	Porsche 911 GT3-R; Porsche 911 GT3-RS	Porsche 3.6 L Flat-6	Y	58	(France) Xavier Pompidou	7, 9
(Germany) Freisinger Motorsport	Porsche 911 GT3-R; Porsche 911 GT3-RS	Porsche 3.6 L Flat-6	Y	58	(Belgium) Vanina Ickx	7
(Germany) Freisinger Motorsport	Porsche 911 GT3-R; Porsche 911 GT3-RS	Porsche 3.6 L Flat-6	Y	58	(France) Christophe Tinseau	7
(Germany) Freisinger Motorsport	Porsche 911 GT3-R; Porsche 911 GT3-RS	Porsche 3.6 L Flat-6	Y	58	(Austria) Toto Wolff	8
(Germany) Freisinger Motorsport	Porsche 911 GT3-R; Porsche 911 GT3-RS	Porsche 3.6 L Flat-6	Y	58	(Austria) Olivier Tichy	8
(Germany) Freisinger Motorsport	Porsche 911 GT3-R; Porsche 911 GT3-RS	Porsche 3.6 L Flat-6	Y	58	(United Kingdom) Paul Knapfield	9
(Germany) Freisinger Motorsport	Porsche 911 GT3-R; Porsche 911 GT3-RS	Porsche 3.6 L Flat-6	Y	58	(France) Angelo Lembo	11
(Germany) Freisinger Motorsport	Porsche 911 GT3-R; Porsche 911 GT3-RS	Porsche 3.6 L Flat-6	Y	58	(France) Marco Saviozzi	11
(Germany) Freisinger Motorsport	Porsche 911 GT3-R; Porsche 911 GT3-RS	Porsche 3.6 L Flat-6	Y	58	(France) Emmanuel Delalande	11
(Germany) Freisinger Racing	Porsche 911 GT3-R; Porsche 911 GT3-RS	Porsche 3.6 L Flat-6	Y	59	(Russia) Aleksey Vasilyev	1–6, 8–11
(Germany) Freisinger Racing	Porsche 911 GT3-R; Porsche 911 GT3-RS	Porsche 3.6 L Flat-6	Y	59	(Russia) Nikolai Fomenko	1–6, 8–11
(Germany) Freisinger Racing	Porsche 911 GT3-R; Porsche 911 GT3-RS	Porsche 3.6 L Flat-6	Y	59	(United Kingdom) Richard Kaye	2–3
(Germany) Freisinger Racing	Porsche 911 GT3-R; Porsche 911 GT3-RS	Porsche 3.6 L Flat-6	Y	59	(France) Thierry Depoix	7
(Germany) Freisinger Racing	Porsche 911 GT3-R; Porsche 911 GT3-RS	Porsche 3.6 L Flat-6	Y	59	(France) Philippe Haezebrouck	7
(Germany) Freisinger Racing	Porsche 911 GT3-R; Porsche 911 GT3-RS	Porsche 3.6 L Flat-6	Y	59	(Switzerland) Toni Seiler	7
(Germany) Freisinger Racing	Porsche 911 GT3-R; Porsche 911 GT3-RS	Porsche 3.6 L Flat-6	Y	71	(United Kingdom) Tim Lawrence	11
(Germany) Freisinger Racing	Porsche 911 GT3-R; Porsche 911 GT3-RS	Porsche 3.6 L Flat-6	Y	71	(Portugal) Pedro Névoa	11
(Switzerland) Haberthur Racing	Porsche 911 GT3-R	Porsche 3.6 L Flat-6	D	60	(France) Sylvain Noël	1–6
(Switzerland) Haberthur Racing	Porsche 911 GT3-R	Porsche 3.6 L Flat-6	D	60	(France) Laurent Cazenave	1–5
(Switzerland) Haberthur Racing	Porsche 911 GT3-R	Porsche 3.6 L Flat-6	D	60	(United Kingdom) Nigel Smith	6
(Switzerland) Haberthur Racing	Porsche 911 GT3-R	Porsche 3.6 L Flat-6	D	60	(Italy) Raffaele Sanguiolo	7
(Switzerland) Haberthur Racing	Porsche 911 GT3-R	Porsche 3.6 L Flat-6	D	60	(Belgium) Loris de Sordi	7
(Switzerland) Haberthur Racing	Porsche 911 GT3-R	Porsche 3.6 L Flat-6	D	60	(Belgium) Jacques Marquet	7
(Switzerland) Haberthur Racing	Porsche 911 GT3-R	Porsche 3.6 L Flat-6	D	60	(Japan) Masahiro Kimoto	7
(Switzerland) Haberthur Racing	Porsche 911 GT3-R	Porsche 3.6 L Flat-6	D	61	(France) Patrick Vuillaume	1
(Switzerland) Haberthur Racing	Porsche 911 GT3-R	Porsche 3.6 L Flat-6	D	61	(Italy) Massimo Frigerio	1
(Switzerland) Haberthur Racing	Porsche 911 GT3-R	Porsche 3.6 L Flat-6	D	61	(Italy) Walter Meloni	1
(Switzerland) Haberthur Racing	Porsche 911 GT3-R	Porsche 3.6 L Flat-6	D	61	(Italy) Massimo Possumato	4
(Switzerland) Haberthur Racing	Porsche 911 GT3-R	Porsche 3.6 L Flat-6	D	61	(Portugal) Bernardo Sá Nogueira	4
(Switzerland) Haberthur Racing	Porsche 911 GT3-R	Porsche 3.6 L Flat-6	D	61	(Italy) Mauro Casadei	5–6
(Switzerland) Haberthur Racing	Porsche 911 GT3-R	Porsche 3.6 L Flat-6	D	61	(United Kingdom) Nigel Smith	5, 8–10
(Switzerland) Haberthur Racing	Porsche 911 GT3-R	Porsche 3.6 L Flat-6	D	61	(Italy) Stefano Zonca	6
(Switzerland) Haberthur Racing	Porsche 911 GT3-R	Porsche 3.6 L Flat-6	D	61	(Switzerland) Andrea Chiesa	8
(Switzerland) Haberthur Racing	Porsche 911 GT3-R	Porsche 3.6 L Flat-6	D	61	(France) Sylvain Noël	9–10
(France) JMB Competition	Ferrari 360 Modena N-GT	Ferrari 3.6 L V8	M	62	(Italy) Christian Pescatori	All
(France) JMB Competition	Ferrari 360 Modena N-GT	Ferrari 3.6 L V8	M	62	(France) David Terrien	All
(France) JMB Competition	Ferrari 360 Modena N-GT	Ferrari 3.6 L V8	M	62	(Italy) Andrea Garbagnati	7
(France) JMB Competition	Ferrari 360 Modena N-GT	Ferrari 3.6 L V8	M	63	(Italy) Andrea Garbagnati	1, 3–4, 6, 8–10
(France) JMB Competition	Ferrari 360 Modena N-GT	Ferrari 3.6 L V8	M	63	(Italy) Batti Pregliasco	1, 3–4, 6, 8, 11
(France) JMB Competition	Ferrari 360 Modena N-GT	Ferrari 3.6 L V8	M	63	(Italy) Marco Lambertini	1, 3, 10–11
(France) JMB Competition	Ferrari 360 Modena N-GT	Ferrari 3.6 L V8	M	63	(Netherlands) Peter Kutemann	9
(France) JMB Competition	Ferrari 360 Modena N-GT	Ferrari 3.6 L V8	M	63	(Switzerland) Iradj Alexander	9
(Czech Republic) Coca-Cola Racing Team	Porsche 911 GT3-R; Porsche 911 GT3-RS	Porsche 3.6 L Flat-6	D	64	(Czech Republic) Josef Venč	1
(Czech Republic) Coca-Cola Racing Team	Porsche 911 GT3-R; Porsche 911 GT3-RS	Porsche 3.6 L Flat-6	D	64	(Czech Republic) Robert Pergl	1
(Czech Republic) Coca-Cola Racing Team	Porsche 911 GT3-R; Porsche 911 GT3-RS	Porsche 3.6 L Flat-6	D	64	(Czech Republic) Jaroslav Janiš	1
(Czech Republic) Coca-Cola Racing Team	Porsche 911 GT3-R; Porsche 911 GT3-RS	Porsche 3.6 L Flat-6	D	64	(Czech Republic) Milan Maderyč	2–3
(Czech Republic) Coca-Cola Racing Team	Porsche 911 GT3-R; Porsche 911 GT3-RS	Porsche 3.6 L Flat-6	D	64	(United States) Tom Sedivy	2
(Czech Republic) Coca-Cola Racing Team	Porsche 911 GT3-R; Porsche 911 GT3-RS	Porsche 3.6 L Flat-6	D	64	(United States) Bobby Brown	2
(Czech Republic) Coca-Cola Racing Team	Porsche 911 GT3-R; Porsche 911 GT3-RS	Porsche 3.6 L Flat-6	D	64	(Slovakia) Jirko Malchárek	3
(Czech Republic) Coca-Cola Racing Team	Porsche 911 GT3-R; Porsche 911 GT3-RS	Porsche 3.6 L Flat-6	D	65	(Slovakia) Jirko Malchárek	1, 4–5
(Czech Republic) Coca-Cola Racing Team	Porsche 911 GT3-R; Porsche 911 GT3-RS	Porsche 3.6 L Flat-6	D	65	(Czech Republic) Milan Maderyč	1
(Czech Republic) Coca-Cola Racing Team	Porsche 911 GT3-R; Porsche 911 GT3-RS	Porsche 3.6 L Flat-6	D	65	(Czech Republic) Tomáš Enge	2–3
(Czech Republic) Coca-Cola Racing Team	Porsche 911 GT3-R; Porsche 911 GT3-RS	Porsche 3.6 L Flat-6	D	65	(United Kingdom) Justin Wilson	3
(Czech Republic) Coca-Cola Racing Team	Porsche 911 GT3-R; Porsche 911 GT3-RS	Porsche 3.6 L Flat-6	D	65	(United States) Tom Sedivy	4–5
(Czech Republic) Coca-Cola Racing Team	Porsche 911 GT3-R; Porsche 911 GT3-RS	Porsche 3.6 L Flat-6	D	65	(Czech Republic) Robert Pergl	4
(Czech Republic) Coca-Cola Racing Team	Porsche 911 GT3-R; Porsche 911 GT3-RS	Porsche 3.6 L Flat-6	D	65	(Czech Republic) Josef Venč	5
(China) Gammon Megaspeed	Porsche 911 GT3-R	Porsche 3.6 L Flat-6	M	66	(Hong Kong) Alex Li	5–7
(China) Gammon Megaspeed	Porsche 911 GT3-R	Porsche 3.6 L Flat-6	M	66	(United Kingdom) Nigel Albon	5
(China) Gammon Megaspeed	Porsche 911 GT3-R	Porsche 3.6 L Flat-6	M	66	(Belgium) Geoffroy Horion	6–7
(China) Gammon Megaspeed	Porsche 911 GT3-R	Porsche 3.6 L Flat-6	M	66	(United States) Gunnar Jeannette	7
(China) Gammon Megaspeed	Porsche 911 GT3-R	Porsche 3.6 L Flat-6	M	66	(Japan) Kenji Kawagoe	7
(Italy) MAC Racing	Porsche 911 GT3-R; Porsche 911 GT3-RS	Porsche 3.6 L Flat-6	D	67	(Italy) Raffale Sangiuolo	1, 3–4, 6, 8, 10–11
(Italy) MAC Racing	Porsche 911 GT3-R; Porsche 911 GT3-RS	Porsche 3.6 L Flat-6	D	67	(Italy) Maurizio Lusuardi	1, 3–4, 8, 10
(Italy) MAC Racing	Porsche 911 GT3-R; Porsche 911 GT3-RS	Porsche 3.6 L Flat-6	D	67	(France) Olivier Porta	5
(Italy) MAC Racing	Porsche 911 GT3-R; Porsche 911 GT3-RS	Porsche 3.6 L Flat-6	D	67	(France) Stéphane Daoudi	5
(Italy) MAC Racing	Porsche 911 GT3-R; Porsche 911 GT3-RS	Porsche 3.6 L Flat-6	D	67	(Italy) Thomas Pichler	6, 11
(Italy) MAC Racing	Porsche 911 GT3-R; Porsche 911 GT3-RS	Porsche 3.6 L Flat-6	D	68	(Italy) Paolo Rapetti	1, 10
(Italy) MAC Racing	Porsche 911 GT3-R; Porsche 911 GT3-RS	Porsche 3.6 L Flat-6	D	68	(Italy) Bepo Orlandi	1
(Italy) MAC Racing	Porsche 911 GT3-R; Porsche 911 GT3-RS	Porsche 3.6 L Flat-6	D	68	(France) Stéphane Daoudi	6
(Italy) MAC Racing	Porsche 911 GT3-R; Porsche 911 GT3-RS	Porsche 3.6 L Flat-6	D	68	(Italy) Mario Sala	6
(Italy) MAC Racing	Porsche 911 GT3-R; Porsche 911 GT3-RS	Porsche 3.6 L Flat-6	D	68	(Italy) Prisca Taruffi	10
(Italy) Autorlando Sport	Porsche 911 GT3-RS	Porsche 3.6 L Flat-6	P	69	(Austria) Philipp Peter	1, 3, 5–6, 8–9, 11
(Italy) Autorlando Sport	Porsche 911 GT3-RS	Porsche 3.6 L Flat-6	P	69	(Venezuela) Johnny Cecotto	1–2
(Italy) Autorlando Sport	Porsche 911 GT3-RS	Porsche 3.6 L Flat-6	P	69	(Switzerland) Andrea Chiesa	2, 6, 10
(Italy) Autorlando Sport	Porsche 911 GT3-RS	Porsche 3.6 L Flat-6	P	69	(Switzerland) Joël Camathias	3, 5, 10–11
(Italy) Autorlando Sport	Porsche 911 GT3-RS	Porsche 3.6 L Flat-6	P	69	(Italy) Alessandro Zampedri	8
(Italy) Autorlando Sport	Porsche 911 GT3-RS	Porsche 3.6 L Flat-6	P	69	(Germany) Marco Werner	9
(Germany) JVG Racing	Porsche 911 GT3-RS	Porsche 3.6 L Flat-6	P	70	(Germany) Jürgen van Gartzen	8–9, 11
(Germany) JVG Racing	Porsche 911 GT3-RS	Porsche 3.6 L Flat-6	P	70	(Switzerland) Bruno Eichmann	8–9, 11
(Spain) Escuderia Bengala	Porsche 911 GT3-R	Porsche 3.6 L Flat-6	D	72	(Spain) Paco Orti	10–11
(Spain) Escuderia Bengala	Porsche 911 GT3-R	Porsche 3.6 L Flat-6	D	72	(Germany) Wolfgang Kaufmann	10–11
(Germany) Jürgen Alzen Motorsport	Porsche 911 GT3-R; Porsche 911 GT3-RS	Porsche 3.6 L Flat-6	Y	74	(Germany) Jochen Berger	9
(Germany) Jürgen Alzen Motorsport	Porsche 911 GT3-R; Porsche 911 GT3-RS	Porsche 3.6 L Flat-6	Y	74	(Germany) Thomas Koch	9
(Germany) Jürgen Alzen Motorsport	Porsche 911 GT3-R; Porsche 911 GT3-RS	Porsche 3.6 L Flat-6	Y	75	(Germany) Jürgen Alzen	9
(Germany) Jürgen Alzen Motorsport	Porsche 911 GT3-R; Porsche 911 GT3-RS	Porsche 3.6 L Flat-6	Y	75	(Germany) Wolf Henzler	9
(Germany) RWS Motorsport	Porsche 911 GT3-R; Porsche 911 GT3-RS	Porsche 3.6 L Flat-6	M	76	(Italy) Gianni Collini	1–5, 8–9
(Germany) RWS Motorsport	Porsche 911 GT3-R; Porsche 911 GT3-RS	Porsche 3.6 L Flat-6	M	76	(Italy) Fabio Mancini	1–4, 8
(Germany) RWS Motorsport	Porsche 911 GT3-R; Porsche 911 GT3-RS	Porsche 3.6 L Flat-6	M	76	(Italy) Giovanni Gulinelli	3, 5–6
(Germany) RWS Motorsport	Porsche 911 GT3-R; Porsche 911 GT3-RS	Porsche 3.6 L Flat-6	M	76	(Spain) Antonio García	6, 10–11
(Germany) RWS Motorsport	Porsche 911 GT3-R; Porsche 911 GT3-RS	Porsche 3.6 L Flat-6	M	76	(Germany) Günther Blieninger	6
(Germany) RWS Motorsport	Porsche 911 GT3-R; Porsche 911 GT3-RS	Porsche 3.6 L Flat-6	M	76	(Austria) Toto Wolff	9
(Germany) RWS Motorsport	Porsche 911 GT3-R; Porsche 911 GT3-RS	Porsche 3.6 L Flat-6	M	76	(Germany) Timo Bernhard	10
(Germany) RWS Motorsport	Porsche 911 GT3-R; Porsche 911 GT3-RS	Porsche 3.6 L Flat-6	M	76	(Austria) Dieter Quester	11
(Germany) RWS Motorsport	Porsche 911 GT3-R; Porsche 911 GT3-RS	Porsche 3.6 L Flat-6	M	77	(Italy) Luca Riccitelli	All
(Germany) RWS Motorsport	Porsche 911 GT3-R; Porsche 911 GT3-RS	Porsche 3.6 L Flat-6	M	77	(Austria) Dieter Quester	1–3, 7–10
(Germany) RWS Motorsport	Porsche 911 GT3-R; Porsche 911 GT3-RS	Porsche 3.6 L Flat-6	M	77	(United Kingdom) Johnny Mowlem	4
(Germany) RWS Motorsport	Porsche 911 GT3-R; Porsche 911 GT3-RS	Porsche 3.6 L Flat-6	M	77	(Italy) Andrea Boldrini	5
(Germany) RWS Motorsport	Porsche 911 GT3-R; Porsche 911 GT3-RS	Porsche 3.6 L Flat-6	M	77	(Germany) Jürgen von Gartzen	6
(Germany) RWS Motorsport	Porsche 911 GT3-R; Porsche 911 GT3-RS	Porsche 3.6 L Flat-6	M	77	(Spain) Antonio García	7
(Germany) RWS Motorsport	Porsche 911 GT3-R; Porsche 911 GT3-RS	Porsche 3.6 L Flat-6	M	77	(Germany) Norman Simon	7
(Germany) RWS Motorsport	Porsche 911 GT3-R; Porsche 911 GT3-RS	Porsche 3.6 L Flat-6	M	77	(Germany) Sascha Maassen	11
(Germany) DD Racing	Porsche 911 GT3-RS	Porsche 3.6 L Flat-6	D	82	(Germany) Volkmar Polaski	7
(Germany) DD Racing	Porsche 911 GT3-RS	Porsche 3.6 L Flat-6	D	82	(Germany) Andreas Kodsi	7
(Germany) DD Racing	Porsche 911 GT3-RS	Porsche 3.6 L Flat-6	D	82	(Germany) Martin Warth	7
(Germany) DD Racing	Porsche 911 GT3-RS	Porsche 3.6 L Flat-6	D	82	(United Kingdom) Marino Franchitti	7
(France) Philippe Brocard	Porsche 911 GT3-RS	Porsche 3.6 L Flat-6		90	(France) Stéphane Echallard	11
(France) Philippe Brocard	Porsche 911 GT3-RS	Porsche 3.6 L Flat-6		90	(France) Jean-Luc Blanchemain	11
(France) Philippe Brocard	Porsche 911 GT3-RS	Porsche 3.6 L Flat-6		90	(France) Olivier Dupard	11
(Netherlands) Peter Kutemann	Ferrari 360 Modena N-GT	Ferrari 3.6 L V8		99	(Netherlands) Peter Kutemann	11
(Netherlands) Peter Kutemann	Ferrari 360 Modena N-GT	Ferrari 3.6 L V8		99	(Switzerland) Iradj Alexander	11

== Results and standings ==
=== Race results ===
Rnd	Circuit	GT Winning Team	N-GT Winning Team	Report
Rnd	Circuit	GT Winning Drivers	N-GT Winning Drivers	Report
1	Monza	(United Kingdom) No. 1 Lister Storm Racing	(Italy) No. 69 Autorlando Sport	Report
1	Monza	(United Kingdom) Jamie Campbell-Walter (Netherlands) Tom Coronel	(Venezuela) Johnny Cecotto (Austria) Philipp Peter	Report
2	Brno	(France) No. 7 Larbre Compétition-Chereau	(Germany) No. 77 RWS Motorsport	Report
2	Brno	(France) Christophe Bouchut (France) Jean-Philippe Belloc	(Italy) Luca Riccitelli (Austria) Dieter Quester	Report
3	Magny-Cours	(United Kingdom) No. 1 Lister Storm Racing	(France) No. 62 JMB Competition	Report
3	Magny-Cours	(United Kingdom) Jamie Campbell-Walter (Netherlands) Tom Coronel	(Italy) Christian Pescatori (France) David Terrien	Report
4	Silverstone	(France) No. 7 Larbre Compétition-Chereau	(France) No. 62 JMB Competition	Report
4	Silverstone	(France) Christophe Bouchut (France) Jean-Philippe Belloc	(Italy) Christian Pescatori (France) David Terrien	Report
5	Zolder	(France) No. 7 Larbre Compétition-Chereau	(Italy) No. 54 ART Engineering	Report
5	Zolder	(France) Christophe Bouchut (France) Jean-Philippe Belloc	(Italy) Luigi Moccia (Italy) Fabio Babini	Report
6	Hungaroring	(Netherlands) No. 3 Team Carsport Holland	(France) No. 62 JMB Competition	Report
6	Hungaroring	(Netherlands) Mike Hezemans (Netherlands) Jeroen Bleekemolen	(Italy) Christian Pescatori (France) David Terrien	Report
7	Spa	(France) No. 7 Larbre Compétition-Chereau	(Germany) No. 77 RWS Motorsport	Report
7	Spa	(France) Christophe Bouchut (France) Jean-Philippe Belloc (Belgium) Marc Duez	(Italy) Luca Riccitelli (Austria) Dieter Quester (Spain) Antonio García (Germany) Norman Simon	Report
8	A1-Ring	(United Kingdom) No. 15 Prodrive Allstars	(France) No. 62 JMB Competition	Report
8	A1-Ring	(Netherlands) Peter Kox (Sweden) Rickard Rydell	(Italy) Christian Pescatori (France) David Terrien	Report
9	Nürburgring	(United Kingdom) No. 1 Lister Storm Racing	(Italy) No. 69 Autorlando Sport	Report
9	Nürburgring	(United Kingdom) Jamie Campbell-Walter (United Kingdom) Mike Jordan	(Austria) Philipp Peter (Germany) Marco Werner	Report
10	Jarama	(United Kingdom) No. 15 Prodrive Allstars	(France) No. 62 JMB Competition	Report
10	Jarama	(Sweden) Rickard Rydell (Switzerland) Alain Menu	(Italy) Christian Pescatori (France) David Terrien	Report
11	Estoril	(Netherlands) No. 3 Team Carsport Holland	(France) No. 55 Perspective Racing	Report
11	Estoril	(Netherlands) Mike Hezemans (Netherlands) Jeroen Bleekemolen	(France) Thierry Perrier (Belgium) Michel Neugarten	Report

Points were awarded to the top six finishers in each category. Entries were required to complete 75% of the race distance in order to be classified as a finisher. Drivers were required to complete 20% of the total race distance for their car to earn points. Teams scored points for all cars that finished a race. For the Spa 24 Hours, points were doubled.

Points system
Event	1st	2nd	3rd	4th	5th	6th
500 km Races	10	6	4	3	2	1
Spa 24 Hours	20	12	8	6	4	2

=== Driver championships ===
==== GT Championship ====
The title was awarded jointly to Christophe Bouchut and Jean-Philippe Belloc who shared the wheel of the No. 7 Larbre Compétition–Chereau Chrysler Viper GTS-R.

Pos.	Driver	Team	MON (Italy)	BRN (Czech Republic)	MAG (France)	SIL (United Kingdom)	ZOL (Belgium)	HUN (Hungary)	SPA (Belgium)	A1R (Austria)	NUR (Germany)	JAR (Spain)	EST (Portugal)	Total points
1	(France) Christophe Bouchut	(France) Larbre Compétition-Chereau	2	1	2	1	1	2	1	5	7	4	3	77
1	(France) Jean-Philippe Belloc	(France) Larbre Compétition-Chereau	2	1	2	1	1	2	1	5	7	4	3	77
2	(Netherlands) Mike Hezemans	(Netherlands) Team Carsport Holland	DNS	3	Ret	Ret	2	1	Ret	2	2	Ret	1	42
2	(Netherlands) Jeroen Bleekemolen	(Netherlands) Team Carsport Holland	DNS	3	Ret	Ret	2	1	Ret	2	2	Ret	1	42
3	(United Kingdom) Jamie Campbell-Walter	(United Kingdom) Lister Storm Racing	1	4	1	Ret	DSQ	Ret		Ret	1	Ret	2	39
4	(Belgium) Vincent Vosse	(France) Paul Belmondo Racing	3	2	3	4	Ret	5	4	Ret	4	2	13	34
5	(France) Boris Derichebourg	(France) Paul Belmondo Racing	3	2	3	4	Ret	5	Ret	Ret	4	2	13	28
6	(Belgium) Marc Duez	(Italy) Team Rafanelli	5	6	7	Ret	3			Ret				27
6	(Belgium) Marc Duez	(France) Larbre Compétition-Chereau							1				Ret	27
7	(Sweden) Rickard Rydell	(United Kingdom) Prodrive Allstars						Ret		1	3	1	11	24
8	(Netherlands) Tom Coronel	(United Kingdom) Lister Storm Racing	1		1	Ret	DSQ	Ret		Ret				20
9	(Netherlands) Michael Bleekemolen	(Netherlands) Team Carsport Holland	DNS	Ret	6	2	Ret	3	Ret	3	Ret	Ret	4	18
9	(Netherlands) Sebastiaan Bleekemolen	(Netherlands) Team Carsport Holland	DNS	Ret	6	2	Ret	3	Ret	3	Ret	Ret	4	18
10	(Netherlands) Peter Kox	(United Kingdom) Prodrive Allstars								1	3			16
10	(Netherlands) Peter Kox	(Germany) Reiter Engineering											5	16
11	(France) Claude-Yves Gosselin	(France) Paul Belmondo Competition	Ret		Ret	3	4	9	5			6	6	16
11	(France) Claude-Yves Gosselin	(France) Paul Belmondo Racing								6	5			16
12	(Belgium) Anthony Kumpen	(France) Paul Belmondo Competition	Ret		Ret	3			5					16
12	(Belgium) Anthony Kumpen	(France) Paul Belmondo Racing		Ret			Ret	6		6	5	3	Ret	16
13	(France) Paul Belmondo	(France) Paul Belmondo Racing	4		Ret					6	5		Ret	14
13	(France) Paul Belmondo	(France) Paul Belmondo Competition		7			4	9	5			6		14
14	(France) Sébastien Bourdais	(France) Larbre Compétition-Chereau							2				Ret	12
14	(France) Patrice Goueslard	(France) Larbre Compétition-Chereau							2					12
14	(France) Sébastien Dumez	(France) Larbre Compétition-Chereau							2					12
15	(France) Emmanuel Clérico	(France) Paul Belmondo Racing		Ret	Ret	6			4			3		11
16	(Germany) Nicolaus Springer	(United Kingdom) Lister Storm Racing	Ret	9	5	Ret	Ret	4		4	6	5	7	11
16	(United Kingdom) Julian Bailey	(United Kingdom) Lister Storm Racing	Ret	9	5	Ret	Ret	4		4	6	5	7	11
17	(Switzerland) Alain Menu	(United Kingdom) Prodrive Allstars						Ret				1	11	10
18	(United Kingdom) Mike Jordan	(United Kingdom) Lister Storm Racing									1			10
19	(Belgium) Robert Dierick	(Belgium) Silver Racing		11	Ret		Ret		3					8
19	(Belgium) Eric De Doncker	(Belgium) Silver Racing		11	Ret		Ret		3					8
20	(Belgium) Vincent Dupont	(Belgium) Silver Racing							3					8
21	(Germany) Günther Blieninger	(Italy) Team Rafanelli	5	6	7	Ret	3							7
22	(Italy) Emanuele Naspetti	(Italy) Team Rafanelli	Ret	5	4	5	Ret		Ret	Ret				7
22	(Italy) Emanuele Naspetti	(Italy) Racing Box											Ret	7
22	(Italy) Mimmo Schiattarella	(Italy) Team Rafanelli	Ret	5	4	5	Ret							7
23	(United Kingdom) Bobby Verdon-Roe	(United Kingdom) Lister Storm Racing										Ret	2	6
24	(France) Éric Hélary	(France) Paul Belmondo Racing							4					6
25	(Belgium) Didier Defourney	(France) Paul Belmondo Racing	4		Ret	6	Ret	6	Ret					5
25	(Belgium) Didier Defourney	(France) Paul Belmondo Competition		7										5
26	(Portugal) Tiago Monteiro	(France) Larbre Compétition-Chereau											3	4
27	(United Kingdom) Richard Dean	(United Kingdom) Lister Storm Racing		4										3
28	(France) Jean-Pierre Jarier	(France) Team ART	Ret	11	Ret	8	5	7		Ret	8	8	10	2
28	(France) François Lafon	(France) Team ART	Ret	11	Ret	8	5	7		Ret	8	8	10	2
29	(United Kingdom) Oliver Gavin	(Germany) Reiter Engineering											5	2
30	(Belgium) Wim Daems	(Belgium) GLPK Racing	DNS	8	9	Ret	Ret	Ret	6		9	7	Ret	2
31	(Germany) Georg Severich	(Belgium) GLPK Racing							6		9			2
32	(Belgium) Bert Longin	(Belgium) GLPK Racing							6				Ret	2
33	(Italy) Luca Cappellari	(Italy) Racing Box	DNS	Ret	8	7	6	8		7	11	Ret	Ret	1
33	(Italy) Gabrielle Matteuzzi	(Italy) Racing Box	DNS	Ret	8	7	6	8		7	11	Ret		1
34	(Italy) Gabriele Sabatini	(Italy) Autorlando Sport	6	10	DNS					Ret	13	Ret	12	1
34	(Italy) Marco Spinelli	(Italy) Autorlando Sport	6	10	DNS						13	Ret	12	1
35	(Italy) Fabio Villa	(Italy) Autorlando Sport	6											1
35	(France) Luis Marques	(France) Paul Belmondo Competition											6	1
Pos.	Driver	Team	MON (Italy)	BRN (Czech Republic)	MAG (France)	SIL (United Kingdom)	ZOL (Belgium)	HUN (Hungary)	SPA (Belgium)	A1R (Austria)	NUR (Germany)	JAR (Spain)	EST (Portugal)	Total points

Colour	Result
Gold	Winner
Silver	Second place
Bronze	Third place
Green	Points classification
Blue	Non-points classification
Blue	Non-classified finish (NC)
Purple	Retired, not classified (Ret)
Red	Did not qualify (DNQ)
Red	Did not pre-qualify (DNPQ)
Black	Disqualified (DSQ)
White	Did not start (DNS)
White	Withdrew (WD)
White	Race cancelled (C)
Blank	Did not practice (DNP)
Blank	Did not arrive (DNA)
Blank	Excluded (EX)

==== N-GT Cup ====
The title was awarded jointly to Christian Pescatori and David Terrien who drove the No. 62 JMB Competition Ferrari 360 Modena N-GT.

Pos.	Driver	Team	MON (Italy)	BRN (Czech Republic)	MAG (France)	SIL (United Kingdom)	ZOL (Belgium)	HUN (Hungary)	SPA (Belgium)	A1R (Austria)	NUR (Germany)	JAR (Spain)	EST (Portugal)	Total points
1	(Italy) Christian Pescatori	(France) JMB Competition	Ret	2	1	1	Ret	1	Ret	1	8	1	3	60
1	(France) David Terrien	(France) JMB Competition	Ret	2	1	1	Ret	1	Ret	1	8	1	3	60
2	(Italy) Luca Riccitelli	(Germany) RWS Motorsport	2	1	2	3	3	9	1	Ret	6	2	15	57
3	(Austria) Dieter Quester	(Germany) RWS Motorsport	2	1	2				1	Ret	6	2	4	52
4	(France) Thierry Perrier	(France) Perspective Racing	3	5	8	Ret	4	4	3	5	3	Ret	1	36
4	(Belgium) Michel Neugarten	(France) Perspective Racing	3	5	8	Ret	4	4	3	5	3	Ret	1	36
5	(Monaco) Stéphane Ortelli	(Germany) Freisinger Motorsport	5	8	4		2	7	2	2	2		14	35
6	(Italy) Fabio Babini	(Italy) ART Engineering	4	9	Ret	2	1	3	5	7	Ret	3	5	33
7	(France) Sébastien Dumez	(France) Larbre Compétition-Chereau	6	4	5	4	Ret	2		3	4	11	2	28
8	(Italy) Luigi Moccia	(Italy) ART Engineering	4	9	Ret	2	1	3		7	Ret	3		27
9	(Austria) Philipp Peter	(Italy) Autorlando Sport	1		Ret		Ret	Ret		6	1		Ret	25
9	(Austria) Philipp Peter	(Italy) ART Engineering							5					25
10	(France) Patrice Goueslard	(France) Larbre Compétition-Chereau	6	4	5	4	Ret	2		3		11	2	25
11	(Spain) Antonio García	(Germany) RWS Motorsport						6	1			Ret	4	24
12	(Germany) Norman Simon	(Germany) RWS Motorsport							1					20
13	(France) Cyrille Sauvage	(Germany) Freisinger Motorsport							2			4		15
14	(Switzerland) Andrea Chiesa	(Italy) Autorlando Sport		6				Ret				Ret		13
14	(Switzerland) Andrea Chiesa	(Germany) Freisinger Motorsport							2					13
14	(Switzerland) Andrea Chiesa	(Switzerland) Haberthur Racing								Ret				13
15	(Germany) Wolfgang Kaufmann	(Germany) Freisinger Motorsport	5	8	4	Ret	2	7						12
15	(Germany) Wolfgang Kaufmann	(Spain) Escuderia Bengala										6	9	12
16	(Venezuela) Johnny Cecotto	(Italy) Autorlando Sport	1	6										11
17	(Germany) Marco Werner	(Italy) Autorlando Sport									1			10
18	(United Kingdom) Robin Liddell	(Germany) Freisinger Motorsport									2	4		9
19	(Belgium) Kurt Thiers	(France) Perspective Racing							3					8
20	(Germany) Jürgen van Gartzen	(France) Larbre Compétition-Chereau	Ret	3	9	Ret								7
20	(Germany) Jürgen van Gartzen	(Germany) RWS Motorsport						9						7
20	(Germany) Jürgen van Gartzen	(Germany) JVG Racing								10	5		6	7
21	(Switzerland) Bruno Eichmann	(France) Larbre Compétition-Chereau	Ret	3	9	Ret								7
21	(Switzerland) Bruno Eichmann	(Germany) JVG Racing								10	5		6	7
22	(Portugal) Ni Amorim	(Germany) Freisinger Motorsport								2				6
23	(United Kingdom) Steve O'Rourke	(United Kingdom) EMKA Racing	Ret	11	12	6	Ret	5		4	7	7	Ret	6
23	(United Kingdom) Tim Sugden	(United Kingdom) EMKA Racing	Ret	11	12	6	Ret	5		4	7	7	Ret	6
24	(France) Thierry Depoix	(Germany) Freisinger Racing							4					6
24	(France) Philippe Haezebrouck	(Germany) Freisinger Racing							4					6
24	(Switzerland) Toni Seiler	(Germany) Freisinger Racing							4					6
25	(Italy) Gianni Collini	(Germany) RWS Motorsport	8	13	6	Ret	Ret			Ret	Ret			5
25	(Italy) Gianni Collini	(Italy) ART Engineering							5					5
26	(Czech Republic) Tomáš Enge	(Czech Republic) Coca-Cola Racing Team		7	3									4
27	(United Kingdom) Justin Wilson	(Czech Republic) Coca-Cola Racing Team			3									4
27	(United Kingdom) Johnny Mowlem	(Germany) RWS Motorsport				3								4
27	(Italy) Andrea Boldrini	(Germany) RWS Motorsport					3							4
28	(Italy) Andrea Bertolini	(Italy) ART Engineering	Ret	12	11	8	5	8		9	Ret	5	11	4
29	(Czech Republic) Jirko Malchárek	(Czech Republic) Coca-Cola Racing Team	Ret		7	13	9							4
29	(Czech Republic) Jirko Malchárek	(Italy) ART Engineering						8	5	9	Ret			4
30	(Germany) André Ahrlé	(France) Larbre Compétition-Chereau						10			4			3
31	(France) Laurent Cazenave	(Switzerland) Haberthur Racing	Ret	10	10	7	6							3
31	(France) Laurent Cazenave	(Italy) ART Engineering										5		3
32	(United Kingdom) Nigel Smith	(Germany) Freisinger Motorsport	7	14	7	11								2
32	(United Kingdom) Nigel Smith	(Switzerland) Haberthur Racing					Ret	Ret		Ret	9	8		2
32	(United Kingdom) Nigel Smith	(Italy) ART Engineering											5	2
33	(Italy) Batti Pregliasco	(France) JMB Competition	Ret		Ret	5		12		11			8	2
33	(Italy) Alberto Radaelli	(Italy) ART Engineering	Ret	12	11	8	5							2
34	(Italy) Andrea Garbagnati	(France) JMB Competition	Ret		Ret	5		12	Ret	11	Ret	9		2
35	(France) Jean-Luc Chéreau	(France) Larbre Compétition-Chereau			5			10						2
36	(Italy) Giovanni Gulinelli	(Germany) RWS Motorsport			6		Ret	6						2
37	(Germany) Volkmar Polaski	(Germany) DD Racing							6					2
37	(Germany) Andreas Kodsi	(Germany) DD Racing							6					2
37	(Germany) Martin Warth	(Germany) DD Racing							6					2
37	(United Kingdom) Marino Franchitti	(Germany) DD Racing							6					2
38	(France) Sylvain Noël	(Switzerland) Haberthur Racing	Ret	10	10	7	6	Ret			9	8		1
39	(Italy) Fabio Mancini	(Germany) RWS Motorsport	8	13	6	Ret				Ret				1
40	(Spain) Paco Orti	(Spain) Escuderia Bengala										6	9	1
41	(Germany) Günther Blieninger	(Germany) RWS Motorsport						6						1
41	(Italy) Alessandro Zampedri	(Italy) Autorlando Sport								6				1
Pos.	Driver	Team	MON (Italy)	BRN (Czech Republic)	MAG (France)	SIL (United Kingdom)	ZOL (Belgium)	HUN (Hungary)	SPA (Belgium)	A1R (Austria)	NUR (Germany)	JAR (Spain)	EST (Portugal)	Total points

=== Team championships ===
==== GT Championship ====
Pos.	Team	MON (Italy)	BRN (Czech Republic)	MAG (France)	SIL (United Kingdom)	ZOL (Belgium)	HUN (Hungary)	SPA (Belgium)	A1R (Austria)	NUR (Germany)	JAR (Spain)	EST (Portugal)	Total points
1	(France) Larbre Compétition-Chereau	2	1	2	1	1	2	1	5	7	4	3	89
1	(France) Larbre Compétition-Chereau							2				Ret	89
2	(Netherlands) Team Carsport Holland	DNS	3	6	2	2	1	Ret	2	2	Ret	1	60
2	(Netherlands) Team Carsport Holland	DNS	Ret	Ret	Ret	Ret	3	Ret	3	Ret	Ret	4	60
3	(United Kingdom) Lister Storm Racing	1	4	1	Ret	Ret	4		4	1	5	2	50
3	(United Kingdom) Lister Storm Racing	Ret	9	5	Ret	DSQ	Ret		Ret	6	Ret	7	50
4	(France) Paul Belmondo Racing	3	2	3	4	Ret	5	4	6	4	2	13	46
4	(France) Paul Belmondo Racing	4	Ret	Ret	6	Ret	6	Ret	Ret	5	3	Ret	46
5	(United Kingdom) Prodrive Allstars						Ret		1	3	1	11	24
6	(Italy) Team Rafanelli	5	5	4	5	3		Ret	Ret				14
6	(Italy) Team Rafanelli	Ret	6	7	Ret	Ret							14
7	(France) Paul Belmondo Competition	Ret	7	Ret	3	4	9	5			6	6	13
8	(Belgium) Silver Racing		12	Ret		Ret		3					8
9	(France) Team ART	Ret	11	Ret	8	5	7		Ret	8	8	10	2
10	(Germany) Reiter Engineering					Ret	Ret		Ret	12		5	2
11	(Belgium) GLPK Racing	DNS	8	9	Ret	Ret	Ret	6		9	7	Ret	2
12	(Italy) Racing Box	DNS	Ret	8	7	6	8		7	11	Ret	Ret	1
13	(Italy) Autorlando Sport	6	10	DNS					Ret	13	Ret	12	1
-	(Belgium) PSI Motorsport Team					7		Ret		10	Ret		0
-	(Germany) Proton Competition	Ret	13	Ret	9	Ret	Ret		NC	DNS	NC	8	0
-	(Germany) Proton Competition										Ret	9	0
-	(Germany) Wieth Racing		Ret	Ret			Ret			14			0
-	(Hungary) Bovi Racing						Ret						0

Colour	Result
Gold	Winner
Silver	Second place
Bronze	Third place
Green	Points classification
Blue	Non-points classification
Blue	Non-classified finish (NC)
Purple	Retired, not classified (Ret)
Red	Did not qualify (DNQ)
Red	Did not pre-qualify (DNPQ)
Black	Disqualified (DSQ)
White	Did not start (DNS)
White	Withdrew (WD)
White	Race cancelled (C)
Blank	Did not practice (DNP)
Blank	Did not arrive (DNA)
Blank	Excluded (EX)

==== N-GT Cup ====
Pos.	Team	MON (Italy)	BRN (Czech Republic)	MAG (France)	SIL (United Kingdom)	ZOL (Belgium)	HUN (Hungary)	SPA (Belgium)	A1R (Austria)	NUR (Germany)	JAR (Spain)	EST (Portugal)	Total points
1	(France) JMB Competition	Ret	2	1	1	Ret	1	Ret	1	8	1	3	62
1	(France) JMB Competition	Ret		Ret	5		12		11	Ret	9	8	62
2	(Germany) RWS Motorsport	2	1	2	3	3	6	1	Ret	6	2	4	62
2	(Germany) RWS Motorsport	8	13	6	Ret	Ret	9		Ret	Ret	Ret	15	62
3	(Germany) Freisinger Motorsport	5	8	4	11	2	7	2	2	2	4	13	38
3	(Germany) Freisinger Motorsport	7	14	7	Ret	8		Ret	8	10		14	38
4	(Italy) ART Engineering	4	9	11	2	1	3	5	7	Ret	3	5	37
4	(Italy) ART Engineering	Ret	12	Ret	8	5	8		9	Ret	5	11	37
5	(France) Perspective Racing	3	5	8	Ret	4	4	3	5	3	Ret	1	36
6	(France) Larbre Compétition-Chereau	6	3	5	4	Ret	2		3	4	11	2	32
6	(France) Larbre Compétition-Chereau	Ret	4	9	Ret		10						32
7	(Italy) Autorlando Sport	1	6	Ret		Ret	Ret		6	1	Ret	Ret	22
8	(United Kingdom) EMKA Racing	Ret	11	12	6	Ret	5		4	7	7	Ret	6
9	(Germany) Freisinger Racing	13	Ret	13	10	DNS	Ret	4	12	11	Ret	10	6
9	(Germany) Freisinger Racing											16	6
10	(Czech Republic) Coca-Cola Racing Team	11	7	3	13	9							4
10	(Czech Republic) Coca-Cola Racing Team	Ret	15	DNS									4
11	(Germany) JVG Racing								10	5		6	3
12	(Germany) DD Racing							6					2
13	(Switzerland) Haberthur Racing	9	10	10	7	6	Ret	DNS	Ret	9	8		1
13	(Switzerland) Haberthur Racing	Ret			9	Ret	Ret						1
14	(Spain) Escuderia Bengala										6	9	1
-	(Italy) MAC Racing	10		14	12	7	13		13		10	12	0
-	(Italy) MAC Racing	12					Ret				Ret		0
-	(China) Gammon Megaspeed					10	11	7					0
-	(Netherlands) Peter Kutemann											7	0
-	(Germany) Jürgen Alzen Motorsport									12			0
-	(Germany) Jürgen Alzen Motorsport									Ret			0
-	(France) Philippe Brocard											Ret	0

== Bibliography ==
- Asselberghs, Denis; Richardson, Frederic (2001). 2001 FIA GT Championship Annual. Brussels: Apach Media. ISBN 978-2930354118.
