= RWS Motorsport =

(Germany) RWS Motorsport
- Founded: December 1995
- Founder(s): Rudi Walch
- Base: Anger, Germany
- Former series: BPR Global GT Series; FIA GT Championship; GTR Euroseries; American Le Mans Series; Sports Racing World Cup
- Noted drivers: (Italy) Raffaele Sanguiolo (Italy) Luca Riccitelli (Germany) Günther Blieninger (Austria) Philipp Peter (Austria) Dieter Quester (Russia) Aleksey Vasilyev (Russia) Nikolai Fomenko
- Website: http://www.rws-motorsport.com/

RWS Motorsport is an auto racing team based in Anger, Bavaria, Germany. Founded in 1995 by former racing driver and engineer Rudi Walch, the team has been involved in multiple international series, primarily the FIA GT Championship. The team were the vice champions of the N-GT category of the FIA GT Championship in 2000 and 2001. Since 2003, RWS has concentrated on historic motorsport and vehicle restoration, repair, and sales.

== History ==
After racing for Schnitzer Motorsport in the 1970s, Rudi Walch became involved with Brun Motorsport as a driver before becoming a technical engineer for the team in 1983. After Brun was liquidated in 1993, Walch acquired much of the former team's equipment as well as hiring former personnel to form RWS Motorsport in 1995. The new team initially competed selectively in the BPR Global GT Series with a Porsche 911 GT2, a car which they would campaign for several years. In 1997 the BPR series became the FIA GT Championship, and RWS with Italian drivers Luca Riccitelli and Raffaele Sangiuolo competed in the bulk of the races in the season. RWS concentrated on the inaugural GTR Euroseries for 1998, a series intended for teams with amateur drivers, before returning to FIA GT in 1999 with the father-son duo of Horst Felbermayr and Horst Felbermayr Jr. The team also added sports prototype racing in the SportsRacing World Cup with a Riley & Scott-BMW with Riccitelli joining Günther Blieninger, and ran a partial season of the American Le Mans Series after one-off visits to the Rolex 24 at Daytona in the United States the previous years.

In 2000 Porsche introduced the new 911 GT3-R for the FIA GT Championship's new N-GT category. RWS, with new drivers Philipp Peter and Dieter Quester and the backing of Quester's sponsor Red Bull, purchased two new cars. The team introduced their new purchase at the Rolex 24 at Daytona where they finished tenth overall and second in the GTU class. Back in Europe, the team won FIA GT races at Circuit Zolder and EuroSpeedway Lausitz en route to second in the teams' championship and Riccitelli finished second in the drivers' championship. Quester and Riccitelli paired up for 2001, winning at Brno Circuit before following it up with a 5th-place finish and class victory at the Spa 24 Hours. The team finished the season tied on points with JMB Competition for the N-GT Championship but were deemed second place on the tie-breaker. Riccitelli finished second in the drivers' championship while Quester was third.

RWS split their season in 2002, campaigning the GT3-R in the N-GT category for Russians Aleksey Vasilyev and Nikolai Fomenko while also developing a variant of the GT3-R for the GT category for Riccitelli and Quester. The resulting 911 GT, which featured an enlarged and more powerful motor, struggled and was abandoned after the third round of the season, while Quester and Riccitelli later moved to another team within the series. The N-GT campaign netted a fourth place championship result. Vasilyev and Fomenko increased their involvement in the team in 2003, bringing Russian Yukos title sponsorship as they returned to a two-car N-GT entry, but the season was winless and the duo would take their sponsor and move to Freisinger Motorsport in 2004.

RWS would then turn to the restoration of racing cars and road car repairs, occasionally competing in historic racing and support of other racing teams. An RWS-backed SEAT León won the TCR category of the 2016 24 Hours of Nürburgring.
