= Nikolai Fomenko =

Russian composer (born 1962)

- Николай Фоменко
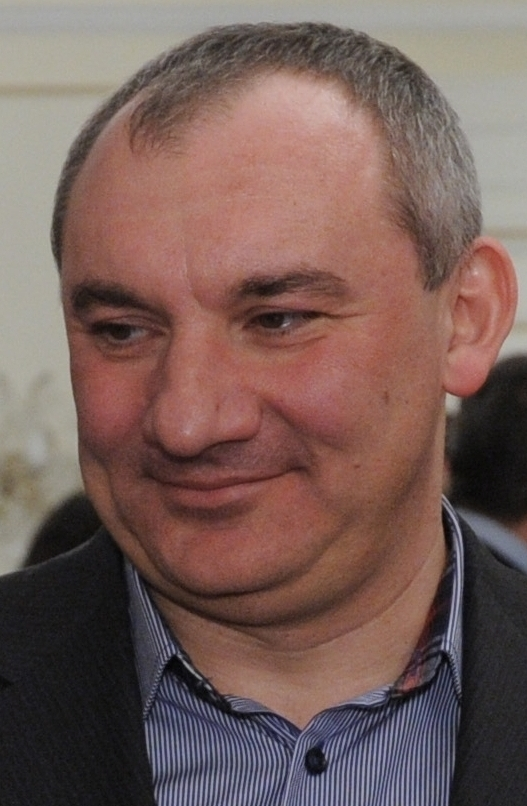
- Fomenko in 2012
- Born: Nikolai Vladimirovich Fomenko; 30 April 1962 (age 64); Leningrad, Soviet Union (now Saint Petersburg, Russia)
- Occupations: motor racer, musician, comic actor
- Spouse: Maria Golubkina

Nikolay Vladimirovich Fomenko (Russian: Николай Владимирович Фоменко, born 30 April 1962) is a Russian musician, comic actor, professional motor racer, former president of Marussia Motors and former engineering director of Marussia F1.

== Biography ==
Born in Leningrad on April 30, 1962.

Father - Vladimir Ivanovich Fomenko, physicist-metrologist, who worked for many years at VNIIM. Vladimir Fomenko was one of the developers of homing missiles.

Mother - Galina Nikolaevna Fomenko (nee Fedorova), after her grandmother from the nobility of the Skrypitsins, a ballerina, G. S. Ulanova identified her at the Vaganovsk Choreographic School. Due to a meniscus injury, she was forced to change her profession and became a civil engineer.

He studied at school No. 222, which at that time was re-qualified as the School of the Olympic Reserve. Simultaneously with his studies at school, he studied at the Theater of Youth Creativity (TYuT), played in the symphony orchestra of the Leningrad Palace of Pioneers on the first violin.

In 1983 he graduated from the Leningrad State Institute of Theatre, Music and Cinematography (LGITMiK). While studying at the institute, he organized the Secret group, a member of the Komsomol. After graduating from the institute, he worked for distribution at the Alexandrinsky Theater.

Since January 1993, he began to live and work in Moscow.

== Music career ==
Fomenko started his career as vocalist and guitarist in the band Secret, who were very popular in Russia in the mid-1980s.

== Acting career ==
Fomenko first started his acting career as a theater actor in the Theater of Youth Creativity (1974-1976).

=== Filmography ===
Year	Film	Role
1983	Speed (Skorost')	Student
1997	Sympathy Seeker (Sirota Kazanskaya)	Kolya
1999	Luna Papa (Lunny Papa)	Yassir
1999	The Sky with Diamonds (Nebo v Almazakh)	Anton Chekhov
2000	Check (Chek)	Brunet
2000	Old Hags (Starye Klyachi)	businessman Vassily Khomenko
2003	The Suit (Shik)	Botya
2003	Bedroom Key (Klyuch ot Spal'ni)	Vakhlakov
2007	Model (Naturshchitsa)	
2007	Gloss (Глянец)	
2008	Radio Day (Den' Radio)	As himself
2017	You All Infuriate Me	Boris Dmitrievich
2017	Rock Dog	Angus Scattergood
2024	Others	Leonid Vasilyevich Petrov
2024	Fedya. Narodnyy futbolist	Konstantin Beskov

== TV career ==
Fomenko performed in the popular Russian music collection series Staryye Pesni o Glavnom (Old songs about the important).

1997—1998 Empire of Passion (NTV, reruns — TNT, MUZ-TV) — author and host.

He hosted two seasons of a TV show The Interception and a season of the game-show The Weakest Link on Russia's Channel 5.

In 2009, he began hosting Top Gear Russia, the REN-TV spin-off of the BBC series Top Gear.

== Car racing career ==
In 1994, Fomenko was invited by Vladislav Listyev to participate in a car racing show as a celebrity guest. Later he started to train as a professional racer and took his first victory in 1996.

=== FIA GT ===
Year	Team	Car	№	Class	Co-drivers	Points	Pos.
2000	Freisinger Motorsport	Porsche 996 GT3-R	58	N-GT	(Russia) Alexey Vasilyev	0	—
2001	Freisinger Racing	Porsche 996 GT3-R	59	N-GT	(Russia) Alexey Vasilyev (United Kingdom) Richard Kaye	0	—
2002	RWS Motorsport	Porsche 996 GT3-R	77	N-GT	(Russia) Alexey Vasilyev (Spain) Antonio García (Spain) Jesus Diez Villaroel	1	26
2003	RWS Yukos Motorsport	Porsche 996 GT3-R	77	N-GT	(Russia) Alexey Vasilyev (United Kingdom) Adam Jones (France) Stephane Daoudi	17	14
2004	Freisinger Yukos Motorsport	Porsche 996 GT3-RSR	77	N-GT	(Russia) Alexey Vasilyev	26	7
2004	Cirtek Motorsport	Porsche 996 GT3-RS	73	N-GT	(United Kingdom) Adam Jones (United Kingdom) John Grant (United States) Vic Rice	26	7
2005	Russian Age Racing	Ferrari 550 Maranello	17; 18	GT1	(Russia) Alexey Vasilyev (France) Christophe Bouchut (United Kingdom) Jamie Campbell-Walter (France) Nicolas Minassian	5	19

=== Endurance races ===
Year	Race	Team	Car	Class	Co-drivers	Pos.
2003	24 Hours of Daytona	RWS Motorsport	Porsche 996	GTS	(Russia) Alexey Vasilyev, (France) Patrick Bourdais (Austria) Walter Lechner Jr., (Japan) Tetsuya Tanaka	28 (9)
2004	24 Hours of Le Mans	Freisinger Motorsport	Porsche 911 GT3-RSR	LMGT	(Russia) Alexey Vasilyev, (France) Patrick Bourdais	DNF
2005	24 Hours of Le Mans	Cirtek Motorsport/ Russian Age Racing/ Convers Team	Ferrari 550-GTS Maranello	LMGT1	(Russia) Alexey Vasilyev, (France) Christophe Bouchut	17 (5)

== Car manufacturer ==
Fomenko is involved in the development and launching of the Marussia sports car.

=== Formula One ===
In 2010 Marussia became a sponsor of Virgin Racing Formula One team. On 11 November 2010, Marussia acquired a controlling stake in the team.

On 2 February 2011 Fomenko was announced as Engineering Director of the Marussia Virgin Racing Formula One team.

== Personal life ==
He was married to Andrei Mironov's stepdaughter, actress Maria Golubkina, and has three children: daughters Anastasia and Ekaterina, and a son, Ivan.
