= 6 Hours of Zhuhai =

Intercontinental Le Mans Cup
- Venue: Zhuhai International Circuit
- First race: 1994
- First ILMC race: 2010
- Duration: 6 hours
- Most wins (manufacturer): Porsche (3)

The 6 Hours of Zhuhai is a sports car endurance race held at the Zhuhai International Circuit in Zhuhai, Guangdong, China. The race was first held in 1994 on Zhuhai Street Circuit as a round of the BPR Global GT Series. It was held 7 times in 14 years in BPR and the FIA GT Championship, and revived in 2010 under the Intercontinental Le Mans Cup.

== Results ==
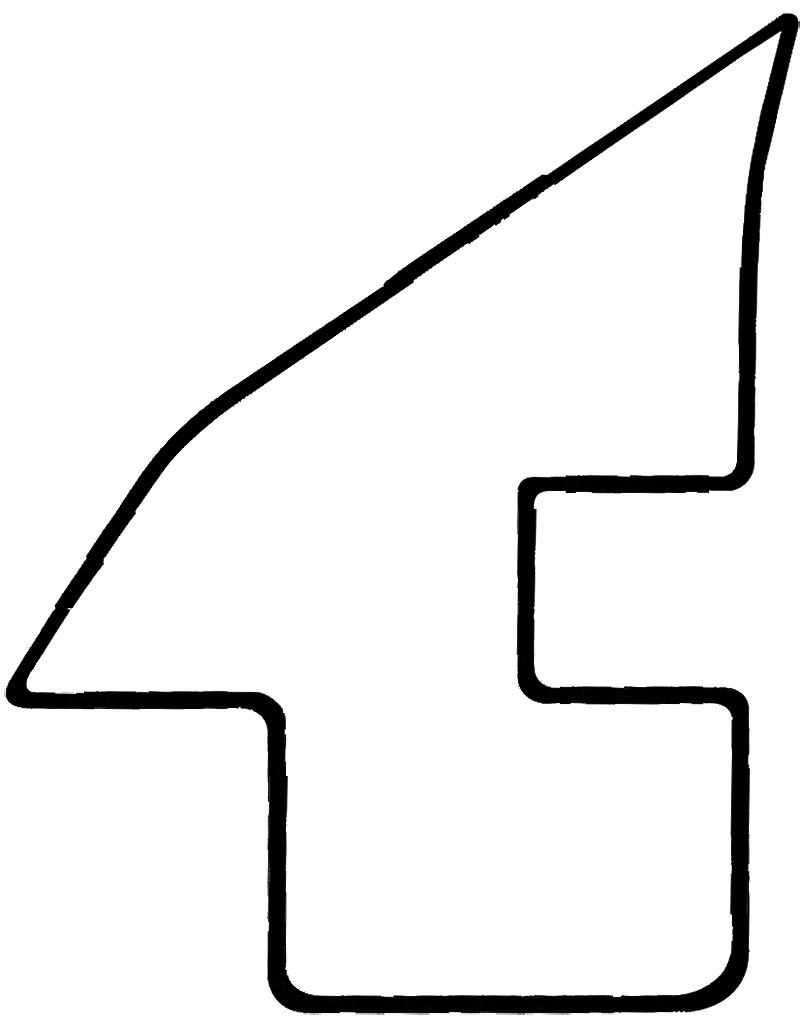
Zhuhai Street Circuit, used in 1994–1995

Year	Overall winner(s)	Entrant	Car	Distance/Duration	Race title	Series	Report
Zhuhai Street Circuit
1994	(France) Bob Wollek (France) Jean-Pierre Jarier (France) Jacques Laffite	(France) Larbre Compétition	Porsche 911 Turbo S LM	3 hours	3 Hours of Zhuhai	BPR Global GT Series	report
1995	(United Kingdom) Andy Wallace (France) Olivier Grouillard	(United Kingdom) Mach One Racing	McLaren F1 GTR	3 hours	Shell Zhuhai International Race	BPR Global GT Series	report
Zhuhai International Circuit
1996	(France) Emmanuel Collard (Germany) Ralf Kelleners	(Germany) Porsche AG	Porsche 911 GT1	4 hours	4 Hours of Zhuhai	BPR Global GT Series	report
1997	(United Kingdom) John Greasley (United Kingdom) Geoff Lister (Sweden) Magnus Wallinder	(United Kingdom) G-Force/Strandell	Porsche 911 GT1	3 hours	Zhuhai - Marlboro Global Endurance GT Race	Non-championship	report
1998: Not held
1999	(Austria) Karl Wendlinger (Monaco) Olivier Beretta	(France) Viper Team Oreca	Chrysler Viper GTS-R	3 hours	Zhuhai 500 Kilometres	FIA GT Championship	report
2000–2003: Not held
2004	(Finland) Mika Salo (Italy) Andrea Bertolini	(Italy) AF Corse	Maserati MC12 GT1	3 hours	LG Super Racing Weekend Zhuhai	FIA GT Championship	report
2005	(Belgium) Anthony Kumpen (Belgium) Bert Longin (Netherlands) Mike Hezemans	(Belgium) GLPK-Carsport	Chevrolet Corvette C5-R	3 hours	Zhuhai Supercar 500	FIA GT Championship	report
2006: Not held
2007	(France) Christophe Bouchut (Germany) Stefan Mücke	(Germany) All-Inkl.com Racing	Lamborghini Murciélago R-GT	2 hours	Zhuhai 2 Hours	FIA GT Championship	report
2008-2009: Not held
2010	(France) Franck Montagny (France) Stéphane Sarrazin	(France) Peugeot Sport Total	Peugeot 908 HDi FAP	1,000 km (620 mi)	1000 Kilometres of Zhuhai	Intercontinental Le Mans Cup	report
2011	(France) Sébastien Bourdais (United Kingdom) Anthony Davidson	(France) Peugeot Sport Total	Peugeot 908	6 hours	6 Hours of Zhuhai	Intercontinental Le Mans Cup	report

=== Asian Le Mans Series ===
Year	Overall Winner(s)	Entrant	Car	Duration	Race Title	Championship	Report	Ref
2013	(China) Ho-Pin Tung (China) David Cheng (Hong Kong) Shaun Thong	(France) OAK Racing	Morgan LMP2	3:00:12	3 Hours of Zhuhai	Asian Le Mans Series	report	
2016	(China) Ho-Pin Tung (United States) Gustavo Menezes	(China) Jackie Chan DC Racing	Oreca 03R	4:00:35	4 Hours of Zhuhai	Asian Le Mans Series	report	
2017	(France) Thomas Laurent (United Kingdom) Harrison Newey (Monaco) Stéphane Richelmi	(China) Jackie Chan DC Racing X Jota	Oreca 05	4:00:06	4 Hours of Zhuhai	Asian Le Mans Series	report	
