= Zhang Shanqi =

Chinese racecar driver

Zhang Shan Qi
- Simplified Chinese: 张善祺
Transcriptions

Zhang Shanqi
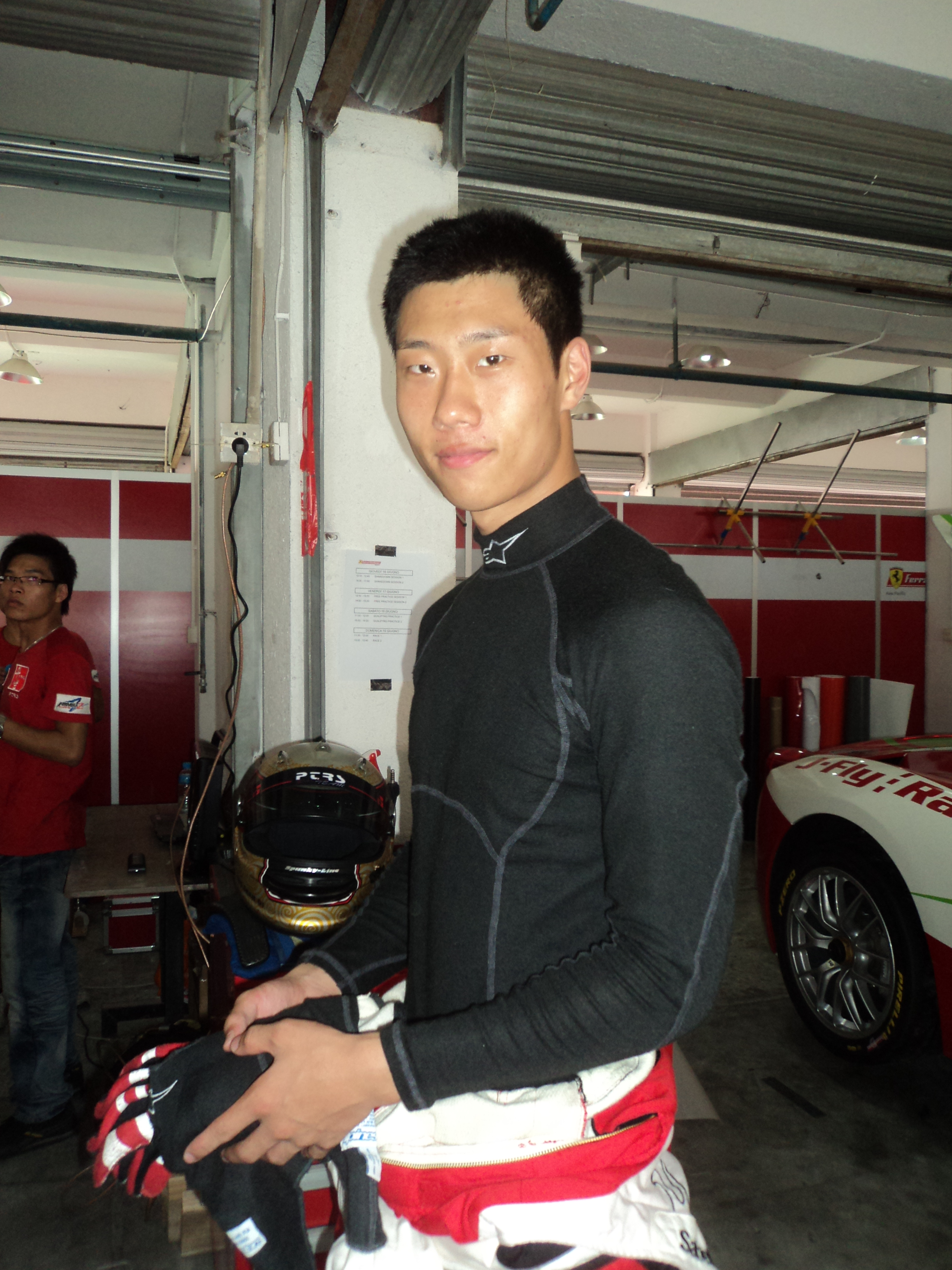
- Zhang Shan Qi at Audi ZIC in June 2011.
- Nationality: (China)
- Born: April 1, 1991 (age 35) Heilongjiang, China

Intercontinental Le Mans Cup career
- Debut season: 2010
- Current team: Hope Polevision Racing
- Car number: 91
- Former teams: PTRS
- Wins: 1
- Podiums: 2

Previous series
- 2008 2009, 2010: Asian Formula Renault Challenge; Australian Formula 3

Zhang Shanqi (born 1 April 1991) is a racecar driver from China. He competed in Australian Formula 3 in 2009 and 2010, and the Intercontinental Le Mans Cup in 2010 and 2011.

Zhang Shan Qi who was born in Heilongjiang, China in 1991. He is the only child of his family. He was brought to live and study in Guangzhou with his parents. Shan Qi has always been interested in motor racing and have been looking for opportunities to participate since young. Shan Qi came to know his mentor who is also his current coach, Chen Wei Liang and joined PTRS Racing in the year 2007.

== Asian Formula Renault Challenge ==
At the age of 17, Zhang Shan Qi achieved his dream of becoming a racing driver. On 21 September 2008, he entered his first ever race. In his first race, he failed to finish but in the second race, he finished 13th.

== Australian Formula 3 ==
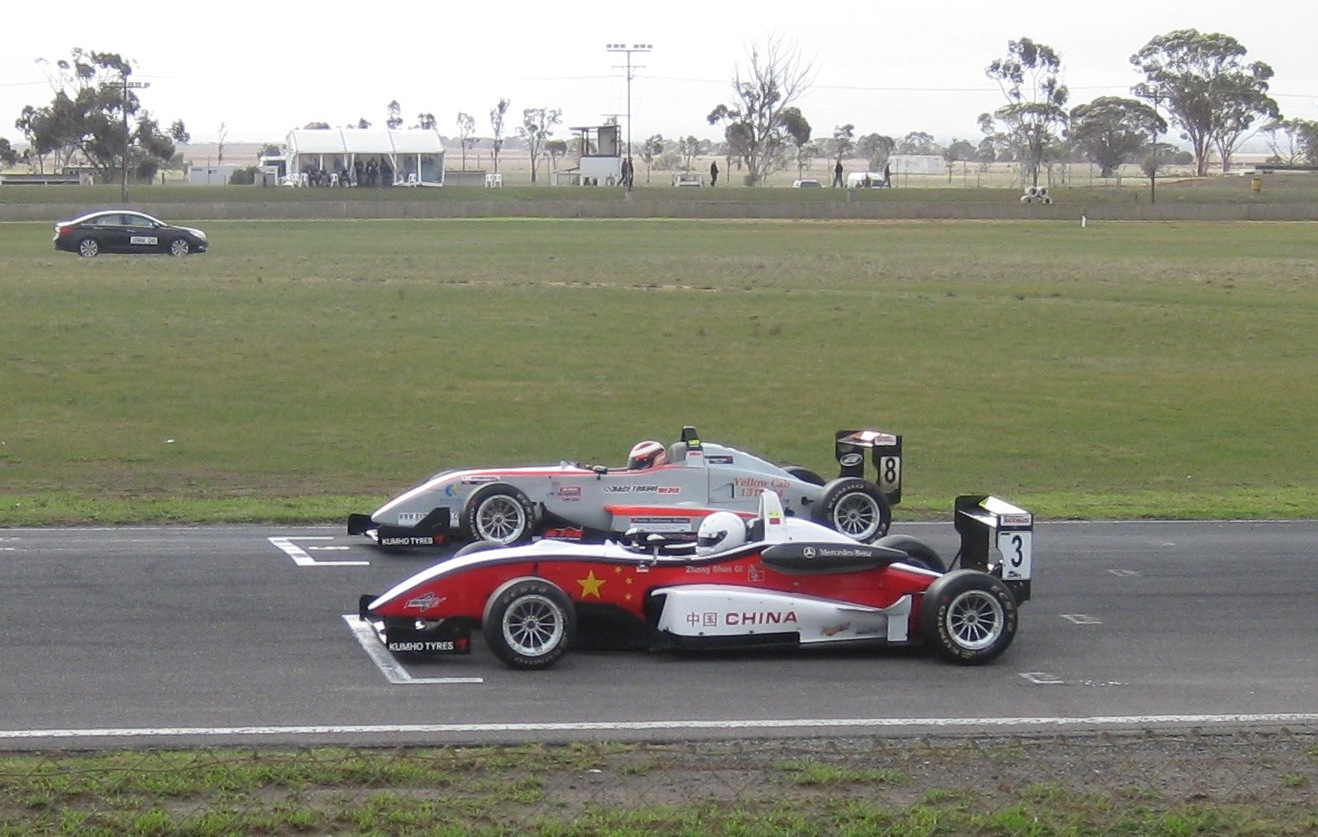
Zhang Shan Qi racing in Australian Formula 3.

Zhang Shan Qi took part in the 2009 and 2010 Australian Formula 3 Championships. In the 2009 season, he drove a part season for R-Tek Motorsport Services in the National A class. He finished 13th in class with eight points.

For the 2010 season, he moved to Team BRM and the Gold Star class. He finished the season in fourth place overall with 97 points. His best finishes in a race were fourth places at Mallala Motor Sport Park and Morgan Park Raceway.

== Intercontinental Le Mans Cup ==
In November 2010, he raced for Hope Polevision Racing in the Formula Le Mans category in the Intercontinental Le Mans Cup - 1000km of Zhuhai race. His team was the sole entry in the class and it won the class honours.

In May 2011, Zhang Shan Qi again wins the Formula Le Mans class with teammates Luca Moro and Nicolas Marroc of Hope Polevision Racing at the 1000km of Spa-Francorchamps.

In June 2011, Zhang Shan Qi also took part in the Ferrari Challenge APAC. He finished 13th overall and tenth in class in the first race at Zhuhai International Circuit due to a problem with his door, but performed strongly in race 2, he finished third overall and second in class.

In November 2011, Zhang Shan Qi would drive a Formula Le Mans car at Zhuhai International Circuit, at the final round of the ILMC again. He and teammate Chen Wai-Liang qualified 12th and finished in 17th place overall in the race.

== Half marathon ==
Zhang Shan Qi will enter the half-marathon to be held in December in Zhuhai.
