= 2011 Intercontinental Le Mans Cup =

- Organizer: Automobile Club de l'Ouest
- Discipline: Sports car endurance racing
- Number of races: 7

Champions
- LMP1 Manufacturer: (France) Peugeot
- GTE Manufacturer: (Italy) Ferrari
- LMP1 Team: (France) Peugeot Sport Total
- LMP2 Team: (France) Signatech Nissan
- LMGTE Pro Team: (Italy) AF Corse
- LMGTE Am Team: (France) Larbre Compétition

Intercontinental Le Mans Cup
- ← 2010 2012 →

The 2011 Intercontinental Le Mans Cup was the second and final Season running of the Automobile Club de l'Ouest's (ACO) Intercontinental Le Mans Cup, an international auto racing championship for manufacturers and teams. The Cup featured endurance races from the American Le Mans Series, Le Mans Series, and a stand-alone event in Zhuhai, China. Championships were held for Le Mans Prototype 1 (LMP1), Le Mans Prototype 2 (LMP2), Le Mans Grand Touring Endurance – Professional (LMGTE Pro) and Le Mans Grand Touring Endurance – Amateur (LMGTE Am) category cars.

== Schedule ==
On 29 November 2010, the ACO announced an initial 2011 calendar with seven events, expanding from just three in 2010. The most notable new addition was the 24 Hours of Le Mans which returned as a round of a championship series for the first time since the final World Sportscar Championship season in 1992. Double points were awarded for the event at Le Mans. The Sebring and Road Atlanta rounds were held in conjunction with the American Le Mans Series, while the Spa, Imola, and Silverstone rounds were shared with the Le Mans Series. Zhuhai was solely a round of the ILMC.

Rnd	Race	Circuit	Location	Date
1	12 Hours of Sebring	Sebring International Raceway	(United States) Sebring, Florida	19 March
2	1000 km of Spa-Francorchamps	Circuit de Spa-Francorchamps	(Belgium) Stavelot	7 May
3	24 Hours of Le Mans	Circuit de la Sarthe	(France) Le Mans	11–12 June
4	6 Hours of Imola	Autodromo Enzo e Dino Ferrari	(Italy) Imola	3 July
5	6 Hours of Silverstone	Silverstone Circuit	(United Kingdom) Silverstone	11 September
6	Petit Le Mans	Road Atlanta	(United States) Braselton, Georgia	1 October
7	6 Hours of Zhuhai	Zhuhai International Circuit	(China) Zhuhai	13 November

== Entries ==
Team	Car	Engine	Tyre	No.	Drivers	Rounds
LMP1
(Germany) Audi Sport Team Joest	Audi R15 TDI plus (only Rd #1); Audi R18 TDI	Audi TDI 5.5 L Turbo Diesel V10; Audi TDI 3.7 L Turbo Diesel V6	M	1	(Germany) Timo Bernhard	All
(Germany) Audi Sport Team Joest	Audi R15 TDI plus (only Rd #1); Audi R18 TDI	Audi TDI 5.5 L Turbo Diesel V10; Audi TDI 3.7 L Turbo Diesel V6	M	1	(France) Romain Dumas	1–3, 6
(Germany) Audi Sport Team Joest	Audi R15 TDI plus (only Rd #1); Audi R18 TDI	Audi TDI 5.5 L Turbo Diesel V10; Audi TDI 3.7 L Turbo Diesel V6	M	1	(Germany) Mike Rockenfeller	1–3
(Germany) Audi Sport Team Joest	Audi R15 TDI plus (only Rd #1); Audi R18 TDI	Audi TDI 5.5 L Turbo Diesel V10; Audi TDI 3.7 L Turbo Diesel V6	M	1	(Switzerland) Marcel Fässler	4–7
(Germany) Audi Sport Team Joest	Audi R15 TDI plus (only Rd #1); Audi R18 TDI	Audi TDI 5.5 L Turbo Diesel V10; Audi TDI 3.7 L Turbo Diesel V6	M	2	(Italy) Rinaldo Capello	1, 6
(Germany) Audi Sport Team Joest	Audi R15 TDI plus (only Rd #1); Audi R18 TDI	Audi TDI 5.5 L Turbo Diesel V10; Audi TDI 3.7 L Turbo Diesel V6	M	2	(Denmark) Tom Kristensen	1, 4–7
(Germany) Audi Sport Team Joest	Audi R15 TDI plus (only Rd #1); Audi R18 TDI	Audi TDI 5.5 L Turbo Diesel V10; Audi TDI 3.7 L Turbo Diesel V6	M	2	(United Kingdom) Allan McNish	1, 4–7
(Germany) Audi Sport Team Joest	Audi R15 TDI plus (only Rd #1); Audi R18 TDI	Audi TDI 5.5 L Turbo Diesel V10; Audi TDI 3.7 L Turbo Diesel V6	M	2	(Germany) André Lotterer	2–3
(Germany) Audi Sport Team Joest	Audi R15 TDI plus (only Rd #1); Audi R18 TDI	Audi TDI 5.5 L Turbo Diesel V10; Audi TDI 3.7 L Turbo Diesel V6	M	2	(France) Benoît Tréluyer	2–3
(Germany) Audi Sport Team Joest	Audi R15 TDI plus (only Rd #1); Audi R18 TDI	Audi TDI 5.5 L Turbo Diesel V10; Audi TDI 3.7 L Turbo Diesel V6	M	2	(Switzerland) Marcel Fässler	2–3
(United States) Audi Sport North America	Audi R18 TDI	Audi TDI 3.7 L Turbo Diesel V6	M	3	(Italy) Rinaldo Capello	2–3
(United States) Audi Sport North America	Audi R18 TDI	Audi TDI 3.7 L Turbo Diesel V6	M	3	(Denmark) Tom Kristensen	2–3
(United States) Audi Sport North America	Audi R18 TDI	Audi TDI 3.7 L Turbo Diesel V6	M	3	(United Kingdom) Allan McNish	2–3
(Switzerland) Hope Racing	Oreca 01	Swiss HyTech 2.0 L Turbo I4 Hybrid	M	5	(Switzerland) Steve Zacchia	3
(Switzerland) Hope Racing	Oreca 01	Swiss HyTech 2.0 L Turbo I4 Hybrid	M	5	(Netherlands) Jan Lammers	3
(Switzerland) Hope Racing	Oreca 01	Swiss HyTech 2.0 L Turbo I4 Hybrid	M	5	(Denmark) Casper Elgaard	3
(France) Peugeot Sport Total	Peugeot 908	Peugeot HDi 3.7 L Turbo Diesel V8	M	7	(Austria) Alexander Wurz	1–3
(France) Peugeot Sport Total	Peugeot 908	Peugeot HDi 3.7 L Turbo Diesel V8	M	7	(Spain) Marc Gené	1–3
(France) Peugeot Sport Total	Peugeot 908	Peugeot HDi 3.7 L Turbo Diesel V8	M	7	(United Kingdom) Anthony Davidson	1–4, 6–7
(France) Peugeot Sport Total	Peugeot 908	Peugeot HDi 3.7 L Turbo Diesel V8	M	7	(France) Sébastien Bourdais	4–7
(France) Peugeot Sport Total	Peugeot 908	Peugeot HDi 3.7 L Turbo Diesel V8	M	7	(France) Simon Pagenaud	5–6
(France) Peugeot Sport Total	Peugeot 908	Peugeot HDi 3.7 L Turbo Diesel V8	M	8	(France) Franck Montagny	All
(France) Peugeot Sport Total	Peugeot 908	Peugeot HDi 3.7 L Turbo Diesel V8	M	8	(France) Stéphane Sarrazin	All
(France) Peugeot Sport Total	Peugeot 908	Peugeot HDi 3.7 L Turbo Diesel V8	M	8	(Portugal) Pedro Lamy	1
(France) Peugeot Sport Total	Peugeot 908	Peugeot HDi 3.7 L Turbo Diesel V8	M	8	(France) Nicolas Minassian	2–3
(France) Peugeot Sport Total	Peugeot 908	Peugeot HDi 3.7 L Turbo Diesel V8	M	8	(Austria) Alexander Wurz	6
(France) Peugeot Sport Total; Team Peugeot Total	Peugeot 908	Peugeot HDi 3.7 L Turbo Diesel V8	M	9	(France) Sébastien Bourdais	2–3
(France) Peugeot Sport Total; Team Peugeot Total	Peugeot 908	Peugeot HDi 3.7 L Turbo Diesel V8	M	9	(Portugal) Pedro Lamy	2–3
(France) Peugeot Sport Total; Team Peugeot Total	Peugeot 908	Peugeot HDi 3.7 L Turbo Diesel V8	M	9	(France) Simon Pagenaud	2–3
(France) Team Oreca-Matmut	Peugeot 908 HDi FAP	Peugeot HDi 5.5 L Turbo Diesel V12	M	10	(France) Nicolas Lapierre	1–4, 6
(France) Team Oreca-Matmut	Peugeot 908 HDi FAP	Peugeot HDi 5.5 L Turbo Diesel V12	M	10	(France) Loïc Duval	1–4
(France) Team Oreca-Matmut	Peugeot 908 HDi FAP	Peugeot HDi 5.5 L Turbo Diesel V12	M	10	(France) Olivier Panis	1–4
(France) Team Oreca-Matmut	Peugeot 908 HDi FAP	Peugeot HDi 5.5 L Turbo Diesel V12	M	10	(Spain) Marc Gené	6
(France) Team Oreca-Matmut	Peugeot 908 HDi FAP	Peugeot HDi 5.5 L Turbo Diesel V12	M	10	(France) Nicolas Minassian	6
(Switzerland) Rebellion Racing	Lola B10/60	Toyota RV8KLM 3.4 L V8	M	12	(France) Nicolas Prost	All
(Switzerland) Rebellion Racing	Lola B10/60	Toyota RV8KLM 3.4 L V8	M	12	(Switzerland) Neel Jani	All
(Switzerland) Rebellion Racing	Lola B10/60	Toyota RV8KLM 3.4 L V8	M	12	(Netherlands) Jeroen Bleekemolen	1, 3
(Switzerland) Rebellion Racing	Lola B10/60	Toyota RV8KLM 3.4 L V8	M	12	(Italy) Andrea Belicchi	6
(France) OAK Racing	OAK Pescarolo 01	Judd DB 3.4 L V8	D	15	(France) Guillaume Moreau	All
(France) OAK Racing	OAK Pescarolo 01	Judd DB 3.4 L V8	D	15	(France) Pierre Ragues	All
(France) OAK Racing	OAK Pescarolo 01	Judd DB 3.4 L V8	D	15	(France) Matthieu Lahaye	1–3, 5–7
(France) OAK Racing	OAK Pescarolo 01	Judd DB 3.4 L V8	D	24	(France) Jacques Nicolet	1, 3–5, 7
(France) OAK Racing	OAK Pescarolo 01	Judd DB 3.4 L V8	D	24	(Monaco) Richard Hein	1, 3–4
(France) OAK Racing	OAK Pescarolo 01	Judd DB 3.4 L V8	D	24	(France) Jean-François Yvon	1, 3, 6
(France) OAK Racing	OAK Pescarolo 01	Judd DB 3.4 L V8	D	24	(France) Olivier Pla	5–7
(France) OAK Racing	OAK Pescarolo 01	Judd DB 3.4 L V8	D	24	(France) Alexandre Prémat	5–7
(United Kingdom) Aston Martin Racing	Aston Martin AMR-One (only rd#3); Lola-Aston Martin B09/60	Aston Martin 2.0 L Turbo I6; Aston Martin AM04 6.0 L V12	M	007	(Germany) Stefan Mücke	3, 6–7
(United Kingdom) Aston Martin Racing	Aston Martin AMR-One (only rd#3); Lola-Aston Martin B09/60	Aston Martin 2.0 L Turbo I6; Aston Martin AM04 6.0 L V12	M	007	(Austria) Christian Klien	3, 5
(United Kingdom) Aston Martin Racing	Aston Martin AMR-One (only rd#3); Lola-Aston Martin B09/60	Aston Martin 2.0 L Turbo I6; Aston Martin AM04 6.0 L V12	M	007	(United Kingdom) Darren Turner	3
(United Kingdom) Aston Martin Racing	Aston Martin AMR-One (only rd#3); Lola-Aston Martin B09/60	Aston Martin 2.0 L Turbo I6; Aston Martin AM04 6.0 L V12	M	007	(Mexico) Adrián Fernández	5–6
(United Kingdom) Aston Martin Racing	Aston Martin AMR-One (only rd#3); Lola-Aston Martin B09/60	Aston Martin 2.0 L Turbo I6; Aston Martin AM04 6.0 L V12	M	007	(Switzerland) Harold Primat	5–7
(United Kingdom) Aston Martin Racing	Aston Martin AMR-One (only rd#3); Lola-Aston Martin B09/60	Aston Martin 2.0 L Turbo I6; Aston Martin AM04 6.0 L V12	M	007	(United Kingdom) Andy Meyrick	7
LMP2
(France) Signatech Nissan	Oreca 03	Nissan VK45DE 4.5 L V8	D	26	(France) Franck Mailleux	All
(France) Signatech Nissan	Oreca 03	Nissan VK45DE 4.5 L V8	D	26	(Spain) Lucas Ordóñez	All
(France) Signatech Nissan	Oreca 03	Nissan VK45DE 4.5 L V8	D	26	(France) Soheil Ayari	1–4
(France) Signatech Nissan	Oreca 03	Nissan VK45DE 4.5 L V8	D	26	(France) Jean-Karl Vernay	5-7
(United States) Level 5 Motorsports	Lola B11/80	HPD HR28TT 2.8 L Turbo V6	M	33	(United States) Scott Tucker	1–4, 6
(United States) Level 5 Motorsports	Lola B11/80	HPD HR28TT 2.8 L Turbo V6	M	33	(France) Christophe Bouchut	1–4, 6
(United States) Level 5 Motorsports	Lola B11/80	HPD HR28TT 2.8 L Turbo V6	M	33	(Portugal) João Barbosa	1–4, 6
(France) OAK Racing	OAK Pescarolo 01	Judd-BMW HK 3.6 L V8	D	35	(France) Patrice Lafargue	All
(France) OAK Racing	OAK Pescarolo 01	Judd-BMW HK 3.6 L V8	D	35	(France) Frédéric Da Rocha	All
(France) OAK Racing	OAK Pescarolo 01	Judd-BMW HK 3.6 L V8	D	35	(Italy) Andrea Barlesi	1–4
(France) OAK Racing	OAK Pescarolo 01	Judd-BMW HK 3.6 L V8	D	35	(France) Jean-François Yvon	5
(France) OAK Racing	OAK Pescarolo 01	Judd-BMW HK 3.6 L V8	D	35	(France) Jacques Nicolet	6
LMGTE Pro
(Italy) AF Corse	Ferrari F430 GTE; Ferrari 458 Italia GT2	Ferrari F136 GT 4.0 L V8; Ferrari F136 4.5 L V8	M	51	(Italy) Giancarlo Fisichella	All
(Italy) AF Corse	Ferrari F430 GTE; Ferrari 458 Italia GT2	Ferrari F136 GT 4.0 L V8; Ferrari F136 4.5 L V8	M	51	(Italy) Gianmaria Bruni	All
(Italy) AF Corse	Ferrari F430 GTE; Ferrari 458 Italia GT2	Ferrari F136 GT 4.0 L V8; Ferrari F136 4.5 L V8	M	51	(Germany) Pierre Kaffer	1, 6
(Italy) AF Corse	Ferrari F430 GTE; Ferrari 458 Italia GT2	Ferrari F136 GT 4.0 L V8; Ferrari F136 4.5 L V8	M	51	(Finland) Toni Vilander	3
(Germany) BMW Motorsport	BMW M3 GT2	BMW S65B40 4.0 L V8	D	55	(Brazil) Augusto Farfus	All
(Germany) BMW Motorsport	BMW M3 GT2	BMW S65B40 4.0 L V8	D	55	(Germany) Dirk Werner	1, 3, 6
(Germany) BMW Motorsport	BMW M3 GT2	BMW S65B40 4.0 L V8	D	55	(United States) Bill Auberlen	1, 6
(Germany) BMW Motorsport	BMW M3 GT2	BMW S65B40 4.0 L V8	D	55	(Germany) Jörg Müller	2–5, 7
(Germany) BMW Motorsport	BMW M3 GT2	BMW S65B40 4.0 L V8	D	56	(United Kingdom) Andy Priaulx	1–3, 5–7
(Germany) BMW Motorsport	BMW M3 GT2	BMW S65B40 4.0 L V8	D	56	(Germany) Dirk Müller	1, 3, 6
(Germany) BMW Motorsport	BMW M3 GT2	BMW S65B40 4.0 L V8	D	56	(United States) Joey Hand	1, 3, 6
(Germany) BMW Motorsport	BMW M3 GT2	BMW S65B40 4.0 L V8	D	56	(Germany) Uwe Alzen	2, 5, 7
(Germany) BMW Motorsport	BMW M3 GT2	BMW S65B40 4.0 L V8	D	56	(Portugal) Pedro Lamy	4
(Germany) BMW Motorsport	BMW M3 GT2	BMW S65B40 4.0 L V8	D	56	(Germany) Dirk Werner	4
(France) Luxury Racing	Ferrari 458 Italia GT2	Ferrari F136 4.5 L V8	M	58	(France) François Jakubowski	2–6
(France) Luxury Racing	Ferrari 458 Italia GT2	Ferrari F136 4.5 L V8	M	58	(France) Anthony Beltoise	2–5, 7
(France) Luxury Racing	Ferrari 458 Italia GT2	Ferrari F136 4.5 L V8	M	58	(Republic of Ireland) Ralph Firman	4, 6–7
(France) Luxury Racing	Ferrari 458 Italia GT2	Ferrari F136 4.5 L V8	M	58	(Switzerland) Jean-Denis Délétraz	2
(France) Luxury Racing	Ferrari 458 Italia GT2	Ferrari F136 4.5 L V8	M	58	(France) Pierre Thiriet	3
(France) Luxury Racing	Ferrari 458 Italia GT2	Ferrari F136 4.5 L V8	M	58	(France) Nicolas Marroc	5
(France) Luxury Racing	Ferrari 458 Italia GT2	Ferrari F136 4.5 L V8	M	58	(France) David Hallyday	6
(France) Luxury Racing	Ferrari 458 Italia GT2	Ferrari F136 4.5 L V8	M	58	(Germany) Dominik Farnbacher	7
(France) Luxury Racing	Ferrari 458 Italia GT2	Ferrari F136 4.5 L V8	M	59	(Monaco) Stéphane Ortelli	All
(France) Luxury Racing	Ferrari 458 Italia GT2	Ferrari F136 4.5 L V8	M	59	(France) Frédéric Makowiecki	All
(France) Luxury Racing	Ferrari 458 Italia GT2	Ferrari F136 4.5 L V8	M	59	(Switzerland) Jean-Denis Délétraz	1
(France) Luxury Racing	Ferrari 458 Italia GT2	Ferrari F136 4.5 L V8	M	59	(Brazil) Jaime Melo	3
(France) Luxury Racing	Ferrari 458 Italia GT2	Ferrari F136 4.5 L V8	M	59	(France) Anthony Beltoise	6
(Austria) Lotus Jetalliance	Lotus Evora GTE	Toyota (Cosworth) 2GR-FE 4.0 L V6	M	64	(United Kingdom) Martin Rich	2–7
(Austria) Lotus Jetalliance	Lotus Evora GTE	Toyota (Cosworth) 2GR-FE 4.0 L V6	M	64	(Netherlands) Oskar Slingerland	2–4, 6–7
(Austria) Lotus Jetalliance	Lotus Evora GTE	Toyota (Cosworth) 2GR-FE 4.0 L V6	M	64	(United Kingdom) John Hartshorne	3
(Austria) Lotus Jetalliance	Lotus Evora GTE	Toyota (Cosworth) 2GR-FE 4.0 L V6	M	64	(Austria) Lukas Lichtner-Hoyer	4–5
(Austria) Lotus Jetalliance	Lotus Evora GTE	Toyota (Cosworth) 2GR-FE 4.0 L V6	M	64	(Denmark) David Heinemeier Hansson	5
(Austria) Lotus Jetalliance	Lotus Evora GTE	Toyota (Cosworth) 2GR-FE 4.0 L V6	M	64	(Denmark) Kasper Jensen	6
(Austria) Lotus Jetalliance	Lotus Evora GTE	Toyota (Cosworth) 2GR-FE 4.0 L V6	M	64	(Denmark) René Rasmussen	7
(Austria) Lotus Jetalliance	Lotus Evora GTE	Toyota (Cosworth) 2GR-FE 4.0 L V6	M	65	(United Kingdom) James Rossiter	2–7
(Austria) Lotus Jetalliance	Lotus Evora GTE	Toyota (Cosworth) 2GR-FE 4.0 L V6	M	65	(United Kingdom) Johnny Mowlem	2–7
(Austria) Lotus Jetalliance	Lotus Evora GTE	Toyota (Cosworth) 2GR-FE 4.0 L V6	M	65	(Switzerland) Jonathan Hirschi	2–4
(Austria) Lotus Jetalliance	Lotus Evora GTE	Toyota (Cosworth) 2GR-FE 4.0 L V6	M	65	(Austria) Karl Wendlinger	5
(Austria) Lotus Jetalliance	Lotus Evora GTE	Toyota (Cosworth) 2GR-FE 4.0 L V6	M	65	(Denmark) David Heinemeier Hansson	6–7
LMGTE Am
(France) Larbre Compétition	Chevrolet Corvette C6.R	Chevrolet LS5.5R 5.5 L V8	M	50	(France) Patrick Bornhauser	All
(France) Larbre Compétition	Chevrolet Corvette C6.R	Chevrolet LS5.5R 5.5 L V8	M	50	(France) Julien Canal	All
(France) Larbre Compétition	Chevrolet Corvette C6.R	Chevrolet LS5.5R 5.5 L V8	M	50	(Switzerland) Gabriele Gardel	1–6
(France) Larbre Compétition	Chevrolet Corvette C6.R	Chevrolet LS5.5R 5.5 L V8	M	50	(Monaco) Olivier Beretta	7
(United States) Krohn Racing	Ferrari F430 GTE	Ferrari F136 GT 4.0 L V8	D	57	(United States) Tracy Krohn	All
(United States) Krohn Racing	Ferrari F430 GTE	Ferrari F136 GT 4.0 L V8	D	57	(Sweden) Niclas Jönsson	All
(United States) Krohn Racing	Ferrari F430 GTE	Ferrari F136 GT 4.0 L V8	D	57	(Italy) Michele Rugolo	All
(United Arab Emirates) Gulf AMR Middle East	Aston Martin V8 Vantage GT2	Aston Martin AM05 4.5 L V8	D	60	(France) Fabien Giroix	All
(United Arab Emirates) Gulf AMR Middle East	Aston Martin V8 Vantage GT2	Aston Martin AM05 4.5 L V8	D	60	(Germany) Roald Goethe	All
(United Arab Emirates) Gulf AMR Middle East	Aston Martin V8 Vantage GT2	Aston Martin AM05 4.5 L V8	D	60	(United Kingdom) Michael Wainwright	1–6
(Italy) AF Corse	Ferrari F430 GTE	Ferrari F136 GT 4.0 L V8	M	61	(Italy) Marco Cioci	2–5, 7
(Italy) AF Corse	Ferrari F430 GTE	Ferrari F136 GT 4.0 L V8	M	61	(Italy) Piergiuseppe Perazzini	2–5
(Italy) AF Corse	Ferrari F430 GTE	Ferrari F136 GT 4.0 L V8	M	61	(Belgium) Stéphane Lémeret	2, 5
(Italy) AF Corse	Ferrari F430 GTE	Ferrari F136 GT 4.0 L V8	M	61	(Republic of Ireland) Seán Paul Breslin	3
(Italy) AF Corse	Ferrari F430 GTE	Ferrari F136 GT 4.0 L V8	M	61	(Portugal) Rui Águas	6
(Italy) AF Corse	Ferrari F430 GTE	Ferrari F136 GT 4.0 L V8	M	61	(United Kingdom) Justin Bell	6
(Italy) AF Corse	Ferrari F430 GTE	Ferrari F136 GT 4.0 L V8	M	61	(United States) Robert Kauffman	6
(Italy) AF Corse	Ferrari F430 GTE	Ferrari F136 GT 4.0 L V8	M	61	(Hong Kong) Philip Ma	7
(United Kingdom) CRS Racing	Ferrari F430 GTE	Ferrari F136 GT 4.0 L V8	M	62	(Germany) Pierre Ehret	1–5, 7
(United Kingdom) CRS Racing	Ferrari F430 GTE	Ferrari F136 GT 4.0 L V8	M	62	(New Zealand) Roger Wills	1–5, 7
(United Kingdom) CRS Racing	Ferrari F430 GTE	Ferrari F136 GT 4.0 L V8	M	62	(United Kingdom) Shaun Lynn	1–4
(United Kingdom) CRS Racing	Ferrari F430 GTE	Ferrari F136 GT 4.0 L V8	M	62	(United Kingdom) Tim Mullen	5, 7
(United Kingdom) CRS Racing	Ferrari F430 GTE	Ferrari F136 GT 4.0 L V8	M	62	(Brazil) Raphael Matos	6
(United Kingdom) CRS Racing	Ferrari F430 GTE	Ferrari F136 GT 4.0 L V8	M	62	(Brazil) Jaime Melo	6
(United Kingdom) CRS Racing	Ferrari F430 GTE	Ferrari F136 GT 4.0 L V8	M	62	(Finland) Toni Vilander	6
(Germany) Proton Competition	Porsche 911 GT3-RSR	Porsche M97/74 4.0 L Flat-6	M	63	(Germany) Christian Ried	1–4, 6-7
(Germany) Proton Competition	Porsche 911 GT3-RSR	Porsche M97/74 4.0 L Flat-6	M	63	(Italy) Gianluca Roda	1, 4–5, 7
(Germany) Proton Competition	Porsche 911 GT3-RSR	Porsche M97/74 4.0 L Flat-6	M	63	(Austria) Richard Lietz	1, 6-7
(Germany) Proton Competition	Porsche 911 GT3-RSR	Porsche M97/74 4.0 L Flat-6	M	63	(Netherlands) Niek Hommerson	2
(Germany) Proton Competition	Porsche 911 GT3-RSR	Porsche M97/74 4.0 L Flat-6	M	63	(Austria) Horst Felbermayr Sr.	3
(Germany) Proton Competition	Porsche 911 GT3-RSR	Porsche M97/74 4.0 L Flat-6	M	63	(United States) Patrick Long	4–5
(Germany) Proton Competition	Porsche 911 GT3-RSR	Porsche M97/74 4.0 L Flat-6	M	63	(United States) Mark Bullitt	6

== Results and standings ==
=== Race results ===
Note that for each individual races, cars not competing in the Intercontinental Cup may have won their respective class. However, only the highest finishing Cup entrant is listed below.

Overall winners in bold.

2011 ILMC individual race results
Rd.	Circuit		LMP1 Winners	LMP2 Winners	LM GTE Pro Winners	LM GTE Am Winners
1	(United States)	Sebring (Report)	(France) **No. 10 Team Oreca Matmut**	(France) No. 26 Signatech Nissan (Note: Second in class in the race.)	(Germany) No. 56 BMW Motorsport	(United States) No. 57 Krohn Racing
1	(United States)	Sebring (Report)	(France) **Nicolas Lapierre** (France) **Loïc Duval** (France) **Olivier Panis**	(France) Franck Mailleux (France) Soheil Ayari (Spain) Lucas Ordóñez	(Germany) Dirk Müller (United States) Joey Hand (United Kingdom) Andy Priaulx	(United States) Tracy Krohn (Sweden) Niclas Jönsson (Italy) Michele Rugolo
2	(Belgium)	Spa-Francorchamps (Report)	(France) **No. 7 Peugeot Sport Total**	(France) No. 26 Signatech Nissan (Note: Fifth in class in the race.)	(Italy) No. 51 AF Corse	(Italy) No. 61 AF Corse (Note: Second in class in the race.)
2	(Belgium)	Spa-Francorchamps (Report)	(Austria) **Alexander Wurz** (United Kingdom) **Anthony Davidson** (Spain) **Marc Gené**	(France) Franck Mailleux (France) Soheil Ayari (Spain) Lucas Ordóñez	(Italy) Giancarlo Fisichella (Italy) Gianmaria Bruni	(Italy) Piergiuseppe Perazzini (Italy) Marco Cioci (Belgium) Stéphane Lémeret
3	(France)	Le Mans (Report)	(Germany) **No. 2 Audi Sport Team Joest**	(France) No. 26 Signatech Nissan (Note: Second in class in the race.)	(Italy) No. 51 AF Corse (Note: Second in class in the race.)	(France) No. 50 Larbre Compétition
3	(France)	Le Mans (Report)	(Switzerland) **Marcel Fässler** (Germany) **André Lotterer** (France) **Benoît Tréluyer**	(France) Franck Mailleux (France) Soheil Ayari (Spain) Lucas Ordóñez	(Italy) Giancarlo Fisichella (Italy) Gianmaria Bruni (Finland) Toni Vilander	(France) Patrick Bornhauser (France) Julien Canal (Switzerland) Gabriele Gardel
4	(Italy)	Imola (Report)	(France) **No. 7 Peugeot Sport Total**	(France) No. 26 Signatech Nissan (Note: Second in class in the race.)	(Italy) No. 51 AF Corse (Note: Second in class in the race.)	(France) No. 50 Larbre Compétition (Note: Second in class in the race.)
4	(Italy)	Imola (Report)	(France) **Sébastien Bourdais** (United Kingdom) **Anthony Davidson**	(France) Franck Mailleux (France) Soheil Ayari (Spain) Lucas Ordóñez	(Italy) Giancarlo Fisichella (Italy) Gianmaria Bruni	(France) Patrick Bornhauser (France) Julien Canal (Switzerland) Gabriele Gardel
5	(United Kingdom)	Silverstone (Report)	(France) **No. 7 Peugeot Sport Total**	(France) No. 35 OAK Racing (Note: Sixth in class in the race.)	(Italy) No. 51 AF Corse	(Germany) No. 63 Proton Competition (Note: Second in class in the race.)
5	(United Kingdom)	Silverstone (Report)	(France) **Sébastien Bourdais** (France) **Simon Pagenaud**	(France) Frédéric Da Rocha (France) Patrice Lafargue (France) Jean-François Yvon	(Italy) Giancarlo Fisichella (Italy) Gianmaria Bruni	(United States) Patrick Long (Italy) Gianluca Roda
6	(United States)	Road Atlanta (Report)	(France) **No. 8 Peugeot Sport Total**	(United States) No. 33 Level 5 Motorsports	(Italy) No. 51 AF Corse	(United States) No. 57 Krohn Racing
6	(United States)	Road Atlanta (Report)	(France) **Franck Montagny** (France) **Stéphane Sarrazin** (Austria) **Alexander Wurz**	(United States) Scott Tucker (France) Christophe Bouchut (Portugal) João Barbosa	(Italy) Giancarlo Fisichella (Italy) Gianmaria Bruni (Germany) Pierre Kaffer	(United States) Tracy Krohn (Sweden) Niclas Jönsson (Italy) Michele Rugolo
7	(China)	Zhuhai (Report)	(France) **No. 7 Peugeot Sport Total**	(France) No. 26 Signatech Nissan	(Germany) No. 55 BMW Motorsport	(Germany) No. 63 Proton Competition
7	(China)	Zhuhai (Report)	(France) **Sébastien Bourdais** (United Kingdom) **Anthony Davidson**	(France) Franck Mailleux (France) Jean-Karl Vernay (Spain) Lucas Ordóñez	(Germany) Jörg Müller (Brazil) Augusto Farfus	(Germany) Christian Ried (Italy) Gianluca Roda (Austria) Richard Lietz

=== Scoring system ===
The cup's scoring system was revamped for 2011, changing the point structure, how many cars could obtain points, and adding more bonus point opportunities. Each car had the opportunity to score from one to fifteen points for their position within their class plus an additional point for being the fastest qualifier in their class (pole-sitter) and an additional one or two bonus points for meeting special engine use conditions.

Points were awarded to cars based on their final classification within their class for each event, including both ILMC entries and other race entries. Thus, it was possible for first-place (or any other position) points to not be awarded if that position in the race was achieved by a non-ILMC entry. Cars which were not classified per the rules of the event, or which did not complete at least 70% of the distance completed by the winner of their class, received zero points for their finishing position. All cars which were classified, but finished beyond 12th place in their class, received a single point. For manufacturers, points were awarded to the top two finishing cars of each manufacturer in each event, but for teams this was reduced to only their top finisher. Position points were doubled for the 24 Hours of Le Mans event.

Bonus points were expanded in 2011. The pole-sitter bonus was retained, with a single point being awarded for qualifying fastest in class for each event. As with position points, this included all entrants in the event, so the entrant needed to outpace not only all ILMC entries, but all non-ILMC entries in their class as well to obtain the bonus point. 2011 also saw up to two additional bonus points made available to LMGTE manufacturers and teams in the form of an engine bonus. Engines were tightly controlled by the organizers, and their running time was tracked (including practice, qualifying, and race hours). For engines which accumulated 15 or more hours by the end of a race, the entrant would receive a bonus point. A second point was available if the engine reached 30 hours by the end of a race. Cars had to be classified finishers to obtain the engine bonus, but would still get the pole-sitter bonus even if they did not complete the race. Engine bonus points were not awarded for the 24 Hours of Le Mans event.

Point System	Points awarded for position												Bonus points	
Point System	1st	2nd	3rd	4th	5th	6th	7th	8th	9th	10th	11th	12th +	Pole	Engine
24H Le Mans	30	26	22	18	16	14	12	10	8	6	4	2	1	none
Other races	15	13	11	9	8	7	6	5	4	3	2	1	1	1 or 2

=== Manufacturers' Cups ===
Peugeot and Audi returned to the competition competing for the premier title of LMP1 manufacturer, both bringing new cars. Peugeot was able to continue their success from 2010, winning all but one race and outscoring Audi in every event. Audi was unable to use their new R18 in the first event, and while the new car would be quick enough to win the pole at two events and pick up the make's only win of the season at the prestigious 24 Hours of Le Mans, it would ultimately prove unable to pace the Peugeots over the balance of the season and Audi was not able to be competitive in the standings as a result.

The change in class arrangement for 2011 meant that both LMGTE Pro and LMGTE Am classes were combined into a single cup for manufacturers, as they both used the same cars. Points for position were awarded based on the cars' ranking among all LMGTE cars, both professional and amateur. Ferrari, which equipped five of the ten customer teams, took the championship after a season-long battle with BMW, which had to rely solely on the success of its factory team. BMW started and ended the season with one-two victories, but it was not enough to overcome the Ferraris. Porsche and Chevrolet both had strong seasons, but their LMGTE Am teams could not keep pace with the Pro teams and they never were a significant threat to Ferrari or BMW. The Corvettes highlighted their season with a victory at the 24 Hours of Le Mans.

Full 2011 ILMC Manufacturer Cup Standings
Pos.	Manufacturer		Results							Points	
Pos.	Manufacturer		(United States) SEB	(Belgium) SPA	(France) LMS	(Italy) IMO	(United Kingdom) SIL	(United States) ATL	(China) ZHU	Eng.	Total
LMP1
1	(France)	Peugeot	1	1	2	**1**	**1**	**1**	**1**		211
1	(France)	Peugeot	**3**	2	3	2	8	2	2		211
2	(Germany)	Audi	4	3	**1**	3	2	Ret	3		119
2	(Germany)	Audi	5	**4**	Ret	4	7	Ret	Ret		119
LMGTE
1	(Italy)	Ferrari	**5**	1	2	1	1	**1**	3	8	211
1	(Italy)	Ferrari	9	8	11	2	2	7	6	8	211
2	(Germany)	BMW	1	3	**3**	**3**	**4**	3	**1**	6	152
2	(Germany)	BMW	2	4	Ret	13	6	9	2	6	152
3	(Germany)	Porsche	6	10	18	4	3	2	4	6	114
3	(Germany)	Porsche	12		6	5	5	5		6	114
4	(United States)	Chevrolet	3	9	1	7	15	4	5	4	95
4	(United States)	Chevrolet	4		7			13		4	95
5	(United Kingdom)	Aston Martin	Ret	5	Ret	10	12	16	8		18
5	(United Kingdom)	Aston Martin		Ret	Ret		20				18
6	(United Kingdom)	Lotus		17	5	Ret	19	NC	9	1	15
6	(United Kingdom)	Lotus		Ret	Ret	Ret	NC	Ret	NC	1	15

Key
Gold	Winner
Silver	2nd place
Bronze	3rd place
Green	Points finish
Blue	Non-classified finish (NC)
Purple	Retired (Ret)
Black	Disqualified (DSQ)
White	Did not start (DNS)
Blank	Did not participate (DNP)
**Bold text**	Class pole winner

=== Team Cups ===
2011 saw the team cups for all four classes hotly contested. Peugeot's factory team was able to retain the LMP1 title. Audi's Joest team was able to briefly take the lead in the standings after their victory at the 24 Hours of Le Mans, which netted double points, but the Peugeot Sport Total team would run the table for the rest of the season, not only winning every race, but even gathering the pole-sitter bonus points for each one as well. Aston Martin's new AMR-One car proved to be a failure, and the team's late-season return with the Lola B09/60 was too late to make an impact. Oreca won the season opening round, and performed well in other races, but did not compete in all rounds. Non-manufacturer LMP1 teams were well off of the pace of the manufacturer-supported teams and despite season-long participation were not able to challenge for the cup. The LMP2 cup was essentially a battle between Signatech and OAK Racing, with Level 5 Motorsports failing to compete season-long. AF Corse carried its 2010 GT2 class success forward into the new LMGTE Pro class against a strong effort by the BMW Motorsport team, while Larbre's Corvette performed well through the season netting the team the cup in the LMGTE Am class against several competitors.

Several teams changed the type of car they ran during the Cup. Audi Sport Team Joest started the season with the older Audi R15 TDI plus (powered by an Audi TDI 5.5 L Turbo V10 diesel engine), while in the LMGTE Pro class, AF Corse entered the first event with a Ferrari F430 GTE. In both cases, the teams switched to their new car for the second event. Aston Martin Racing had intended to run their troubled Aston Martin AMR-One car in the LMP1 class, but extended testing prevented it entering the first two events. After its unsuccessful debut at Le Mans, the fourth round at Imola was skipped as well and ultimately, the team would switch to the older Lola-Aston Martin B09/60 for to run the final three rounds.

Full 2011 ILMC Team Cup Standings
Pos.	Team		Results (key)							Points
Pos.	Team		(United States) SEB	(Belgium) SPA	(France) LMS	(Italy) IMO	(United Kingdom) SIL	(United States) ATL	(China) ZHU	Points
LMP1
1	(France)	Peugeot Sport Total	**3**	1	3	**1**	**1**	**1**	**1**	113
2	(Germany)	Audi Sport Team Joest	4	**4**	**1**	3	2	NC	3	85
3	(Switzerland)	Rebellion Racing	7	7	6	6	Ret	5	4	50
4	(France)	Team Oreca Matmut	1	10	5			2		47
5	(France)	OAK Racing	Ret	DNS	Ret	8	3	4	5	33
6	(United Kingdom)	Aston Martin Racing			Ret		9	3	6	22
7	(Switzerland)	Hope Racing			Ret					0
LMP2
1	(France)	Signatech Nissan	**2**	5	**2**	2	7	3	**1**	95
2	(France)	OAK Racing	3	6	7	9	6	4	2	63
3	(United States)	Level 5 Motorsports	4	Ret	3	3		1		57
LMGTE PRO
1	(Italy)	AF Corse	**5**	**1**	2	2	1	**1**	**5**	108
2	(Germany)	BMW Motorsport	1	3	**3**	**3**	**4**	3	**1**	101
3	(France)	Luxury Racing	9	Ret	Ret	Ret	2	7	3	38
4	(Austria)	Lotus Jetalliance		9	7	Ret	14	Ret	4	27
LMGTE AM
1	(France)	Larbre Compétition	Ret	3	1	2	4	2	2	93
2	(United States)	Krohn Racing	1	8	Ret	6	7	1	3	62
3	(Germany)	Proton Competition	**2**	4	Ret	DSQ	2	Ret	1	52
4	(United Kingdom)	CRS Racing	Ret	6	Ret	4	3	5	4	50
5	(Italy)	AF Corse		2	**Ret**	3	5	**3**	Ret	47
6	(United Arab Emirates)	Gulf AMR Middle East	Ret	Ret	Ret		8	4	5	22

Key
Gold	Winner
Silver	2nd place
Bronze	3rd place
Green	Points finish
Blue	Non-classified finish (NC)
Purple	Retired (Ret)
Black	Disqualified (DSQ)
White	Did not start (DNS)
Blank	Did not participate (DNP)
**Bold text**	Class pole winner
