= 2011 6 Hours of Zhuhai =

The Track map of Zhuhai International Circuit

The 2011 6 Hours of Zhuhai was a sports car racing event held at the Zhuhai International Circuit on November 13, 2011. It was the seventh and final round of the 2011 Intercontinental Le Mans Cup.

== Qualifying ==
=== Qualifying result ===
Pole position winners in each class are marked in bold.

| Pos | Class | Team | Driver | Lap Time | Grid |
|---|---|---|---|---|---|
| 1 | **LMP1** | **#7 Peugeot Sport Total** | **Anthony Davidson** | **1:21.769** | **1** |
| 2 | LMP1 | #8 Peugeot Sport Total | Stéphane Sarrazin | 1:21.844 | 2 |
| 3 | LMP1 | #2 Audi Sport Team Joest | Tom Kristensen | 1:22.038 | 3 |
| 4 | LMP1 | #1 Audi Sport Team Joest | Marcel Fässler | 1:22.538 | 4 |
| 5 | LMP1 | #12 Rebellion Racing | Neel Jani | 1:23.931 | 5 |
| 6 | LMP1 | #24 OAK Racing | Olivier Pla | 1:24.684 | 6 |
| 7 | LMP1 | #007 Aston Martin Racing | Stefan Mücke | 1:25.119 | 7 |
| 8 | LMP1 | #15 OAK Racing | Matthieu Lahaye | 1:25.170 | 8 |
| 9 | **LMP2** | **#26 Signatech Nissan** | **Franck Mailleux** | **1:27.929** | **9** |
| 10 | LMP2 | #35 OAK Racing | Patrice Lafargue | 1:30.214 | 10 |
| 11 | LMP1 | #23 Tokai University YGK Power | Mitsuyama Shogo | 1:30.614 | 11 |
| 12 | **FLM** | **#90 PTRS Racing** | **Zhang Shan Qi** | **1:33.783** | **12** |
| 13 | **GTE-Pro** | **#55 BMW Motorsport** | **Jörg Müller** | **1:34.506** | **13** |
| 14 | **GTC** | **#98 Audi Sport C Racing** | **Edoardo Mortara** | **1:34.777** | **14** |
| 15 | GTC | #94 Hitotsuyama Racing | Carlo Van Dam | 1:34.934 | 15 |
| 16 | GTE-Pro | #51 AF Corse | Gianmaria Bruni | 1:34.945 | 16 |
| 17 | GTE-Pro | #56 BMW Motorsport | Andy Priaulx | 1:34.992 | 17 |
| 18 | **GTE-Am** | **#62 CRS Racing** | **Tim Mullen** | **1:35.229** | **18** |
| 19 | GTE-Am | #63 Proton Competition | Richard Lietz | 1:35.279 | 19 |
| 20 | GTC | #96 Team AMG | Mika Häkkinen | 1:35.296 | 20 |
| 21 | GTE-Pro | #59 Luxury Racing | Frédéric Makowiecki | 1:35.413 | 21 |
| 22 | GTE-Am | #57 Krohn Racing | Niclas Jönsson | 1:35.598 | 22 |
| 23 | GTE-Am | #50 Larbre Compétition | Julien Canal | 1:35.639 | 23 |
| 24 | GTE-Pro | #58 Luxury Racing | Anthony Beltoise | 1:35.867 | 24 |
| 25 | GTE-Am | #60 Gulf AMR Middle East | Fabien Giroix | 1:36.081 | 25 |
| 26 | GTE-Am | #61 AF Corse | Philip Ma | 1:36.111 | 26 |
| 27 | GTC | #97 Audi Race Experience | Florian Gruber | 1:36.417 | 27 |
| 28 | GTE-Pro | #65 Lotus Jetalliance | James Rossiter | 1:36.618 | 29 |
| 29 | GTE-Pro | #64 Lotus Jetalliance | Martin Rich | 1:38.622 | 28 |

== Race result ==
Class winners in bold. Cars failing to complete 70% of winner's distance marked as Not Classified (NC).

| Pos | Class | No | Team | Drivers | Chassis | Tyre | Laps |
| Pos | Class | No | Team | Drivers | Engine | Tyre | Laps |
|---|---|---|---|---|---|---|---|
| 1 | **LMP1** | **7** | **(France) Peugeot Sport Total** | **(France) Sébastien Bourdais (United Kingdom) Anthony Davidson** | **Peugeot 908** | MI | **249** |
| 1 | **LMP1** | **7** | **(France) Peugeot Sport Total** | **(France) Sébastien Bourdais (United Kingdom) Anthony Davidson** | **Peugeot HDi 3.7 L V8 (Diesel)** | MI | **249** |
| 2 | LMP1 | 8 | (France) Peugeot Sport Total | (France) Franck Montagny (France) Stéphane Sarrazin | Peugeot 908 | MI | 249 |
| 2 | LMP1 | 8 | (France) Peugeot Sport Total | (France) Franck Montagny (France) Stéphane Sarrazin | Peugeot HDi 3.7 L V8 (Diesel) | MI | 249 |
| 3 | LMP1 | 1 | (Germany) Audi Sport Team Joest | (Germany) Timo Bernhard (Switzerland) Marcel Fässler | Audi R18 TDI | MI | 248 |
| 3 | LMP1 | 1 | (Germany) Audi Sport Team Joest | (Germany) Timo Bernhard (Switzerland) Marcel Fässler | Audi TDI 3.7 L Turbo V6 (Diesel) | MI | 248 |
| 4 | LMP1 | 12 | (Switzerland) Rebellion Racing | (Switzerland) Neel Jani (France) Nicolas Prost | Lola B10/60 | MI | 242 |
| 4 | LMP1 | 12 | (Switzerland) Rebellion Racing | (Switzerland) Neel Jani (France) Nicolas Prost | Toyota RV8KLM 3.4 L V8 | MI | 242 |
| 5 | LMP1 | 24 | (France) OAK Racing | (France) Jacques Nicolet (France) Olivier Pla (France) Alexandre Prémat | OAK Pescarolo 01 | D | 240 |
| 5 | LMP1 | 24 | (France) OAK Racing | (France) Jacques Nicolet (France) Olivier Pla (France) Alexandre Prémat | Judd DB 3.4 L V8 | D | 240 |
| 6 | LMP1 | 007 | (United Kingdom) Aston Martin Racing | (United Kingdom) Andy Meyrick (Germany) Stefan Mücke (Switzerland) Harold Primat | Lola-Aston Martin B09/60 | MI | 239 |
| 6 | LMP1 | 007 | (United Kingdom) Aston Martin Racing | (United Kingdom) Andy Meyrick (Germany) Stefan Mücke (Switzerland) Harold Primat | Aston Martin 6.0 L V12 | MI | 239 |
| 7 | LMP1 | 15 | (France) OAK Racing | (France) Matthieu Lahaye (France) Guillaume Moreau (France) Pierre Ragues | OAK Pescarolo 01 | D | 238 |
| 7 | LMP1 | 15 | (France) OAK Racing | (France) Matthieu Lahaye (France) Guillaume Moreau (France) Pierre Ragues | Judd DB 3.4 L V8 | D | 238 |
| 8 | **LMP2** | **26** | **(France) Signatech Nissan** | **(France) Franck Mailleux (Spain) Lucas Ordoñez (France) Jean-Karl Vernay** | **Oreca 03** | MI | **228** |
| 8 | **LMP2** | **26** | **(France) Signatech Nissan** | **(France) Franck Mailleux (Spain) Lucas Ordoñez (France) Jean-Karl Vernay** | **Nissan VK45DE 4.5 L V8** | MI | **228** |
| 9 | **GTE; Pro** | **55** | **(Germany) BMW Motorsport** | **(Brazil) Augusto Farfus (Germany) Jörg Müller** | **BMW M3 GT2** | D | **221** |
| 9 | **GTE; Pro** | **55** | **(Germany) BMW Motorsport** | **(Brazil) Augusto Farfus (Germany) Jörg Müller** | **BMW 4.0 L V8** | D | **221** |
| 10 | GTE; Pro | 56 | (Germany) BMW Motorsport | (United Kingdom) Andy Priaulx (Germany) Uwe Alzen | BMW M3 GT2 | D | 220 |
| 10 | GTE; Pro | 56 | (Germany) BMW Motorsport | (United Kingdom) Andy Priaulx (Germany) Uwe Alzen | BMW 4.0 L V8 | D | 220 |
| 11 | GTE; Pro | 59 | (France) Luxury Racing | (France) Frédéric Makowiecki (Monaco) Stéphane Ortelli | Ferrari 458 Italia GT2 | MI | 218 |
| 11 | GTE; Pro | 59 | (France) Luxury Racing | (France) Frédéric Makowiecki (Monaco) Stéphane Ortelli | Ferrari 4.5 L V8 | MI | 218 |
| 12 | **GTE; Am** | **63** | **(Germany) Proton Competition** | **(Austria) Richard Lietz (Germany) Christian Ried (Italy) Gianluca Roda** | **Porsche 997 GT3-RSR** | MI | **217** |
| 12 | **GTE; Am** | **63** | **(Germany) Proton Competition** | **(Austria) Richard Lietz (Germany) Christian Ried (Italy) Gianluca Roda** | **Porsche 4.0 L Flat-6** | MI | **217** |
| 13 | GTE; Am | 50 | (France) Larbre Compétition | (Monaco) Olivier Beretta; Patrick Bornhauser (France) Julien Canal | Corvette C6.R | MI | 216 |
| 13 | GTE; Am | 50 | (France) Larbre Compétition | (Monaco) Olivier Beretta; Patrick Bornhauser (France) Julien Canal | Chevrolet 5.5 L V8 | MI | 216 |
| 14 | GTE; Am | 57 | (United States) Krohn Racing | (Sweden) Niclas Jönsson (United States) Tracy Krohn (Italy) Michele Rugolo | Ferrari F430 GTE | D | 215 |
| 14 | GTE; Am | 57 | (United States) Krohn Racing | (Sweden) Niclas Jönsson (United States) Tracy Krohn (Italy) Michele Rugolo | Ferrari 4.0 L V8 | D | 215 |
| 15 | GTE; Am | 62 | (United Kingdom) CRS Racing | (Germany) Pierre Ehret (United Kingdom) Tim Mullen (New Zealand) Roger Wills | Ferrari F430 GTE | MI | 215 |
| 15 | GTE; Am | 62 | (United Kingdom) CRS Racing | (Germany) Pierre Ehret (United Kingdom) Tim Mullen (New Zealand) Roger Wills | Ferrari 4.0 L V8 | MI | 215 |
| 16 | LMP2 | 35 | (France) OAK Racing | (France) Frédéric Da Rocha (France) Patrice Lafargue | OAK Pescarolo 01 | D | 213 |
| 16 | LMP2 | 35 | (France) OAK Racing | (France) Frédéric Da Rocha (France) Patrice Lafargue | Judd-BMW HK 3.6 L V8 | D | 213 |
| 17 | **FLM** | **90** | **(China) PTRS Racing** | **(China) Zhang Shan Qi (Taiwan) Chen Wei Liang** | **Oreca FLM09** | MI | **213** |
| 17 | **FLM** | **90** | **(China) PTRS Racing** | **(China) Zhang Shan Qi (Taiwan) Chen Wei Liang** | **Chevrolet LS3 6.2 L V8** | MI | **213** |
| 18 | **GTC** | **98** | **(China) Audi Sport C Racing** | **(Italy) Edoardo Mortara (Hong Kong) Darryl O'Young (Switzerland) Alexandre Imperatori** | **Audi R8 LMS** | MI | **210** |
| 18 | **GTC** | **98** | **(China) Audi Sport C Racing** | **(Italy) Edoardo Mortara (Hong Kong) Darryl O'Young (Switzerland) Alexandre Imperatori** | **Audi 5.2 L V10** | MI | **210** |
| 19 | GTC | 97 | (China) Audi Race Experience | (Taiwan) Jeffrey Lee (Germany) Florian Grüber (Hong Kong) Hing Tak Mak | Audi R8 LMS | MI | 203 |
| 19 | GTC | 97 | (China) Audi Race Experience | (Taiwan) Jeffrey Lee (Germany) Florian Grüber (Hong Kong) Hing Tak Mak | Audi 5.2 L V10 | MI | 203 |
| 20 | GTE; Am | 60 | (United Arab Emirates) Gulf AMR Middle East | (France) Fabien Giroix (Germany) Roald Goethe | Aston Martin V8 Vantage GT2 | D | 198 |
| 20 | GTE; Am | 60 | (United Arab Emirates) Gulf AMR Middle East | (France) Fabien Giroix (Germany) Roald Goethe | Aston Martin 4.5 L V8 | D | 198 |
| 21 | GTE; Pro | 64 | (Austria) Lotus Jetalliance | (Netherlands) Oskar Slingerland (United Kingdom) Martin Rich (Denmark) Rene Rasmussen | Lotus Evora GTE | MI | 194 |
| 21 | GTE; Pro | 64 | (Austria) Lotus Jetalliance | (Netherlands) Oskar Slingerland (United Kingdom) Martin Rich (Denmark) Rene Rasmussen | Toyota-Cosworth 4.0 L V6 | MI | 194 |
| 22 | LMP1 | 23 | (Japan) Tokai University YGK Power | (Japan) Mitsuyama Shogo (Japan) Yokomizo Naoki | Courage-Oreca LC70 | Y | 187 |
| 22 | LMP1 | 23 | (Japan) Tokai University YGK Power | (Japan) Mitsuyama Shogo (Japan) Yokomizo Naoki | YGK YR40T 4.0 L Turbo V8 (Hybrid) | Y | 187 |
| 23 | GTE; Pro | 51 | (Italy) AF Corse | (Italy) Gianmaria Bruni (Italy) Giancarlo Fisichella | Ferrari 458 Italia GT2 | MI | 186 |
| 23 | GTE; Pro | 51 | (Italy) AF Corse | (Italy) Gianmaria Bruni (Italy) Giancarlo Fisichella | Ferrari 4.5 L V8 | MI | 186 |
| NC | GTC | 94 | (Japan) Hitotsuyama Racing | (Japan) Akihiro Tsuzuki (United States) Michael Kim (Netherlands) Carlo Van Dam | Audi R8 LMS | Y | 169 |
| NC | GTC | 94 | (Japan) Hitotsuyama Racing | (Japan) Akihiro Tsuzuki (United States) Michael Kim (Netherlands) Carlo Van Dam | Audi 5.2 L V10 | Y | 169 |
| NC | GTE; Pro | 65 | (Austria) Lotus Jetalliance | (Denmark) David Heinemeier Hansson (United Kingdom) Johnny Mowlem (United Kingdom) James Rossiter | Lotus Evora GTE | MI | 163 |
| NC | GTE; Pro | 65 | (Austria) Lotus Jetalliance | (Denmark) David Heinemeier Hansson (United Kingdom) Johnny Mowlem (United Kingdom) James Rossiter | Toyota-Cosworth 4.0 L V6 | MI | 163 |
| DNF | LMP1 | 2 | (Germany) Audi Sport Team Joest | (Denmark) Tom Kristensen (United Kingdom) Allan McNish | Audi R18 TDI | MI | 139 |
| DNF | LMP1 | 2 | (Germany) Audi Sport Team Joest | (Denmark) Tom Kristensen (United Kingdom) Allan McNish | Audi TDI 3.7 L Turbo V6 (Diesel) | MI | 139 |
| DNF | GTE; Pro | 58 | (France) Luxury Racing | (France) Anthony Beltoise (Germany) Dominik Farnbacher (Republic of Ireland) Ralph Firman | Ferrari 458 Italia GT2 | MI | 110 |
| DNF | GTE; Pro | 58 | (France) Luxury Racing | (France) Anthony Beltoise (Germany) Dominik Farnbacher (Republic of Ireland) Ralph Firman | Ferrari 4.5 L V8 | MI | 110 |
| DNF | GTC | 96 | (Germany) Team AMG | (Germany) Lance David Arnold (China) Cheng Congfu (Finland) Mika Häkkinen | Mercedes-Benz SLS AMG GT3 | MI | 73 |
| DNF | GTC | 96 | (Germany) Team AMG | (Germany) Lance David Arnold (China) Cheng Congfu (Finland) Mika Häkkinen | Mercedes-Benz 6.2 L V8 | MI | 73 |
| DNF | GTE; Am | 61 | (Italy) AF Corse | (Italy) Marco Cioci (Hong Kong) Philip Ma | Ferrari F430 GTE | MI | 22 |
| DNF | GTE; Am | 61 | (Italy) AF Corse | (Italy) Marco Cioci (Hong Kong) Philip Ma | Ferrari 4.0 L V8 | MI | 22 |

Intercontinental Le Mans Cup
| Previous race: Petit Le Mans | 2011 season | Next race: none |
