= Christian Ried =

German racing driver

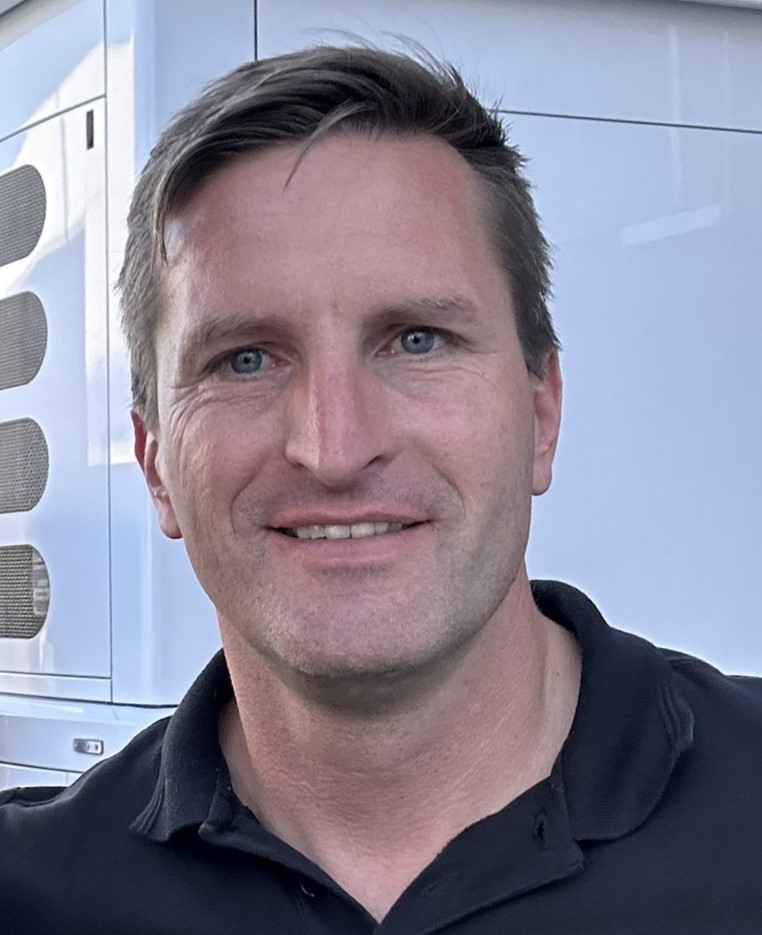
- Ried in 2023
- Nationality: (Germany) German
- Born: 24 February 1979 (age 47) Schöneberg, West Berlin, West Germany

FIA World Endurance Championship career
- Debut season: 1996
- Current team: Iron Lynx
- Categorisation: FIA Silver (until 2013); FIA Bronze (2014–)
- Car number: 61
- Starts: 88
- Wins: 13

Previous series
- 2012-2023, 2025 2007-2011, 2013, 2015-2023 1999-2006: FIA World Endurance Championship European Le Mans Series; FIA GT Championship

Championship titles
- 2020, 2022: European Le Mans Series – LMGTE class

Christian Ried (born 24 February 1979) is a German former racing driver and the team principal of Proton Competition. He last competed in the FIA World Endurance Championship, racing for Iron Lynx in the No. 61 Mercedes-AMG GT3.

== Career ==
Ried's father Gerold founded Proton Competition in 1996, the team which Christian has spent most of his career racing for, beginning with the FIA GT Championship in 1999. As of 2021, Christian was team owner, facilitating the team's move to the WeatherTech SportsCar Championship alongside WeatherTech Racing in 2021. Ried ran his first 24 Hours of Le Mans in 2006, driving in the GT2 class for Sebah Automotive Ltd. He returned in 2011, driving for Proton Competition, and scored his first podium in 2014, finishing second in the GTE Am class. Four years later, Ried collected his first victory at the famous race, winning the GTE Am class alongside co-drivers Matt Campbell and Julien Andlauer. Two years later, Ried finished runner-up once again, this time with Riccardo Pera replacing Andlauer in the driver lineup. That same year, Ried won the European Le Mans Series championship in the GTE class on countback, after ending level on points with Kessel Racing.

In 2017 and 2018, Ried won the Porsche Cup, an award handed out to a non-factory driver who has most successfully piloted a Porsche over the course of the season.

Ried is the only driver to have competed in every race of the first decade of the FIA World Endurance Championship, spanning from 2012 to 2022. Following the 2023 season, after 85 consecutive races and 13 class victories in the championship, Ried announced his retirement from professional racing, electing to focus on the management of Proton Competition and his children's racing careers. Ultimately, Ried returned to the championship for a one-off drive at Interlagos in 2024, replacing full-season Bronze-ranked driver Giorgio Roda. Due to Proton Competition's transition to Ford machinery in 2024, Ried's unscheduled appearance marked his first WEC start in a non-Porsche entry.

For 2025, Ried would return to racing, doing the first two rounds for Italian team Iron Lynx in their first season as a Mercedes-AMG customer team. He would step back after the 6 Hours of Imola, citing his inability to combine racing activities with his duties as a team principal. Ried was replaced for the remainder of the season by Australian racer Martin Berry, starting from the 6 Hours of Spa.

== Personal life ==
Ried's son Jonas, is currently competing in the European Le Mans Series. His other son Lenny is currently competing in F4 Spanish Championship for Monlau Motorsport.

== Racing record ==
=== Racing career summary ===
Season	Series	Team	Races	Wins	Poles	F/Laps	Podiums	Points	Position
1996	Global GT Championship	Proton Competition	10	0	0	0	0	6	126th
1999	FIA GT Championship - GT	Proton Competition	8	0	0	0	0	0	NC
2000	FIA GT Championship - GT	Proton Competition	9	0	0	0	0	0	NC
2000	American Le Mans Series - GTS	Proton Competition	1	0	0	0	0	22	29th
2001	FIA GT Championship - GT	Proton Competition	8	0	0	0	0	0	NC
2001	Grand American Rolex Series - GTS	Proton Competition	1	0	0	0	0	26	42nd
2002	FIA GT Championship - GT	Proton Competition	6	0	0	0	0	1	35th
2003	FIA GT Championship - GT	Proton Competition	3	0	0	0	0	0	NC
2003	FIA GT Championship - N-GT	Proton Competition	7	0	0	0	0	1	45th
2004	FIA GT Championship - N-GT	Proton Competition	11	0	0	0	1	44	5th
2005	FIA GT Championship - GT2	Proton Competition	10	0	0	0	1	44	5th
2006	FIA GT Championship - GT2	Team Felbermayr-Proton	10	0	0	0	0	25.5	11th
2006	24 Hours of Le Mans - GT2	Sebah Automotive Ltd.	1	0	0	0	0	N/A	DNF
2007	Le Mans Series - GT2	Team Felbermayr-Proton	6	0	0	0	0	10	13th
2008	Le Mans Series - GT2	Team Felbermayr-Proton	5	0	0	0	1	10	14th
2008	24H Series - A6	Proton Competition	1	0	0	0	0	0	30th
2009	Asian Le Mans Series - GT2	Team Felbermayr-Proton	2	0	0	0	1	13	**3rd**
2009	Le Mans Series - GT2	Team Felbermayr-Proton	5	0	0	0	0	5	16th
2010	Le Mans Series - GT2	Team Felbermayr-Proton	5	0	0	0	1	55	**3rd**
2011	Le Mans Series - LMGTE Am	Team Felbermayr-Proton	5	1	0	0	2	35	5th
2011	Intercontinental Le Mans Cup - LMGTE Am	Proton Competition	7	1	0	0	2	N/A	N/A
2011	24 Hours of Le Mans - LMGTE Am	Proton Competition	1	0	0	0	0	N/A	DNF
2011	American Le Mans Series - GT	Proton Competition	1	0	0	0	0	0	NC†
2012	FIA World Endurance Championship - LMGTE Am	Team Felbermayr-Proton	8	3	0	0	7	5.5	38th
2012	24 Hours of Le Mans - LMGTE Am	Team Felbermayr-Proton	1	0	0	0	0	N/A	DNF
2013	FIA World Endurance Championship - LMGTE Am	Proton Competition	8	0	0	0	2	76.5	6th
2013	24 Hours of Le Mans - LMGTE Am	Proton Competition	1	0	0	0	0	N/A	8th
2013	European Le Mans Series - LMGTE	Proton Competition	5	2	0	0	3	80	**2nd**
2013	French GT Championship	Autorlando	2	0	0	0	0	0	NC†
2014	FIA World Endurance Championship - LMGTE Am	Proton Competition	8	0	0	0	2	121	4th
2014	24 Hours of Le Mans - LMGTE Am	Proton Competition	1	0	0	0	1	N/A	**2nd**
2014	French GT Championship	Team Martinet - Alméras	2	0	0	0	0	0	NC†
2015	FIA World Endurance Championship - LMGTE Am	Abu Dhabi-Proton Racing	7	0	0	0	1	79	8th
2015	FIA World Endurance Championship - LMGTE Am	Dempsey-Proton Racing	1	0	0	0	1	79	8th
2015	24 Hours of Le Mans - LMGTE Am	Abu Dhabi-Proton Racing	1	0	0	0	0	N/A	DNF
2015	European Le Mans Series - LMGTE	Proton Competition	5	0	0	0	1	55	6th
2015–16	Asian Le Mans Series - GT	KCMG	2	2	0	0	2	52	**2nd**
2016	FIA World Endurance Championship - LMGTE Am	KCMG	9	0	0	0	5	121	5th
2016	24 Hours of Le Mans - LMGTE Am	KCMG	1	0	0	0	0	N/A	10th
2016	European Le Mans Series - GTE	Proton Competition	6	0	0	0	1	60	7th
2017	FIA World Endurance Championship - LMGTE Am	Dempsey-Proton Racing	9	2	0	0	6	168	**2nd**
2017	24 Hours of Le Mans - LMGTE Am	Dempsey-Proton Racing	1	0	0	0	0	N/A	6th
2017	European Le Mans Series - LMGTE	Proton Competition	6	1	0	0	2	80	**3rd**
2018	European Le Mans Series - LMGTE	Proton Competition	6	1	0	0	2	83	4th
2018	24 Hours of Le Mans - LMGTE Am	Dempsey-Proton Racing	1	1	0	0	1	N/A	**1st**
2018–19	FIA World Endurance Championship - LMGTE Am	Dempsey-Proton Racing	8	5	0	0	5	110	**2nd**
2019	24 Hours of Le Mans - LMGTE Am	Dempsey-Proton Racing	1	0	0	0	0	N/A	4th
2019	European Le Mans Series - LMGTE Am	Dempsey-Proton Racing	6	1	0	0	3	76	**2nd**
2019–20	FIA World Endurance Championship - LMGTE Am	Dempsey-Proton Racing	8	0	0	0	2	107.5	5th
2020	24 Hours of Le Mans - LMGTE Am	Dempsey-Proton Racing	1	0	0	0	1	N/A	**2nd**
2020	European Le Mans Series - LMGTE	Dempsey-Proton Racing	5	2	0	0	4	99	**1st**
2020	24H GT Series - GTX	Proton Competition	0	0	0	0	0	0	7th
2021	FIA World Endurance Championship - LMGTE Am	Dempsey-Proton Racing	6	0	0	0	2	79	**3rd**
2021	24 Hours of Le Mans - LMGTE Am	Dempsey-Proton Racing	1	0	0	0	0	N/A	5th
2021	European Le Mans Series - LMGTE	Proton Competition	6	0	0	0	1	57	7th
2022	FIA World Endurance Championship - LMGTE Am	Dempsey-Proton Racing	6	2	1	0	2	83	6th
2022	24 Hours of Le Mans - LMGTE Am	Dempsey-Proton Racing	1	0	1	0	0	N/A	14th
2022	European Le Mans Series - LMGTE	Proton Competition	6	2	0	0	3	82	**1st**
2023	FIA World Endurance Championship - LMGTE Am	Dempsey-Proton Racing	7	1	0	0	2	80	4th
2023	24 Hours of Le Mans - LMGTE Am	Dempsey-Proton Racing	1	0	0	0	0	N/A	DNF
2023	European Le Mans Series - LMGTE	Proton Competition	6	2	1	0	3	85	**2nd**
2024	FIA World Endurance Championship - LMGT3	Proton Competition	2	0	0	0	0	0	28th
2025	FIA World Endurance Championship - LMGT3	Iron Lynx	2	0	0	0	0	0	29th
2025	European Le Mans Series - LMGT3	Proton Competition	2	0	0	0	0	14	17th
2026–27	Asian Le Mans Series - GT3	Proton Competition							

† As Ried was a guest driver, he was ineligible to score championship points.

=== Complete FIA GT Championship results ===
(key) (Races in bold indicate pole position; races in italics indicate fastest lap)

Year	Team	Car	Class	1	2	3	4	5	6	7	8	9	10	11	Rank	Points
1999	Proton Competition	Porsche 911 GT2	GT2	MNZ; Ret	SIL; 10	HOC; 18†	HUN; Ret	ZOL; 8	OSC; Ret	DON; 10	HOM	GLN	ZHU; 8		NC	0
2000	Proton Competition	Porsche 911 GT2	GT	VAL; 17	EST; 26	MNZ; 13	SIL; Ret	HUN; 11	ZOL; 16	A1R; Ret	LAU; 19	BRN; 17	MAG; Ret		NC	0
2001	Proton Competition	Porsche 911 GT2	GT	MNZ; Ret	BRN; 26	MAG; Ret	SIL; 22	ZOL; Ret	HUN	SPA	A1R; NC	NÜR; DNS	JAR; 18	EST; 20	NC	0
2002	Proton Competition	Porsche 911 GT2	GT	MAG	SIL	BRN	JAR; 10	AND; 11	OSC; 8	SPA; Ret	PER; Ret	DON; 6	EST; 12		28th	1
2003	Proton Competition	Porsche 911 GT2	GT	CAT; 19	MAG; Ret	PER; Ret									NC	0
2003	Proton Competition	Porsche 911 GT3-RS	N-GT				BRN; 9	DON; 10	SPA; Ret	AND; 9	OSC; 13	EST; Ret	MNZ; 8		45th	1
2004	Proton Competition	Porsche 911 GT3-RS	N-GT	MNZ; 3	VAL; 5	MAG; 4	HOC; 4	BRN; 5	DON; 8	SPA; 5	IMO; 7	OSC; 5	DUB; 7	ZHU; 5	5th	44
2005	Proton Competition	Porsche 911 GT3-RS	GT2	MNZ; 6	MAG; 9	SIL; 5	IMO; 4	BRN; 4	SPA; 3	OSC; 3	IST; 4	ZHU; Ret	DUB; 4	BHR	5th	44
2006	Team Felbermayr-Proton	Porsche 911 GT3-RS	GT2	SIL; 4	BRN; 7	OSC; 7	SPA; 5	PRI; Ret	DIJ; 4	MUG; 6	HUN; 6	ADR; Ret	DUB; 8		11th	25.5

=== Complete European Le Mans Series results ===
(key) (Races in bold indicate pole position; results in italics indicate fastest lap)

Year	Entrant	Class	Chassis	Engine	1	2	3	4	5	6	Rank	Points
2007	Team Felbermayr-Proton	GT2	Porsche 997 GT3-RSR	Porsche 3.8 L Flat-6	MNZ; Ret	VAL; 5	NÜR; 13	SPA; 7	SIL; Ret	INT; 8	16th	7
2008	Team Felbermayr-Proton	GT2	Porsche 997 GT3-RSR	Porsche 3.8 L Flat-6	CAT; 9	MNZ; Ret	SPA; 3	NÜR; 9	SIL; 5		15th	10
2009	Team Felbermayr-Proton	GT2	Porsche 997 GT3-RSR	Porsche 4.0 L Flat-6	CAT; 7	SPA; 11	ALG; Ret	NÜR; 7	SIL; 8		16th	5
2010	Team Felbermayr-Proton	GT2	Porsche 997 GT3-RSR	Porsche 4.0 L Flat-6	LEC; 2	SPA; 8	ALG; 5	HUN; 7	SIL; 10		3rd	55
2011	Team Felbermayr-Proton	LMGTE Am	Porsche 997 GT3-RSR	Porsche 4.0 L Flat-6	LEC; 1	SPA	IMO; NC	SIL; 6	EST; 3		5th	35
2013	Proton Competition	LMGTE	Porsche 997 GT3-RSR	Porsche 4.0 L Flat-6	SIL; 1	IMO; 5	RBR; 8	HUN; 1	LEC; 3		2nd	80
2015	Proton Competition	LMGTE	Porsche 911 RSR	Porsche 4.0 L Flat-6	SIL; 5	IMO; 2	RBR; 5	LEC; 4	**EST**; 8		6th	55
2016	Proton Competition	LMGTE	Porsche 911 RSR	Porsche 4.0 L Flat-6	SIL; 6	IMO; 4	**RBR**; 5	LEC; Ret	SPA; 2	**EST**; 5	7th	60
2017	Proton Competition	LMGTE	Porsche 911 RSR	Porsche 4.0 L Flat-6	SIL; 2	MNZ; 5	RBR; 5	LEC; 6	**SPA**; 6	ALG; 1	3rd	80
2018	Proton Competition	LMGTE	Porsche 911 RSR	Porsche 4.0 L Flat-6	LEC; 5	MNZ; 2	RBR; 4	**SIL**; 4	SPA; 5	ALG; 1	4th	83
2019	Dempsey-Proton Racing	LMGTE	Porsche 911 RSR	Porsche 4.0 L Flat-6	LEC; 3	**MNZ**; 1	CAT; 6	SIL; 7	**SPA**; 2	**ALG**; Ret	2nd	76
2020	Proton Competition	LMGTE	Porsche 911 RSR	Porsche 4.0 L Flat-6	LEC; 1	SPA; 6	**LEC**; 2	MNZ; 2	ALG; 1		1st	99
2021	WeatherTech Racing	LMGTE	Porsche 911 RSR-19	Porsche 4.2 L Flat-6	**CAT**; 2	RBR; 6	LEC; 4	MNZ; 9	SPA; 7	ALG; 5	6th	57
2022	Proton Competition	LMGTE	Porsche 911 RSR-19	Porsche 4.2 L Flat-6	LEC; 2	IMO; Ret	**MNZ**; 2	CAT; 1	SPA; 9	ALG; 5	1st	82
2023	Proton Competition	LMGTE	Porsche 911 RSR-19	Porsche 4.2 L Flat-6	CAT; Ret	**LEC**; 1	ARA; 4	SPA; 8	PRT; 1	ALG; 2	2nd	85
2025	Proton Competition	LMGT3	Porsche 911 GT3 R (992)	Porsche 4.2 L Flat-6	CAT	LEC; 8	IMO; 5	SPA	SIL	ALG	17th	14

=== Complete Intercontinental Le Mans Cup results ===
(key) (Races in bold indicate pole position; races in italics indicate fastest lap)

Year	Entrant	Class	Chassis	Engine	1	2	3	4	5	6	7	Rank	Points
2011	Proton Competition	LMGTE Am	Porsche 997 GT3-RSR	Porsche 4.0 L Flat-6	**SEB**; 2	SPA; 4	LMS; Ret	IMO; DSQ	SIL; 2	PET; Ret	ZHU; 1		

=== Complete FIA World Endurance Championship results ===
(key) (Races in bold indicate pole position; races in italics indicate fastest lap)

Year	Entrant	Class	Chassis	Engine	1	2	3	4	5	6	7	8	9	Rank	Points
2012	Team Felbermayr-Proton	LMGTE Am	Porsche 997 GT3-RSR	Porsche 4.0 L Flat-6	SEB; 1	SPA; 1	LMS; Ret	**SIL**; 2	SÃO; 1	BHR; 1	FUJ; 3	**SHA**; 2		38th	5.5
2013	Proton Competition	LMGTE Am	Porsche 997 GT3-RSR	Porsche 4.0 L Flat-6	SIL; 5	SPA; 5	LMS; 5	SÃO; 3	COA; 5	FUJ; 3	SHA; 4	BHR; Ret		6th	76.5
2014	Proton Competition	LMGTE Am	Porsche 911 RSR	Porsche 4.0 L Flat-6	SIL; 4	SPA; 4	LMS; 2	COA; 3	FUJ; 4	SHA; 5	BHR; 4	SÃO; 4		4th	121
2015	Abu Dhabi-Proton Racing	LMGTE Am	Porsche 911 RSR	Porsche 4.0 L Flat-6	SIL; 5	SPA; 4	LMS; Ret	NÜR; 6	COA; 2	FUJ; 5	SHA; 7			8th	79
2015	Dempsey-Proton Racing	LMGTE Am	Porsche 911 RSR	Porsche 4.0 L Flat-6								BHR; 3		8th	79
2016	KCMG	LMGTE Am	Porsche 911 RSR	Porsche 4.0 L Flat-6	SIL; 4	SPA; 4	LMS; 6	NÜR; DSQ	MEX; 3	COA; 2	FUJ; 3	SHA; 3	BHR; 2	5th	121
2017	Dempsey-Proton Racing	LMGTE Am	Porsche 911 RSR	Porsche 4.0 L Flat-6	SIL; 3	SPA; 2	LMS; 3	NÜR; 1	**MEX**; 1	COA; 4	FUJ; 3	SHA; 3	BHR; 4	2nd	168
2018–19	Dempsey-Proton Racing	LMGTE Am	Porsche 911 RSR	Porsche 4.0 L Flat-6	**SPA**; 4	LMS; 1	SIL; 1	FUJ; DSQ	SHA; 1	**SEB**; 1	SPA; 1	LMS; 2		2nd	110
2019–20	Dempsey-Proton Racing	LMGTE Am	Porsche 911 RSR	Porsche 4.0 L Flat-6	SIL; 5	FUJ; 5	SHA; 11	BHR; 6	COA; 5	**SPA**; 2	**LMS**; 2	BHR; 7		5th	107.5
2021	Dempsey-Proton Racing	LMGTE Am	Porsche 911 RSR-19	Porsche 4.2 L Flat-6	SPA; Ret	POR; Ret	MON; 5	LMS; 4	BHR; 2	BHR; 2				3rd	79
2022	Dempsey-Proton Racing	LMGTE Am	Porsche 911 RSR-19	Porsche 4.2 L Flat-6	SEB; 4	SPA; 1	**LMS**; 8	MON; 1	FUJ; Ret	BHR; 8				6th	83
2023	Dempsey-Proton	LMGTE Am	Porsche 911 RSR-19	Porsche 4.2 L Flat-6	SEB; 2	PRT; 7	SPA; 9	LMS; Ret	MON; 1	FUJ; 6	BHR; 6			4th	80
2024	Proton Competition	LMGT3	Ford Mustang GT3	Ford Coyote 5.4 L V8	QAT	IMO	SPA	LMS	SÃO; 13	COA	FUJ; 16	BHR		28th	0
2025	Iron Lynx	LMGT3	Mercedes-AMG GT3 Evo	Mercedes-AMG M159 6.2 L V8	QAT; Ret	IMO; 13	SPA	LMS	SÃO	COA	FUJ	BHR		29th	0

^{*} Season still in progress.

=== Complete 24 Hours of Le Mans results ===
Year	Team	Co-Drivers	Car	Class	Laps	Pos.	Class Pos.
2006	(United Kingdom) Sebah Automotive Ltd.	(France) Xavier Pompidou (Denmark) Thorkild Thyrring	Porsche 911 GT3-RSR	GT2	256	DNF	DNF
2011	(Germany) Proton Competition	(Austria) Horst Felbermayr (Austria) Horst Felbermayr Jr.	Porsche 997 GT3-RSR	GTE; Am	199	DNF	DNF
2012	(Germany) Team Felbermayr-Proton	(Italy) Gianluca Roda (Italy) Paolo Ruberti	Porsche 997 GT3-RSR	GTE; Am	222	DNF	DNF
2013	(Germany) Proton Competition	(Italy) Gianluca Roda (Italy) Paolo Ruberti	Porsche 997 GT3-RSR	GTE; Am	300	35th	8th
2014	(Germany) Proton Competition	(United Arab Emirates) Khaled Al Qubaisi (Austria) Klaus Bachler	Porsche 911 RSR	GTE; Am	300	21st	**2nd**
2015	(Germany) Abu Dhabi-Proton Racing	(United Arab Emirates) Khaled Al Qubaisi (Austria) Klaus Bachler	Porsche 911 RSR	GTE; Am	44	DNF	DNF
2016	(Hong Kong) KCMG	(Switzerland) Joël Camathias (Germany) Wolf Henzler	Porsche 911 RSR	GTE; Am	300	41st	10th
2017	(Germany) Dempsey-Proton Racing	(Italy) Matteo Cairoli (Germany) Marvin Dienst	Porsche 911 RSR	GTE; Am	329	34th	6th
2018	(Germany) Dempsey-Proton Racing	(France) Julien Andlauer (Australia) Matt Campbell	Porsche 911 RSR	GTE; Am	335	25th	**1st**
2019	(Germany) Dempsey-Proton Racing	(France) Julien Andlauer (Australia) Matt Campbell	Porsche 911 RSR	GTE; Am	332	34th	4th
2020	(Germany) Dempsey-Proton Racing	(Australia) Matt Campbell (Italy) Riccardo Pera	Porsche 911 RSR	GTE; Am	339	25th	**2nd**
2021	(Germany) Dempsey-Proton Racing	(Australia) Matt Campbell (New Zealand) Jaxon Evans	Porsche 911 RSR-19	GTE; Am	335	31st	5th
2022	(Germany) Dempsey-Proton Racing	(United Kingdom) Sebastian Priaulx (United Kingdom) Harry Tincknell	Porsche 911 RSR-19	GTE; Am	336	47th	14th
2023	(Germany) Dempsey-Proton Racing	(France) Julien Andlauer (Denmark) Mikkel O. Pedersen	Porsche 911 RSR-19	GTE; Am	118	DNF	DNF

Sporting positions
Preceded by Alessandro Pier Guidi; Nicklas Nielsen; Fabien Lavergne	European Le Mans Series; LMGTE Champion; 2020; With: Alessio Picariello & Michele Beretta	Succeeded by Miguel Molina; Matteo Cressoni; Rino Mastronardi
Preceded by Miguel Molina; Matteo Cressoni; Rino Mastronardi	European Le Mans Series; LMGTE Champion; 2022; With: Gianmaria Bruni & Lorenzo Ferrari	Succeeded by Ryan Hardwick; Alessio Picariello; Zacharie Robichon
