= 2005 FIA GT Zhuhai Supercar 500 =

The Track map of Zhuhai International Circuit

The 2005 FIA GT Zhuhai Supercar 500 was the ninth race for the 2005 FIA GT Championship season. It took place on 23 October 2005 at Zhuhai.

== Official results ==
Class winners in bold. Cars failing to complete 70% of winner's distance marked as Not Classified (NC).

Pos	Class	No	Team	Drivers	Chassis	Tyre	Laps
Pos	Class	No	Team	Drivers	Engine	Tyre	Laps
1	**GT1**	**6**	**(Belgium) GLPK-Carsport**	**(Belgium) Bert Longin (Belgium) Anthony Kumpen; Mike Hezemans**	**Chevrolet Corvette C5-R**	MI	**110**
1	**GT1**	**6**	**(Belgium) GLPK-Carsport**	**(Belgium) Bert Longin (Belgium) Anthony Kumpen; Mike Hezemans**	**Chevrolet LS7r 7.0L V8**	MI	**110**
2	GT1	11	(France) Larbre Compétition	(Switzerland) Gabriele Gardel (Portugal) Pedro Lamy	Ferrari 550-GTS Maranello	MI	110
2	GT1	11	(France) Larbre Compétition	(Switzerland) Gabriele Gardel (Portugal) Pedro Lamy	Ferrari 5.9L V12	MI	110
3	GT1	9	(Germany) Vitaphone Racing Team	(Germany) Michael Bartels (Germany) Timo Scheider	Maserati MC12 GT1	P	110
3	GT1	9	(Germany) Vitaphone Racing Team	(Germany) Michael Bartels (Germany) Timo Scheider	Maserati 6.0L V12	P	110
4	GT1	10	(Germany) Vitaphone Racing Team	(Italy) Fabio Babini (Italy) Thomas Biagi	Maserati MC12 GT1	P	110
4	GT1	10	(Germany) Vitaphone Racing Team	(Italy) Fabio Babini (Italy) Thomas Biagi	Maserati 6.0L V12	P	110
5	GT1	2	(Italy) GPC Sport	(Switzerland) Jean-Denis Délétraz (Italy) Andrea Piccini	Ferrari 575-GTC Maranello	P	109
5	GT1	2	(Italy) GPC Sport	(Switzerland) Jean-Denis Délétraz (Italy) Andrea Piccini	Ferrari 6.0L V12	P	109
6	GT1	15	(Monaco) JMB Racing	(Italy) Andrea Bertolini (Austria) Karl Wendlinger	Maserati MC12 GT1	P	109
6	GT1	15	(Monaco) JMB Racing	(Italy) Andrea Bertolini (Austria) Karl Wendlinger	Maserati 6.0L V12	P	109
7	**GT2**	**66**	**(United Kingdom) GruppeM Racing**	**(Germany) Marc Lieb (Germany) Mike Rockenfeller**	**Porsche 911 GT3-RSR**	MI	**107**
7	**GT2**	**66**	**(United Kingdom) GruppeM Racing**	**(Germany) Marc Lieb (Germany) Mike Rockenfeller**	**Porsche 3.6L Flat-6**	MI	**107**
8	GT2	88	(United Kingdom) GruppeM Racing	(United Kingdom) Tim Sugden (France) Emmanuel Collard	Porsche 911 GT3-RSR	MI	106
8	GT2	88	(United Kingdom) GruppeM Racing	(United Kingdom) Tim Sugden (France) Emmanuel Collard	Porsche 3.6L Flat-6	MI	106
9	GT2	74	(Italy) Ebimotors	(Italy) Luigi Moccia (Italy) Cristian Passutti	Porsche 911 GT3-RSR	D	104
9	GT2	74	(Italy) Ebimotors	(Italy) Luigi Moccia (Italy) Cristian Passutti	Porsche 3.6L Flat-6	D	104
10	GT2	68	(Hong Kong) Noble Group/GruppeM	(United Kingdom) Matthew Marsh (Hong Kong) Darryl O'Young	Porsche 911 GT3-RSR	MI	103
10	GT2	68	(Hong Kong) Noble Group/GruppeM	(United Kingdom) Matthew Marsh (Hong Kong) Darryl O'Young	Porsche 3.6L Flat-6	MI	103
11	GT2	90	(Netherlands) Spyker Squadron	(Netherlands) Duncan Huisman (Netherlands) Menno Kuus	Spyker C8 Spyder GT2R	D	102
11	GT2	90	(Netherlands) Spyker Squadron	(Netherlands) Duncan Huisman (Netherlands) Menno Kuus	Audi 3.8L V8	D	102
12	GT2	57	(Slovakia) Autoracing Club Bratislava	(Slovakia) Miro Konopka (Slovakia) Štefan Rosina	Porsche 911 GT3-RSR	D	100
12	GT2	57	(Slovakia) Autoracing Club Bratislava	(Slovakia) Miro Konopka (Slovakia) Štefan Rosina	Porsche 3.6L Flat-6	D	100
13	**G2**	**105**	**(Belgium) Belgian Racing**	**(Belgium) Vanina Ickx (Belgium) Bas Leinders**	**Gillet Vertigo Streiff**	D	**97**
13	**G2**	**105**	**(Belgium) Belgian Racing**	**(Belgium) Vanina Ickx (Belgium) Bas Leinders**	**Alfa Romeo 3.6L V6**	D	**97**
14	G2	110	(Malaysia) Amprex Motorsports	(Malaysia) Tengku Djan Ley (Australia) Paul Stokell	Lotus Exige 300RR	D	96
14	G2	110	(Malaysia) Amprex Motorsports	(Malaysia) Tengku Djan Ley (Australia) Paul Stokell	Opel Ecotec 3.0L V6	D	96
15	GT2	56	(Czech Republic) Czech National Team	(Czech Republic) Jan Vonka (Italy) Mauro Casadei (Austria) Manfred Jurasz	Porsche 911 GT3-RS	D	87
15	GT2	56	(Czech Republic) Czech National Team	(Czech Republic) Jan Vonka (Italy) Mauro Casadei (Austria) Manfred Jurasz	Porsche 3.6L Flat-6	D	87
16 DNF	GT1	4	(Germany) Konrad Motorsport	(Czech Republic) Adam Lacko (Poland) Max Stanco (Brazil) Antônio Hermann	Saleen S7-R	P	71
16 DNF	GT1	4	(Germany) Konrad Motorsport	(Czech Republic) Adam Lacko (Poland) Max Stanco (Brazil) Antônio Hermann	Ford 7.0L V8	P	71
17 DNF	GT1	14	(United Kingdom) Lister Storm Racing	(United Kingdom) Justin Keen (United States) Liz Halliday	Lister Storm GT	D	57
17 DNF	GT1	14	(United Kingdom) Lister Storm Racing	(United Kingdom) Justin Keen (United States) Liz Halliday	Jaguar 7.0L V12	D	57
18 DNF	GT2	86	(Italy) GPC Sport	(Italy) Luca Drudi (Hong Kong) Jeffrey Lee (Italy) Batti Pregliasco	Ferrari 360 Modena GTC	P	33
18 DNF	GT2	86	(Italy) GPC Sport	(Italy) Luca Drudi (Hong Kong) Jeffrey Lee (Italy) Batti Pregliasco	Ferrari 3.6L V8	P	33
19 DNF	GT1	16	(Monaco) JMB Racing	(Italy) Luca Pirri-Ardizzone (Italy) Marcello Zani (Switzerland) Christophe Pillon	Maserati MC12 GT1	P	30
19 DNF	GT1	16	(Monaco) JMB Racing	(Italy) Luca Pirri-Ardizzone (Italy) Marcello Zani (Switzerland) Christophe Pillon	Maserati 6.0L V12	P	30
20 DNF	GT1	17	(Russia) Russian Age Racing	(France) Christophe Bouchut (Russia) Nikolai Fomenko (Russia) Alexey Vasilyev	Aston Martin DBR9	MI	12
20 DNF	GT1	17	(Russia) Russian Age Racing	(France) Christophe Bouchut (Russia) Nikolai Fomenko (Russia) Alexey Vasilyev	Aston Martin 6.0L V12	MI	12
21 DNF	GT1	5	(Germany) Konrad Motorsport	(Italy) Paolo Ruberti (Austria) Robert Lechner (Austria) Franz Konrad	Saleen S7-R	P	8
21 DNF	GT1	5	(Germany) Konrad Motorsport	(Italy) Paolo Ruberti (Austria) Robert Lechner (Austria) Franz Konrad	Ford 7.0L V8	P	8
22 DNF	GT2	69	(Germany) Proton Competition	(Germany) Christian Ried (Germany) Gerold Ried	Porsche 911 GT3-RS	D	3
22 DNF	GT2	69	(Germany) Proton Competition	(Germany) Christian Ried (Germany) Gerold Ried	Porsche 3.6L Flat-6	D	3
23 DNF	GT2	97	(Netherlands) Lammertink Racing	(Germany) Wolfgang Kaufmann (Italy) Luca Moro	Porsche 911 GT3-RSR	MI	2
23 DNF	GT2	97	(Netherlands) Lammertink Racing	(Germany) Wolfgang Kaufmann (Italy) Luca Moro	Porsche 3.6L Flat-6	MI	2

== Statistics ==
- Pole Position – #17 Russian Age Racing – 1:30.661
- Fastest Lap – #11 Larbre Compétition – 1:31.691
- Average Speed – 157.30 km/h

FIA GT Championship
Previous race: 2005 FIA GT Istanbul 2 Hours	2005 season	Next race: 2005 FIA GT Motorcity GT 500
