= Zhuhai Street Circuit =

Motorsport circuit in Zhuhai, China

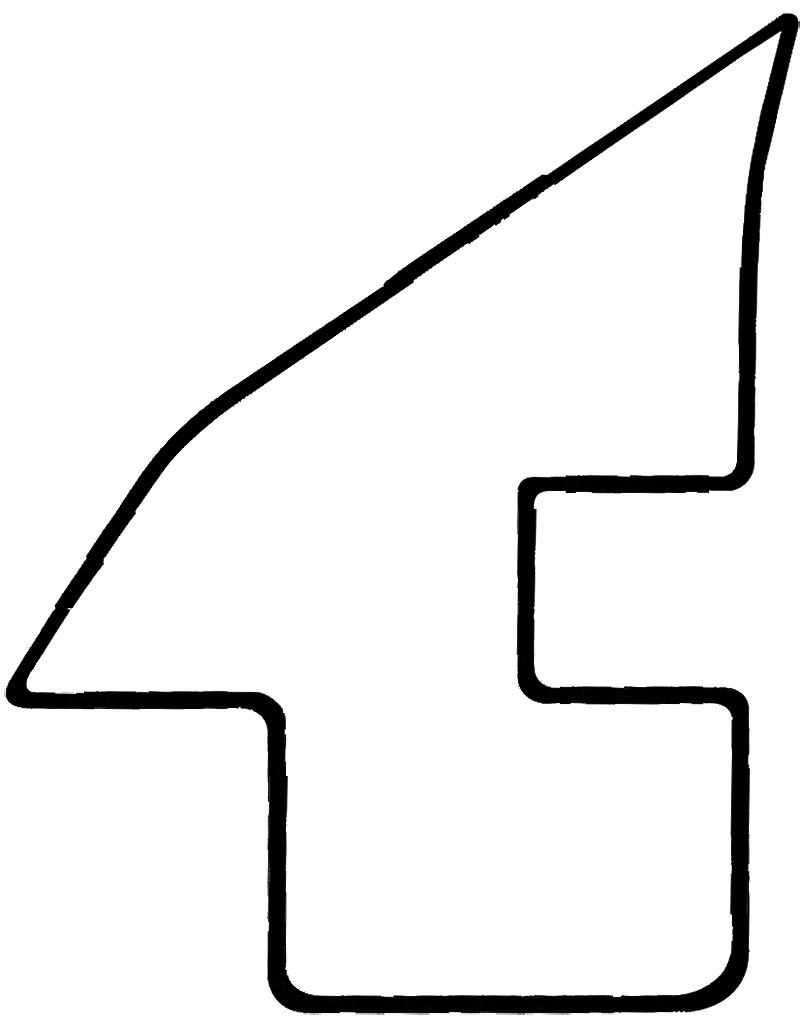
- Street Circuit (1993–1995)
- Location: Zhuhai, Guangdong, China
- Coordinates: 22°15′10.8″N 113°34′46.92″E
- Opened: 6 March 1993; 32 years ago
- Closed: 12 November 1995; 30 years ago
- Major events: BPR Global GT (1994–1995); Zhuhai Street Race (1993)

Street Circuit (March 1993–November 1995)
- Length: 4.200 km (2.610 mi)
- Turns: 10
- Race lap record: 1:45.653 ( (Denmark) John Nielsen, McLaren F1 GTR, 1995, GT1)

Zhuhai Street Circuit was a 4.200 km (2.610 mi) street circuit used in 1993–1995 in Zhuhai for motorsports events before the completion of the permanent Zhuhai International Circuit in 1996.

The circuit was opened in March 1993, and only races run by the Hong Kong Automobile Association was held at the track that year. In 1994 and 1995, the BPR Global GT Series, Asian Formula 2000 and the South East Asian Touring Cars Challenge were held at the circuit.

After the completion of the Zhuhai International Circuit, the street circuit was discontinued.

== Facilities ==
All the pits, paddock, VIP suites, guest stand and race control are situated at the start/finish straight at Jiu Zhou City.

== Circuit route ==
The circuit ran clockwise. The start/finish line was at Jing Shan Road (景山路), at the end of the straight it turned right at 120 degrees onto Hai Bin Road (海濱路), it followed the road until it reached Ji Da Road (吉大路)where it turned 90 degrees right. Then it turned 90 degrees left to Jing Yuan Road (景園路) and then left again for Yuan Lin Road (園林路). There it turned right and rejoined Hai Bin Road.

It then turned right for Jiu Zhou Road (九州大道), then another right for Jing Le Road (景樂路). After that was another 90 degree left turn for Yuan Lin Road before another sharp right for Jing Shan Road. It followed Jing Shan Road and then a slight right turn back to Jiu Zhou Road and the finish line.
