= Zhuhai International Circuit =

Motorsport race track in China

- Full Circuit (1996–present)
- Location: Zhuhai, Guangdong, China
- Coordinates: 22°22′1.9″N 113°33′23″E
- FIA Grade: 2
- Opened: November 1996; 30 years ago
- Architect: Kinhill Engineers Pty Ltd
- Major events: Current: Porsche Carrera Cup Asia (2006–2014, 2021, 2026); SRO GT Cup (2026); Future: FR Asia (2027); Former: Asia Road Racing Championship (2001–2002, 2004–2012, 2019, 2023–2024); Asian Le Mans Series (2013, 2016–2017); FIM EWC (2004); TCR Asia (2017, 2019); TCR China Touring Car Championship (2018–2019); Intercontinental Le Mans Cup 6 Hours of Zhuhai (2010–2011); FIA GT (1999, 2004–2005, 2007); BPR Global GT Series (1996); A1 Grand Prix (2007)
- Website: http://www.zic.com.cn/zicen

Full Circuit (1996–present)
- Surface: Asphalt
- Length: 4.319 km (2.684 mi)
- Turns: 14
- Race lap record: 1:22.296 ( (France) Franck Montagny, Peugeot 908 HDi FAP, 2010, LMP1)

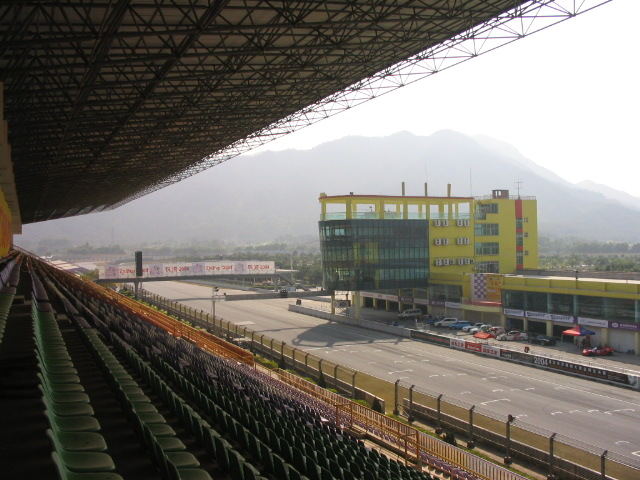
The circuit from the main grandstand.

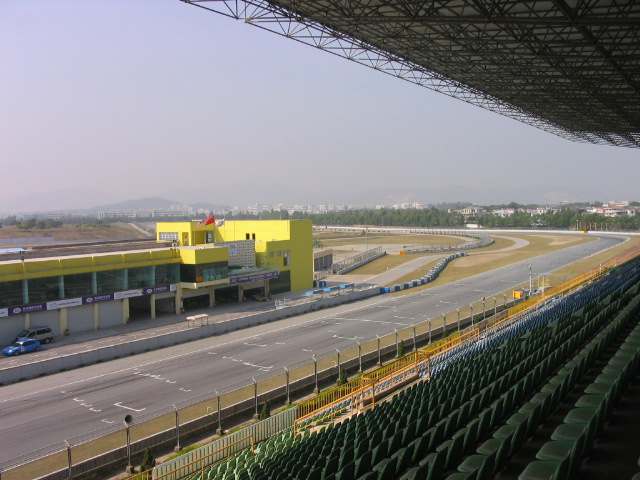
The final corner and the pit lane entrance.

Zhuhai International Circuit (ZIC) (simplified Chinese: 珠海国际赛车场; traditional Chinese: 珠海國際賽車場) is located at Jin Ding town in Zhuhai City, Guangdong Province, China.

Motorsport started in Zhuhai when it hosted a race on its street circuit in 1993. Racing continued there until 1996 when the motor racing circuit was constructed and became China's first permanent motor race track with Formula One in mind.

The circuit was designed by Australian company Kinhill Engineers Pty Ltd, the same group which created the Formula One circuit in Adelaide. The project manager for the project was Michael McDonough.

The first international race held at the circuit was the BPR Global GT Series. The circuit soon became the hotbed of local motorsports with teams from Hong Kong and Macau setting up their bases inside the circuit garages.

== Track layout ==
The original circuit contained 16 corners. But corners 7, 8 and 9 were eliminated and made into one corner, after a track change request from FIM.

The circuit is 4.319 km (2.684 mi) long and has 14 turns. 9 of them are right turns and 5 are left turns and the circuit runs clockwise only. The shorter straight is 0.500 km (0.311 mi) long. The longest straight is the start/finish straight which is 900 m (0.56 mi) long and 14 m (15 yd) wide at its widest. Alexandre Imperatori, A1 Team Switzerland's rookie driver, suggested that there are many overtaking places in the circuit because of the combination of straights, hard braking areas for hairpins, tight corners, followed by and accelerating for long straights. The most successful driver on the circuit is the best one who can manage their brake wear. Zhuhai International Circuit is an FIA Grade 2 certified circuit.

== Lap records ==
The fastest qualifying lap ever at the circuit was 1:23.203, set by Michael Ammermüller on a Lola A1GP on the fourth round on December 16, 2007 during the 2007-08 A1 Grand Prix season. However, this is not considered the lap record since lap records are taken from racing laps and not qualifying.

The fastest unofficial lap ever at the circuit was set by a 2007 Panoz DP01 Champ Car on November 30, 2006. Driven by Roberto Moreno, it managed a lap of 1:23.612 during a demonstration run.

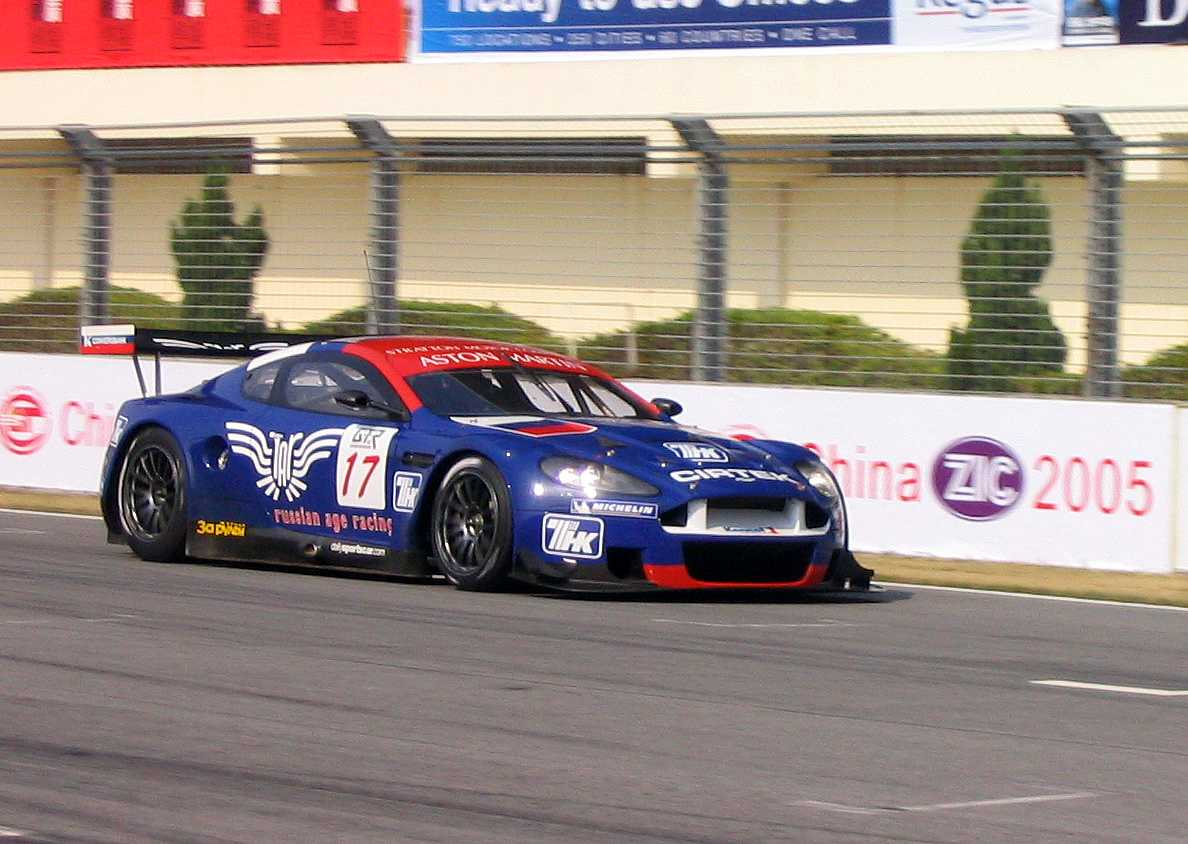
Russian Age Racing's Aston Martin DBR9 at ZIC.

The fastest unofficial GT1 lap time is set by Porsche 911 GT1 with Porsche AG team in 1996 4 Hours of Zhuhai. The time was 1:30.401.

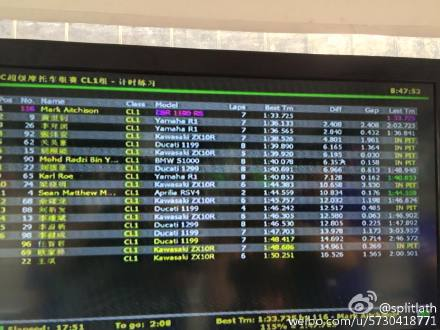

The fastest unofficial lap ever on a motorcycle was set at a Pan Delta 1000cc Superbike race, taken by splitlath team. Winning all 6 races, Splitlath rider Mark Aitchison smashed the ZIC Superbike lap record 1:33.725 on an EBR RS 1190.

=== Race lap records ===
As of October 2026, the fastest official race lap records at the Zhuhai International Circuit are listed as:

Category	Time	Driver	Vehicle	Event
Grand Prix Circuit (1996–present): 4.319 km (2.684 mi)
LMP1	1:22.296	Franck Montagny	Peugeot 908 HDi FAP	2010 1000 km of Zhuhai
A1GP	1:24.418	Neel Jani	Lola A1GP	2007 Zhuhai A1GP round
LMP2	1:28.308	Thomas Laurent	Oreca 05	2017 4 Hours of Zhuhai
Formula Renault 3.5	1:30.529	Marchy Lee	Tatuus FRV6	2006 2nd Zhuhai Formula V6 Asia round
LMP3	1:30.883	Josh Burdon	Ligier JS P3	2017 4 Hours of Zhuhai
GT1 (GTS)	1:31.691	Pedro Lamy	Ferrari 550-GTS Maranello	2005 FIA GT Zhuhai Supercar 500
GT1	1:31.749	Yannick Dalmas	Porsche 911 GT1	1996 BPR 4 Hours of Zhuhai
Superbike	1:32.495	Zaqhwan Zaidi	Honda CBR1000RR-R Fireblade	2023 Zhuhai ARRC round
LMPC	1:32.948	Shan Qi Zhang	Oreca FLM09	2010 1000 km of Zhuhai
Formula Renault 2.0	1:33.753	Joey Alders	Tatuus FR2.0/13	2019 3rd Zhuhai Asian Formula Renault round
GT2 (GTS)	1:33.761	Olivier Beretta (Note: Both drivers took the same lap time independently.); Sascha Maassen	Chrysler Viper GTS-R; Porsche 911 GT2	1999 FIA GT Zhuhai 500km
GT3	1:34.055	Frédéric Vervisch	Ferrari 488 GT3	2016 4 Hours of Zhuhai
LM GTE	1:34.815	Uwe Alzen	BMW M3 GT2	2011 6 Hours of Zhuhai
GT2	1:35.529	Toni Vilander	Ferrari F430 GTC	2010 1000 km of Zhuhai
Supersport	1:36.870	Khairul Idham Pawi	Honda CBR600RR	2023 Zhuhai ARRC round
Porsche Carrera Cup	1:36.876	Montego Maassen	Porsche 911 (992 II) GT3 Cup	2026 Zhuhai Porsche Carrera Cup Asia round
N-GT	1:37.314	Christian Pescatori	Ferrari 360 Modena GTC	2004 FIA GT Zhuhai 500km
Formula 4	1:39.472	Timur Shagaliev	Mygale M21-F4	2026 Zhuhai Chinese F4 round
FIA GT Group-2	1:40.132	Bas Leinders	Gillet Vertigo Streiff	2005 FIA GT Zhuhai Supercar 500
Asian Formula 2000	1:41.450	Asif Nazir	Argo Formula Asia	2001 Zhuhai Asian Formula 2000 round
Formula BMW	1:41.455	Jazeman Jaafar	Mygale FB02	2007 Zhuhai Formula BMW Asia round
Super Touring	1:43.299	Kasikam Suphot	Nissan Primera	1998 2nd Zhuhai SEATCZC round
GT4	1:43.956	Han Lichao	Toyota GR Supra GT4 Evo 2	2026 Zhuhai SRO GT Cup round
TCR Touring Car	1:44.159	Luca Engstler	Hyundai i30 N TCR	2019 Zhuhai TCR Asia round
Super 2000	1:49.839	Henry Lee Junior	Peugeot 306 GTi	2000 2nd Zhuhai ATCC round
Asia Production 250	1:50.528	Muklada Sarapuech	Honda CBR250RR	2023 Zhuhai ARRC round
Asia Underbone 150	1:59.920	Ahmad Fazrul Sham	Yamaha Z150R	2023 Zhuhai ARRC round

== Event list ==
Current

- April: Porsche Carrera Cup Asia
- May: SRO GT Cup
- July: China GT Championship
- October: F4 Chinese Championship

Future

- Formula Regional Asian Championship (2027)

Former

- A1 Grand Prix (2007)
- Asian Formula Three Championship (2002, 2005–2008)
- Asian Le Mans Series
  - 4 Hours of Zhuhai (2013, 2016–2017)
- Asia Road Racing Championship (2001–2002, 2004–2012, 2019, 2023–2024)
- Asian Touring Car Series (2000–2002, 2005–2007)
- Aston Martin Asia Cup (2008)
- BPR Global GT Series (1996)
- China Superbike Championship (2007–2011)
- Ferrari Challenge Asia-Pacific (2011, 2015)
- FIA GT Championship
  - Zhuhai 2 Hours (1999, 2004–2005, 2007)
- FIM Endurance World Championship
  - Zhuhai 6 Hours (2004)
- Formula BMW Asia (2006–2007)
- Formula Renault AsiaCup (2003–2019)
- Formula V6 Asia (2006–2007)
- Intercontinental Le Mans Cup
  - 6 Hours of Zhuhai (2010–2011)
- Lamborghini Super Trofeo Asia (2014)
- South East Asia Touring Car Zone Challenge (1996–1999)
- TCR Asia Series (2017, 2019)
- TCR China Touring Car Championship (2018–2019)

== Event organizer ==
Zhuhai International Circuit Co Ltd was also a prominent motorsport event organizer and promoter in China. It organized and promoted the FIA GT Championship in China and in 2007, it also signed a contract with China Motorcycle Sports Association to promote the inaugural China Superbike Championship.

== Races ==
=== National races ===
Zhuhai International Circuit was the promoter of the China Superbike Championship, established in 2007 and sanctioned by the China Motorcycle Sports Association, CMSA.

ZIC also organizes the Circuit Hero and Circuit Hero GT race series, which allows citizens of the People's Republic of China to participate.

=== HTCC and MTCC ===
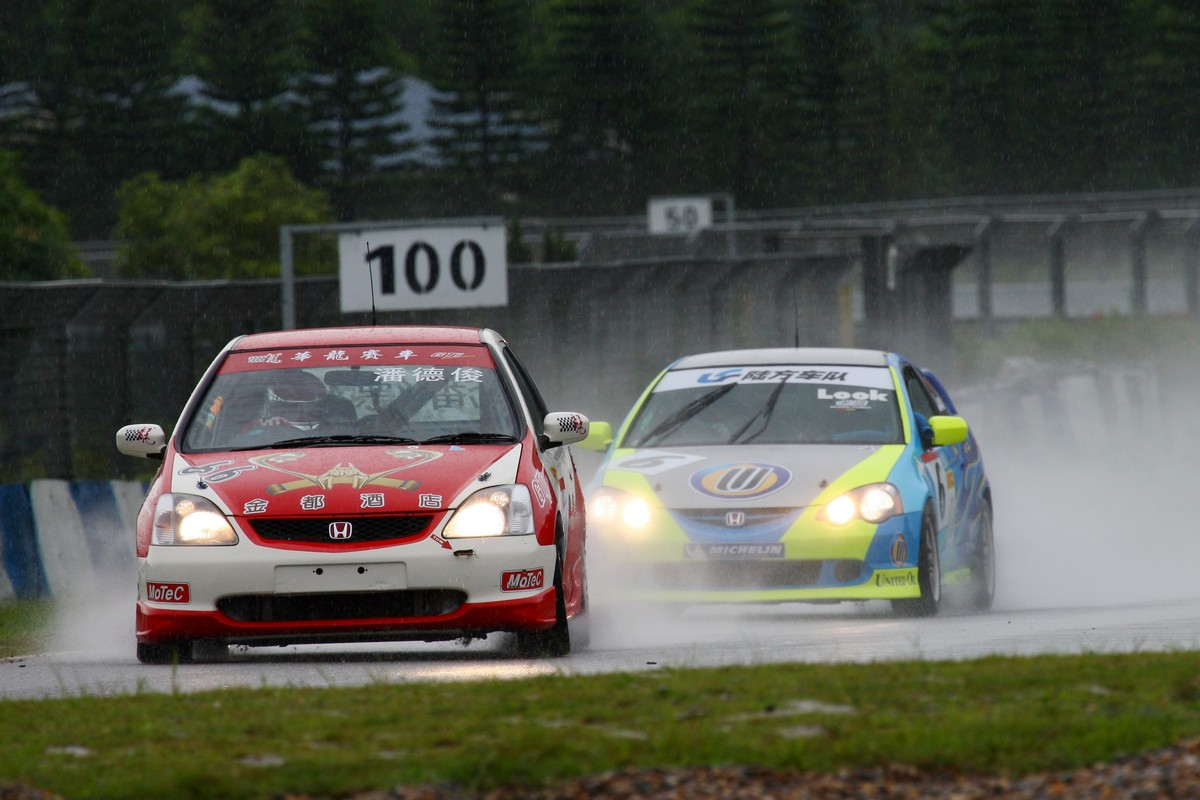
Paul Poon leads Kenneth Look in the rain at ZIC during a Hong Kong Touring Car Championship race.

The Hong Kong Touring Car Championship and the Macau Touring Car Championship both run the majority of their races at ZIC since they began.

=== Asian races ===
The Asian Festival of Speed was held at the circuit from October 20, 2006 to October 22, 2006, when a record 33,000 people turned up to watch the races.

AFOS has been held at the circuit many times since its inception in 1994.

The Asian Formula Three Championship is also hosted by the circuit in 2002, 2005–2008.

In addition, the FIM Asia Road Racing Championship race at ZIC regularly in 2001–2002, 2004–2012, 2019, 2023.

=== Formula One ambitions ===
ZIC was included in the provisional 1999 F1 calendar, but the circuit subsequently lost its place in the calendar after failing to meet the international standards set by the FIA. F1 subsequently raced in Shanghai International Circuit.

=== Endurance World Championship ===
In May 2004, the Endurance World Championship Zhuhai 6 Hours race was held at the circuit. This was the first time an international motorcycle race was held at the circuit. The race was won by GMT 94 Racing.

=== FIA GT Championship ===
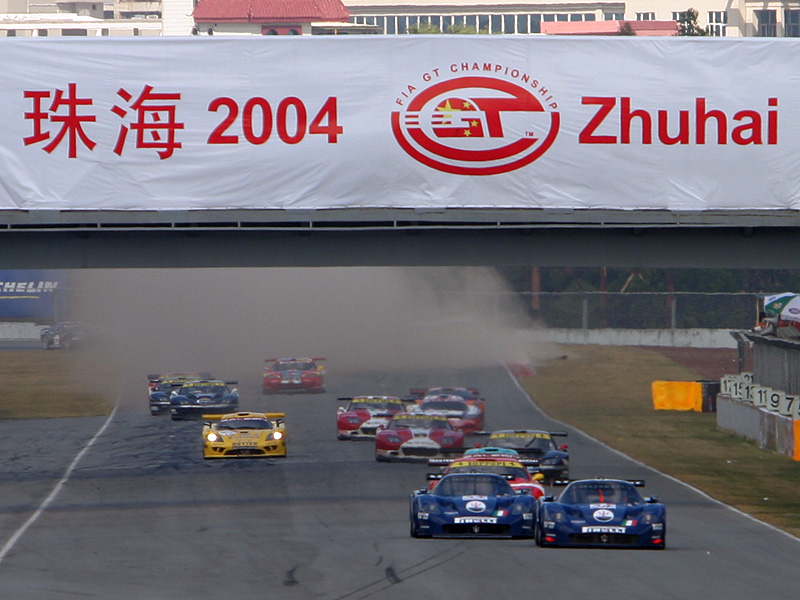
Maseratis leading the FIA GT Championship race at Zhuhai in 2004.

In 1997, the circuit hosted a race in the inaugural FIA GT Championship. It hosted further races in the series in 1999, 2004, 2005 and 2007. The 2007 event was postponed from October 2006 to March 2007, in order to avoid a clash with the Shanghai F1 Grand Prix in early October and the Macau Grand Prix in the middle of November. The race was won by All-Inkl.com racing's Lamborghini Murciélago R-GT, driven by Christophe Bouchut and Stefan Mucke. GT2 class was won by AF Corse's Ferrari F430 GT2, with Dirk Müller and Toni Vilander at the wheel.

=== A1 Grand Prix ===
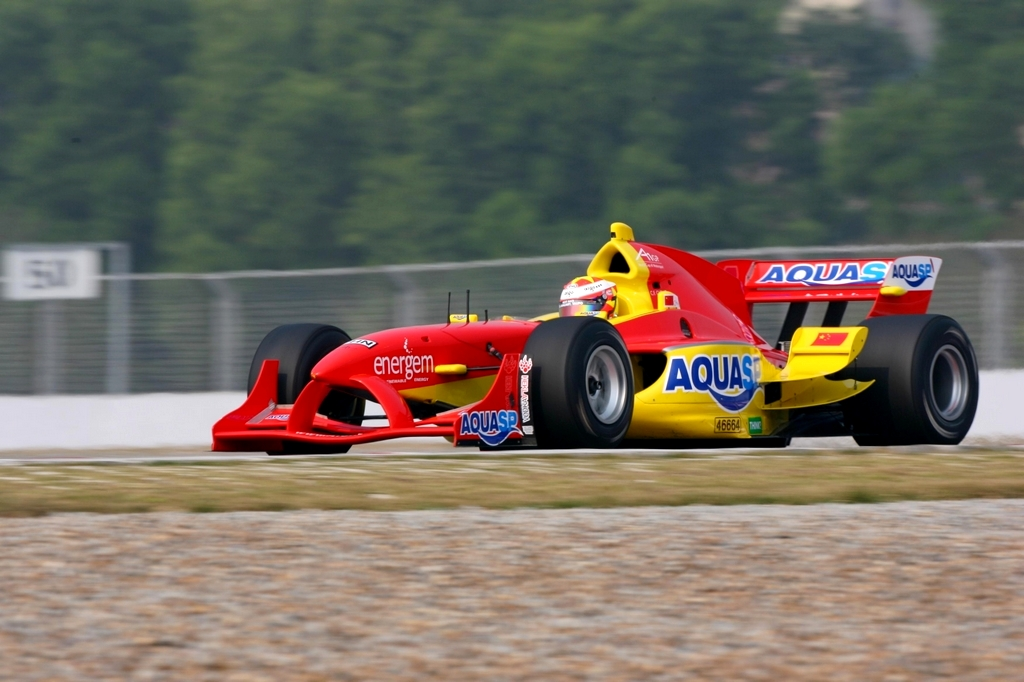
A1 Team China racing at Zhuhai International Circuit in the 2007 A1GP race at ZIC.

Zhuhai International Circuit staged the fourth round of the 2007-08 A1 Grand Prix season on December 16, 2007. The Sprint race was won by Michael Ammermüller of Team Germany and the Feature race was won by Narain Karthikeyan of Team India. On October 13, 2009, Executive Deputy General Manager of Zhuhai International Circuit, Stewart Tan, said he welcomed A1 Grand Prix's return to the circuit for November 15, 2009. However, the series had more races cancelled, with an announcement made on 5 November 2009 stating that races in China and Malaysia were not taking part.

=== Le Mans Intercontinental Cup ===
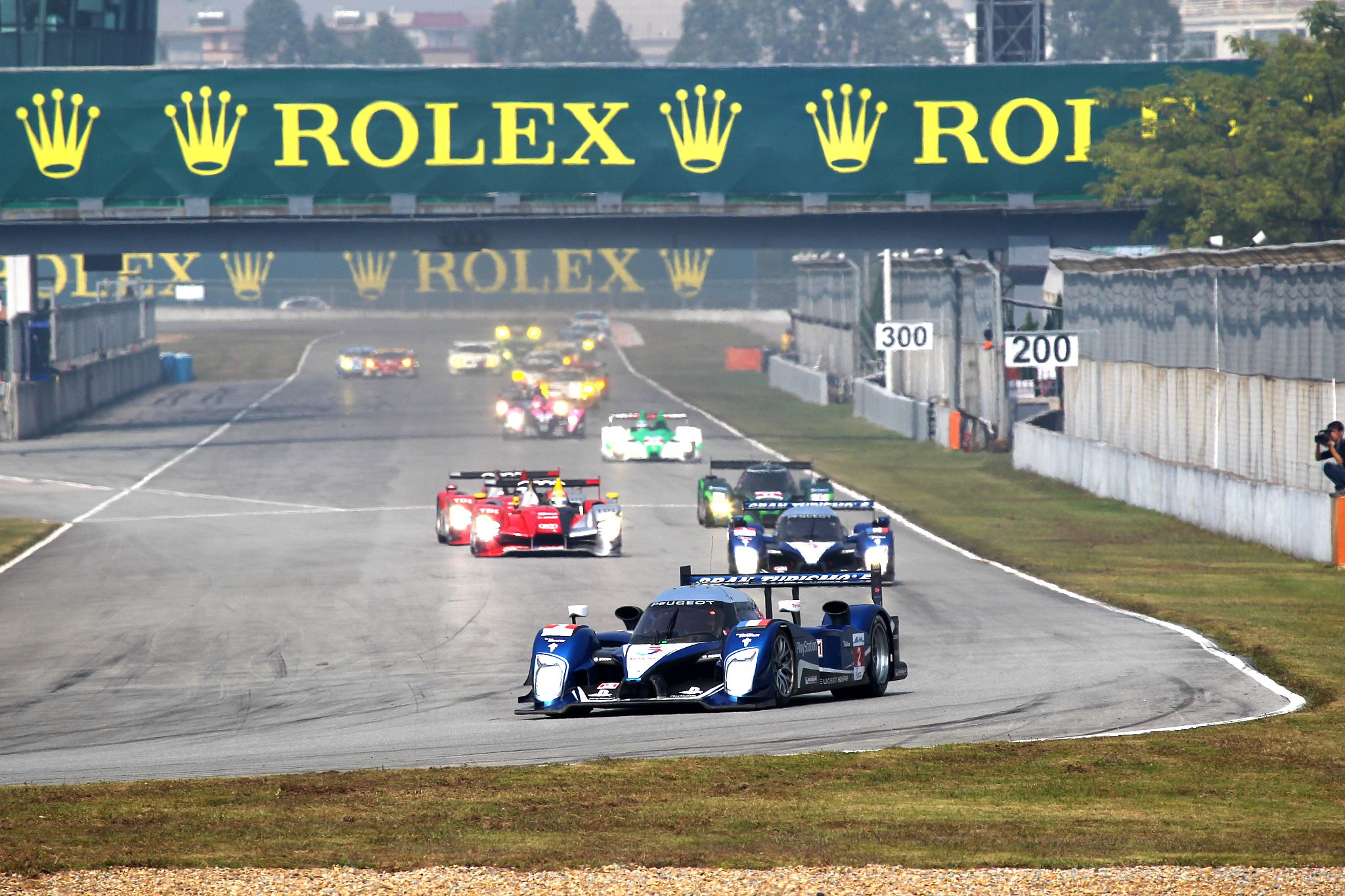
Intercontinental Le Mans Cup race start at ZIC.

The 2010 1000 km of Zhuhai was held at the circuit in November 2010, forming a round of the 2010 Le Mans Intercontinental Cup. In November 2011, the circuit hosted the 2011 6 Hours of Zhuhai, the finale of the 2011 Intercontinental Le Mans Cup season.

=== Super GT ambitions ===
In 2004, the GT Association, the organizer of Super GT, announced on 23 May that an All-Star race in China, scheduled for 4 to 6 October at ZIC. But on 5 August 2004, JGTC announced that the race was cancelled, for reasons related to the Chinese organizer.

=== Champ Car ===
A multi year deal was announced in 2006 that brought one of the American racing series to China. On 30 November 2006, Roberto Moreno made history as he took the 2007 DP01 Champ Car on track at the Zhuhai Circuit, marking the first time a Champ Car had run in China.

Then the series had problems with its promoter, which settled in a court in the US, and was replaced. The new promoter did not have enough time to organize the race on the original May date and so the race was provisionally moved to October 2007. When the series failed to get F.I.A. approval for the October date the 2007 race was cancelled. The series was looking to race in Zhuhai for the 2008 season until the unification with Indy Racing League but most of the speculation had died down.

== Ownership ==
On 2 October 2003, Dragon Hill Corporation Ltd, part of LBS Bina Group, exercised its option to buy Lamdeal Investment Ltd, which is involved in managing Zhuhai International Circuit Ltd (ZICL), for US$1. LBS managing director, Datuk Lim Hock San said LBS believed in the potential of the ZIC circuit land, adding the acquisition "has come at an appropriate time. Upon completion of the exercise of the option, Dragon Hill will hold 100% of the entire issued and paid-up share capital of Lamdeal and Lamdeal will own 60% of ZICL," he said.

On 19 June 2024, LBS Bina Group Bhd announced it is selling its stake in Zhuhai International Circuit for RMB192.18 million. The group said its wholly owned unit Dragon Hill Corporation Ltd, planned to sell its entire 100 per cent interest in Lamdeal Investments Ltd (Lamdeal) to Huafa Urban Operation (HK) Ltd. Lamdeal holds a 60 per cent interest in Zhuhai International Circuit Limited. As part of the deal, Huafa will settle RM147.9 million in loans that Lamdeal and its subsidiaries, owed to LBS Bina.

== Track rentals ==
Since 2005, the circuit has become a hive of track activities, with a large number of auto-related launches and events held at the circuit, as the battle for car sales in China heats up. Auto dealers and manufacturers try to lure more customers by allowing them to drive freely on the track and pampering them off it.

== Karting ==
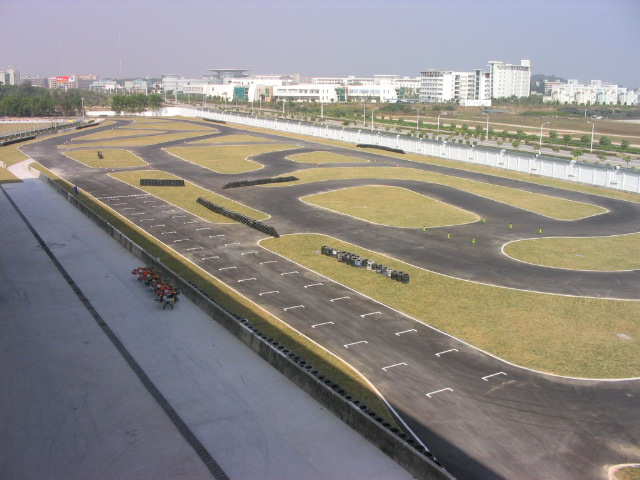
ZIC Kart Circuit.

A kart circuit was added to the ZIC facility in 2004.

In 2011, Sunny Racing Club was established. The club uses a one make Sunny Kart chassis and 2-stroke 100cc Yamaha engine.

== Simulations ==
GTR2 has the circuit simulated based on the 2004 FIA GT Championship season. The circuit has also been simulated on the racing simulator Project CARS. In March 2018, the track was released for Raceroom Racing Experience.

== Transportation ==
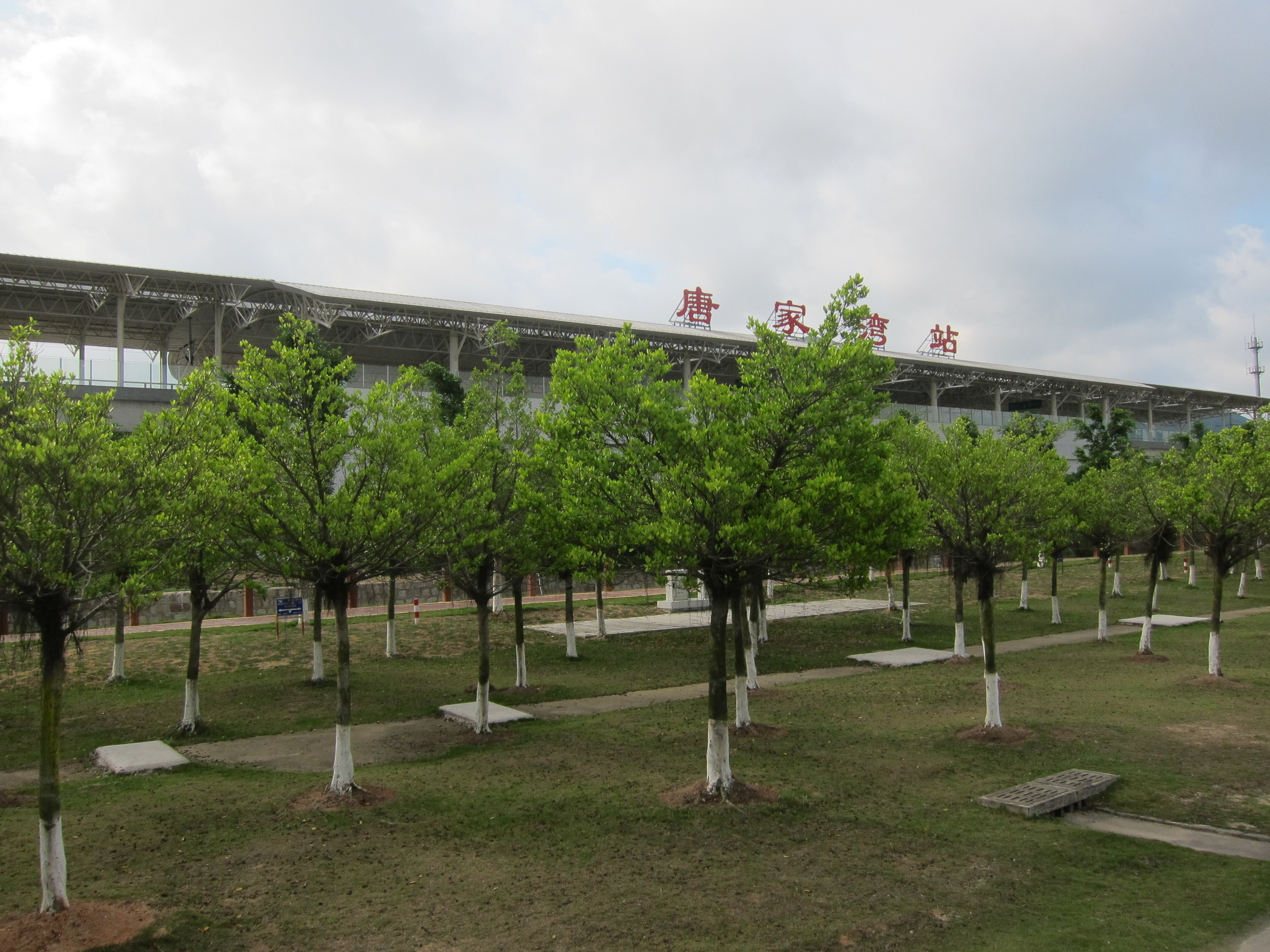
When Tangjiawan Station of the Guangzhu MRT opens in 2012, visitors will have direct rail access to the ZIC.

The ZIC has a bus stop which is served by routes 3, 3A, 10, 10A, 66, 68 and 69 of the Zhuhai bus network.

It is also served by the Guangzhou–Zhuhai Intercity Mass Rapid Transit, as Tangjiawan Station is within walking distance of the circuit's west grandstand.
