= Intercontinental Le Mans Cup =

Endurance sports car racing tournament

- Country: International
- Inaugural season: 2010
- Folded: 2011
- Prototype classes: LMP1, LMP2
- GT classes: LM GTE Pro, LM GTE Am
- Last Makes' champion: LMP1: Peugeot; GTE: Ferrari
- Last Teams' champion: LMP1: Peugeot Sport Total; LMP2: Signatech Nissan; GTE Pro: AF Corse; GTE Am: Larbre Compétition
- Official website: intercontinental-le-mans-cup.com

The Intercontinental Le Mans Cup (shortened ILMC) was an endurance sports car racing tournament organised by the Automobile Club de l'Ouest (ACO) started in 2010. The plans were first announced in June 2009 and confirmed in December of the same year.

Both sports prototypes and grand tourers were eligible to compete for the ILMC: the LMP1 and GTE classes each had a manufacturers cup, whereas all ACO classes had teams cups as long as there were at least four entries. In 2010 also the GT1 class was eligible for the final time.

Peugeot was totally dominant winning 9 out of the 10 races during the two years.

For 2012, the ACO and the FIA announced the creation of a new FIA World Endurance Championship. This championship would use similar rules to and would replace the Intercontinental Le Mans Cup.

== History ==
The 2010 calendar comprised the 1000 km Silverstone (Silverstone, United Kingdom, September 12), the Petit Le Mans (Road Atlanta, United States, October 2) and the 1000 km Zhuhai (Zhuhai, China, November 7). Meanwhile, the 2011 calendar expanded to seven events. Along with the Silverstone (six-hour race) and Petit Le Mans races on similar dates, the championship started with the 12 Hours of Sebring (Sebring, United States, March) before moving into Europe to contest a six-hour race at Spa-Francorchamps in Belgium on May, the 24 Hours of Le Mans (Le Mans, France, June 11–12), and another six hour race at the Imola circuit in Italy on July. The season finale was held in China on the Zhuhai circuit.

== Champions ==
| Season | LMP1 Team | LMP2 Team | GT1 Team | GT2/GTE Pro Team | GTE Am Team | Ref |
| Season | LMP1 Manufacturer | | | GT2/GTE Manufacturer | | Ref |
|---|---|---|---|---|---|---|
| 2010 | (France) Peugeot Sport Total | (France) OAK Racing | (France) Larbre Compétition | (Germany) Team Felbermayr-Proton | none | |
| 2010 | (France) Peugeot | | | (Italy) Ferrari | | |
| 2011 | (France) Peugeot Sport Total | (France) Signatech Nissan | none | (Italy) AF Corse | (France) Larbre Compétition | |
| 2011 | (France) Peugeot | | | (Italy) Ferrari | | |
