= Marc Duez =

Belgian racing and rally driver (born 1957)

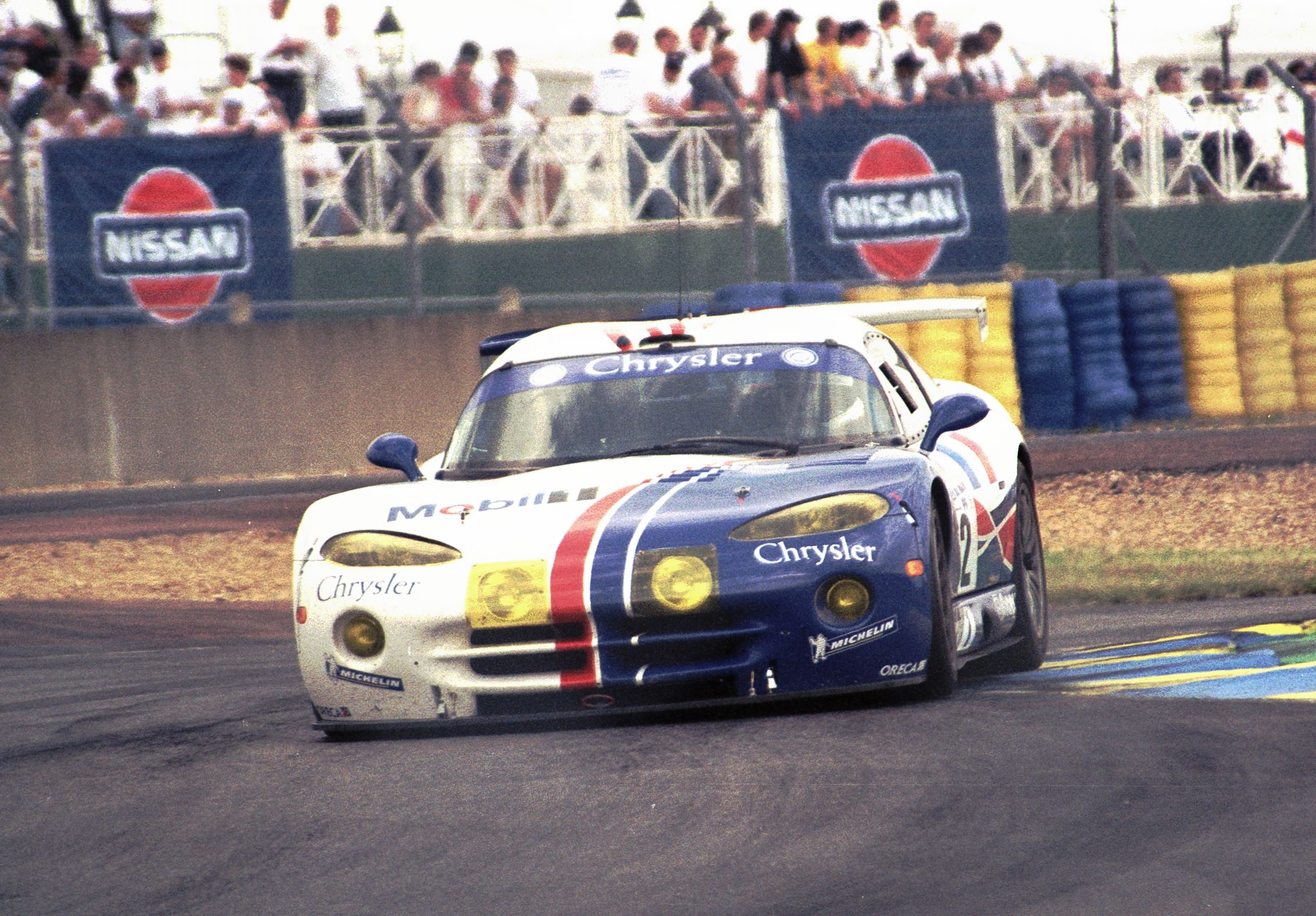
- Duez at the 1999 24 Hours of Le Mans

Personal information
- Nationality: (Belgium) Belgian
- Full name: Marc Charles Nicolas Duez
- Born: 18 April 1957 (age 69); Verviers, Belgium

World Rally Championship record
- Years active: 1983, 1986–1991, 1998–1999, 2014–2015, 2021
- Co-driver: (Belgium) Leon Lejeune (Belgium) Willy Lux (Belgium) Georges Biar (France) Pierre Thimonier (Belgium) Alain Lopes (Germany) Klaus Wicha (France) Gilles Thimonier (Belgium) Luc Manset (France) Philippe Dupuy (Belgium) Steven Vyncke (Germany) Jacques Castelein
- Teams: Austin Rover, Prodrive, Bastos Racing Team, RAS Sport, Toyota, Team Gamma, SEAT
- Rallies: 28
- Championships: 0
- Rally wins: 0
- Podiums: 1
- Stage wins: 2
- Total points: 34
- First rally: 1983 Rallye de Portugal
- Last rally: 2021 Ypres Rally Belgium

Marc Charles Nicolas Duez (born 18 April 1957 in Verviers) is a Belgian racing and rally driver who last competed in the 2021 World Rally Championship.

Duez won the 24 Hours of Nürburgring 4 times (1992, 1995, 1998 & 1999), the 24 Hours Spa three times (1997, 1998 & 2001) and the 24 Hours of Zolder two times (2000 & 2006).

Duez also has competed in the 24 Hours of Le Mans, scoring 4 class podiums, and the Andros Trophy.

For years now, Duez has been a representative for the RACB, the Royal Automobil Club of Belgium. He strongly promotes the Driver's Academy and the Belgian Racing Circuits.

Also since 2009, Duez has been racing for Fun Still Exists, also known as FSE. For this team, he has been racing the Legend Boucles de Spa 2010 and Ypres Historic Rally 2010, and also the Legend Boucles de Spa 2011.

== Career results ==
=== 24 Hours of Le Mans results ===
Year	Team	Co-Drivers	Car	Class	Laps	Pos.	Class Pos.
1983	(Germany) Belga Team Joest Racing	(Belgium) Jean-Michel Martin (Belgium) Philippe Martin	Porsche 936C	C	9	DNF	DNF
1987	(United Kingdom) Ecurie Ecosse	(United Kingdom) David Leslie (United Kingdom) Ray Mallock	Ecosse C286-Ford Cosworth	C2	308	8th	2nd
1988	(Japan) Mazdaspeed Co. Ltd.	(Japan) Yoshimi Katayama (United Kingdom) David Leslie	Mazda 767	GTP	330	17th	2nd
1989	(Japan) Mazdaspeed Co. Ltd.	(Japan) Yojiro Terada (Germany) Volker Weidler	Mazda 767	GTP	339	12th	3rd
1990	(Germany) Obermaier Racing	(Germany) Jürgen Oppermann (Germany) Harald Grohs	Porsche 962C	C1	140	DNF	DNF
1993	(France) Écurie Toison d'Or	(Belgium) Éric Bachelart (Belgium) Philip Verellen	Venturi 500LM	GT	267	25th	9th
1996	(Italy) Team Bigazzi SRL (Germany) Team BMW Motorsport	(France) Jacques Laffite (United Kingdom) Steve Soper	McLaren F1 GTR	GT1	318	11th	9th
1997	(France) Viper Team Oreca	(United States) Tommy Archer (France) Soheil Ayari	Chrysler Viper GTS-R	GT2	76	DNF	DNF
1998	(France) Viper Team Oreca	(Austria) Karl Wendlinger (Netherlands) Patrick Huisman	Chrysler Viper GTS-R	GT2	28	DNF	DNF
1999	(France) Viper Team Oreca	(United States) Tommy Archer (United Kingdom) Justin Bell	Chrysler Viper GTS-R	GTS	318	12th	2nd
2000	(France) Viper Team Oreca	(United States) Tommy Archer (Netherlands) Patrick Huisman	Chrysler Viper GTS-R	GTS	324	12th	5th
2002	(France) DAMS	(France) Jérôme Policand (United Kingdom) Perry McCarthy	Panoz LMP-1 Roadster-S	LMP900	98	DNF	DNF

=== 24 Hours of Spa results ===
Year	Team	Co-Drivers	Car	Class	Laps	Pos.	Class Pos.
1977	(Belgium) Racing Team Debor	(France) Pierre Laffeach (Switzerland) André Savary	Toyota Celica RA25 2000 LB	T2.5		DNF	DNF
1978	(Belgium) Luigi Racing	(Belgium) Thierry Boutsen (Italy) Lella Lombardi	Toyota Sprinter Trueno	1	5	DNF	DNF
1979	(United Kingdom) Gordon Spice Racing	(Belgium) Dany Baele (Belgium) Daniël Herregods	Ford Capri III 3.0S	serT+2.5		DNF	DNF
1980	(Belgium) Belga Castrol Team	(Belgium) Jean-Louis Dumont (Belgium) Freddy "Alain Dex" Semoulin	Ford Capri III 3.0S	serT+2.5	91	DNF	DNF
1981	(United Kingdom) Mazda Motul TWR Team	(United Kingdom) Jeff Allam (United Kingdom) Chuck Nicholson (United Kingdom) Win Percy	Mazda RX-7	ser.T2.5	445	5th	2nd
1982	(Belgium) Belgian Audi VW Club	(Germany) Willi Bergmeister (Germany) Manfred Trint	Audi Coupé GT5E	2	418	13th	4th
1983	(Belgium) Michel De Deyne	(Belgium) Michel De Deyne (Belgium) Hervé Regout	Mercedes-Benz 450 SLC	3		DNF	DNF
1984	(United Kingdom) Rover Gitanes	(United Kingdom) Pete Lovett (France) Jean-Louis Schlesser	Rover Vitesse	3	437	7th	7th
1986	(Sweden) Carlsson Motorsport	(Belgium) Bruno di Gioia (Czech Republic) Zdeněk Vojtěch	Mercedes 190 E 2.3-16	2		DNF	DNF
1987	(Belgium) Waterloo Motors Lease Plan	(Belgium) Philip Verellen (Belgium) Raijmond Van Hove	BMW 635 CSi	3	458	8th	3rd
1988	(Germany) BMW Motorsport	(France) Jean-Pierre Jabouille (France) Jean-Louis Schlesser	BMW 635 CSi	2	477	8th	4th
1989	BMW Belgium	(United Kingdom) Steve Soper (Belgium) Didier Theys	BMW 635 CSi	2	182	DNF	DNF
1990	(Germany) BMW M Team Schnitzer	(Germany) Christian Danner (Austria) Dieter Quester	BMW M3 Sport Evo	DTM-Class 2	467	2nd	2nd
1991	(Belgium) Toyota Racing	(Belgium) José Close (Belgium) Renaud Verreydt	Toyota MR2 SW20	Procar Div.2		DNF	DNF
1992	(Germany) BMW Fina Bastos Team	(Venezuela) Johnny Cecotto (Italy) Roberto Ravaglia	BMW M3 Sport Evo	DTM		DNF	DNF
1994	(Belgium) BMW Fina Bastos Team	(France) Alain Ferté (Germany) Joachim Winkelhock	BMW 318is	ST	516	2nd	2nd
1995	(Belgium) BMW Fina Bastos Team	(Brazil) Nelson Piquet (Italy) Roberto Ravaglia	BMW 320i	ST	509	2nd	2nd
1996	(Italy) BMW Fina Bastos Team Bigazzi	(Netherlands) Peter Kox (United Kingdom) Steve Soper	BMW 320i	ST	501	2nd	2nd
1997	(Italy) BMW Fina Bastos Team Bigazzi	(Belgium) Didier de Radigues (France) Eric Hélary	BMW 320i	ST	484	1st	1st
1998	(Belgium) BMW Fina Bastos Team	(France) Alain Cudini (Belgium) Eric van de Poele	BMW 320i	SP	480	1st	1st
1999	(Italy) BMW Fina Rafanelli	(Belgium) Didier de Radigues (Belgium) Vincent Vosse	BMW 320i	SP	51	DNF	DNF
2000	(Italy) BMW Fina Rafanelli	(Netherlands) Patrick Huisman (Belgium) Vincent Vosse	BMW 320i	SP		DNF	DNF
2001	(France) Larbre Compétition	(France) Jean-Philippe Belloc (France) Christophe Bouchut	Chrysler Viper GTS-R	GT	528	1st	1st
2002	(France) Paul Belmondo Racing	(Italy) Fabio Babini (France) Boris Derichebourg	Chrysler Viper GTS-R	GT	494	8th	4th
2004	(Netherlands) Zwaans GTR Racing Team	(Belgium) Loïc Deman (Belgium) Fanny Duchâteau (Belgium) Stéphane Lémeret	Chrysler Viper GTS-R	GT	362	DNF	DNF
2005	(Belgium) Renstal Excelsior	(France) Eric Cayrolle (France) Bruno Hernandez (Netherlands) Jos Menten	Chevrolet Corvette C5-R	GT1	536	8th	7th
2006	(Belgium) Ice Pol Racing Team	(Belgium) Marc Goossens (Belgium) Yves Lambert (Belgium) Christian Lefort	Porsche 996 GT3-RSR	GT2	512	16th	7th
2007	(Belgium) Selleslagh Racing Team	(Belgium) Damien Coens (Belgium) Maxime Soulet (Belgium) Steve Van Bellingen	Chevrolet Corvette C5-R	GT1	502	10th	8th
2008	(Belgium) Ice Pol Racing Team	(Belgium) Olivier Muytjens (Belgium) Ludovic Sougnez (Belgium) Koen Wauters	Porsche 997 GT3 Cup S	G3	267	DNF	DNF
2010	(Belgium) Marc VDS Racing Team	(Belgium) Bas Leinders (Belgium) Maxime Martin	Ford GT GT3	GT3	512	8th	2nd
2011	(Belgium) Marc VDS Racing Team	(Belgium) Éric Bachelart (Belgium) Jean-Michel Martin	Ford Mustang FR500 GT3	GT3 Pro-Am	444	26th	11th
2015	(Belgium) BMW Racing Against Cancer	(Belgium) Jean-Michel Martin (Belgium) Eric van de Poele (Belgium) Pascal Witmeur	BMW Z4 GT3	Pro-Am Cup	42	DNF	DNF
2019	(Belgium) 1969 Tribute	(Belgium) Loïc Deman (Belgium) Angelique Detavernier (Belgium) Stéphane Lémeret	Porsche 911 GT3 Cup MR	INV	94	DNF	DNF

=== 24 Hours of Nürburgring results ===
Year	Team	Co-Drivers	Car	Class	Laps	Pos.	Class Pos.
1978	(Belgium) East Belgian Racing Team	(Belgium) Georges Cremer (Belgium) Willy Braillard	Toyota Sprinter Trueno	4	110	DNF	DNF
1987	(Germany) Kamei Crew Wiesbaden	(Germany) Helmut Döring (Germany) Dieter Gartmann	BMW 635 CSi	1	11	DNF	DNF
1988	(Germany) BMW Motorsport GmbH	(Belgium) Eddy Joosen (Belgium) Eric van de Poele	BMW M3	9	40	DNF	DNF
1989	(Belgium) BMW Fina	(Belgium) Jean-Michel Martin (Belgium) Eric van de Poele	BMW M3	2	70	DNF	DNF
1992	(Germany) FINA Motorsport Team	(Venezuela) Johnny Cecotto (Germany) Christian Danner (Belgium) Jean-Michel Martin	BMW M3	12	76	1st	1st
1993	(Germany) BMW Motorsport GmbH	(Germany) Altfrid Heger (Italy) Emanuele Pirro (Italy) Roberto Ravaglia	BMW 320i	3	122	DNF	DNF
1995	(Italy) BMW Team Bigazzi	(Germany) Alexander Burgstaller (Italy) Roberto Ravaglia	BMW 320i	1	129	1st	1st
1997	(Germany) Scuderia Augustusburg Brühl	(Germany) Walter Haupt (Germany) Christian Menzel (Germany) Theo Martin	BMW 318 tds	14	79	DNF	DNF
1998	(Germany) BMW Motorsport	(Germany) Andreas Bovensiepen (Germany) Christian Menzel (Germany) Hans-Joachim Stuck	BMW 320d	2	137	1st	1st
1999	(Germany) Zakspeed Racing	(Germany) Klaus Ludwig (Germany) Hans-Jürgen Tiemann (Germany) Peter Zakowski	Chrysler Viper GTS-R	A6	143	1st	1st
2000	(Germany) Sakura 2000	(Sweden) Ingvar Carlsson (Germany) Armin Hahne	Honda S2000	A7	50	DNF	DNF
2001		(Germany) Armin Hahne (Germany) Klaus Niedzwiedz (Austria) Karl Wendlinger	Honda NSX	A5	17	DNF	DNF
2003	(Germany) BMW Motorsport	(Denmark) John Nielsen (United States) Boris Said (Germany) Hans-Joachim Stuck	BMW M3 GTR	E1	69	DNF	DNF
2003	(Germany) BMW Motorsport	(Germany) Claudia Hürtgen (Germany) Dirk Müller (Germany) Jörg Müller	BMW M3 GTR	E1	126	DNF	DNF
2005	(Japan) NPO Moto-CP	(Japan) Hitoshi Gotoh (Japan) Yasushi Kikuchi (Japan) Kanami Takeda	Lexus RX 400h	S1	107	79th	13th

=== 24 Hours of Zolder results ===
Year	Team	Co-Drivers	Car	Class	Laps	Pos.	Class Pos.
1995		(Belgium) Philippe "Davit" Bervoets (Belgium) Jean-Paul Libert	Porsche 911 Carrera RS	Z		10th	
1996		(Belgium) Michel Neugarten (Belgium) Patrick Snijers	Porsche 993			2nd	2nd
1997		(Belgium) Daniël Hubert (Belgium) Patrick Hubert	BMW M3	2	554	24th	2nd
1998	(Belgium) Luc Rahier	(Belgium) Daniël Hubert (Belgium) Luc Dewinter	BMW M3	T1		DNF	DNF
1999	(Belgium) GLPK Racing	(France) Stéphane Cohen (Belgium) Anthony Kumpen	Porsche 993 GT2	GT1	658	11th	4th
2000	(Belgium) GLPK Racing	(France) Stéphane Cohen (Belgium) Anthony Kumpen	Chrysler Viper GTS-R	GT	756	1st	1st
2004	(Belgium) PSI Motorsport	(Finland) Markus Palttala (Belgium) Leo Van Sande	Porsche 996 Biturbo	GTA	426	DNF	DNF
2005	(Belgium) GLPK Racing	(Netherlands) Val Hillebrand (Belgium) Bert Longin (Belgium) Anthony Kumpen	Chrysler Viper GTS-R	GTA	134	DNF	DNF
2006	(Belgium) Selleslagh Racing Team	(Belgium) Tom Cloet (Netherlands) David Hart (Belgium) Maxime Soulet	Chevrolet Corvette C5-R	Belcar 1	828	1st	1st
2007	(Belgium) GPR Racing	(Belgium) Pascal Mathieu (Belgium) Tim Verbergt	Porsche 997 GT3 Cup	Belcar 1	605	18th	10th

=== WRC results ===
Year	Entrant	Car	1	2	3	4	5	6	7	8	9	10	11	12	13	14	Pos.	Pts
1983	Things	Opel Manta GT/E	MON	SWE	POR; 16	KEN	FRA	GRC	ARG	BRA	FIN	ITA	CIV				64th	1
1983	Marc Duez	Opel Manta GT/E												GBR; Ret			64th	1
1986	Austin Rover World Championship Team	MG Metro 6R4	MON	SWE	POR; Ret	KEN	FRA	GRE	NZL	ARG	FIN	CIV	ITA; Ret	GBR; Ret	USA		NC	0
1987	Rothmans Motul BMW	BMW M3	MON	SWE	POR	KEN	FRA; 6	GRC	USA	NZL	ARG	FIN	CIV	ITA	GBR		35th	6
1988	Bastos Motul BMW	BMW M3	MON	SWE	POR	KEN	FRA; Ret	GRE	USA	NZL	ARG	FIN	CIV	ITA	GBR		NC	0
1989	BMW Fina	BMW M3	SWE	MON; 8	POR; 5	KEN	FRA; 6	GRE	NZL	ARG	FIN; 12	AUS	ITA; 7	CIV	GBR		13th	21
1990	Ford Fina Rally Team	Ford Sierra RS Cosworth	MON	POR; 8	KEN	FRA; Ret	GRE	NZL	ARG	FIN	AUS	ITA; 14	CIV	GBR; Ret			47th	3
1991	Toyota Fina Team	Celica GT-Four ST165	MON; 11	SWE	POR; Ret	KEN	FRA; 4	GRE	NZL	ARG	FIN	AUS	ITA	CIV	ESP	GBR; 8	16th	3
1998	Team Gamma	Mitsubishi Carisma GT Evo IV	MON; 20	SWE	KEN												NC	0
1998	SEAT Sport	Seat Ibiza GTi 16V				POR; Ret	ESP	FRA	ARG	GRC	NZL	FIN					NC	0
1998	SEAT Sport	Córdoba WRC											ITA; 16	AUS; Ret	GBR		NC	0
1999	Team Gamma	Mitsubishi Carisma GT Evo V	MON; 10	SWE	KEN	POR	ESP	FRA	ARG	GRE	NZL	FIN	CHN	ITA	AUS	GBR	NC	0
2014	Marc Duez	Porsche 996 GT3	MON; Ret	SWE	MEX	POR	ARG	ITA	POL	FIN	GER	AUS	FRA	ESP	GBR		NC	0
2015	Marc Duez	Porsche 996 GT3	MON; 40	SWE	MEX	ARG	POR	ITA	POL	FIN	GER	AUS	FRA	ESP	GBR		NC	0
2021	Marc Duez	Alpine A110 Rally RGT	MON	ARC	CRO	POR	ITA	KEN	EST	BEL; 34	GRE	FIN	ESP	MNZ			NC	0

=== FIA R-GT Cup results ===
Year	Entrant	Car	1	2	3	4	5	Pos.	Pts
2015	Marc Duez	Porsche 996 GT3	MON; 3	BEL; 3	GER	FRA	SUI	3rd	30

Sporting positions
Preceded by Jean-Louis Schlesser	Race of Champions; Classic Master; 1995	Succeeded by Walter Röhrl
