= Joest Racing =

Auto racing team in Germany

(Germany) Joest Racing
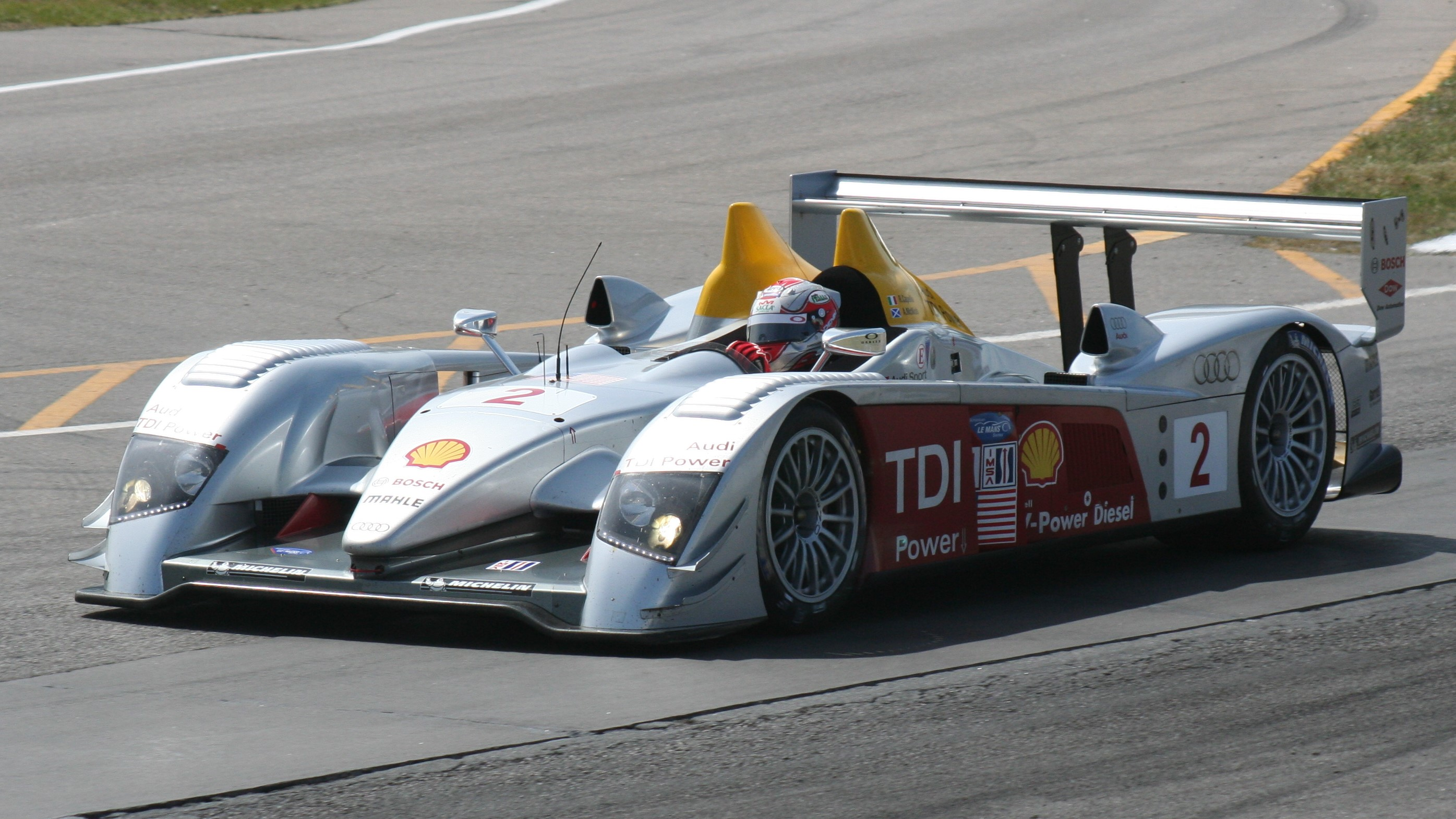
- Founded: 1978
- Base: Wald-Michelbach, Germany
- Team principal(s): Reinhold Joest
- Former series: WeatherTech SportsCar Championship; FIA World Endurance Championship; World Sportscar Championship; Deutsche Rennsport Meisterschaft; IMSA GT Championship; Deutsche Tourenwagen Meisterschaft; American Le Mans Series; Deutsche Tourenwagen Masters; Le Mans Series; Intercontinental Le Mans Cup
- Noted drivers: (Germany) Frank Biela (Italy) Rinaldo Capello (Switzerland) Marcel Fässler (Germany) Reinhold Joest (Denmark) Tom Kristensen (Germany) André Lotterer (Germany) Klaus Ludwig (United Kingdom) Allan McNish (Germany) Manuel Reuter (Italy) Emanuele Pirro (Germany) Mike Rockenfeller (France) Benoît Tréluyer (Germany) Marco Werner (Germany) "John Winter"
- Teams' Championships: 6 ('12 WEC, '13 WEC, '00, '01, '02, '03 ALMS)
- Drivers' Championships: 6 ('12 WEC, '13 WEC, '00, '01, '02, '03 ALMS)

Joest Racing is a German sports car racing team that was established in 1978 by former Porsche works racer Reinhold Joest. Their headquarters are in Wald-Michelbach, Germany.

Between 1998 and 2016, Joest Racing were strongly linked with Audi Sport GmbH and were responsible for assisting with development of their sports prototypes for participation at the 24 Hours of Le Mans, most notably the Audi R8, which scored a hat trick between 2000 and 2002. Along with the Le Mans ventures, Audi and Joest Racing also won several teams' championships together in both the American Le Mans Series and the FIA World Endurance Championship. Prior to their partnership with Audi, Joest Racing was primarily a Porsche team, winning four Le Mans races with them between 1984 and 1997. Joest Racing have also assisted Mazda and Scuderia Cameron Glickenhaus with their DPi and Le Mans Hypercar efforts respectively.

== Early years ==
As a combined driver/team owner, Reinhold Joest first began to race a Porsche 908/3 in the European Sportscar Championship, winning the driver's title. He then switched to Porsche 935s, winning the 24 Hours of Daytona in 1980. The team won the DRM back to back with driver Bob Wollek, in 1982 and 1983. During the 1982 season, whilst the Porsche 956 was only available to the works team, Joest adapted a roof onto a Porsche 936 to enter the Group C World Endurance Championship. They would race the car into the 1983 season until they took delivery of their 956 prior to Le Mans.

== Racing history ==
=== 1984–1989: Early successes ===
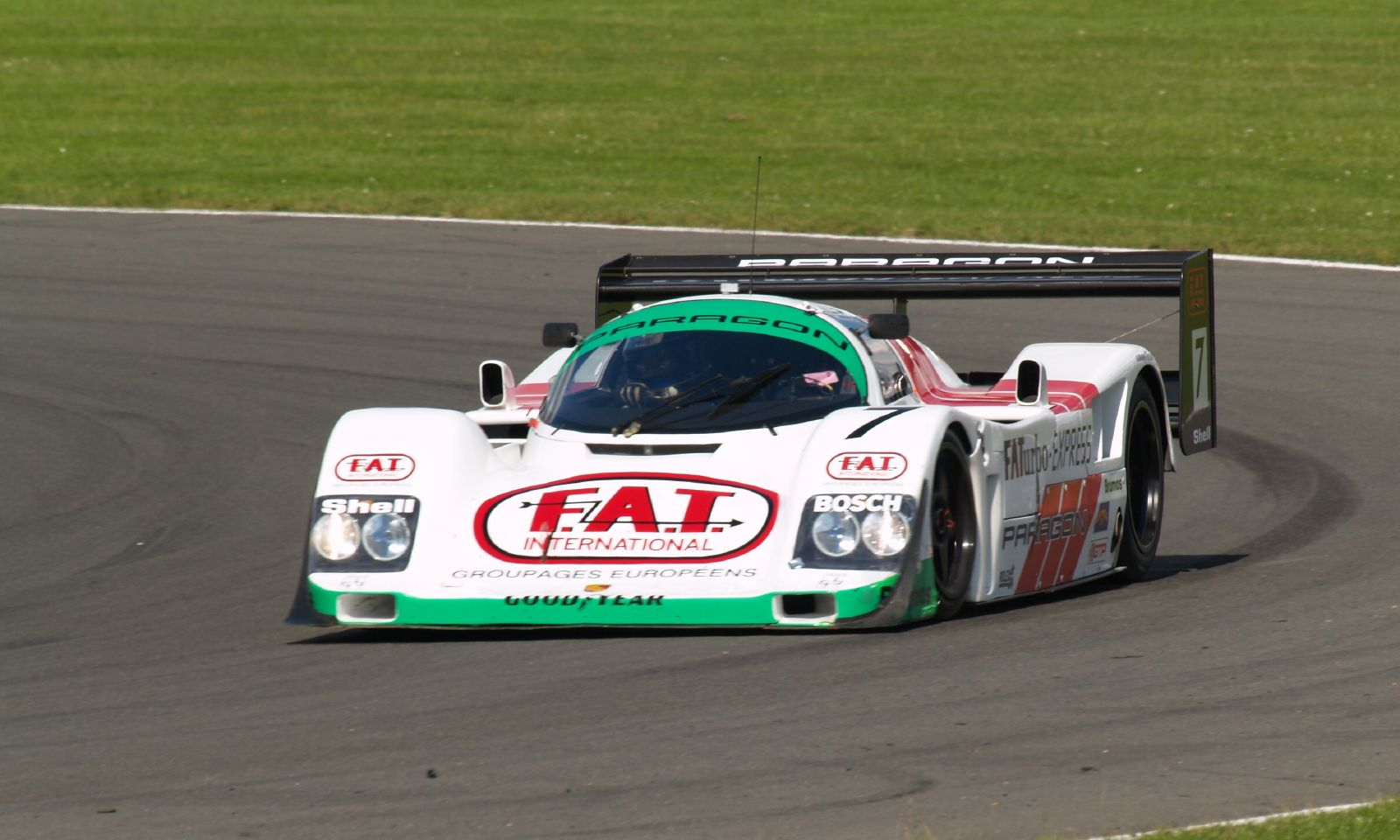
Joest Racing's Porsche 962 which they used in the IMSA GT Championship.

In 1984, in absence of the works team, Joest Racing would score the first of their fifteen wins at the 24 Hours of Le Mans, with Klaus Ludwig and Henri Pescarolo driving their "lucky #7" car a Porsche 956, chassis number 117.

In 1985, the works team returned. Despite having little factory support, Joest defended their title with Ludwig, Paolo Barilla and incognito German businessman "John Winter" driving the #7 chassis number 117 again. This would make them the second team to score back to back wins with the same car, the other being JW Automotive whose Ford GT40 Mk.I won in 1968 and 1969.

Joest won the ADAC Supercup title for teams in 1986, 1988, and 1989, while Wollek won the drivers cup in 1989. They also took the Interserie title for drivers with Winter in 1985 and Bernd Schneider in 1991, and the teams title in 1991.

In 1989, FIA introduced the new 3.5 litre Formula One engine rule to Group C, which not many teams were happy about, because few, if any, such engines were available to privateer teams like Joest. The previous fuel economy based rules were gradually phased out in favour of short races with cars that were virtually two-seater Formula 1 cars. Existing Group C cars such as Joest's Porsche 962s were given higher weights and lower fuel allocation to make them less competitive.

Joest would instead compete in the IMSA GTP category beginning in 1990. The team won the 24 Hours of Daytona in 1991 with Wollek, Pescarolo, Frank Jelinski, "Winter" and Hurley Haywood. The team would not score any more victories, as their Porsche 962 was outmoded by the Nissans, Jaguars and Toyotas.

In 1993, the Nissan and TWR Jaguar team had withdrawn from IMSA, and the AAR Eagle Toyota would continue to dominate the series final year. Joest managed to score the car's last IMSA victory at the Road America 500, due to Toyota's absence.

=== 1994–1996: DTM with Opel ===
In the 1990s, the team also had a successful career developing and racing an Opel Calibra in the Deutsche Tourenwagen Meisterschaft (DTM). They first won the ITR Gold Cup at the Donington Park round in 1994 with Manuel Reuter driving, when the leading Alfa Romeo of Alessandro Nannini was disqualified for running out of fuel. They would continue to have a successful career there by the time the series became a full-fledged international championship (ITC), winning the title for the final year in 1996 for Opel.

=== 1996–1998: Return to Le Mans ===
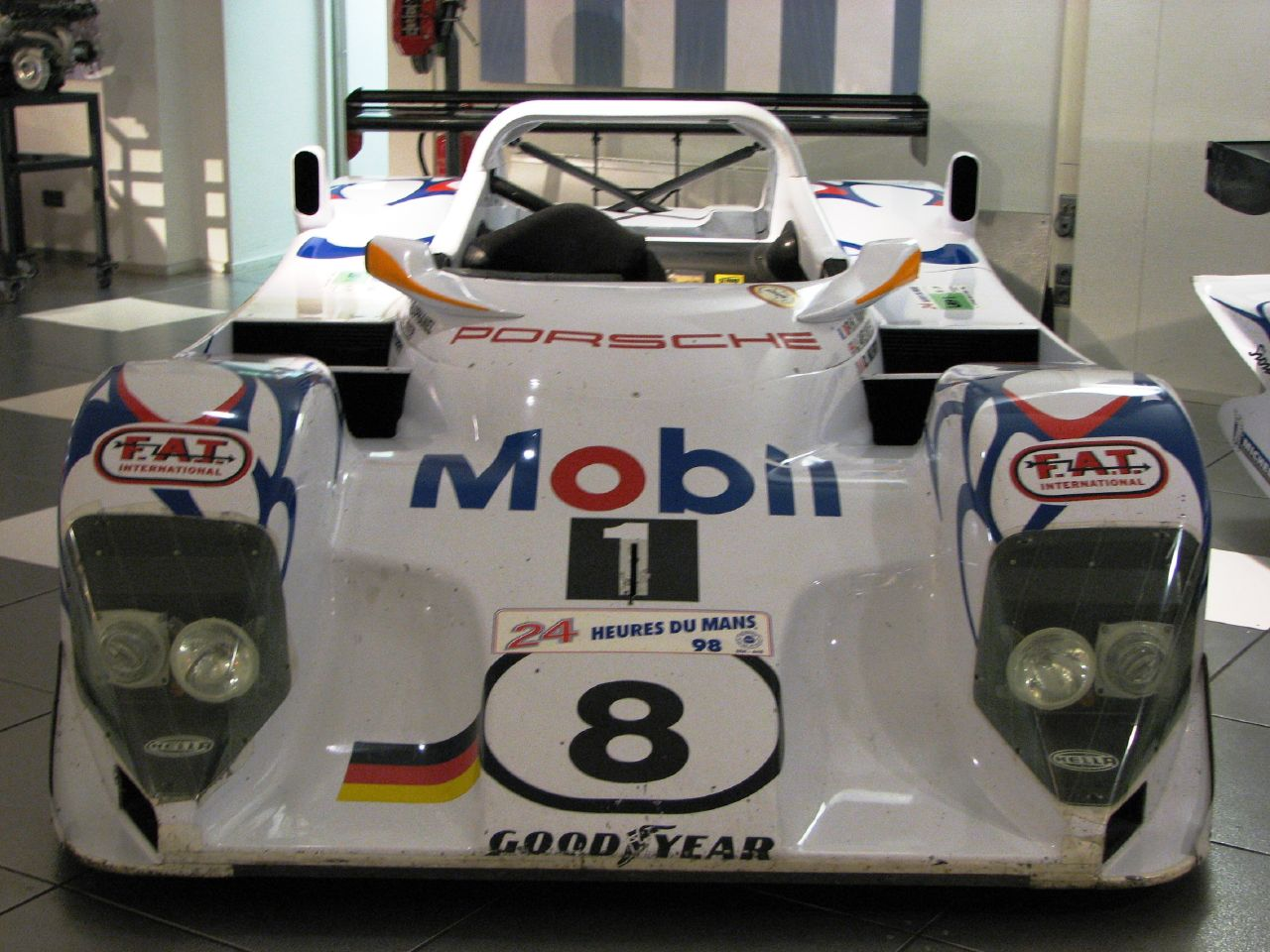
WSC-95 chassis #002 on display in its 1998 Porsche LMP1-98 guise.

In late 1995, Tom Walkinshaw Racing were commissioned by Porsche to produce a WSC car to compete in the 1996 Daytona 24-hour race. The resulting Porsche WSC-95 was based on the TWR's 1991 Jaguar XJR-14 chassis, with the roof removed and a flat-six Porsche engine fitted. The car was withdrawn because of a sudden rule change. For 1996, the concept was revived and Joest were chosen to run the WSC-95s at Le Mans as backup for Porsche's own team of works 911 GT1s. Joest won the race with Davy Jones, Manuel Reuter, and Alexander Wurz.

Joest returned in 1997, this time without works support, but again with the same car wearing #7. The winning pilots were by Michele Alboreto, Stefan Johansson and Tom Kristensen, the latter scoring the first of his nine wins. As with the #7 956 of the 1980s, Joest attempted for a third straight win, although without success, as neither car finished, while Porsche itself prevailed in the 1998 race.

=== 1998–2016: Works program with Audi ===
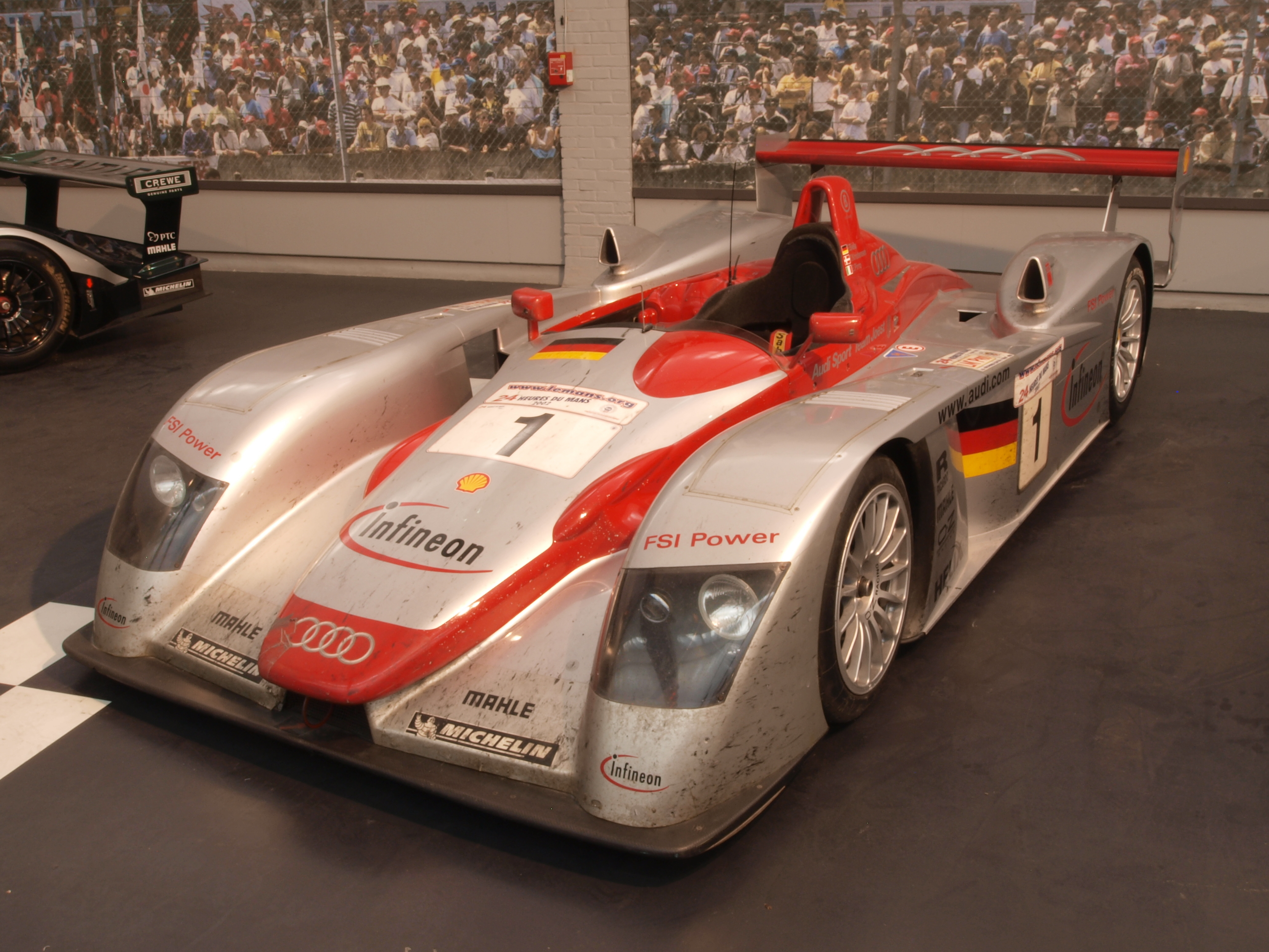
Team Joest's Audi R8, winner of the 24 Hours of Le Mans three years in a row.

In 1998, after being associated with Porsche for many years, the team signed a works contract with Audi (its CEO being Ferdinand Piëch, a grandson of Porsche) to support them for the 1999 24 Hours of Le Mans. Joest helped them build and develop the Audi R8R. Audi, not being sure which concept was the better one, also supported an LM-GTP entry, the R8C, developed by Racing Technology Norfolk. While the British R8Cs never worked properly, the two Joest R8R were reliable, yet too slow to finish better than 3rd and 4th against one of the works BMW V12 LMR and a Toyota GT-One.

Audi and Joest went back to develop the highly successful R8, winning its maiden race at the 2000 12 Hours of Sebring, and going on to win at Le Mans. Between 2000 and 2002, the R8 cars took a hat-trick of wins at Le Mans, Sebring, and Petit Le Mans, as well as American Le Mans Series titles in each year.

Audi scaled their sports car racing operation down at the end of 2002, preferring to focus their attention on the Bentley Speed 8 for a year, allowing it to win in 2003 (with support by Joest mechanics). In 2004, Audi returned to DTM touring car racing, now officially backing up the Abt Sportsline effort which had been called "private" since 2000. Joest and Abt fielded Audi A4s in the series.

In 2006, Joest began racing the new diesel-powered Audi R10 sports car. They began the 2006 season with a win at the 12 Hours of Sebring, and took also the 2006 24 Hours of Le Mans, replicating that performance a year later and again in 2008, both times against Peugeot's diesel 908 HDi FAP coupe.

In 2009, Joest and Audi introduced the Audi R15 sports car, the replacement for the R10. However, reliability issues allowed Peugeot to finish first and second at the 2009 24 Hours of Le Mans, with their 908 HDi FAP which had been perfected over its three-year history.

In an answer to the 2009 issues, Audi reworked the R15 for 2010 (under the R15 TDI plus designation) with a higher reliability factor. In the 2010 24 Hours of Le Mans, Peugeot faced unexpected reliability issues with the 908 HDi FAP, which forced all four cars (including one by Oreca) to retire before the end of the race. This resulted in a clean sweep of the podium by Joedt, with all three cars running farther than the former 1971 race record, despite that the R15s were not using the V10 TDI engines at full and were not running faster than the four 908s.

In 2011, the Audi R18 TDI won the 24 Hours of Le Mans despite the loss of two cars (both via crashes with slower GT Ferraris claiming Allan McNish in car 3 and then Mike Rockenfeller in car 1; the sole survivor, car 2, was the winner) and a ferocious pace from the opposing Peugeots. The R18s failed to win any of the other races in the Intercontinental Le Mans Cup that year, however, handing the team and drive titles to Peugeot.

Audi Sport Team Joest entered a pair of Audi R8 LMS GT3's in the 2011 Bathurst 12 Hour held at the Mount Panorama Circuit, Bathurst, Australia on 6 February. Both cars qualified on the front row with the team of Marc Basseng, Christopher Mies and Darryl O'Young leading home Australian team mates Mark Eddy, Craig Lowndes and Warren Luff in a 1-2 finish. With both cars on the same lap racing for the win, the margin was only 0.7141 between the two at the end of 12 hours of racing. The Joest Racing R8's finished one lap in front of the VIP Pet Foods Racing Porsche 997 GT3 Cup R of Craig Baird and father and son pairing Tony and Klark Quinn. It was Joest's 2nd win in Australia in two starts having previously won the ALMS Race of a Thousand Years on 31 December 2000 with Dindo Capello and Allan McNish winning in an Audi R8 LMP on the old Grand Prix circuit in Adelaide, South Australia. Capello put the R8 on pole position, while McNish was laid up with a bad back after he put it out when stepping out of his Kilt after a pre-event photo shoot. They also had to drive a repaired car after Capello put the crocodile liveried car into the tyre barriers in the race morning warm up session. Despite his troubles, McNish started the race and set the fastest lap. He also drove the 25 laps required and wrapped up the inaugural ALMS Drivers' title as a result.

For the first part of 2012, with the collapse of the Peugeot racing program, Audi ran near-unopposed in the first races of the 2012 FIA World Endurance Championship. The R18 TDI won the 2012 12 Hours of Sebring in its last race and its successor, the Audi R18 Ultra, won the 2012 6 Hours of Spa-Francorchamps with the related R18 E-Tron Quattro finishing in 2nd place. In the 2012 24 Hours of Le Mans, Joest Racing Audis won the top 3 positions with two R18 E-Tron Quattros finishing 1st and 2nd and one Audi R18 Ultra taking 3rd. After Le Mans, Audi won 2 further rounds of the FIA World Endurance Championship, the 2012 6 Hours of Silverstone and the 2012 6 Hours of Bahrain. While handing the other three rounds to Toyota, Audi would win the LMP1 Manufacturer Championship 2012 and helped Andre Lotterer, Bernoit Treleuyer and Marcel Fässler to become Driver World Endurance Champions 2012.

In late 2016, Audi Sport announced that they would leave the FIA World Endurance Championship.

=== 2017–2023: DPi and Hypercar ventures ===
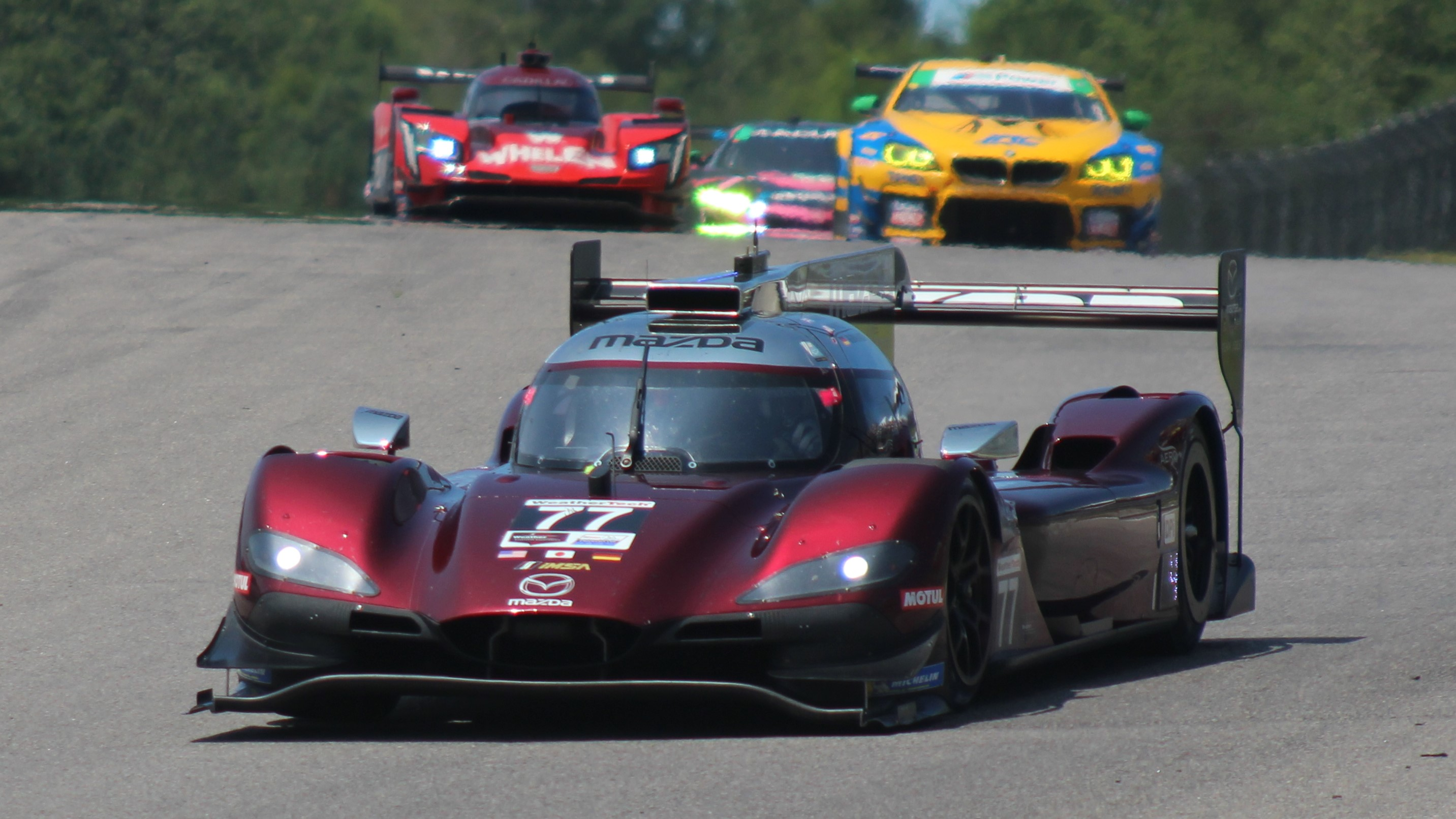
The Mazda RT24-P racing in Canadian Tire Motorsport Park.

On 18 July 2017 it was announced that Joest Racing would take over the operation of the Mazda RT24-P Daytona Prototype International (DPi) entry in the IMSA Weathertech SportsCar Championship for the 2018 season. Mazda withdrew from the remainder of the 2017 season in order for Joest to spearhead testing and development of the then uncompetitive DPi. The partnership was terminated at the end of March 2020 with Mazda moving to Multimatic Motorsports. During their partnership, Joest Racing was able to help Mazda score five victories in the series, winning at Watkins Glen, Canadian Tire Motorsport Park, Road America, Sebring, and at Daytona for the WeatherTech 240. In 2020, they also took home a podium finish at the 2020 24 Hours of Daytona, finishing in 2nd.

In 2021 it was announced that Joest Racing would work with Podium Advanced Technologies to assist in the running of Scuderia Cameron Glickenhaus' new Hypercar programme, entering two SCG 007 LMH hypercars in the 2021 FIA World Endurance Championship. Glickenhaus scored podiums at the 2022 1000 Miles of Sebring, 2022 6 Hours of Spa-Francorchamps, and 2022 24 Hours of Le Mans races, as well as two pole positions at Spa and Monza during their tenure together.

== Race results ==
=== 24 Hours of Daytona ===
Year	Entrant	No.	Car	Drivers	Class	Laps	Pos.	Class Pos.
2018	(Germany) Mazda Team Joest	55	Mazda RT24-P	(United States) Jonathan Bomarito (United States) Spencer Pigot (United Kingdom) Harry Tincknell	P	541	Ret	Ret
2018	(Germany) Mazda Team Joest	77	Mazda RT24-P	(United Kingdom) Oliver Jarvis (United States) Tristan Nunez (Germany) René Rast	P	530	Ret	Ret
2019	(Germany) Mazda Team Joest	55	Mazda RT24-P	(United States) Jonathan Bomarito (France) Olivier Pla (United Kingdom) Harry Tincknell	DPi	440	Ret	Ret
2019	(Germany) Mazda Team Joest	77	Mazda RT24-P	(Germany) Timo Bernhard (United Kingdom) Oliver Jarvis (United States) Tristan Nunez (Germany) René Rast	DPi	220	Ret	Ret
2020	(Germany) Mazda Team Joest	55	Mazda RT24-P	(United States) Jonathan Bomarito (United States) Ryan Hunter-Reay (United Kingdom) Harry Tincknell	DPi	823	6th	6th
2020	(Germany) Mazda Team Joest	77	Mazda RT24-P	(United Kingdom) Oliver Jarvis (United States) Tristan Nunez (France) Olivier Pla	DPi	833	2nd	2nd

=== 24 Hours of Le Mans ===
Year	Entrant	No.	Car	Drivers	Class	Laps	Pos.	Class Pos.
1975	(Germany) Ovoro Joest Racing	15	Porsche 908/03	(Germany) Jürgen Barth (Italy) Mario Casoni (Germany) Reinhold Joest	S 3.0	326	4th	4th
1975	(Germany) Joest Racing (Germany) Tebernum Racing	16	Porsche 911 Carrera RSR	(Germany) Hartwig Bertrams (Germany) Clemens Schickentanz	GTS	42	DNF	DNF
1976	(Germany) Joest Racing	17	Porsche 908/3 Turbo	(Germany) Ernst Kraus (Germany) Günther Steckkönig	Gr.6; S 3.0	313	7th	5th
1976	(Germany) Martini Racing Joest	18	Porsche 936	(Germany) Jürgen Barth (Germany) Reinhold Joest	Gr.6; S 3.0	218	DNF	DNF
1980	(Germany) Equipe Liqui Moly – Martini Racing	9	Porsche 908/J80	(Belgium) Jacky Ickx (Germany) Reinhold Joest	Gr.6; S 3.0	337	2nd	2nd
1981	(Germany) Joest Racing	14	Porsche 908/J80	(Belgium) Reinhold Joest (Germany) Klaus Niedzwiedz (United States) Dale Whittington	Gr.6; S +2.0	80	DNF	DNF
1981	(Germany) Joest Racing	40	Porsche 935J	(United States) Kenper Miller (Colombia) Mauricio de Narváez (Germany) Günther Steckkönig	IMSA; GTX	152	DNF	DNF
1982	(Germany) Belga Team Joest Racing	4	Porsche 936CJ	(Belgium) Jean-Michel Martin (Belgium) Philippe Martin (France) Bob Wollek	Gr.C	320	DNF	DNF
1982	(Germany) Vegla Racing Team – Joest	63	Porsche 935J	(Germany) Harald Grohs (Colombia) Mauricio de Narváez (Germany) Dieter Schornstein	Gr.5; SP	0	DNS	DNS
1983	(Germany) Sorga Joest Racing	8	Porsche 956	(Sweden) Stefan Johansson (Germany) Klaus Ludwig (France) Bob Wollek	Gr.C	355	6th	6th
1983	(Germany) Sorga Joest Racing	12	Porsche 956	(Germany) Volkert Merl (Colombia) Mauricio de Narváez (Germany) Clemens Schickentanz	Gr.C	362	4th	4th
1983	(Germany) Joest Racing Belga Team	15	Porsche 936CJ	(Belgium) Marc Duez (Belgium) Jean-Michel Martin (Belgium) Philippe Martin	Gr.C	9	DNF	DNF
1984	(Germany) NewMan Joest Racing	7	Porsche 956B	(Germany) Klaus Ludwig (France) Henri Pescarolo	Gr.C1	360	1st	1st
1984	(Germany) NewMan Joest Racing	8	Porsche 956	(Sweden) Stefan Johansson (Colombia) Mauricio de Narváez (United States) Jean-Louis Schlesser	Gr.C1	170	DNF	DNF
1984	(Germany) Schornstein Racing Team (Germany) NewMan Joest Racing	12	Porsche 956	(Germany) Volkert Merl (Germany) Dieter Schornstein (Germany) "John Winter"	Gr.C1	340	5th	5th
1985	(Germany) NewMan Joest Racing	7	Porsche 956B	(Italy) Paolo Barilla (Germany) Klaus Ludwig (Germany) "John Winter"	Gr.C1	374	1st	1st
1985	(Germany) NewMan Joest Racing	8	Porsche 956	(France) Paul Belmondo (United States) Kenper Miller (Colombia) Mauricio de Narváez	Gr.C1	277	DNF	DNF
1986	(Germany) Joest Racing	7	Porsche 956B	(Italy) Paolo Barilla (Germany) Klaus Ludwig (Germany) "John Winter"	Gr.C1	196	DNF	DNF
1986	(Germany) Joest Racing	8	Porsche 956B	(United States) George Follmer (United States) Kenper Miller (United States) John Morton	Gr.C1	355	3rd	3rd
1987	(Germany) Joest Racing	7	Porsche 962C	(United Kingdom) David Hobbs (United States) Chip Robinson (South Africa) Sarel van der Merwe	Gr.C1	4	DNF	DNF
1987	(Germany) Joest Racing	8	Porsche 962C	(Sweden) Stanley Dickens (United States) Hurley Haywood (Germany) Frank Jelinski	Gr.C1	7	DNF	DNF
1987	(Germany) Joest Racing	9	Porsche 962C	(Sweden) Stanley Dickens (United Kingdom) David Hobbs (South Africa) Sarel van der Merwe (Germany) "John Winter"	Gr.C1	0	DNS	DNS
1988	(Germany) Blaupunkt Joest Racing	7	Porsche 962C	(United Kingdom) David Hobbs (Austria) Franz Konrad (Belgium) Didier Theys	Gr.C1	380	5th	5th
1988	(Germany) Blaupunkt Joest Racing	8	Porsche 962C	(Sweden) Stanley Dickens (Germany) Frank Jelinski (Germany) "John Winter"	Gr.C1	385	3rd	3rd
1989	(Germany) Joest Racing	7	Porsche 962C	(Germany) Frank Jelinski (France) Pierre-Henri Raphanel (Germany) "John Winter"	Gr.C1	124	DNF	DNF
1989	(Germany) Joest Racing	8	Porsche 962C	(France) Claude Ballot-Léna (France) Henri Pescarolo (France) Jean-Louis Ricci	Gr.C1	372	6th	6th
1989	(Germany) Joest Racing	9	Porsche 962C	(Germany) Hans-Joachim Stuck (France) Bob Wollek	Gr.C1	383	3rd	3rd
1990	(Germany) Joest Porsche Racing	6	Porsche 962C	(France) Jacques Laffite (France) Henri Pescarolo (France) Jean-Louis Ricci	Gr. C1	328	14th	14th
1990	(Germany) Joest Porsche Racing	7	Porsche 962C	(United Kingdom) Derek Bell (Germany) Frank Jelinski (Germany) Hans-Joachim Stuck	Gr. C1	350	4th	4th
1990	(Germany) Joest Porsche Racing	8	Porsche 962C	(France) Philippe Alliot (United Kingdom) Jonathan Palmer (France) Bob Wollek	Gr. C1	0	DNS	DNS
1990	(Germany) Joest Porsche Racing	9	Porsche 962C	(Sweden) Stanley Dickens (Germany) "John Winter" (France) Bob Wollek	Gr. C1	346	8th	8th
1991	(Austria) Konrad Motorsport (Germany) Joest Porsche Racing	57	Porsche 962C	(Germany) Louis Krages (France) Henri Pescarolo (Germany) Bernd Schneider	C2	197	DNF	DNF
1991	(Austria) Konrad Motorsport (Germany) Joest Porsche Racing	58	Porsche 962C	(United Kingdom) Derek Bell (Germany) Frank Jelinski (Germany) Hans-Joachim Stuck	C2	347	7th	7th
1991	(Austria) Konrad Motorsport (Germany) Joest Porsche Racing	59	Porsche 962C	(Germany) Jürgen Barth (Austria) Franz Konrad	C2	0	DNS	DNS
1993	(Germany) Joest Porsche Racing	17	Porsche 962C	(Germany) Frank Jelinski (Germany) Manuel Reuter (Germany) "John Winter"	C2	282	DNF	DNF
1993	(Germany) Joest Porsche Racing	18	Porsche 962C	(Germany) Ronny Meixner (France) Henri Pescarolo (France) Bob Wollek	C2	351	9th	4th
1994	(Germany) Le Mans Porsche Team	35	Dauer 962 Le Mans	(Belgium) Thierry Boutsen (Germany) Hans-Joachim Stuck (United States) Danny Sullivan	LMGT1	343	3rd	2nd
1994	(Germany) Le Mans Porsche Team	36	Dauer 962 Le Mans	(Italy) Mauro Baldi (France) Yannick Dalmas (United States) Hurley Haywood	LMGT1	344	1st	1st
1996	(Germany) Joest Racing	7	TWR Porsche WSC-95	(United States) Davy Jones (Germany) Manuel Reuter (Austria) Alexander Wurz	LMP1	354	1st	1st
1996	(Germany) Joest Racing	8	TWR Porsche WSC-95	(Italy) Michele Alboreto (Italy) Pierluigi Martini (Belgium) Didier Theys	LMP1	300	DNF	DNF
1997	(Germany) Joest Racing GmbH	7	TWR Porsche WSC-95	(Italy) Michele Alboreto (Sweden) Stefan Johansson (Denmark) Tom Kristensen	LMP	361	1st	1st
1998	(Germany) Porsche AG	7	Porsche LMP1-98	(Italy) Michele Alboreto (France) Yannick Dalmas (Sweden) Stefan Johansson	LMP1	107	DNF	DNF
1998	(Germany) Porsche AG	8	Porsche LMP1-98	(United States) David Murry (France) Pierre-Henri Raphanel (United Kingdom) James Weaver	LMP1	218	DNF	DNF
1999	(Germany) Audi Sport Team Joest	7	Audi R8R	(France) Laurent Aïello (Italy) Michele Alboreto (Italy) Rinaldo Capello	LMP	346	4th	3rd
1999	(Germany) Audi Sport Team Joest	8	Audi R8R	(Germany) Frank Biela (Italy) Emanuele Pirro (Belgium) Didier Theys	LMP	360	3rd	2nd
2000	(Germany) Audi Sport Team Joest	7	Audi R8	(Germany) Christian Abt (Italy) Michele Alboreto (Italy) Rinaldo Capello	LMP900	365	3rd	3rd
2000	(Germany) Audi Sport Team Joest	8	Audi R8	(Germany) Frank Biela (Denmark) Tom Kristensen (Italy) Emanuele Pirro	LMP900	368	1st	1st
2000	(Germany) Audi Sport Team Joest	9	Audi R8	(France) Laurent Aïello (United Kingdom) Allan McNish (Monaco) Stéphane Ortelli	LMP900	367	2nd	2nd
2001	(Germany) Audi Sport Team Joest	1	Audi R8	(Germany) Frank Biela (Denmark) Tom Kristensen (Italy) Emanuele Pirro	LMP900	321	1st	1st
2001	(Germany) Audi Sport North America	2	Audi R8	(France) Laurent Aïello (Italy) Rinaldo Capello (Italy) Christian Pescatori	LMP900	320	2nd	2nd
2002	(Germany) Audi Sport Team Joest	1	Audi R8	(Germany) Frank Biela (Denmark) Tom Kristensen (Italy) Emanuele Pirro	LMP900	375	1st	1st
2002	(Germany) Audi Sport Team Joest	3	Audi R8	(Germany) Michael Krumm (Austria) Philipp Peter (Germany) Marco Werner	LMP900	372	3rd	3rd
2002	(Germany) Audi Sport North America	2	Audi R8	(Italy) Rinaldo Capello (United Kingdom) Johnny Herbert (Italy) Christian Pescatori	LMP900	374	2nd	2nd
2003	(United Kingdom) Team Bentley	7	Bentley Speed 8	(Italy) Rinaldo Capello (Denmark) Tom Kristensen (United Kingdom) Guy Smith	LMGTP	377	1st	1st
2003	(United Kingdom) Team Bentley	8	Bentley Speed 8	(United Kingdom) Mark Blundell (Australia) David Brabham (United Kingdom) Johnny Herbert	LMGTP	375	2nd	2nd
2006	(Germany) Audi Sport Team Joest	7	Audi R10 TDI	(Italy) Rinaldo Capello (Denmark) Tom Kristensen (United Kingdom) Allan McNish	LMP1	367	3rd	3rd
2006	(Germany) Audi Sport Team Joest	8	Audi R10 TDI	(Germany) Frank Biela (Italy) Emanuele Pirro (Germany) Marco Werner	LMP1	380	1st	1st
2007	(Germany) Audi Sport North America	1	Audi R10 TDI	(Germany) Frank Biela (Italy) Emanuele Pirro (Germany) Marco Werner	LMP1	369	1st	1st
2007	(Germany) Audi Sport North America	2	Audi R10 TDI	(Italy) Rinaldo Capello (Denmark) Tom Kristensen (United Kingdom) Allan McNish	LMP1	262	DNF	DNF
2007	(Germany) Audi Sport Team Joest	3	Audi R10 TDI	(Germany) Lucas Luhr (France) Alexandre Prémat (Germany) Mike Rockenfeller	LMP1	23	DNF	DNF
2008	(Germany) Audi Sport North America	1	Audi R10 TDI	(Germany) Frank Biela (Italy) Emanuele Pirro (Germany) Marco Werner	LMP1	367	6th	6th
2008	(Germany) Audi Sport North America	2	Audi R10 TDI	(Italy) Rinaldo Capello (Denmark) Tom Kristensen (United Kingdom) Allan McNish	LMP1	381	1st	1st
2008	(Germany) Audi Sport Team Joest	3	Audi R10 TDI	(Germany) Lucas Luhr (France) Alexandre Prémat (Germany) Mike Rockenfeller	LMP1	374	4th	4th
2009	(Germany) Audi Sport Team Joest	1	Audi R15 TDI	(Italy) Rinaldo Capello (Denmark) Tom Kristensen (United Kingdom) Allan McNish	LMP1	376	3rd	3rd
2009	(Germany) Audi Sport Team Joest	3	Audi R15 TDI	(Germany) Timo Bernhard (France) Romain Dumas (France) Alexandre Prémat	LMP1	333	17th	13th
2009	(Germany) Audi Sport North America	2	Audi R15 TDI	(Germany) Lucas Luhr (Germany) Mike Rockenfeller (Germany) Marco Werner	LMP1	104	DNF	DNF
2010	(Germany) Audi Sport Team Joest	7	Audi R15 TDI plus	(Italy) Rinaldo Capello (Denmark) Tom Kristensen (United Kingdom) Allan McNish	LMP1	394	3rd	3rd
2010	(Germany) Audi Sport Team Joest	8	Audi R15 TDI plus	(Switzerland) Marcel Fässler (Germany) André Lotterer (France) Benoît Tréluyer	LMP1	396	2nd	2nd
2010	(Germany) Audi Sport North America	9	Audi R15 TDI plus	(Germany) Timo Bernhard (France) Romain Dumas (Germany) Mike Rockenfeller	LMP1	397	1st	1st
2011	(Germany) Audi Sport Team Joest	1	Audi R18 TDI	(Germany) Timo Bernhard (France) Romain Dumas (Germany) Mike Rockenfeller	LMP1	116	DNF	DNF
2011	(Germany) Audi Sport Team Joest	2	Audi R18 TDI	(Switzerland) Marcel Fässler (Germany) André Lotterer (France) Benoît Tréluyer	LMP1	355	1st	1st
2011	(Germany) Audi Sport North America	3	Audi R18 TDI	(Italy) Rinaldo Capello (Denmark) Tom Kristensen (United Kingdom) Allan McNish	LMP1	14	DNF	DNF
2012	(Germany) Audi Sport Team Joest	1	Audi R18 e-tron quattro	(Switzerland) Marcel Fässler (Germany) André Lotterer (France) Benoît Tréluyer	LMP1	378	1st	1st
2012	(Germany) Audi Sport Team Joest	2	Audi R18 e-tron quattro	(Italy) Rinaldo Capello (Denmark) Tom Kristensen (United Kingdom) Allan McNish	LMP1	377	2nd	2nd
2012	(Germany) Audi Sport Team Joest	3	Audi R18 e-tron ultra	(France) Romain Dumas (France) Loïc Duval (Spain) Marc Gené	LMP1	366	5th	5th
2012	(Germany) Audi Sport North America	4	Audi R18 e-tron ultra	(Italy) Marco Bonanomi (United Kingdom) Oliver Jarvis (Germany) Mike Rockenfeller	LMP1	375	3rd	3rd
2013	(Germany) Audi Sport Team Joest	1	Audi R18 e-tron quattro	(Switzerland) Marcel Fässler (Germany) André Lotterer (France) Benoît Tréluyer	LMP1	338	5th	5th
2013	(Germany) Audi Sport Team Joest	2	Audi R18 e-tron quattro	(France) Loïc Duval (Denmark) Tom Kristensen (United Kingdom) Allan McNish	LMP1	348	1st	1st
2013	(Germany) Audi Sport Team Joest	3	Audi R18 e-tron quattro	(Brazil) Lucas di Grassi (Spain) Marc Gené (United Kingdom) Oliver Jarvis	LMP1	347	3rd	3rd
2014	(Germany) Audi Sport Team Joest	1	Audi R18 e-tron quattro	(Brazil) Lucas di Grassi (Spain) Marc Gené (Note: Loïc Duval was driving the No. 1 Audi when he was injured in a Wednesday practice accident. Following Wednesday qualifying, Duval was not cleared to participate in the race and was replaced by Audi reserve driver Marc Gené, who was set to drive for Jota Sport in LMP2.) (Denmark) Tom Kristensen	LMP1-H	376	2nd	2nd
2014	(Germany) Audi Sport Team Joest	2	Audi R18 e-tron quattro	(Switzerland) Marcel Fässler (Germany) André Lotterer (France) Benoît Tréluyer	LMP1-H	379	1st	1st
2014	(Germany) Audi Sport Team Joest	3	Audi R18 e-tron quattro	(Portugal) Filipe Albuquerque (Italy) Marco Bonanomi (United Kingdom) Oliver Jarvis	LMP1-H	25	DNF	DNF
2015	(Germany) Audi Sport Team Joest	7	Audi R18 e-tron quattro	(Switzerland) Marcel Fässler (Germany) André Lotterer (France) Benoît Tréluyer	LMP1	393	3rd	3rd
2015	(Germany) Audi Sport Team Joest	8	Audi R18 e-tron quattro	(Brazil) Lucas di Grassi (France) Loïc Duval (United Kingdom) Oliver Jarvis	LMP1	392	4th	4th
2015	(Germany) Audi Sport Team Joest	9	Audi R18 e-tron quattro	(Portugal) Filipe Albuquerque (Italy) Marco Bonanomi (Germany) René Rast	LMP1	387	7th	7th
2016	(Germany) Audi Sport Team Joest	7	Audi R18	(Switzerland) Marcel Fässler (Germany) André Lotterer (France) Benoît Tréluyer	LMP1	367	4th	4th
2016	(Germany) Audi Sport Team Joest	8	Audi R18	(Brazil) Lucas di Grassi (France) Loïc Duval (United Kingdom) Oliver Jarvis	LMP1	372	3rd	3rd
2021	(United States) Glickenhaus Racing	708	Glickenhaus SCG 007 LMH	(Brazil) Pipo Derani (France) Franck Mailleux (France) Olivier Pla	Hypercar	367	4th	4th
2021	(United States) Glickenhaus Racing	709	Glickenhaus SCG 007 LMH	(Australia) Ryan Briscoe (France) Romain Dumas (United Kingdom) Richard Westbrook	Hypercar	364	5th	5th
2022	(United States) Glickenhaus Racing	708	Glickenhaus SCG 007 LMH	(Brazil) Pipo Derani (France) Romain Dumas (France) Olivier Pla	Hypercar	370	4th	4th
2022	(United States) Glickenhaus Racing	709	Glickenhaus SCG 007 LMH	(Australia) Ryan Briscoe (France) Franck Mailleux (United Kingdom) Richard Westbrook	Hypercar	375	3rd	3rd
2023	(United States) Glickenhaus Racing	708	Glickenhaus SCG 007 LMH	(Australia) Ryan Briscoe (France) Romain Dumas (France) Olivier Pla	Hypercar	335	6th	6th
2023	(United States) Glickenhaus Racing	709	Glickenhaus SCG 007 LMH	(France) Nathanaël Berthon (Mexico) Esteban Gutiérrez (France) Franck Mailleux	Hypercar	333	7th	7th

=== WeatherTech SportsCar Championship wins ===
#	Season	Date	Classes	Track / Race	No.	Winning drivers	Chassis	Engine
1	2019	June 30	(DPi)	Watkins Glen	55	(United States) Jonathan Bomarito / (France) Olivier Pla / (United Kingdom) Harry Tincknell	Mazda RT24-P	Mazda MZ-2.0T 2.0 L Turbo I4
2	2019	July 7	(DPi)	Mosport	77	(United Kingdom) Oliver Jarvis / (United States) Tristan Nunez	Mazda RT24-P	Mazda MZ-2.0T 2.0 L Turbo I4
3	2019	August 4	(DPi)	Road America	55	(United States) Jonathan Bomarito / (United Kingdom) Harry Tincknell	Mazda RT24-P	Mazda MZ-2.0T 2.0 L Turbo I4
