= Maxime Martin =

Belgian racing driver (born 1986)

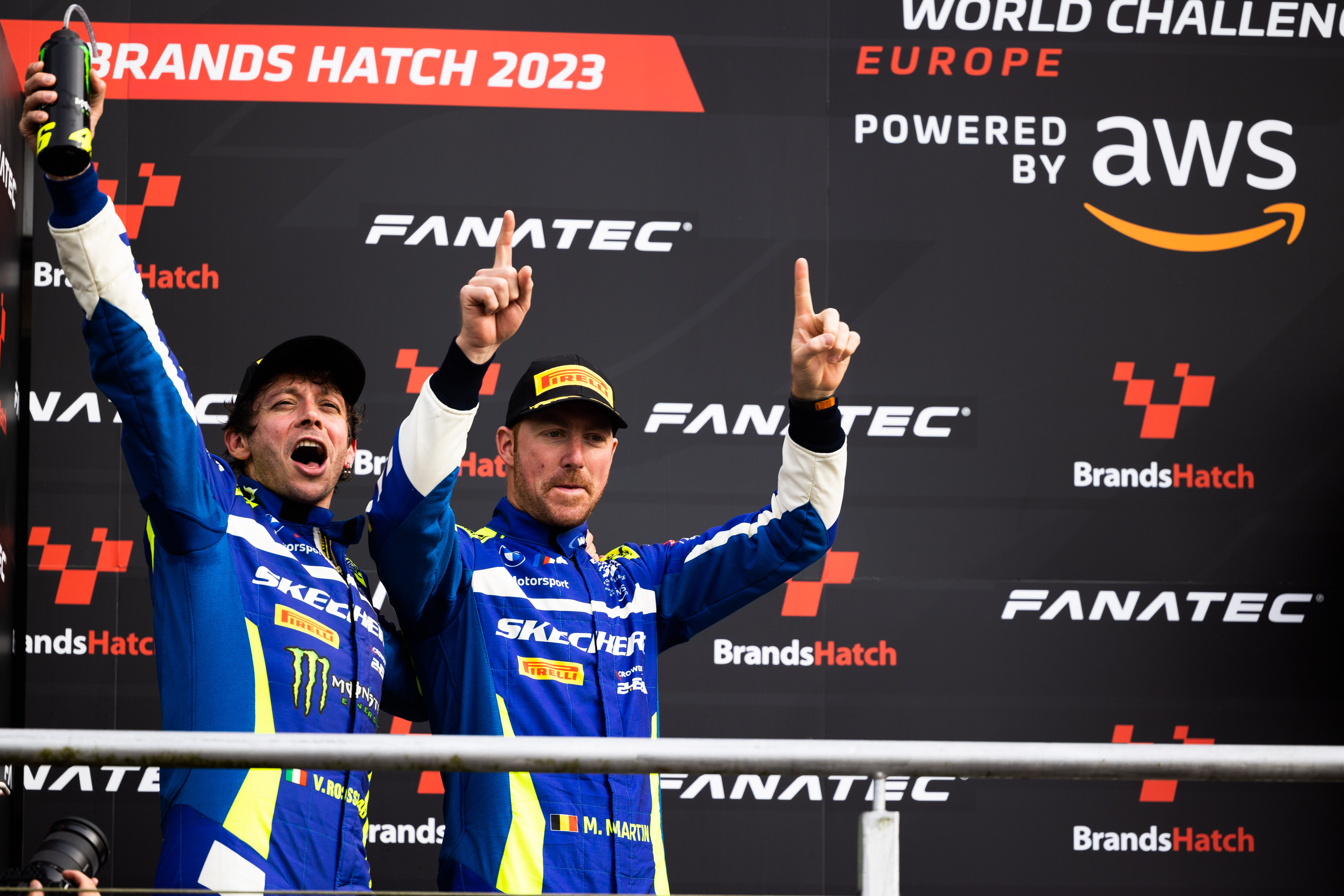
- Martin (right) with his teammate Valentino Rossi on the podium at the GT World Challenge Europe Brands Hatch round in 2023
- Nationality: (Belgium) Belgian
- Born: Maxime Ariane Pascal Martin; 20 March 1986 (age 40) Uccle, Belgium

FIA World Endurance Championship career
- Debut season: 2013
- Current team: Iron Lynx
- Categorisation: FIA Gold (until 2012); FIA Platinum (2013–)
- Former teams: TDS Racing, Aston Martin Racing, Hub Auto Racing, DKR Engineering, Team WRT
- Starts: 43
- Wins: 2
- Poles: 1
- Fastest laps: 3
- Best finish: 2nd in 2019-20 FIA World Endurance Championship

Previous series
- 2006 2007 2007 2007, 09 2007–08 2008 2008 2008–09 2008–10 2009 2009 2009 2010–12 2010 2013 2013 2014-17: Formula Renault 1.6 Belgium; French Formula Renault; THP Spider Cup; GT4 European Cup; Eurocup Mégane Trophy; FIA GT Championship; Renault Clio Cup France; Renault Clio Cup Belgium; FIA GT3 Championship; Formula Le Mans; Belgian GT Championship; ADAC GT Masters; FIA GT1 World Championship; French GT Championship; Blancpain Endurance Series; American Le Mans Series; DTM

Championship titles
- 2008: Clio Cup France
24 Hours of Le Mans career
- Years: 2011–2013, 2018–
- Teams: Kronos Racing, Marc VDS Racing Team, OAK Racing, TDS Racing, Aston Martin Racing, Hub Auto Racing
- Best finish: 7th (2011)
- Class wins: 1 (2020)

Maxime Ariane Pascal Martin (born 20 March 1986) is a Belgian professional racing driver competing in the FIA World Endurance Championship with Iron Lynx. He is currently a Mercedes-AMG factory driver, having previously been so for BMW in two different spells and Aston Martin. He won the 2016 24 Hours of Spa for BMW, the 2020 24 Hours of Le Mans in GTE Pro for Aston Martin, and the 2026 24 Hours of Nürburgring for Mercedes-AMG. He is also an FIA GT1 World Championship, GT World Challenge Europe, American Le Mans Series and DTM race winner.

He is the son of four-time Spa 24 Hours winner Jean-Michel Martin.

== Early career ==
Born in Uccle, Martin finished fourth in 2006 in the Formula Renault 1.6 Belgium series. In 2007, he began racing in the Eurocup Mégane Trophy, finishing third overall with one victory. The following year, he finished as runner-up, with six wins. He also won the French Renault Clio Cup title. In 2009, he raced mainly in the FIA GT3 European Championship for AutoGT Racing in a Morgan Aero 8, winning at Silverstone.

== Sportscar racing ==
For 2010, Martin began racing in the new FIA GT1 World Championship for the Marc VDS Racing Team in a Ford GT. Along with teammate Bas Leinders he scored two podium finishes and ended the season 14th in the standings. In 2011, Martin teamed with Frédéric Makowiecki to win four races, including both rounds at Ordos. Between 2011 and 2013, Martin raced in the Blancpain Endurance Series mainly driving a BMW Z4 GT3 also for the Marc VDS Racing Team. His best result came in 2012, where he finished runner-up together with his teammates Bas Leinders and Markus Palttala.

=== BMW factory driver (2013–2017) ===
After strong results in the Blancpain Endurance Series driving the BMW Z4 GT3, Martin was promoted to a factory driver for 2013. In 2013, Martin mainly competed in the American Le Mans Series with BMW Team RLL in the all new BMW Z4 GTE. He and his teammate Bill Auberlen won in only the second race and finished sixth in the Drivers' standings.

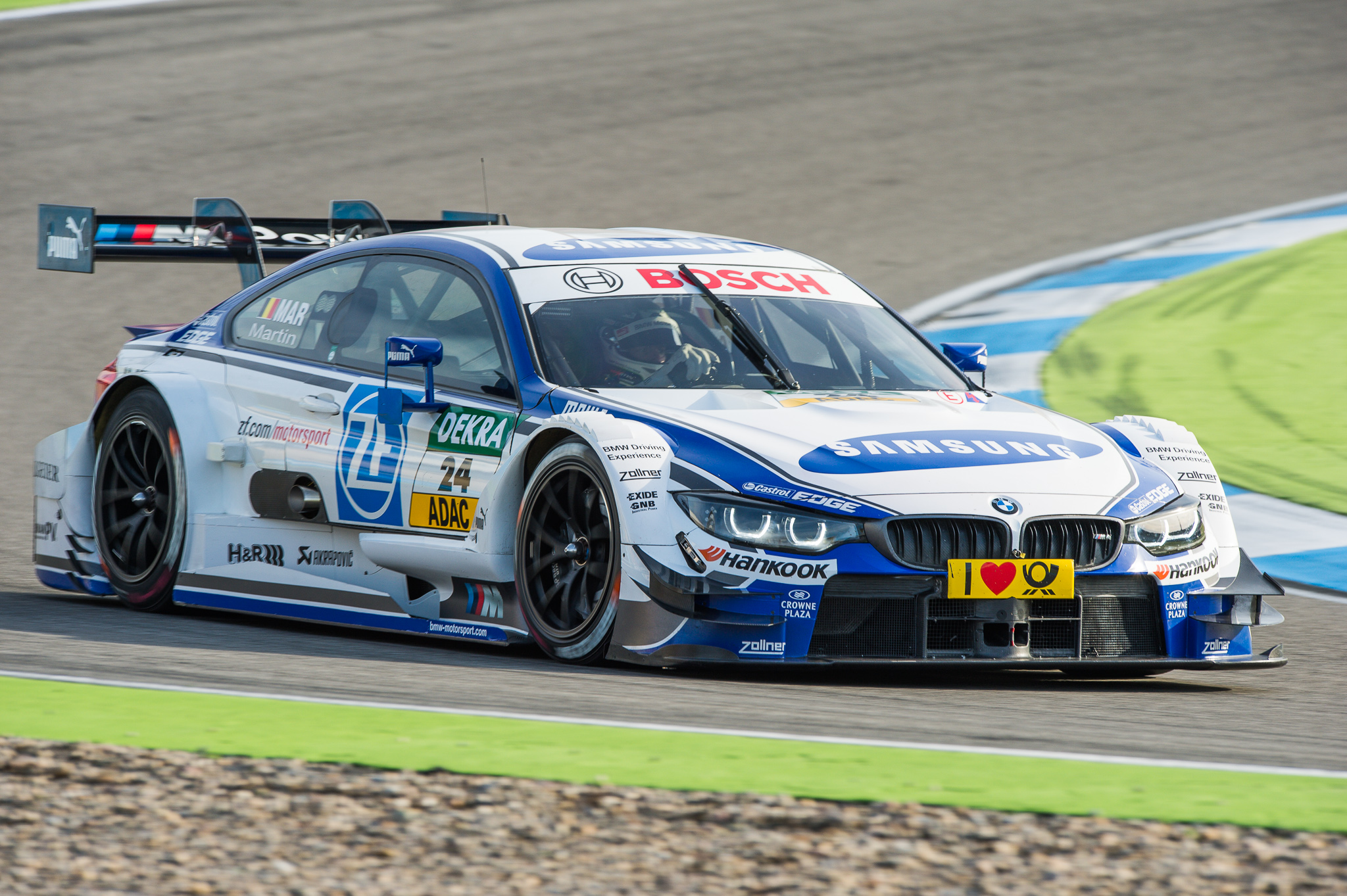
Martin racing in the 2014 DTM for BMW.

In 2014, Martin made his debut in the DTM championship for BMW. He won a race at the Moscow Raceway, the first victory for a Belgian in the DTM. In 2015, he won another race, this time at the Nürburgring. In 2016, he only managed to finish twice on the podium, and ended the year winless. 2017 was his most successful season yet in the DTM, ending the season with one victory and four podiums.

In 2016, Martin won the Spa 24 Hours together with Alexander Sims and Philipp Eng, driving a BMW M6 GT3. By winning this race, he followed in the footsteps of his father Jean-Michel Martin, who won the race four times, and his uncle Philippe, who won twice alongside Jean-Michel.

=== Aston Martin Racing factory driver (2018–2022) ===
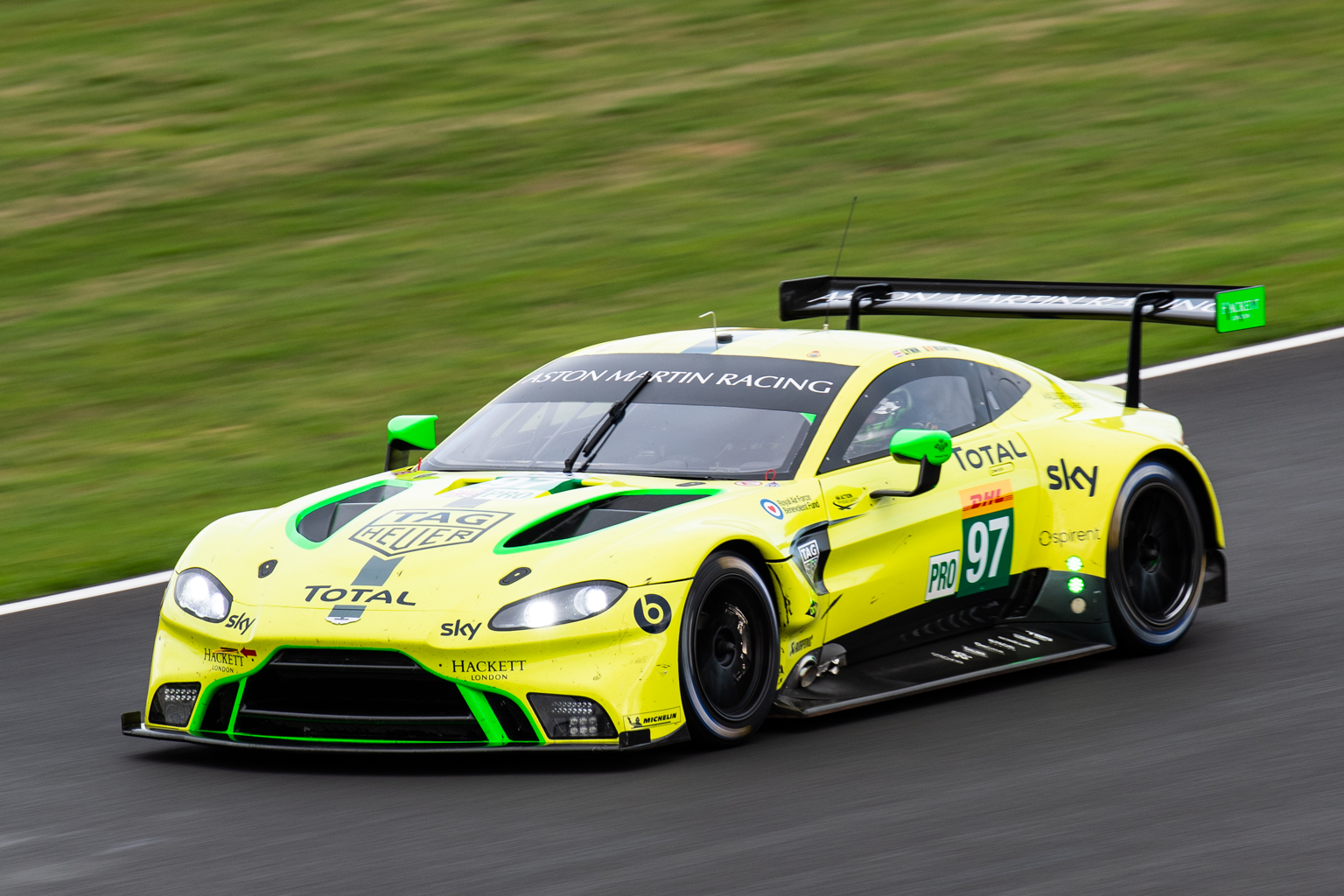
Martin racing in the 2018 6 Hours of Silverstone.

In late 2017, Martin announced he would leave BMW after five years as a factory driver. He later announced he would join Aston Martin Racing as a factory driver to race in the 2018-19 FIA World Endurance Championship. In September 2020, Martin won the 24 Hours of Le Mans in the LMGTE Pro class together with Alex Lynn and Harry Tincknell for Aston Martin Racing. He took four more podiums during the season and finished runner-up in the Drivers' standings.

While Aston Martin Racing officially ended its factory involvement in the FIA WEC after the 2019-2020 season, Martin was retained as a factory driver to support the customer racing program. However, due to a lack of opportunities in 2021, he raced on Porsche cars on several occasions. In 2022, Martin raced in the IMSA WeatherTech SportsCar Championship on an Aston Martin Vantage GT3 from The Heart of Racing Team. This marked his return to a full time program in North America for the first time since 2013. Martin ended up winning two races in the GTD class during the season, one of which was the 6 Hours of Watkins Glen, helping his teammate Roman De Angelis win the title. At the end of the season, he and Aston Martin decided to part ways after five seasons.

=== Return to BMW Motorsport (2023-2024) ===
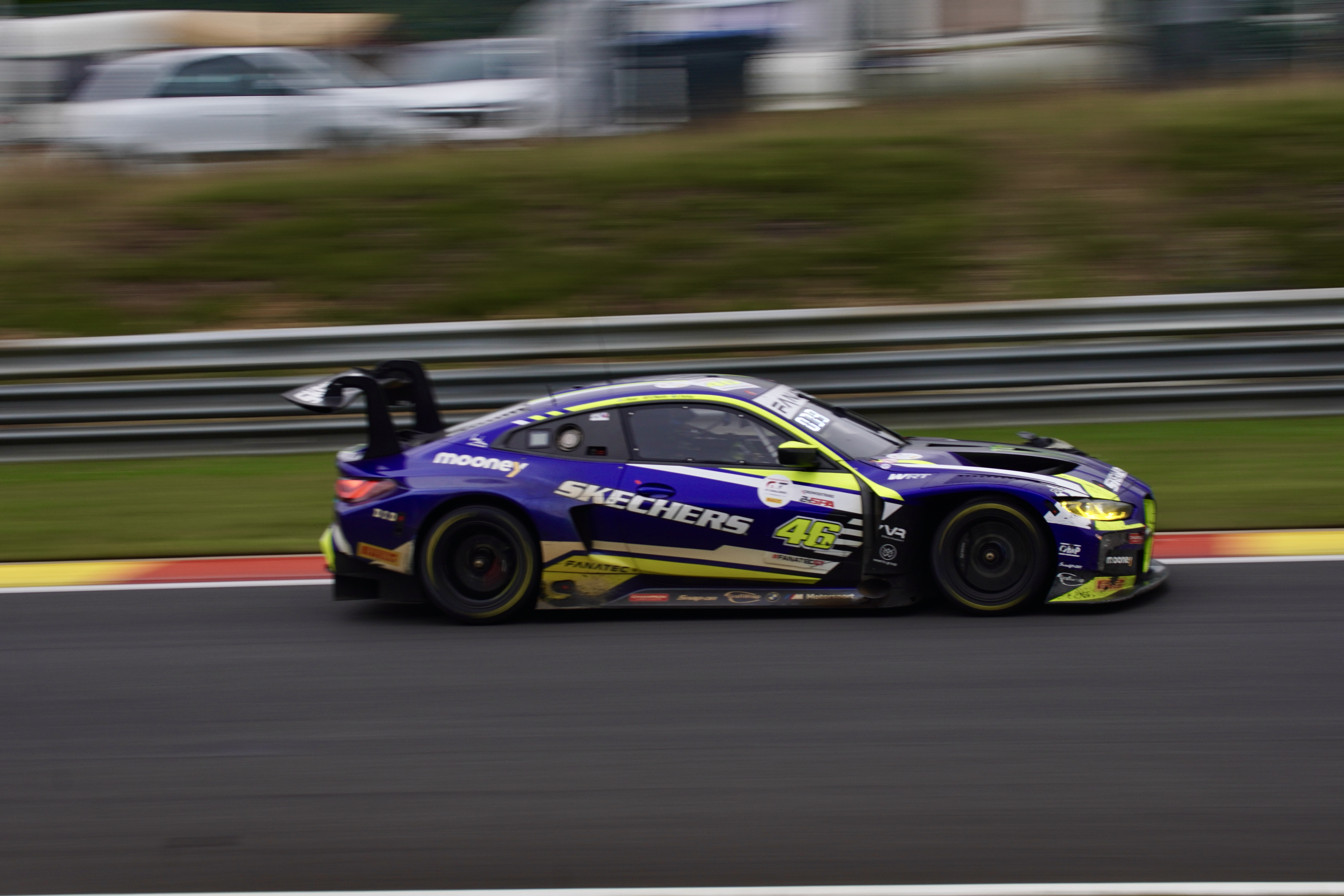
The #46 BMW M4 GT3 from Team WRT driven by Martin, Rossi and Farfus at the 2023 24 Hours of Spa

On October 26, 2022, it was announced that Martin would return to the squad of BMW factory drivers. In 2023, Martin would mainly compete in the GT World Challenge Europe series partnering MotoGP legend Valentino Rossi driving a BMW M4 GT3 for Team WRT. Beside his GT program, Martin would also be involved in WRT's testing program of the BMW M Hybrid V8. On July 16, he and Rossi won the second sprint race at the Misano circuit which marked Rossi's maiden win in the championship.

=== Mercedes-AMG factory driver (since 2025) ===
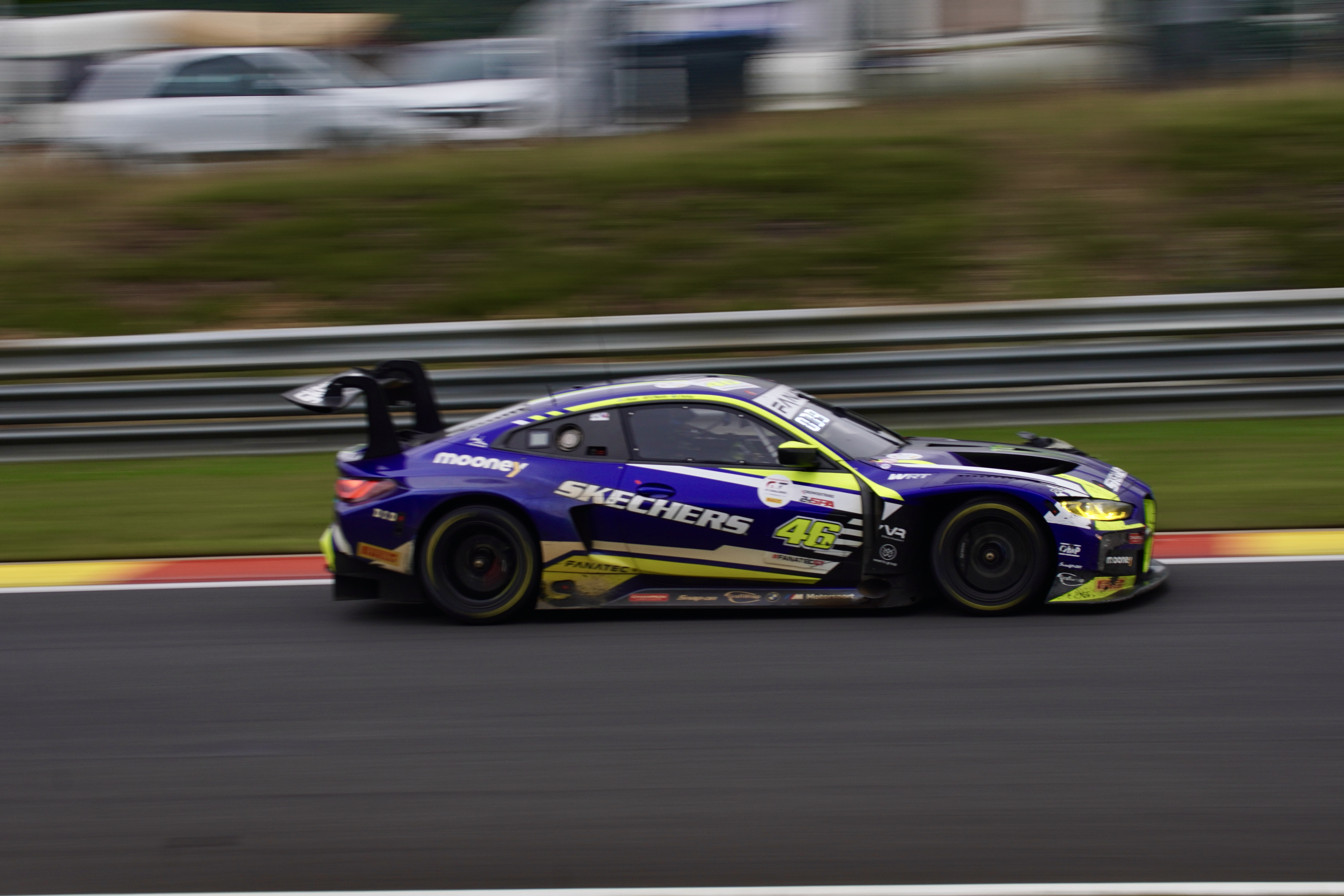
The #46 BMW M4 GT3 from Team WRT driven by Martin, Rossi and Farfus at the 2023 24 Hours of Spa

In 2025, Martin became factory driver for Mercedes-AMG. His most notable achievement with the team was winning the 2026 24 Hours of Nürburgring alongside Maro Engel, Fabian Schiller, and Luca Stolz.

== Racing record ==
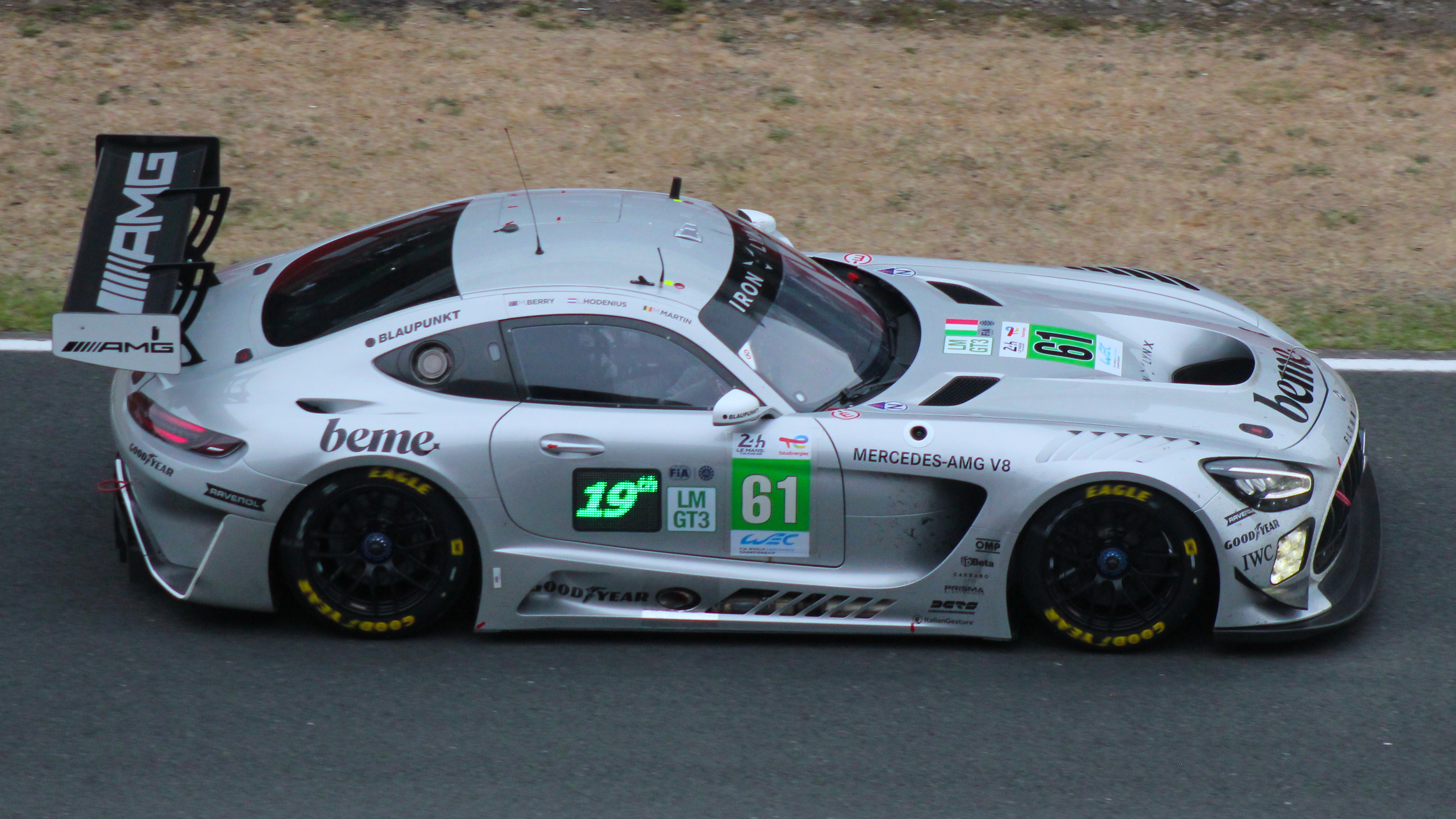
Martin's No. 61 car at the 2025 24 Hours of Le Mans

=== Career summary ===
Season	Series	Team	Races	Wins	Poles	F/Laps	Podiums	Points	Position
2007	French Formula Renault 2.0	Boutsen Ginion Racing	2	0	0	0	0	0	35th
2007	Eurocup Mégane Trophy	Boutsen Energy Racing	13	1	2	1	4	85	**3rd**
2008	FIA GT Championship - GT2	Belgian Racing	1	0	0	0	0	0†	NC†
2008	FIA GT3 European Championship	Auto GT Racing	1	0	0	0	0	0	NC
2008	Eurocup Mégane Trophy	Boutsen Energy Racing	14	6	2	1	10	154	**2nd**
2008	Renault Clio Cup France	Boutsen Energy Racing	14	?	?	?	?	117	**1st**
2009	FIA GT3 European Championship	Auto GT Racing	12	1	0	0	2	23	16th
2009	ADAC GT Masters	Alpina	2	2	0	0	2	0†	NC†
2010	FIA GT1 World Championship	Marc VDS Racing Team	20	0	0	0	2	54	14th
2010	FIA GT3 European Championship	Marc VDS Racing Team	3	0	0	0	0	12	28th
2011	FIA GT1 World Championship	Marc VDS Racing Team	20	4	3	0	5	98	6th
2011	Blancpain Endurance Series - Pro Cup	Marc VDS Racing Team	5	2	1	0	3	69	5th
2011	FIA GT3 European Championship	Team LMP Motorsport	12	0	0	0	3	81	7th
2011	24 Hours of Le Mans - LMP1	Kronos Racing	1	0	0	0	0	N/A	7th
2012	FIA GT1 World Championship	Valmon Racing Team Russia	6	0	0	0	0	0	28th
2012	ADAC GT Masters	Alpina	16	3	2	3	5	134	4th
2012	Blancpain Endurance Series - Pro Cup	Marc VDS Racing Team	6	2	1	0	3	111	**2nd**
2012	24 Hours of Nürburgring - SP9	Marc VDS Racing Team	1	0	0	0	0	N/A	4th
2012	24 Hours of Le Mans - LMP2	OAK Racing	1	0	0	0	0	N/A	7th
2013	American Le Mans Series - GT	BMW Team RLL	9	1	0	0	1	86	6th
2013	Rolex Sports Car Series - GT	Turner Motorsport	2	0	0	0	1	46	46th
2013	FIA GT Series	Marc VDS Racing	2	0	0	0	0	0†	NC†
2013	Blancpain Endurance Series - Pro Cup	Marc VDS Racing	5	1	0	0	2	71	**3rd**
2013	24 Hours of Nürburgring - SP9	Marc VDS Racing	1	0	0	0	1	N/A	**2nd**
2013	24 Hours of Le Mans - LMP2	TDS Racing	1	0	0	0	0	N/A	DNF
2014	United SportsCar Championship - GTLM	BMW Team RLL	1	0	0	0	1	33	28th
2014	Deutsche Tourenwagen Masters	BMW Team RMG	10	1	0	0	1	47	7th
2014	Blancpain Endurance Series - Pro Cup	BMW Sports Trophy Team Marc VDS	1	0	0	0	0	0	NC
2014	24 Hours of Nürburgring - SP9	BMW Sports Trophy Team Marc VDS	1	0	0	0	0	N/A	DNF
2015	Deutsche Tourenwagen Masters	BMW Team RMG	18	1	1	1	3	94	7th
2015	Blancpain Endurance Series - Pro Cup	BMW Sports Trophy Team Marc VDS	2	0	0	0	1	33	9th
2015	24 Hours of Nürburgring - SP9	BMW Sports Trophy Team Marc VDS	1	0	0	0	1	N/A	**2nd**
2015	Blancpain Sprint Series	BMW Sports Trophy Team Brasil	2	1	1	1	2	31	14th
2016	IMSA SportsCar Championship - GTD	Turner Motorsport	1	0	0	0	0	27	43rd
2016	Stock Car Brasil Championship	TMG Racing	1	0	0	0	0	0†	NC†
2016	Deutsche Tourenwagen Masters	BMW Team RBM	18	0	0	0	2	90	8th
2016	Blancpain GT Series Endurance Cup	Rowe Racing	2	1	0	0	1	55	5th
2016	24 Hours of Nürburgring - SP9	Rowe Racing	1	0	0	0	0	N/A	5th
2016	Blancpain GT Series Sprint Cup	Boutsen Ginion	2	0	0	0	0	4	26th
2016	Blancpain GT Series Sprint Cup	Rowe Racing	2	0	0	0	0	4	26th
2017	IMSA SportsCar Championship - GTD	Turner Motorsport	1	0	0	0	0	23	63rd
2017	Deutsche Tourenwagen Masters	BMW Team RBM	18	1	1	0	4	132	8th
2017	Blancpain GT Series Endurance Cup	Rowe Racing	4	0	0	0	0	6	27th
2017	24 Hours of Nürburgring - SP9	Rowe Racing	1	0	0	0	0	N/A	10th
2018	Blancpain GT Series Endurance Cup	R-Motorsport	5	0	1	0	0	13	32nd
2018	British GT Championship - GT3	Jetstream Motorsport AMR	9	1	0	0	2	77.5	7th
2018	24 Hours of Le Mans - LMGTE Pro	Aston Martin Racing	1	0	0	0	0	N/A	13th
2018	24 Hours of Nürburgring - SP9-LG	Aston Martin Racing	1	1	0	0	1	N/A	**1st**
2018–19	FIA World Endurance Championship - LMGTE Pro	Aston Martin Racing	8	1	0	0	1	66	8th
2019	Blancpain GT Series Endurance Cup	R-Motorsport	5	0	0	0	0	1	34th
2019	24 Hours of Le Mans - LMGTE Pro	Aston Martin Racing	1	0	0	0	0	N/A	12th
2019	ADAC GT Masters	PROpeak Performance	6	0	0	0	0	13	31st
2019–20	FIA World Endurance Championship - LMGTE Pro	Aston Martin Racing	8	1	0	0	5	160	**2nd**
2020	GT World Challenge Europe Endurance Cup	Garage 59	1	0	0	0	0	0	NC
2020	24 Hours of Le Mans - LMGTE Pro	Aston Martin Racing	1	0	0	0	1	N/A	**1st**
2020	24 Hours of Nürburgring - SP9	Frikadelli Racing Team	1	0	0	0	0	N/A	7th
2021	Asian Le Mans Series - GT	Garage 59	4	0	0	0	1	35	5th
2021	24 Hours of Le Mans - LMGTE Pro	HubAuto Racing	1	0	0	0	0	N/A	DNF
2021	GT World Challenge Europe Endurance Cup	KCMG	1	0	0	0	0	12	19th
2021	GT World Challenge Europe Endurance Cup	Oman Racing Team with TF Sport	1	0	0	0	0	12	19th
2021	24 Hours of Nürburgring - SP9	Frikadelli Racing Team	1	0	0	0	0	N/A	DNF
2022	IMSA SportsCar Championship - GTD Pro	Heart of Racing Team	2	0	0	0	0	436	22nd
2022	IMSA SportsCar Championship - GTD	Heart of Racing Team	9	2	0	0	4	2137	11th
2022	GT World Challenge Europe Endurance Cup	Beechdean AMR	3	0	0	1	0	6	30th
2022	24 Hours of Nürburgring - SP9	TF Sport	1	0	0	0	0	N/A	DNF
2023	IMSA SportsCar Championship - GTD	Paul Miller Racing	1	0	0	0	0	252	55th
2023	GT World Challenge Europe Endurance Cup	Team WRT	5	0	0	0	0	13	15th
2023	GT World Challenge Europe Sprint Cup	Team WRT	10	1	1	0	3	50	5th
2023	Intercontinental GT Challenge	Team WRT	4	0	0	0	1	39	12th
2023	24 Hours of Nürburgring - SP9	Rowe Racing	1	0	0	0	1	N/A	**2nd**
2023	24 Hours of Le Mans - LMP2 Pro-Am	DKR Engineering	1	0	0	0	1	N/A	**3rd**
2024	IMSA SportsCar Championship - GTP	BMW M Team RLL	3	0	0	0	0	810	20th
2024	FIA World Endurance Championship - LMGT3	Team WRT	8	0	0	0	2	61	6th
2024	24 Hours of Le Mans - LMGT3	Team WRT	1	0	0	0	0	N/A	DNF
2024	GT World Challenge Europe Endurance Cup	Team WRT	5	0	0	0	0	34	9th
2024	GT World Challenge Europe Sprint Cup	Team WRT	4	1	1	0	2	27	8th
2024	Intercontinental GT Challenge	Team WRT	2	0	0	0	0	24	10th
2024	Intercontinental GT Challenge	Rowe Racing	1	0	0	0	0	24	10th
2024	24 Hours of Nürburgring - SP9	Rowe Racing	1	0	0	0	0	N/A	7th
2025	FIA World Endurance Championship - LMGT3	Iron Lynx	8	0	0	0	1	39	13th
2025	IMSA SportsCar Championship - GTD Pro	GetSpeed	1	0	0	0	0	280	29th
2025	GT World Challenge Europe Endurance Cup	Boutsen VDS	5	0	0	0	0	1	27th
2025	GT World Challenge Europe Sprint Cup	Boutsen VDS	10	0	0	0	0	17.5	10th
2025	Intercontinental GT Challenge	Mercedes-AMG Team GMR	2	0	0	0	0	6	28th
2025	Intercontinental GT Challenge	Mercedes-AMG Team GetSpeed	1	0	0	0	0	6	28th
2025	Intercontinental GT Challenge	Boutsen VDS	1	0	0	0	0	6	28th
2025	Intercontinental GT Challenge	Mercedes-AMG Team Lone Star Racing	1	0	1	0	0	6	28th
2026	IMSA SportsCar Championship - GTD Pro	Winward Racing	1	0	0	0	1	322	33rd
2026	Nürburgring Langstrecken-Serie - SP9	Mercedes-AMG Team Ravenol							
2026	24 Hours of Nürburgring - SP9	Mercedes-AMG Team Ravenol	1	1	0	0	1	N/A	**1st**
2026	FIA World Endurance Championship - LMGT3	Iron Lynx	8	0	0	2	0	31	17th
2026	GT World Challenge Europe Endurance Cup	Mercedes-AMG Team GetSpeed	4	0	0	0	0	16	15th
2026	European Le Mans Series - LMGT3	Team Qatar by Iron Lynx	3	0	1	0	2	34	11th
2026	24H Series - GT3	GetSpeed Team PCX Racing	1	0	1	0	0	23	33rd
2026	GT World Challenge America - Pro	JMF Motorsports	1	0	0	0	0	0	NC†
2026	Intercontinental GT Challenge	Mercedes-AMG Team GMR	1	1	0	0	1	72	**1st**
2026	Intercontinental GT Challenge	Mercedes-AMG Team Ravenol	1	1	0	0	1	72	**1st**
2026	Intercontinental GT Challenge	Mercedes-AMG Team GetSpeed	1	0	0	0	0	72	**1st**
2026	Intercontinental GT Challenge	Mercedes-AMG Team Craft-Bamboo Racing	1	0	0	0	0	72	**1st**
2026	Intercontinental GT Challenge	JMF Motorsports	1	0	0	0	0	72	**1st**
2026–27	Asian Le Mans Series – GT3	Team Qatar by Iron Lynx						*	*

^{†} As Martin was a guest driver, he was ineligible for points.
^{*} Season still in progress.

=== Complete FIA GT1 World Championship results ===
Year	Team	Car	1	2	3	4	5	6	7	8	9	10	11	12	13	14	15	16	17	18	19	20	Pos.	Points
2010	Marc VDS Racing Team	Ford GT1	ABU; QR; 6	ABU; CR; 13	SIL; QR; 19	SIL; CR; 8	BRN; QR; 16	BRN; CR; Ret	PRI; QR; 20	PRI; CR; 4	SPA; QR; 9	SPA; CR; Ret	NÜR; QR; Ret	NÜR; CR; 11	ALG; QR; Ret	ALG; CR; 5	NAV; QR; 3	NAV; CR; 5	INT; QR; 11	INT; CR; 5	SAN; QR; 3	SAN; CR; Ret	14th	54
2011	Marc VDS Racing Team	Ford GT1	ABU; QR; 1	ABU; CR; 8	ZOL; QR; 5	ZOL; CR; 8	ALG; QR; 6	ALG; CR; Ret	SAC; QR; 1	SAC; CR; Ret	SIL; QR; NC	SIL; CR; Ret	NAV; QR; 3	NAV; CR; 4	PRI; QR; 5	PRI; CR; 6	ORD; QR; 1	ORD; CR; 1	BEI; QR; Ret	BEI; CR; 4	SAN; QR; 15	SAN; CR; 11	6th	98
2012	Valmon Racing Team Russia	Aston Martin DBRS9	NOG; QR; 16	NOG; CR; 12	ZOL; QR; 9	ZOL; CR; 12	NAV; QR; 14	NAV; QR; Ret	SVK; QR	SVK; CR	ALG; QR	ALG; CR	SVK; QR	SVK; CR	MOS; QR	MOS; CR	NUR; QR	NUR; CR	DON; QR	DON; CR			28th	0

=== Complete GT World Challenge Europe results ===
==== GT World Challenge Europe Endurance Cup ====
Year	Team	Car	Class	1	2	3	4	5	6	7	8	Pos.	Points
2011	Marc VDS Racing Team	Ford GT GT3	Pro	MNZ; 3	NAV; 13							5th	69
2011	Marc VDS Racing Team	BMW Z4 GT3	Pro			SPA; 6H; 52	SPA; 12H; Ret	**SPA**; **24H**; Ret	MAG; 1	SIL; 1		5th	69
2012	Marc VDS Racing Team	BMW Z4 GT3	Pro	MNZ; 1	SIL; 1	LEC; 2	SPA; 6H; 1	SPA; 12H; 3	SPA; 24H; 4	**NÜR**; Ret	NAV; 4	2nd	111
2013	Marc VDS Racing Team	BMW Z4 GT3	Pro	MNZ; 7	SIL; Ret	LEC; 1	SPA; 6H; 3	SPA; 12H; 2	SPA; 24H; Ret	NÜR; 2		3rd	71
2014	BMW Sports Trophy Team Marc VDS	BMW Z4 GT3	Pro	MNZ	SIL	LEC	SPA; 6H; 47	SPA; 12H; Ret	SPA; 24H; Ret	NÜR		NC	0
2015	BMW Sports Trophy Team Marc VDS	BMW Z4 GT3	Pro	MNZ	SIL	LEC; 3	SPA; 6H; 3	SPA; 12H; 3	SPA; 24H; 31	NÜR		9th	33
2016	Rowe Racing	BMW M6 GT3	Pro	MNZ	SIL; 4	LEC	SPA; 6H; 1	SPA; 12H; 4	SPA; 24H; 1	NÜR		5th	55
2017	Rowe Racing	BMW M6 GT3	Pro	MNZ	SIL; 7	LEC; Ret	SPA; 6H; 44	SPA; 12H; 27	SPA; 24H; 33	CAT; 12		27th	6
2018	R-Motorsport	Aston Martin V12 Vantage GT3	Pro	MNZ; 9	SIL; 5	LEC; 38	SPA; 6H; 17	SPA; 12H; 17	**SPA**; **24H**; 35	CAT; 19		33rd	13
2019	R-Motorsport	Aston Martin V12 Vantage GT3	Pro	MNZ; 37	SIL; 17	LEC; 10	SPA; 6H; 64	SPA; 12H; 64	SPA; 24H; Ret	CAT; 17		34th	1
2020	Garage 59	Aston Martin Vantage AMR GT3	Pro-Am	IMO	NÜR	SPA; 6H; 17	SPA; 12H; 24	SPA; 24H; 20	LEC			12th	34
2021	KCMG	Porsche 911 GT3 R	Pro	MNZ	LEC	SPA; 6H; 24	SPA; 12H; 8	SPA; 24H; 5				19th	12
2021	Oman Racing Team with TF Sport	Aston Martin Vantage AMR GT3	Pro-Am						NÜR; 26	CAT		27th	10
2022	Beechdean AMR	Aston Martin Vantage AMR GT3	Pro	IMO; 12	LEC; 13	SPA; 6H; 18	SPA; 12H; 5	SPA; 24H; 10	HOC	CAT		30th	6
2023	Team WRT	BMW M4 GT3	Pro	MNZ; Ret	LEC; 8	SPA; 6H; 13	SPA; 12H; 9	SPA; 24H; 6	NÜR; 49†	CAT; Ret		15th	13
2024	Team WRT	BMW M4 GT3	Pro	LEC; 4	SPA; 6H; 28	SPA; 12H; 10	SPA; 24H; 24	NÜR; 18	MNZ; 5	JED; 5		9th	34
2025	Boutsen VDS	Mercedes-AMG GT3 Evo	Pro	LEC; 28	MNZ; Ret	SPA; 6H; 39	SPA; 12H; 65†	SPA; 24H; Ret^{3}	NÜR; 13	CAT; Ret		27th	1
2026	Mercedes-AMG Team GetSpeed	Mercedes-AMG GT3 Evo	Pro	LEC; 7	MNZ; Ret	SPA; 6H; 62†	SPA; 12H; 62†	SPA; 24H; Ret	NÜR; 5	ALG		15th	16

==== GT World Challenge Europe Sprint Cup ====
Year	Team	Car	Class	1	2	3	4	5	6	7	8	9	10	11	12	13	14	Pos.	Points
2013	Marc VDS Racing Team	BMW Z4 GT3	Pro	NOG; QR	NOG; CR	ZOL; QR	ZOL; CR	ZAN; QR	ZAN; CR	SVK; QR	SVK; CR	NAV; QR	NAV; CR	BAK; QR; 5	BAK; CR; Ret			NC‡	0‡
2015	BMW Sports Trophy Team Brasil	BMW Z4 GT3	Pro	NOG; QR; 2	NOG; CR; 1	BRH; QR	BRH; CR	ZOL; QR	ZOL; CR	MOS; QR	MOS; CR	ALG; QR	ALG; CR	MIS; QR	MIS; CR	ZAN; QR	ZAN; CR	14th	31
2016	Boutsen Ginion	BMW M6 GT3	Pro-Am	MIS; QR; 25	MIS; CR; 25	BRH; QR	BRH; CR											6th	21
2016	Rowe Racing	BMW M6 GT3	Pro					NÜR; QR; 9	NÜR; CR; 8	HUN; QR	HUN; CR	CAT; QR	CAT; CR					26th	4
2023	Team WRT	BMW M4 GT3	Pro	BRH; 1; 14	BRH; 2; 2	MIS; 1; 8	MIS; 2; 1	HOC; 1; 8	HOC; 2; 7	VAL; 1; 8	VAL; 2 Ret	ZAN; 1; 3	**ZAN**; **2**; 7					5th	50
2024	Team WRT	BMW M4 GT3	Pro	BRH; 1; 15	BRH; 2; 25	**MIS**; **1**; 1	MIS; 2; 3	HOC; 1	HOC; 2	MAG; 1	MAG; 2	CAT; 1	CAT; 2					8th	27
2025	Boutsen VDS	Mercedes-AMG GT3 Evo	Pro	BRH; 1; 21	BRH; 2; 20	ZAN; 1; 8	ZAN; 2; 10	MIS; 1; 18	MIS; 2; 6	MAG; 1; 5	MAG; 2; 6	VAL; 1; 30	VAL; 2; 13					10th	17.5

^{‡} As Martin was a guest driver, he was ineligible for championship points.

=== Complete 24 Hours of Spa results ===
Year	Team	Co-Drivers	Car	Class	Laps	Pos.	Class Pos.
2006	(Belgium) First Motorsport	(Belgium) Dries Heyman (Belgium) Jean-Claude Meert (Belgium) Peter Van Delm	Porsche 911 GT3 Cup	G3	232	DNF	DNF
2008	(Belgium) Belgian Racing	(Belgium) Bas Leinders (Belgium) Renaud Kuppens	Gillet Vertigo Streiff	G2	145	DNF	DNF
2009	(Switzerland) Matech GT Racing	(Germany) Marc Hennerici (Germany) Thomas Mutsch (Switzerland) Peter Wyss	Ford GT GT3	G3	519	7th	1st
2010	(Belgium) Marc VDS Racing Team	(Belgium) Marc Duez (Belgium) Bas Leinders	Ford GT GT3	GT3	512	8th	2nd
2011	(Belgium) Marc VDS Racing Team	(Germany) Marc Hennerici (Belgium) Bas Leinders	BMW Z4 GT3	Pro Cup	102	DNF	DNF
2012	(Belgium) Marc VDS Racing Team	(Belgium) Bas Leinders (Finland) Markus Palttala	BMW Z4 GT3	Pro Cup	507	4th	4th
2013	(Belgium) Marc VDS Racing Team	(Netherlands) Yelmer Buurman (Belgium) Bas Leinders	BMW Z4 GT3	Pro Cup	300	DNF	DNF
2014	(Belgium) BMW Sports Trophy Team Marc VDS	(Brazil) Augusto Farfus (Germany) Jörg Müller	BMW Z4 GT3	Pro Cup	153	DNF	DNF
2015	(Belgium) BMW Sports Trophy Team Marc VDS	(Brazil) Augusto Farfus (Germany) Dirk Werner	BMW Z4 GT3	Pro Cup	399	31st	14th
2016	(Germany) ROWE Racing	(Austria) Philipp Eng (United Kingdom) Alexander Sims	BMW M6 GT3	Pro Cup	531	1st	1st
2017	(Germany) ROWE Racing	(Austria) Philipp Eng (United Kingdom) Alexander Sims	BMW M6 GT3	Pro Cup	498	33rd	20th
2018	(Switzerland) R-Motorsport	(Austria) Dominik Baumann (Germany) Marvin Kirchhöfer	Aston Martin V12 Vantage GT3	Pro Cup	485	35th	20th
2019	(Switzerland) R-Motorsport	(United Kingdom) Matt Parry (France) Matthieu Vaxivière	Aston Martin Vantage AMR GT3	Pro Cup	84	DNF	DNF
2020	(United Kingdom) Garage 59	(United Kingdom) Jonathan Adam (United Kingdom) Chris Goodwin (Sweden) Alexander West	Aston Martin Vantage AMR GT3	Pro-Am	519	20th	3rd
2021	(Hong Kong) KCMG	(United Kingdom) Nick Tandy (Belgium) Laurens Vanthoor	Porsche 911 GT3 R	Pro Cup	554	5th	5th
2022	(United Kingdom) Beechdean AMR	(Denmark) Marco Sørensen (Denmark) Nicki Thiim	Aston Martin Vantage AMR GT3	Pro Cup	534	10th	10th
2023	(Belgium) Team WRT	(Brazil) Augusto Farfus (Italy) Valentino Rossi	BMW M4 GT3	Pro Cup	537	6th	6th
2024	(Belgium) Team WRT	(Switzerland) Raffaele Marciello (Italy) Valentino Rossi	BMW M4 GT3	Pro Cup	475	24th	13th
2025	(Belgium) Boutsen VDS	(Germany) Maximilian Götz (Canada) Mikaël Grenier	Mercedes-AMG GT3 Evo	Pro Cup	127	DNF	DNF
2026	(Germany) Mercedes-AMG Team GetSpeed	(Germany) Maximilian Götz (Germany) Fabian Schiller	Mercedes-AMG GT3 Evo	Pro Cup	70	DNF	DNF

=== Complete 24 Hours of Nürburgring results ===
Year	Team	Co-Drivers	Car	Class	Laps	Pos.	Class Pos.
2012	(Belgium) Marc VDS Racing Team	(Belgium) Bas Leinders (Finland) Markus Palttala	BMW Z4 GT3	SP9 GT3	154	4th	4th
2013	(Belgium) Marc VDS Racing Team	(Netherlands) Yelmer Buurman (Italy) Andrea Piccini (Sweden) Richard Göransson	BMW Z4 GT3	SP9 GT3	88	**2nd**	**2nd**
2014	(Belgium) BMW Sports Trophy Team Marc VDS	(Germany) Uwe Alzen (Germany) Jörg Müller (Germany) Marco Wittmann	BMW Z4 GT3	SP9 GT3	60	DNF	DNF
2015	(Belgium) BMW Sports Trophy Team Marc VDS	(Germany) Lucas Luhr (Finland) Markus Palttala (United Kingdom) Richard Westbrook	BMW Z4 GT3	SP9 GT3	156	**2nd**	**2nd**
2016	(Germany) ROWE Racing	(Austria) Philipp Eng (United Kingdom) Alexander Sims (Germany) Dirk Werner	BMW M6 GT3	SP9	133	5th	5th
2017	(Germany) ROWE Racing	(Austria) Philipp Eng (Germany) Marc Basseng	BMW M6 GT3	SP9	157	10th	10th
2018	(United Kingdom) Aston Martin Racing	(Denmark) Marco Sørensen (Denmark) Nicki Thiim (United Kingdom) Darren Turner	Aston Martin V12 Vantage GT3	SP9-LG	134	4th	**1st**
2020	(Germany) Frikadelli Racing Team	(Germany) Lance David Arnold (France) Mathieu Jaminet (Germany) Lars Kern	Porsche 911 GT3 R	SP9	85	7th	7th
2021	(Germany) Frikadelli Racing Team	(France) Frédéric Makowiecki (Denmark) Dennis Olsen (France) Patrick Pilet	Porsche 911 GT3 R	SP9	54	DNF	DNF
2022	(United Kingdom) TF Sport AMR	(United Kingdom) David Pittard (Denmark) Marco Sørensen (Denmark) Nicki Thiim	Aston Martin Vantage AMR GT3	SP9 PRO	45	DNF	DNF
2023	(Germany) ROWE Racing	(South Africa) Sheldon van der Linde (Belgium) Dries Vanthoor (Germany) Marco Wittmann	BMW M4 GT3	SP9 PRO	162	**2nd**	**2nd**
2024	(Germany) ROWE Racing	(Brazil) Augusto Farfus (Switzerland) Raffaele Marciello (Germany) Marco Wittmann	BMW M4 GT3	SP9 PRO	50	7th	7th
2025	(Germany) Mercedes-AMG Team GetSpeed	(Germany) Maro Engel (Germany) Fabian Schiller (Germany) Luca Stolz	Mercedes-AMG GT3 Evo	SP9 PRO	41	DNF	DNF
2026	(United States) Mercedes-AMG Team Ravenol	(Germany) Maro Engel (Germany) Fabian Schiller (Germany) Luca Stolz	Mercedes-AMG GT3 Evo	SP9 Pro	156	1st	1st

=== Complete 24 Hours of Le Mans results ===
Year	Team	Co-Drivers	Car	Class	Laps	Pos.	Class Pos.
2011	(Belgium) Kronos Racing (Belgium) Marc VDS Racing Team	(Belgium) Vanina Ickx (Belgium) Bas Leinders	Lola-Aston Martin B09/60	LMP1	328	7th	7th
2012	(France) OAK Racing	(Denmark) David Heinemeier Hansson (Belgium) Bas Leinders	Morgan LMP2-Nissan	LMP2	341	14th	7th
2013	(France) Thiriet by TDS Racing	(France) Pierre Thiriet (France) Ludovic Badey	Oreca 03-Nissan	LMP2	310	DNF	DNF
2018	(United Kingdom) Aston Martin Racing	(United Kingdom) Alex Lynn (United Kingdom) Jonathan Adam	Aston Martin Vantage AMR	GTE; Pro	327	37th	13th
2019	(United Kingdom) Aston Martin Racing	(United Kingdom) Alex Lynn (United Kingdom) Jonathan Adam	Aston Martin Vantage AMR	GTE; Pro	325	44th	12th
2020	(United Kingdom) Aston Martin Racing	(United Kingdom) Alex Lynn (United Kingdom) Harry Tincknell	Aston Martin Vantage AMR	GTE; Pro	346	20th	**1st**
2021	(Chinese Taipei) Hub Auto Racing	(Portugal) Álvaro Parente (Belgium) Dries Vanthoor	Porsche 911 RSR-19	GTE; Pro	227	DNF	DNF
2023	(Luxembourg) DKR Engineering	(Belgium) Tom van Rompuy (Belgium) Ugo de Wilde	Oreca 07-Gibson	LMP2	311	32nd	15th
2023	(Luxembourg) DKR Engineering	(Belgium) Tom van Rompuy (Belgium) Ugo de Wilde	Oreca 07-Gibson	LMP2 Pro-Am	311	32nd	**3rd**
2024	(Belgium) Team WRT	(Oman) Ahmad Al Harthy (Italy) Valentino Rossi	BMW M4 GT3	LMGT3	109	DNF	DNF
2025	(Italy) Iron Lynx	(Australia) Martin Berry (Netherlands) Lin Hodenius	Mercedes-AMG GT3 Evo	LMGT3	337	44th	12th
2026	(Italy) Iron Lynx	(Angola) Rui Andrade (Australia) Martin Berry	Mercedes-AMG GT3 Evo	LMGT3	65	DNF	DNF

=== Complete Deutsche Tourenwagen Masters results ===
(key) (Races in bold indicate pole position) (Races in italics indicate fastest lap)

Year	Team	Car	1	2	3	4	5	6	7	8	9	10	11	12	13	14	15	16	17	18	Pos.	Points
2014	BMW Team RMG	BMW M4 DTM	HOC; 20	OSC; 14	HUN; 6	NOR; 17	**MSC**; 1	SPL; 15	NÜR; 7	LAU; 14	ZAN; 6	HOC; Ret									7th	47
2015	BMW Team RMG	BMW M4 DTM	HOC; 1; 7	HOC; 2; 14	LAU; 1; 7	LAU; 2; 8	NOR; 1 Ret	NOR; 2; 10	ZAN; 1; 3	ZAN; 2; 17	SPL; 1; 14	SPL; 2; 19	MSC; 1; 18	MSC; 2; 4	OSC; 1; 11	OSC; 2; 9	NÜR; 1; 1	NÜR; 2; 13	**HOC**; **1**; 3	HOC; 2; 6	7th	94
2016	BMW Team RBM	BMW M4 DTM	HOC; 1; 8	HOC; 2; 3	SPL; 1; 6	SPL; 2; 5	LAU; 1; 9	LAU; 2; 13	NOR; 1; 6	NOR; 2; 3	ZAN; 1; 10	ZAN; 2 Ret	MSC; 1; 6	MSC; 2; 17	NÜR; 1; 8	NÜR; 2; 10	HUN; 1; 13	HUN; 2; 7	HOC; 1; 13	HOC; 2; 6	8th	90
2017	BMW Team RBM	BMW M4 DTM	HOC; 1; 11	HOC; 2 Ret	LAU; 1; 4	LAU; 2; 8	HUN; 1 Ret	HUN; 2; 3	**NOR**; **1**; 2	NOR; 2; 1	MSC; 1; 16	MSC; 2 Ret	ZAN; 1; 3	ZAN; 2; 6	NÜR; 1; 17	NÜR; 2; 11	SPL; 1; 6	SPL; 2; 11	HOC; 1; 4	HOC; 2; 6	8th	132

=== Complete Bathurst 12 Hour results ===
Year	Team	Co-Drivers	Car	Class	Laps	Pos.	Class Pos.
2020	(United Kingdom) Garage 59	(United Kingdom) Chris Goodwin (France) Côme Ledogar (Sweden) Alexander West	Aston Martin Vantage AMR GT3	Pro-Am	37	DNF	DNF
2023	(Belgium) Team WRT	(Brazil) Augusto Farfus (Italy) Valentino Rossi	BMW M4 GT3	Pro	322	6th	6th
2024	(Belgium) Team WRT	(Switzerland) Raffaele Marciello (Italy) Valentino Rossi	BMW M4 GT3	Pro	275	5th	5th
2025	(Hong Kong) Mercedes-AMG Team GMR	(Germany) Maro Engel (Canada) Mikaël Grenier	Mercedes-AMG GT3 Evo	Pro	170	DNF	DNF
2026	(Hong Kong) Mercedes-AMG Team GMR	(Germany) Maro Engel (Canada) Mikaël Grenier	Mercedes-AMG GT3 Evo	Pro	262	**1st**	**1st**

=== Complete British GT Championship results ===
(key) (Races in bold indicate pole position) (Races in italics indicate fastest lap)

Year	Team	Car	Class	1	2	3	4	5	6	7	8	9	DC	Points
2018	Jetstream Motorsport AMR	Aston Martin V12 Vantage GT3	GT3	OUL; 1; 10	OUL; 2; 8	ROC; 1; 5	SNE; 1; 2	SNE; 2; 9	SIL; 1; 13	SPA; 1; 1	BRH; 1 Ret	DON; 1; 11	7th	77.5

=== Complete FIA World Endurance Championship results ===
(key) (Races in bold indicate pole position; races in italics indicate fastest lap)

Year	Entrant	Class	Chassis	Engine	1	2	3	4	5	6	7	8	Rank	Points
2018–19	Aston Martin Racing	LMGTE Pro	Aston Martin Vantage AMR	Aston Martin M177 4.0 L Turbo V8	SPA; 6	LMS; 13	SIL; 4	FUJ; 9	SHA; 4	SEB; 8	SPA; 1	LMS; 14	8th	66
2019–20	Aston Martin Racing	LMGTE Pro	Aston Martin Vantage AMR	Aston Martin M177 4.0 L Turbo V8	SIL; 3	FUJ; 3	SHA; 4	BHR; 3	COA; 4	SPA; 3	LMS; 1	BHR; 4	2nd	160
2024	Team WRT	LMGT3	BMW M4 GT3	BMW P58 3.0 L Turbo I6	QAT; 4	IMO; 2	SPA; Ret	LMS; Ret	SÃO; 5	COA; NC	FUJ; 3	BHR; 14	6th	61
2025	Iron Lynx	LMGT3	Mercedes-AMG GT3 Evo	Mercedes-AMG M159 6.2 L V8	QAT; Ret	IMO; 13	SPA; 11	LMS; 8	SÃO; Ret	COA; Ret	FUJ; 8	BHR; 2	13th	39
2026	Iron Lynx	LMGT3	Mercedes-AMG GT3 Evo	Mercedes-AMG M159 6.2 L V8	IMO; Ret	SPA; 10	LMS; Ret	SÃO; 6	COA; 6	FUJ; Ret	CAT; 6	MNZ; 7	17th	31

=== Complete 24 Hours of Daytona results ===
Year	Team	Co-drivers	Car	Class	Laps	Pos.	Class Pos.
2013	(United States) Turner Motorsport	(United States) Billy Johnson (Canada) Paul Dalla Lana (United States) Boris Said (United States) Bill Auberlen	BMW M3	GT	631	28th	18th
2013	(United States) Turner Motorsport	(United States) Bill Auberlen (United States) Michael Marsal (United Kingdom) Andy Priaulx (United States) Gunter Schaldach	BMW M3	GT	-	DNS	DNS
2014	(United States) BMW Team RLL	(United States) Joey Hand (United Kingdom) Andy Priaulx (United States) Bill Auberlen	BMW Z4 GTE	GTLM	679	7th	**2nd**
2016	(United States) Turner Motorsport	(United States) Michael Marsal (Finland) Markus Palttala (Finland) Jesse Krohn	BMW M6 GT3	GTD	701	19th	5th
2017	(United States) Turner Motorsport	(United States) Justin Marks (Germany) Jens Klingmann (Finland) Jesse Krohn	BMW M6 GT3	GTD	628	25th	8th
2022	(United States) Heart of Racing Team	(United Kingdom) Ross Gunn (Spain) Alex Riberas	Aston Martin Vantage AMR GT3	GTD Pro	103	DNF	DNF
2023	(United States) Paul Miller Racing	(United States) Corey Lewis (United States) Bryan Sellers (United States) Madison Snow	BMW M4 GT3	GTD	726	28th	8th
2024	(United States) BMW M Team RLL	(United States) Connor De Phillippi (Germany) René Rast (United Kingdom) Nick Yelloly	BMW M Hybrid V8	GTP	778	7th	7th
2025	(Germany) Getspeed	(United States) Anthony Bartone (Germany) Fabian Schiller (Germany) Luca Stolz	Mercedes-AMG GT3 Evo	GTD Pro	723	21st	5th
2026	(United States) Winward Racing	(United States) Jason Hart (United States) Scott Noble (Germany) Luca Stolz	Mercedes-AMG GT3 Evo	GTD Pro	662	21st	**3rd**

=== Complete IMSA SportsCar Championship results ===
(key) (Races in bold indicate pole position; results in italics indicate fastest lap)

	Team	Class	Make	Engine	1	2	3	4	5	6	7	8	9	10	11	12	Pos.	Points
2014	BMW Team RLL	GTLM	BMW Z4 GTE	BMW 4.4 L V8	DAY; 2	SEB	LBH	LGA	WGL	MOS	IND	ELK	VIR	COA	PET		28th	33
2016	Turner Motorsport	GTD	BMW M6 GT3	BMW 4.4 L V8	DAY; 5	SEB	LGA	DET	WGL	MOS	LIM	ELK	VIR	COA	PET		43rd	27
2017	Turner Motorsport	GTD	BMW M6 GT3	BMW 4.4 L V8	DAY; 8	SEB	LBH	COA	DET	WGL	MOS	LIM	ELK	VIR	LGA	PET	63rd	23
2022	Heart of Racing Team	GTD Pro	Aston Martin Vantage AMR GT3	Aston Martin 4.0 L Turbo V8	DAY; 13	SEB; 11											22nd	436
2022	Heart of Racing Team	GTD	Aston Martin Vantage AMR GT3	Aston Martin 4.0 L Turbo V8			LBH; 12	LGA; 7	MDO; 8	DET	WGL; 1	MOS; 1	LIM; 2	ELK; 6	VIR; 2	PET; 7	11th	2137
2023	Paul Miller Racing	GTD	BMW M4 GT3	BMW P58 3.0 L Twin-Turbo I6	DAY; 8	SEB	LBH	LGA	WGL	MOS	LIM	ELK	VIR	IMS	PET		55th	252
2024	BMW M Team RLL	GTP	BMW M Hybrid V8	BMW P66/3 4.0 L Turbo V8	DAY; 7	SEB; 4	LBH	LGA	DET	WGL	ELK	IMS	PET; 10				20th	810
2025	GetSpeed	GTD Pro	Mercedes-AMG GT3 Evo	Mercedes-AMG M159 6.2 L V8	DAY; 5	SEB	LGA	DET	WGL	MOS	ELK	VIR	IMS	PET			29th	280
2026	Winward Racing	GTD Pro	Mercedes-AMG GT3 Evo	Mercedes-AMG M159 6.2 L V8	DAY; 3	SEB	LGA	DET	WGL	MOS	ELK	VIR	IMS	PET			33rd	322

=== Complete European Le Mans Series results ===
(key) (Races in bold indicate pole position; races in italics indicate fastest lap)

Year	Entrant	Class	Chassis	Engine	1	2	3	4	5	6	Rank	Points
2026	Team Qatar by Iron Lynx	LMGT3	Mercedes-AMG GT3 Evo	Mercedes-AMG M159 6.2 L V8	CAT	**LEC**; Ret	IMO; 2	SPA; 3	SIL	ALG	11th	34

=== Complete 24 Hours of Zolder results ===
Year	Team	Co-Drivers	Car	Class	Laps	Pos.	Class Pos.
2009	(Belgium) VDS Racing Adventures	(Belgium) Eric De Doncker (Belgium) Stéphane Lémeret (Belgium) Raphaël Van Der Straten	Ford Mustang FR500 GT3	1	574	NC	NC
