= Jean-Michel Martin =

Belgian racing driver

Jean-Michel Antoine Maurice Martin (born 19 June 1953) is a Belgian racing driver. He won the 24 Hours of Spa four times, including twice with his younger brother Philippe in 1979 and 1980. His son Maxime also won the race in 2016. He was on the winning team of 1992 24 Hours Nürburgring.

== Racing record ==
=== Complete 24 Hours of Spa results ===
Year	Team	Co-Drivers	Car	Class	Laps	Pos.	Class Pos.
1974	(Belgium) Astree Shagrila RT	(Belgium) Roland de Jamblinne	Alfa Romeo 1600 GTV	Div.2	252	22nd	5th
1976	(Belgium) Opel Gosset Team	(Belgium) Tony Gillet (Belgium) Dany Wauters	Opel Commodore GS/E	Div.3	272	8th	2nd
1977	(United Kingdom) Gordon Spice Group	(Belgium) Roland de Jamblinne	Ford Capri II 3.0S	T +2,5		DNF	DNF
1978	(United Kingdom) Belca Castrol Team	(Belgium) René Tricot	Ford Capri III 3.0S	T +2,5		DNF	DNF
1979	(United Kingdom) Gordon Spice Racing	(Belgium) Philippe Martin	Ford Capri III 3.0S	T +2,5	444	1st	1st
1980	(United Kingdom) Belga Castrol Team	(Belgium) Philippe Martin	Ford Capri III 3.0S	T +2,5	425	1st	1st
1981	(United Kingdom) Belga Castrol Team	(Belgium) Philippe Martin	Ford Capri III 3.0S	T +2,5	416	13th	9th
1983	(Belgium) Ford Belga Team CC Racing	(Belgium) Philippe Martin (United Kingdom) Vince Woodman	Ford Mustang	Div.3		DNF	DNF
1984	(United Kingdom) IMC Toyota	(Belgium) Philippe Martin (United Kingdom) Gordon Spice	Toyota Celica Supra	Div.3	443	4th	4th
1985	BMW Belgium	(Belgium) Philippe Martin (United Kingdom) Gordon Spice	BMW 635 CSi	Div.3	53	DNF	DNF
1986	(Italy) CiBiEmme Sport	(Belgium) Eric van de Poele (Belgium) Pascal Witmeur	BMW 635 CSi	Div.3	489	DNF	DNF
1987	(Belgium) Waterloo Motors	(Belgium) Didier Theys (Belgium) Eric van de Poele	BMW M3	Div.2	481	1st	1st
1988	(Italy) Bigazzi M Team	(France) Olivier Grouillard (France) Jacques Lafitte	BMW M3 Evo	Div.2	504	3rd	2nd
1989	(Italy) Bastos Castrol Racing Team Bigazzi	(France) Olivier Grouillard (France) Jacques Lafitte	BMW M3 Evo	Div.2	158	DNF	DNF
1990	(Italy) Team Bigazzi	(Germany) Armin Hahne (United Kingdom) Steve Soper	BMW M3 Evo	DTM-Class 2	461	4th	3rd
1991	(Italy) CiBiEmme Sport	(France) Bernard Béguin (Belgium) Eddy Joosen	BMW M3 Evo	Div.2		DNF	DNF
1992	(Italy) BMW Fina Bastos Team Bigazzi	(Germany) Christian Danner (United Kingdom) Steve Soper	BMW M3 Evo	DTM2.5	513	1st	1st
1994	(Belgium) BMW Fina Bastos Team	(Germany) Altfrid Heger (Belgium) Patrick Slaus	BMW 318is	ST	507	3rd	3rd
1996	(Belgium) Castrol Juma Racing	(Belgium) Stéphane De Groodt (Belgium) Marc Goossens	BMW 325i	EcoTech		DQ	DQ
1998	(Belgium) Ecurie Toison d'Or	(Belgium) Thierry Boutsen (Belgium) Frédéric Moreau	BMW 320i	SP	458	12th	11th
1999	(Belgium) Ecurie Toison d'Or	(Netherlands) Patrick Huisman (Belgium) Nicolas Kropp	BMW 320i	SP	46	DNF	DNF
2000	(Germany) Duller Motorsport	(Belgium) Frédéric Moreau (Belgium) Thierry Tassin	BMW M3	N	478	2nd	1st
2001	(Netherlands) Team Carsport Holland	(Netherlands) Michael Bleekemolen (Netherlands) Sebastiaan Bleekemolen	Chrysler Viper GTS-R	GT	75	DNF	DNF
2002	(Belgium) PSI Motorsport	(Belgium) Frédéric Bouvy (Belgium) Nicolas Kropp	Porsche 996 GT3-R	GTN	83	DNF	DNF
2006	(Monaco) JMB Racing	(Switzerland) Iradj Alexander (France) Stéphane Daoudi (United Kingdom) Tim Sugden	Ferrari F430 GT2	GT2	133	DNF	DNF
2011	(Belgium) Marc VDS Racing Team	(Belgium) Éric Bachelart (Belgium) Marc Duez	Ford Mustang FR500 GT3	GT3 Pro-Am	444	26th	11th
2015	(Belgium) BMW Racing Against Cancer	(Belgium) Marc Duez (Belgium) Eric van de Poele (Belgium) Pascal Witmeur	BMW Z4 GT3	Pro-Am Cup	42	DNF	DNF

=== Complete 24 Hours of Le Mans results ===
Year	Team	Co-Drivers	Car	Class	Laps	Pos.	Class Pos.
1980	(France) Jean Rondeau	(Belgium) Philippe Martin (United Kingdom) Gordon Spice	Rondeau M379	GTP	330	3rd	1st
1981	(United Kingdom) Alain de Cadenet	(United Kingdom) Alain de Cadenet (Belgium) Philippe Martin	De Cadenet-Lola LM Ford-Cosworth	S +2.0	210	DNF	DNF
1982	(Germany) Belga Team Joest Racing	(Belgium) Philippe Martin (France) Bob Wollek	Porsche 936C	C	320	DNF	DNF
1983	(Germany) Belga Team Joest Racing	(Belgium) Marc Duez (Belgium) Philippe Martin	Porsche 936C	C	9	DNF	DNF
1984	(Japan) Mazdaspeed Co. Ltd.	(Republic of Ireland) David Kennedy (Belgium) Philippe Martin	Mazda 727C	C2	291	15th	4th
1985	(Japan) Mazdaspeed Co. Ltd.	(Republic of Ireland) David Kennedy (Belgium) Philippe Martin	Mazda 737C	C2	283	19th	3rd
1986	(United Kingdom) Spice Engineering	(United Kingdom) Ray Bellm (United Kingdom) Gordon Spice	Spice SE86C	C2	257	15th	6th

=== Complete 24 Hours of Nürburgring results ===
Year	Team	Co-Drivers	Car	Class	Laps	Pos.	Class Pos.
1979	(United Kingdom) Gordon Spice Racing	(Belgium) Philippe Martin (United Kingdom) Gordon Spice	Ford Capri III 3.0S	Gr.1 3.0	137	2nd	1st
1989	(Belgium) BMW Fina	(Belgium) Marc Duez (Belgium) Eric van de Poele	BMW M3	2	70	DNF	DNF
1990	(Germany) Linder M Team	(Germany) Norbert Haug (Germany) Ellen Lohr (Denmark) Kris Nissen	BMW M3	137	70	2nd	2nd
1992	(Germany) FINA Motorsport Team	(Venezuela) Johnny Cecotto (Germany) Christian Danner (Belgium) Marc Duez	BMW M3	12	76	1st	1st
1994	(Germany) Lautner Motorsport	(Italy) Gherardo Cazzago (Germany) Andreas Lautner	BMW 325i	8	80	DNF	DNF
