= Philippe Martin (racing driver) =

Belgian racing driver (born 1955)

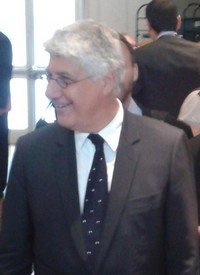
Philippe Martin

Philippe Martin (born 26 January 1955) is a Belgian former racing driver. He competed in the 24 Hours of Le Mans between 1980 and 1985. He won the 24 Hours of Spa twice alongside his brother Jean-Michel. His nephew Maxime also won the race in 2016.
