= Nathalie Maillet =

French architect and racecar driver (1970–2021)

- Nationality: Luxembourgish
- Born: 11 May 1970 Verdun, France
- Died: 15 August 2021 (aged 51) Gouvy, Belgium

NASCAR Whelen Euro Series career
- Debut season: 2012
- Former teams: Racing Club Partners, RCP / Marc VDS
- Starts: 22 (ENPRO), 10 (EN2)
- Championships: 0
- Wins: 0
- Poles: 0
- Fastest laps: 0
- Best finish: 12th in 2012, 2013, 2014
- Finished last season: 12th in 2014

Nathalie Maillet (11 May 1970 – 15 August 2021) was a French-Luxembourgish architect, promoter, and racing driver. She previously competed in the NASCAR Whelen Euro Series and was the former CEO of Circuit de Spa-Francorchamps for five years before her death in 2021.

== Biography ==
Maillet was born on 11 May 1970 in Verdun into a family immersed in automotive sport. Her father was a driver and her uncles directed a racing circuit. She married Franz Dubois, also a racecar driver.

Maillet earned a degree in architecture from the University of East London before starting a career in which she specialized in eco-architecture. In 2000, she founded Churchill-Hui International, based in Luxembourg.

In 2004, at the age of 33, Maillet became a racing driver. She participated in a number of events, such as the 25 Heures VW Fun Cup in 2006. Maillet competed in the NASCAR Whelen Euro Series championship for three seasons under a Luxembourgish racing license, driving for the Racing Club Partners team that she and Dubois owned. She competed in the top Elite 1 class (now known as EuroNASCAR PRO) for two seasons before she stepped down to the Elite 2 class (now EuroNASCAR 2) in 2014 following her team's merger with Marc VDS Racing Team. In the Elite 1 class, she scored a best finish of 8th on the first race at Spa-Francorchamps in 2012 while she scored a best finish of 6th in Elite 2, which she achieved twice in both Nürburgring and Circuit Bugatti. She scored a best championship finish of 12th, a feat she achieved in all three seasons that she competed. Maillet retired from racing at the conclusion of the 2014 season and she began to take up promoter duties. She played a role in organizing and promoting the American Festival Finals at Circuit Zolder, which was added to the NASCAR Whelen Euro Series calendar in 2015 and is still part of the Euro Series calendar as of the 2022 season.

In June 2016, Maillet became Director of the Circuit de Spa-Francorchamps in Belgium, succeeding Pierre-Alain Thibaut. She took office on 1 July of that year. Under Maillet's watch, Spa-Francorchamps began hosting the FIA World Rallycross Championship in 2019. Maillet also unveiled an €80 million dollar renovation project to the circuit that started its work in October 2020. The upgrade would see gravel traps being placed at La Source, Raidillon, Blanchimont, Les Combes and Stavelot and expansion of the runoff on corners such as Raidillon as part of Spa-Francorchamps' plan to host motorcycle races again. The upgrade will also include a grandstand at the top of the Eau Rouge/Raidillon hill and a new, shortened corner with more run-off space is added to the circuit at the Jacky Ickx corner that is due to be used for motorcycle racing purposes.

== Death ==
On 15 August 2021, Maillet was found shot dead at her home in Gouvy with her partner, Ann Lawrence Durviaux. The discovery came after she had missed a scheduled showing during that year's Ypres Rally. The investigation would reveal that Dubois committed the killings and then committed suicide after calling the police.

== Legacy ==
Tributes to Maillet were made within hours after her death was first reported. Circuit de Spa-Francorchamps described Maillet as "the face of the Circuit" and a woman that "embodied the passion for racing that we all share" in their official statement. Frédéric Lequien, CEO of Le Mans Endurance Management, stated that Maillet was "a woman full of energy, ideas and was a great pleasure to work with". NASCAR Whelen Euro Series described her as "a fierce competitor and a wonderful member of the EuroNASCAR family". Automobile Club de l'Ouest, Formula One Group, and websites such as Dailysportscar and Jalopnik also expressed their condolences in the days that followed after her death.

The upgrades to Circuit de Spa-Francorchamps that Maillet unveiled during her time as the CEO of the track was completed in March 2022, a few months before FIM Endurance World Championship's visit to the track on June. FIM Endurance World Championship would honor her by giving the Nathalie Maillet Challenge trophy to the fastest rider in Qualifying for the 24H Spa EWC Motos, in which Karel Hanika became the inaugural recipient of the trophy.

== Motorsports career results ==
=== NASCAR ===
(key) (Bold – Pole position. Italics – Fastest lap. * – Most laps led. ^ – Most positions gained)

==== Whelen Euro Series - Elite 1 ====
NASCAR Whelen Euro Series - Elite 1 results
Year	Team	No.	Make	1	2	3	4	5	6	7	8	9	10	11	12	NWES	Pts
2012	Racing Club Partners	46	Chevy	NOG; 13	NOG; 17	BRH; 19	BRH; 15	SPA; 8	SPA; 21	VAL; 11	VAL; 13	BUG; 14	BUG; 11			12th	445
2013	Racing Club Partners	46	Chevy	NOG; 16	NOG; 11											12th	475
2013	Racing Club Partners	46	Toyota			DIJ; 18	DIJ; 14	BRH; 18	BRH; 16	TOU; 11	TOU; 13	MNZ; 16	MNZ; 14	BUG; 17	BUG; 18	12th	475
2014	RCP / Marc VDS	46	Toyota	VAL	VAL	BRH	BRH	TOU	TOU	NÜR	NÜR	UMB; DNS	UMB; DNS	BUG; DNS	BUG; DNS	32nd	106

==== Whelen Euro Series - Elite 2 ====
NASCAR Whelen Euro Series - Elite 2 results
Year	Team	No.	Make	1	2	3	4	5	6	7	8	9	10	11	12	NWES	Pts
2014	RCP / Marc VDS	46	Toyota	VAL; 12	VAL; 16	BRH; 21	BRH; 12	TOU; 14	TOU; 17	NÜR; 6	NÜR; 19	UMB; DNS	UMB; DNS	BUG; 10	BUG; 6	12th	481
