= Ann Lawrence Durviaux =

Belgian jurist and academic (1968–2021)

- Born: 13 August 1968; Namur, Belgium
- Died: 15 August 2021 (aged 53); Gouvy, Belgium
- Occupations: Jurist; Professor

Ann Lawrence Durviaux (13 August 1968 – 15 August 2021) was a Belgian jurist and academic. She was a professor of political science and criminology at the University of Liège.

== Biography ==
Durviaux was born in Namur on 13 August 1968. She earned a law degree from the University of Liège and pursued a career as a lawyer, specializing in public and administrative law. She earned a doctorate degree in 1993 and was an assistant professor of administrative law and litigation at Liège until 2006. While at the school, she served as Vice-Dean for Teaching at the Faculty of Law. She also worked as a lawyer in Namur alongside Claire Doyen-Biver. In 2007, she became Director of the Laboratoire européen d'administration régionale et locale, a research and training laboratory for local communities.

On 15 August 2021, Durviaux was found shot dead with her mistress, Nathalie Maillet in Gouvy. Maillet's husband, Franz Dubois, was the suspected murderer, as he called the police before turning the gun on himself in an apparent suicide. Durviaux was buried in Ciney on 23 August.
