= Maxime Dumarey =

Belgian racing driver (born 1988)

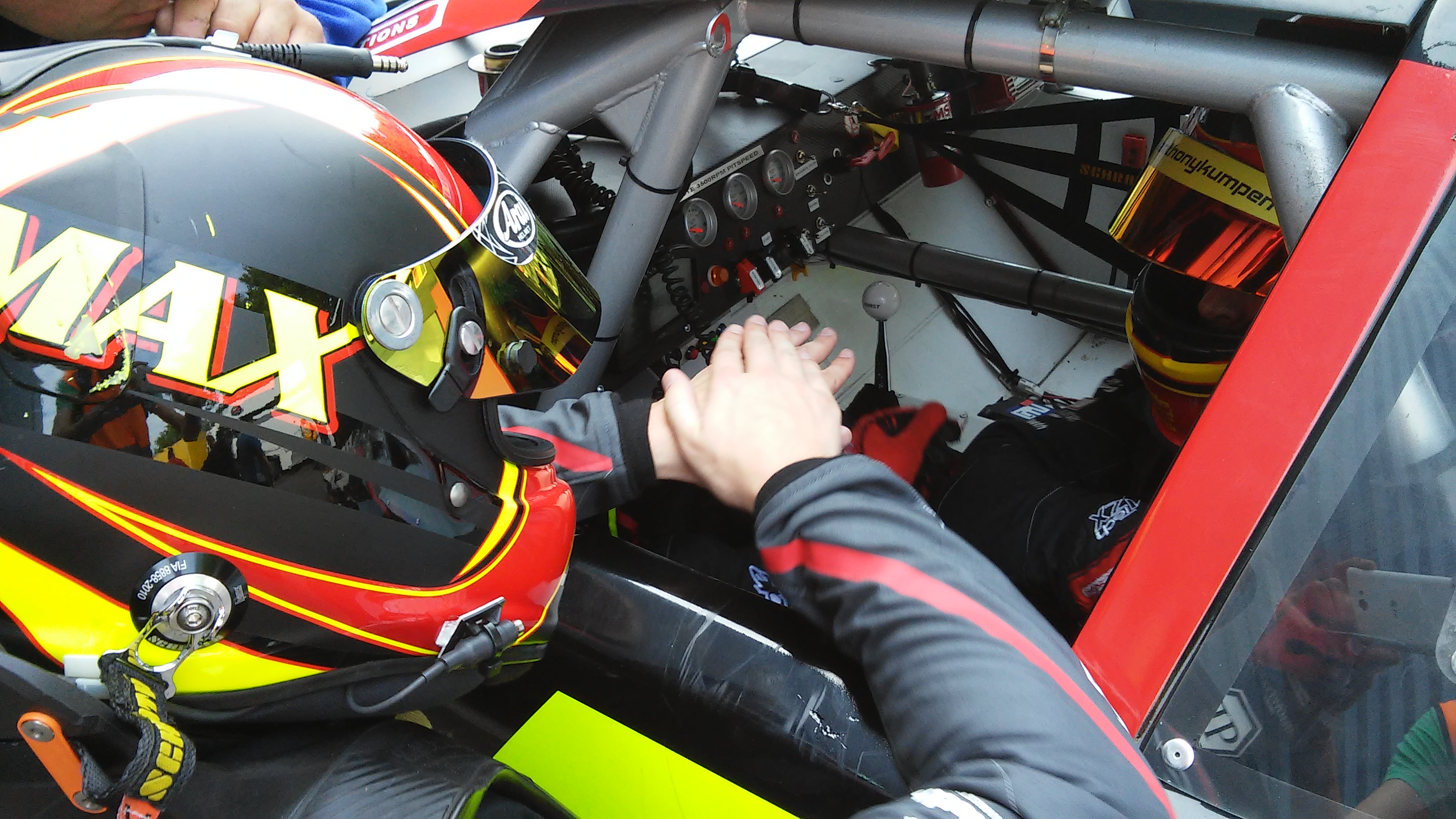
- Dumarey (left) with Anthony Kumpen in 2015
- Nationality: (Belgium) Belgian
- Born: 23 September 1988 (age 38) Ghent, Belgium
- Relatives: Guido Dumarey (father)
- Categorisation: FIA Silver (until 2022); FIA Bronze (2023–)

ARCA Menards Series career
- 4 races run over 2 years
- Best finish: 74th (2008)
- First race: 2007 ARCA Re/Max 200 (Talladega)
- Last race: 2008 ARCA Re/Max 200 (Talladega)
Wins	Top tens	Poles
0	1	0
- Statistics up to date as of July 9, 2023.

Maxime Dumarey (born 23 September 1988) is a Belgian professional auto racing driver who has competed in the ARCA Re/Max Series and the NASCAR Camping World East and West Series from 2007 to 2008. He is a former champion in the NASCAR Whelen Euro Series, having won the Elite 2 championship title in 2014. In 2023, he won the NLS (Nürburgring Langstrecken Serie) SP9 PRO-AM (GT3) championship with the Aston Martin Vantage GT3.

== Motorsports results ==
=== NASCAR ===
(key) (Bold – Pole position awarded by qualifying time. Italics – Pole position earned by points standings or practice time. * – Most laps led.)

==== Camping World East Series ====
NASCAR Camping World East Series results
Year	Team	No.	Make	1	2	3	4	5	6	7	8	9	10	11	12	13	NCWEC	Pts	Ref
2007	Fitz Motorsports	2	Dodge	GRE; 25	ELK	IOW											19th	1134	
2007	Fadden Racing	16	Chevy				SBO; 25	STA; 21	NHA; 27	TMP; 17	NSH; 14	ADI; 16	LRP; 21	MFD; 10	NHA; 36	DOV; 10	19th	1134	
2008	Mike Olsen Racing	16	Chevy	GRE; 12		SBO; 28		NHA; 16	TMP; 11	NSH; 10	ADI; 12	LRP; 8	MFD; 23	NHA; 12	DOV; 25	STA	17th	1395	
2008	Mike Olsen Racing	76	Chevy		IOW; DNQ												17th	1395	
2008	Mike Olsen Racing	16	Dodge				GLN; 21										17th	1395	

==== Camping World West Series ====
NASCAR Camping World West Series results
Year	Team	No.	Make	1	2	3	4	5	6	7	8	9	10	11	12	13	NCWWSC	Pts	Ref
2008	Mike Olsen Racing	76	Chevy	AAS	PHO; 27	CTS	IOW; DNQ	CNS									54th	137	
2008	Mike Olsen Racing	76	Dodge						SON; 36	IRW	DCS	EVG	MMP	IRW	AMP	AAS	54th	137	

==== Whelen Euro Series – Elite 2 ====
NASCAR Whelen Euro Series – Elite 2 results
Year	Team	No.	Make	1	2	3	4	5	6	7	8	9	10	11	12	NWES	Pts	Ref
2014	PK Carsport	24	Chevy	VAL; 6	VAL; 4	BRH; 5	BRH; 3	**TOU**; 3	TOU; 6	NÜR; 3	NÜR; 3	**UMB**; 1**	**UMB**; 14	BUG; 3	BUG; 5	1st		
2015	PK Carsport	24	Chevy	VAL	VAL	VEN; 9	VEN; 8	BRH; 11	BRH; 6	TOU; DNS	TOU; DNS	UMB	UMB	ZOL; 5	ZOL; 19	18th	319	

=== ARCA Re/Max Series ===
(key) (Bold – Pole position awarded by qualifying time. Italics – Pole position earned by points standings or practice time. * – Most laps led.)

ARCA Re/Max Series results
Year	Team	No.	Make	1	2	3	4	5	6	7	8	9	10	11	12	13	14	15	16	17	18	19	20	21	22	23	ARMC	Pts	Ref
2007	Fadden Racing	94	Ford	DAY	USA	NSH	SLM	KAN	WIN	KEN	TOL	IOW	POC	MCH	BLN	KEN	POC	NSH	ISF	MIL	GTW	DSF	CHI	SLM	TAL; 10	TOL	118th	180	
2008	Fadden Racing	94	Ford	DAY; 37	SLM	IOW	KAN; 27	CAR	KEN	TOL	POC	MCH	CAY	KEN	BLN	POC	NSH	ISF	DSF	CHI	SLM	NJE	TAL; 11	TOL			74th	315	

Sporting positions
Preceded by Anthony Gandon	NASCAR Whelen Euro Series Elite 2 Champion; 2014	Succeeded by Gianmarco Ercoli
