= Anthony Kumpen =

Belgian racing driver

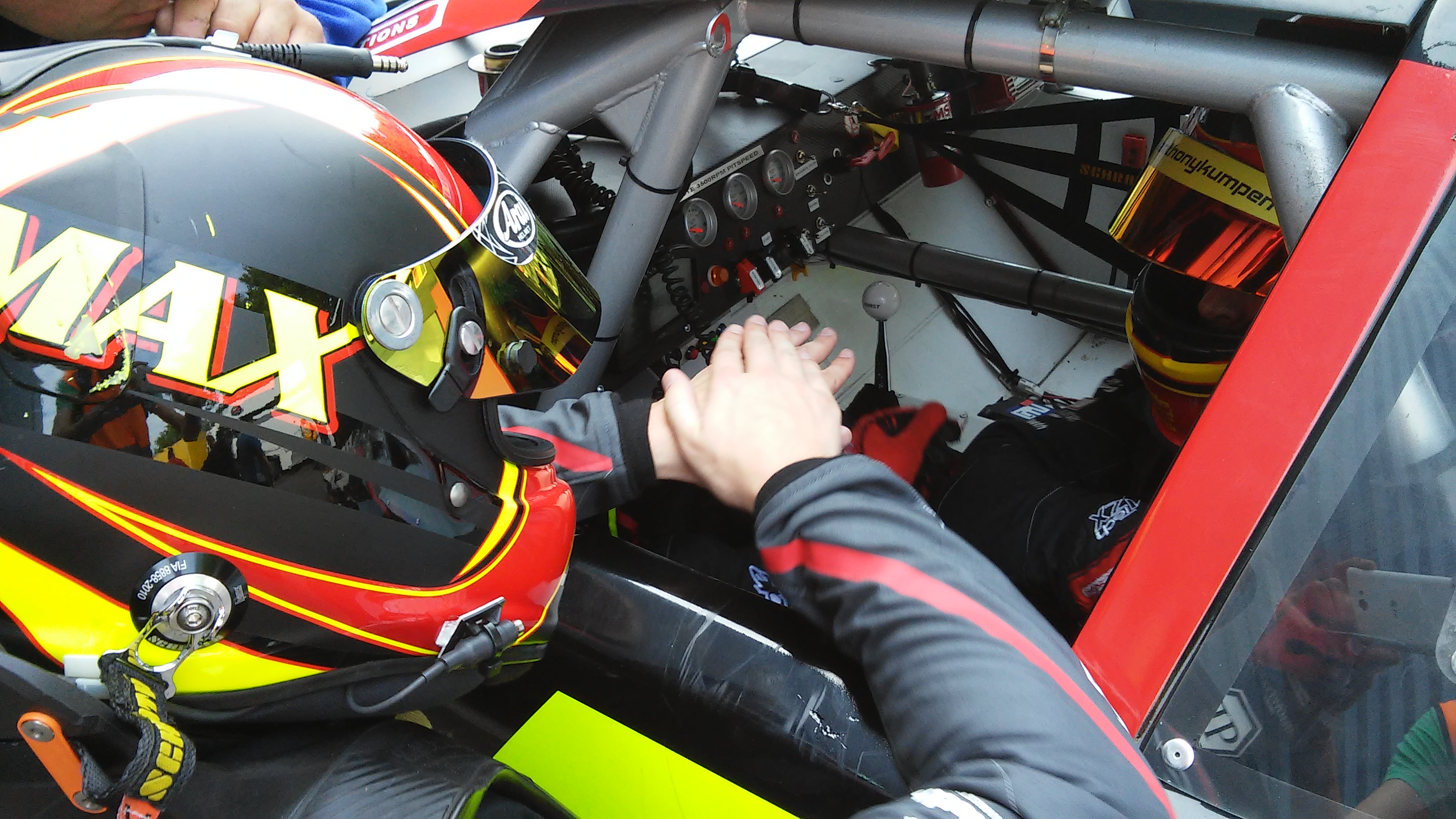
- Kumpen (right) with teammate Maxime Dumarey in 2015
- Nationality: Belgian
- Born: Anthony Christian Claus Kumpen; 3 November 1978 (age 48) Hasselt, Belgium
- Relatives: Paul Kumpen (father); Robert Kumpen (uncle); Sophie Kumpen (first cousin); Max Verstappen (first cousin once removed)

NASCAR Whelen Euro Series career
- Debut season: 2014
- Categorisation: FIA Platinum (until 2013); FIA Gold (2014–)
- Teams: PK Carsport
- Car number: 66
- Starts: 57
- Championships: 2 (2014, 2016)
- Wins: 10
- Podiums: 27
- Poles: 6
- Fastest laps: 7
- Best finish: 1st in 2014, 2016
- Finished last season: 27th in 2024

Previous series
- 2015–2017 2015 2011–2013 2010 2001–2003 2001 1999–2009: NASCAR Xfinity Series; NASCAR K&N Pro Series East; Blancpain Endurance Series; FIA GT1 World Championship; American Le Mans; Rolex Sports Car Series; FIA GT Championship

Championship titles
- 2014, 2016: EuroNASCAR PRO

NASCAR O'Reilly Auto Parts Series career
- 6 races run over 3 years
- 2017 position: 51st
- Best finish: 51st (2017)
- First race: 2015 U.S. Cellular 250 (Iowa)
- Last race: 2017 Mid-Ohio Challenge (Mid-Ohio)
Wins	Top tens	Poles
0	0	0

24 Hours of Le Mans career
- Years: 2001–2004
- Teams: Paul Belmondo Racing, Team Carsport Holland / Racing Box, Carsport America, Taurus Sports Racing
- Best finish: 40th (2001)
- Class wins: 0

Anthony Christian Claus Kumpen (born 3 November 1978) is a Belgian professional racing driver and team manager. Kumpen currently works as team manager for PK Carsport in the NASCAR Euro Series. He previously competed full-time in the series, winning the championship twice, in 2014 and 2016. He also joint-held the record of the most 24 Hours of Zolder wins with six.

== Racing career ==
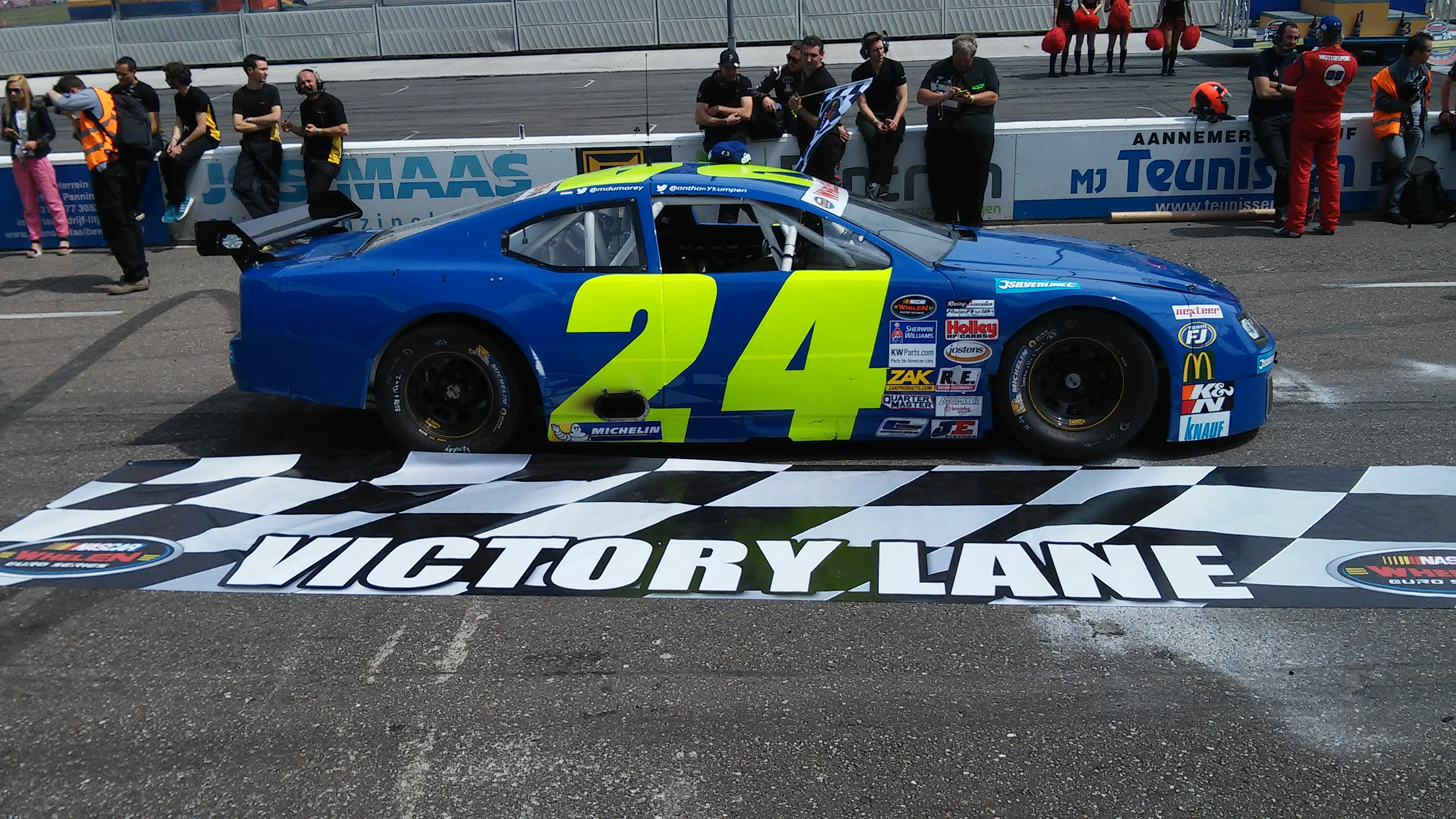
Kumpen's car after his win in Elite 1 race two at Raceway Venray 2015.

In 1988, Kumpen started kart racing. He moved on to Belcar, the Belgian Racing Car Championship, in 1998, winning the GT2 championship in his first year, and the GT championship in 1999. He won several more Belgian GT and GTA championships over the next decade. In 2000, he won the overall classification at the 24 Hours of Zolder, a feat he would repeat in 2002, 2003, 2004, 2010 and 2012 for a record total of six victories.

In 2000, Kumpen started competing in the FIA GT Championship for the Paul Belmondo Racing team. His first victory in a race in this championship followed in 2002. More victories followed in 2005 (2), 2006, 2008 and 2009 (2).

Kumpen also competed in the 24 Hours of Daytona and the 24 Hours of Le Mans.

In 2014, Kumpen competed in the NASCAR Whelen Euro Series for the PK Carsport team, driving a Holden VF Commodore. He won one race in the championship, and ended the season in first place, one point ahead of defending champion Ander Vilariño.

Kumpen's win gave him a license to compete in the 2015 NASCAR K&N Pro Series East, racing for Bill McAnally. On 7 June, as part of the Nexteer Automotive Road To Daytona program, he announced his intentions to compete in the Xfinity Series, running three races at Iowa Speedway, Phoenix International Raceway and Homestead-Miami Speedway. In 2016, he announced that he would run the Xfinity Series season opener at Daytona for Precision Performance Motorsports, driving the No. 46 Chevy. He continued his part-time slate in the Xfinity Series in 2017, adding two races at Daytona and Mid-Ohio Sports Car Course, driving the No. 46 Chevy for PPM. Kumpen was also in discussions with Rick Ware Racing to make his Monster Energy NASCAR Cup Series debut with the team in 2018, but it never materialised because of his doping suspension (NASCAR is a member of ACCUS, which honours FIA doping suspensions such as the one imposed by the Royal Automobile Club of Belgium).

Kumpen was suspended for four years by the Royal Automobile Club of Belgium after he failed a drug test during the 2018 24 Hours of Zolder. He had neglected to apply for a therapeutic use exemption concerning ADHD medication. During his suspension, he moved to a management role in PK Carsport and is currently working as the team manager for the Euro Series operations of the team.

Kumpen returned to racing in late 2022, and embarked on a full-time season in the NASCAR Whelen Euro Series for the 2023 season always with their PK Carsport team.

== Personal life ==
Kumpen is the son of Paul Kumpen, a former race pilot, Belgian Rallycross Champion 1987 with Porsche 911 BiTurbo 4x4, director of the building company Kumpen, president of VOKA Limburg, and founder of PK Carsport. Paul Kumpen owned 50% of the shares of Ridley Bikes, and Anthony worked as a commercial director for the company, which became the largest bike manufacturer in Belgium. Anthony stayed on at the company after his father sold his share in 2013.

Kumpen lives in Hasselt and is married to Griet Vanhees. They have a son. Kumpen has a daughter and a stepson, from his and his wife's previous relationships. He is the first cousin of Sophie Kumpen, the mother of four-time F1 World Champion Max Verstappen.

In 2010, Kumpen participated in Sterren op de Dansvloer (the Belgian version of Dancing with the Stars) on vtm. He was voted out of the show in the third episode and finished as 8th out of 10 contestants.

== Motorsports career results ==
=== NASCAR ===
(key) (Bold – Pole position awarded by qualifying time. Italics – Pole position earned by points standings or practice time. * – Most laps led.)

==== Whelen Euro Series – Elite 1 ====
NASCAR Whelen Euro Series – Elite 1 results
Year	Team	No.	Make	1	2	3	4	5	6	7	8	9	10	11	12	13	NWES	Pts	Ref
2014	PK Carsport	24	Chevy	VAL; 3	VAL; 4	BRH; 4	BRH; 2	TOU; 7	TOU; 8	NÜR; 5	NÜR; 3	UMB; 2	UMB; 5	BUG; 1	BUG; 2		1st	656	
2015	PK Carsport	24	Chevy	VAL; 5	VAL; 3	VEN; 16	VEN; 1*	BRH; 5	BRH; 5	TOU; 18	TOU; 9	UMB; 4	UMB; 10	ZOL; 3	ZOL; 3		4th	610	
2016	PK Carsport	24	Chevy	**VAL**; 1*	VAL; 4	VEN; 2	VEN; 1**	**BRH**; 1**	BRH; 10	TOU; 4	TOU; 5	ADR; 1*	ADR; 2	ZOL; 1**	ZOL; 7		1st	657	
2017	PK Carsport	24	Chevy	VAL; 23	VAL; 4	**BRH**; 1**	BRH; 7	**VEN**; 1**	VEN; 2	HOC; 2	HOC; 1*	FRA; 6	FRA; 16	ZOL; 3	ZOL; 3		2nd	609	
2018	PK Carsport	24	Chevy	VAL; 3	VAL; 2	FRA; 4	FRA; 5	BRH; 4	BRH; 23	TOU; 18	TOU; 18	HOC	HOC	ZOL	ZOL		23rd	200	
2022	PK Carsport	24	Chevy	ESP	ESP	GBR	GBR	ITA	ITA	CZE	CZE	BEL; 26	BEL; 2	CRO	CRO		37th	46	
2023	PK Carsport	24	Chevy	ESP; 7	ESP; 4	GBR; 4	GBR; 2	ITA; 12	ITA; 6	CZE; 2	CZE; 12	GER; 6	GER; 3	BEL; 5	BEL; 6		4th	388	
2024	PK Carsport	66	Chevy	ESP	ESP	ITA	ITA	GBR	GBR	NED	CZE	CZE	GER	GER	BEL; 19	BEL; 11	27th	88	

==== Xfinity Series ====
NASCAR Xfinity Series results
Year	Team	No.	Make	1	2	3	4	5	6	7	8	9	10	11	12	13	14	15	16	17	18	19	20	21	22	23	24	25	26	27	28	29	30	31	32	33	NXSC	Pts	Ref
2015	Rick Ware Racing	15	Chevy	DAY	ATL	LVS	PHO	CAL	TEX	BRI	RCH	TAL	IOW	CLT	DOV	MCH	CHI	DAY	KEN	NHA	IND	IOW; 28	GLN	MOH	BRI	ROA	DAR	RCH	CHI	KEN	DOV	CLT	KAN	TEX			52nd	53	
2015	Precision Performance Motorsports	55	Chevy																																PHO; 24	HOM; 27	52nd	53	
2016	Precision Performance Motorsports	46	Chevy	DAY; 26	ATL	LVS	PHO	CAL	TEX	BRI	RCH	TAL	DOV	CLT	POC	MCH	IOW	DAY	KEN	NHA	IND	IOW	GLN	MOH	BRI	ROA	DAR	RCH	CHI	KEN	DOV	CLT	KAN	TEX	PHO	HOM	70th	15	
2017	Precision Performance Motorsports	46	Chevy	DAY; 22	ATL	LVS	PHO	CAL	TEX	BRI	RCH	TAL	CLT	DOV	POC	MCH	IOW	DAY	KEN	NHA	IND	IOW	GLN	MOH; 16	BRI	ROA	DAR	RCH	CHI	KEN	DOV	CLT	KAN	TEX	PHO	HOM	51st	36	

==== K&N Pro Series East ====
NASCAR K&N Pro Series East results
Year	Team	No.	Make	1	2	3	4	5	6	7	8	9	10	11	12	13	14	NKNPSEC	Pts	Ref
2015	Bill McAnally Racing	99	Toyota	NSM; 14	GRE	BRI	IOW	BGS	LGY	COL								40th	53	
2015	Marsh Racing	36	Chevy								NHA; 21	IOW	GLN	MOT	VIR	RCH	DOV	40th	53	

^{*} Season still in progress
^{1} Ineligible for series points

=== Complete 24 Hours of Le Mans results ===
Year	Team	Co-Drivers	Car	Class	Laps	Pos.	Class Pos.
2001	(France) Paul Belmondo Racing	(France) Grégoire de Galzain (France) Jean-Claude Lagniez	Chrysler Viper GTS-R	GTS	44	DNF	DNF
2002	(Netherlands) Team Carsport Holland (Italy) Racing Box	(Netherlands) Mike Hezemans (Italy) Gabriele Matteuzzi	Chrysler Viper GTS-R	GTS	93	DNF	DNF
2003	(United States) Carsport America	(Netherlands) Mike Hezemans (Netherlands) David Hart	Pagani Zonda GR	GTS	10	DNF	DNF
2004	(United Kingdom) Taurus Sports Racing	(United Kingdom) Phil Andrews (United Kingdom) Calum Lockie	Lola B2K/10	LMP1	35	DNF	DNF

=== Complete 24 Hours of Spa results ===
Year	Team	Co-Drivers	Car	Class	Laps	Pos.	Class Pos.
2000	(Austria) Düller Motorsport	(Belgium) Carlo Geeraedts (Belgium) Jérôme Thiry	BMW M3	N		DNF	DNF
2001	(France) Paul Belmondo Compétition	(France) Paul Belmondo (France) Claude-Yves Gosselin	Chrysler Viper GTS-R	GT	501	8th	5th
2002	(Netherlands) Team Carsport Holland	(Netherlands) Mike Hezemans (Belgium) Thierry Tassin	Chrysler Viper GTS-R	GT	204	DNF	DNF
2003	(Switzerland) Force One Racing	(France) Philippe Alliot (Netherlands) David Hart (Netherlands) Mike Hezemans	Chrysler Viper GTS-R	GT	12	DNF	DNF
2004	(Belgium) Renstal Excelsior	(France) Eric Cayrolle (Belgium) Marc Goossens (France) Yvan Lebon	Chevrolet Corvette C5-R	G2	295	DNF	DNF
2005	(Belgium) GLPK Carsport	(Netherlands) Jeroen Bleekemolen (Netherlands) Mike Hezemans (Belgium) Bert Longin	Chevrolet Corvette C5-R	GT1	563	DSQ	DSQ
2006	(Belgium) GLPK Carsport	(Netherlands) Mike Hezemans (Belgium) Bert Longin (Belgium) Kurt Mollekens	Chevrolet Corvette C6-R	GT1	580	3rd	3rd
2007	(Belgium) GLPK Carsport	(Belgium) Frédéric Bouvy (Belgium) Bert Longin (Belgium) Kurt Mollekens	Chevrolet Corvette C5-R	GT1	529	3rd	3rd
2008	(Belgium) Peka Racing	(Belgium) Frédéric Bouvy (Belgium) Bert Longin (Belgium) Kurt Mollekens	Saleen S7-R	GT1	255	DNF	DNF
2009	(Belgium) PK Carsport	(Netherlands) Mike Hezemans (Netherlands) Jos Menten (Belgium) Kurt Mollekens	Chevrolet Corvette C6.R	GT1	559	1st	1st
2010	(Germany) Phoenix Racing	(Switzerland) Marcel Fässler (Germany) Lucas Luhr (Germany) Mike Rockenfeller	Audi R8 LMS	GT3	294	DNF	DNF
2011	(Netherlands) KRK Racing Team Holland	(Netherlands) Mike Hezemans (Belgium) Koen Wauters	Mercedes-Benz SLS AMG GT3	GT3 Pro	151	DNF	DNF
2012	(Belgium) KRK Racing	(Netherlands) Dennis Retera (Belgium) Raf Vanthoor (Belgium) Koen Wauters	Mercedes-Benz SLS AMG GT3	GT3 Pro-Am	190	DNF	DNF
2013	(Germany) Phoenix Racing	(Belgium) Enzo Ide (Germany) Markus Winkelhock	Audi R8 LMS	Pro Cup	453	30th	12th

=== Complete 24 Hours of Zolder results ===
Year	Team	Co-Drivers	Car	Class	Laps	Pos.	Class Pos.
1998	(Belgium) AD Sport	(Belgium) Erik Bruynoghe (Belgium) Bert Longin	Porsche 911	GT2	590	19th	4th
1999	(Belgium) GLPK Racing	(France) Stéphane Cohen (Belgium) Marc Duez	Porsche 993 GT2	GT1	658	11th	4th
2000	(Belgium) GLPK Racing	(France) Stéphane Cohen (Belgium) Marc Duez	Chrysler Viper GTS-R	GT	756	1st	1st
2001	(Belgium) GLPK Racing	(Belgium) Eric Geboers (Belgium) Bert Longin	Chrysler Viper GTS-R	GTA	49	DNF	DNF
2002	(Belgium) GLPK Racing	(Belgium) Vincent Dupont (Netherlands) Mike Hezemans (Belgium) Bert Longin	Chrysler Viper GTS-R	GTA	775	1st	1st
2003	(Belgium) GLPK Racing	(Belgium) Vincent Dupont (Netherlands) Mike Hezemans (Belgium) Bert Longin	Chrysler Viper GTS-R	GTA	778	1st	1st
2004	(Belgium) GLPK Racing	(Netherlands) Mike Hezemans (Portugal) Pedro Lamy (Belgium) Bert Longin	Chrysler Viper GTS-R	GTA	777	1st	1st
2005	(Belgium) GLPK Racing	(Belgium) Marc Duez (Netherlands) Val Hillebrand (Belgium) Bert Longin	Chrysler Viper GTS-R	GTA	134	DNF	DNF
2006	(Belgium) GLPK Carsport	(Netherlands) Mike Hezemans (Belgium) Bert Longin (Belgium) Kurt Mollekens	Chevrolet Corvette C5-R	Belcar 1	815	3rd	3rd
2007	(Belgium) PK Carsport	(Netherlands) David Hart (Belgium) Bert Longin (Belgium) Kurt Mollekens	Chevrolet Corvette C6 Z06.R GT3	Belcar 1		DNF	DNF
2008	(Belgium) Gravity Racing International	(Belgium) Bert Longin (Belgium) Vincent Radermecker	Mosler MT900R	Belcar 1		DNF	DNF
2009	(Belgium) Delahaye Racing Team	(Belgium) Marc Goossens (Belgium) Ludovic Sougnez (Belgium) Maxime Soulet	Renault Mégane Trophy	4A		DNF	DNF
2010	(Belgium) First Motorsport	(Belgium) Frank Beliën (Belgium) Henk Haane (Belgium) Bert Longin	Porsche 997 GT3 Cup S	GTB	801	1st	1st
2011	(Belgium) KRK Racing	(Netherlands) Dennis Retera (Belgium) Raf Vanthoor (Belgium) Koen Wauters	Mercedes SLS AMG GT3	GT3	709	3rd	2nd
2012	(Belgium) Team WRT	(Italy) Marco Bonanomi (Sweden) Edward Sandström (Belgium) Laurens Vanthoor	Audi R8 LMS	GT	860	1st	1st
2013	(Belgium) Team WRT	(Belgium) Enzo Ide (Belgium) Bert Longin (Belgium) Laurens Vanthoor	Audi R8 LMS	GT	765	4th	3rd
2014	(Italy) Avelon Formula	(Belgium) Frank Beliën (Italy) Ivan Bellarosa (Belgium) Bert Longin	Wolf GB08	P2	740	2nd	1st
2015	(Netherlands) Bas Koeten Racing	(Belgium) Frank Beliën (Belgium) Bert Longin (Belgium) Louis Machiels	Wolf GB08	P1	109	DNF	DNF
2016	(Belgium) PK Carsport	(Belgium) Frank Beliën (Belgium) Kris Cools (Belgium) Bert Longin	Wolf GB08	Belcar 2	458	44th	4th
2017	(Belgium) PK Carsport	(Belgium) Frank Beliën (Belgium) Bert Longin (Belgium) Stienes Longin	Porsche 991 GT3 Cup	Belcar 7	519	33rd	4th
2018	(Belgium) Heinz POWERKIT.shop by Wolf Racing	(Italy) Ivan Bellarosa (Italy) Guglielmo Belotti (Belgium) Tom Boonen (Belgium) Bert Longin	Wolf GB08 Tornado	Belcar 2	780	4th	2nd
2018	(Belgium) PK Carsport	(Belgium) Christophe Beliën (Belgium) Frank Beliën (Belgium) Pedro Bonnet (Belgium) Tom Boonen (Belgium) Bert Longin	Porsche 991 GT3 Cup	Belcar 1	676	20th	6th

Sporting positions
Preceded by Ander Vilariño	NASCAR Whelen Euro Series Champion; 2014	Succeeded by Ander Vilariño
Preceded by Ander Vilariño	NASCAR Whelen Euro Series Champion; 2016	Succeeded by Alon Day
