= 2014 NASCAR Whelen Euro Series =

Seasons
- ← 2013 2015 →

Locations of the European racing circuits

The 2014 NASCAR Whelen Euro Series was the sixth Racecar Euro Series season, and the second under the NASCAR Whelen Euro Series branding. The season consisted of six meetings – with two races at each meeting – starting on 12 April at Circuit Ricardo Tormo in Valencia, and ending on 12 October at the Bugatti Circuit in Le Mans.

The Elite division title went down to the final race of the season, and was ultimately decided in favour of PK Carsport driver Anthony Kumpen, by just a single point. Kumpen only won one race during the season, coming at the final race weekend, but with top-ten finishes in each of the season's races, it allowed him to just fend off the defending champion Ander Vilariño of TFT Racing. Vilariño won the most races during the season with four and took the most podium finishes with nine, but lost the title due to the series' double points system that was in effect for the final two events of the season. Third place in the championship went to CAAL Racing's Eddie Cheever III, who took three wins during the season. A total of seven drivers won races in the division during the season, which set a new series record. Aside from the top trio in the championship, Yann Zimmer won at Valencia, Borja García and Frédéric Gabillon both won at the Nürburgring, while Mathias Lauda won a race at Tours Speedway, the series' first race to be held in wet conditions at an oval.

In the Elite 2 class, the championship battle was won by another PK Carsport driver as Maxime Dumarey sealed the title with a fifth-place finish in the final race of the season. Dumarey finished outside the top ten on only one occasion, and achieved a single victory during the season, coming at Magione. Finishing in the runner-up position, seven points adrift of Dumarey, was Renauer Motorsport's Philipp Lietz, who like Dumarey, only finished outside the top ten on one occasion. Lietz won the other race to be held at Magione, and moved ahead of Thomas Ferrando (OverDrive) in the standings, after Ferrando was forced to retire from the final Le Mans race. Ferrando was a double winner during the season, winning both races at the Nürburgring. Eight drivers won races during the season, with no driver winning more than two races. Neal Van Vaerenbergh (Valencia), Wilfred Boucenna (Brands Hatch) and Denis Dupont (Tours) were other double winners, with the remaining race wins taken by Guillaume Rousseau and Gabriele Gardel, at Le Mans.

With championship titles in both classes, PK Carsport were comfortable winners of the teams' championship, which counted points as a whole from both classes. PK Carsport finished 135 points clear of their nearest contenders, TFT – Banco Santander.

== Teams and drivers ==
=== Elite 1 Division ===
Manufacturer	Car	Team	No.	Race Driver	Rounds
Chevrolet	Chevrolet SS	(France) TFT Racing	2	(Spain) Ander Vilariño	All
Chevrolet	Chevrolet SS	(France) TFT Racing	7	(France) Anthony Gandon	All
Chevrolet	Chevrolet SS	(France) RDV Compétition	10	(France) Franck Violas	2
Chevrolet	Chevrolet SS	(France) RDV Compétition	10	(France) Wilfried Boucenna	4–6
Chevrolet	Chevrolet SS	(France) RDV Compétition	23	(France) Romain Iannetta	1–3
Chevrolet	Chevrolet SS	(France) RDV Compétition	23	(France) Hugo Bec	4
Chevrolet	Chevrolet SS	(France) RDV Compétition	23	(France) Franck Violas	5
Chevrolet	Chevrolet SS	(France) RDV Compétition	28	(France) Frédéric Greiling	6
Chevrolet	Chevrolet SS	(Belgium) PK Carsport	11	(Belgium) Bert Longin	All
Chevrolet	Chevrolet SS	(Belgium) PK Carsport	24	(Belgium) Anthony Kumpen	All
Chevrolet	Chevrolet SS	(France) OverDrive	33	(Italy) Gian Maria Gabbiani	1
Chevrolet	Chevrolet SS	(Italy) CAAL Racing	25	(Italy) Nicolò Rocca	All
Chevrolet	Chevrolet SS	(Italy) CAAL Racing	31	(Italy) Fabrizio Armetta	All
Chevrolet	Chevrolet SS	(Italy) CAAL Racing	51	(Italy) Eddie Cheever III	All
Chevrolet	Chevrolet SS	(Austria) DF1 Racing by B66 Raceconsulting	66	(Austria) Mathias Lauda	All
Chevrolet	Chevrolet SS	(Austria) DF1 Racing by B66 Raceconsulting	77	(France) Christophe Bouchut	1–4
Chevrolet	Chevrolet SS	(Austria) DF1 Racing by B66 Raceconsulting	77	(Switzerland) Yann Zimmer	5
Chevrolet	Chevrolet SS	Brazil Team	82	(Brazil) William Ayer, Jr.	1
Chevrolet	Chevrolet SS	Brazil Team	82	(Brazil) Cassiano Rodrigues	2
Chevrolet	Chevrolet SS	Brazil Team	82	(Brazil) Victor Guerin	3–6
Chevrolet	Chevrolet SS	Brazil Team	83	(Brazil) Victor Guerin	1–2
Chevrolet	Chevrolet SS	Brazil Team	83	(Brazil) Cassiano Rodrigues	3–4
Chevrolet	Chevrolet Camaro	(Italy) Events4you by Nocentini	6	(Italy) Fabrizio Del Monte	1
Chevrolet	Chevrolet Camaro	(Italy) Events4you by Nocentini	6	(Italy) Marco Spinelli	4–6
Chevrolet	Chevrolet Camaro	(France) Still Racing	12	(France) Frédéric Gabillon	All
Chevrolet	Chevrolet Camaro	(France) Still Racing	44	(Sweden) Freddy Nordström	All
Chevrolet	Chevrolet Camaro	(France) OverDrive	22	(Italy) Andrea Larini	1–2
Chevrolet	Chevrolet Camaro	(France) OverDrive	22	(France) Wilfried Boucenna	3
Chevrolet	Chevrolet Camaro	(France) Autosport 42	42	(France) Carole Perrin	3
Chevrolet	Chevrolet Camaro	(Brazil) Flag Racing	52	(Brazil) William Ayer, Jr.	2
Chevrolet	Chevrolet Camaro	(France) VTS 85	85	(France) Nicolas Gaudin	2, 6
Chevrolet	Chevrolet Camaro	(Italy) Eurokart Racing Team	88	(Italy) Simone Monforte	All
Chevrolet	Chevrolet Camaro	(United States) Max Papis Racing	99	(Italy) Kevin Gilardoni	1
Dodge	Dodge Challenger	(Belgium) Brass Racing	78	(Belgium) Jerry De Weerdt	6
Ford	Ford Mustang	(Spain) Ford Autolix Competition	1	(Spain) Borja García	All
Ford	Ford Mustang	(Spain) Ford Autolix Competition	4	(Puerto Rico) Victor Gonzalez, Jr.	1
Ford	Ford Mustang	(Spain) Ford Autolix Competition	4	(Spain) Pol Rosell	2
Ford	Ford Mustang	(Spain) Ford Autolix Competition	4	(Spain) Miguel Angel Dasi Perez	3
Ford	Ford Mustang	(Spain) Ford Autolix Competition	4	(Spain) Jose Manuel de Los Milagros	4–6
Ford	Ford Mustang	(Spain) Ford Autolix Competition	19	(Spain) Amir El Hage	1
Ford	Ford Mustang	(France) TFT Racing	3	(Switzerland) Yann Zimmer	1
Ford	Ford Mustang	(France) RDV Compétition	8	(France) Hugo Bec	1–3
Ford	Ford Mustang	(France) RDV Compétition	8	(France) Didier Bec	4–6
Ford	Ford Mustang	(United States) Exotics Racing by Still	9	(France) Romain Thievin	2
Ford	Ford Mustang	(France) Bull Racing Team	13	(France) Guillaume Rousseau	All
Ford	Ford Mustang	(San Marino) GDL Racing	67	(Italy) Gianluca de Lorenzi	5–6
Ford	Ford Mustang	(Austria) Renauer Motorsport	86	(Austria) Dominic Tiroch	All
Toyota	Toyota Camry	(United States) VGJL Motorsports	17	(Puerto Rico) Victor Gonzalez, Jr.	2
Toyota	Toyota Camry	(France) V de V Sport	17	(France) Pierre Roché	3
Toyota	Toyota Camry	(Luxembourg) Racing Club Partners – Marc VDS	32	(Belgium) Bas Leinders	All
Toyota	Toyota Camry	(Luxembourg) Racing Club Partners – Marc VDS	46	(Finland) Markus Palttala	2, 4
Toyota	Toyota Camry	(Luxembourg) Racing Club Partners – Marc VDS	46	(Luxembourg) Nathalie Maillet	5–6

=== Elite 2 Division ===
Manufacturer	Car	Team	No.	Race Driver	Rounds
Chevrolet	Chevrolet SS	(France) TFT Racing	2	(France) Eric Quintal	All
Chevrolet	Chevrolet SS	(France) TFT Racing	7	(Italy) Marsilio Canuti	1
Chevrolet	Chevrolet SS	(France) TFT Racing	7	(Switzerland) Léonard Vernet	2–6
Chevrolet	Chevrolet SS	(France) RDV Compétition	10	(France) Ulysse Delsaux	2–6
Chevrolet	Chevrolet SS	(France) RDV Compétition	23	(France) Ulysse Delsaux	1
Chevrolet	Chevrolet SS	(France) RDV Compétition	23	(France) Frédéric Greiling	2
Chevrolet	Chevrolet SS	(France) RDV Compétition	23	(France) Franck Violas	3–5
Chevrolet	Chevrolet SS	(France) RDV Compétition	28	(France) Franck Violas	6
Chevrolet	Chevrolet SS	(Belgium) PK Carsport	11	(Belgium) Neal Van Vaerenbergh	1
Chevrolet	Chevrolet SS	(Belgium) PK Carsport	11	(Belgium) Jerry De Weerdt	2
Chevrolet	Chevrolet SS	(Belgium) PK Carsport	11	(Belgium) Stienes Longin	3–4
Chevrolet	Chevrolet SS	(Belgium) PK Carsport	11	(Switzerland) Gabriele Gardel	6
Chevrolet	Chevrolet SS	(Belgium) PK Carsport	24	(Belgium) Maxime Dumarey	All
Chevrolet	Chevrolet SS	(France) OverDrive	33	(France) Wilfried Boucenna	1–2
Chevrolet	Chevrolet SS	(Italy) CAAL Racing	25	(Italy) Nicolò Rocca	1
Chevrolet	Chevrolet SS	(Italy) CAAL Racing	25	(Italy) Luca Pirri Ardizzone	2, 4
Chevrolet	Chevrolet SS	(Italy) CAAL Racing	25	(Italy) Lorenzo Marcucci	3
Chevrolet	Chevrolet SS	(Italy) CAAL Racing	25	(Italy) Gianmarco Ercoli	5–6
Chevrolet	Chevrolet SS	(Italy) CAAL Racing	31	(Italy) Francesca Linossi	1
Chevrolet	Chevrolet SS	(Italy) CAAL Racing	31	(Italy) Gianmarco Ercoli	2–4
Chevrolet	Chevrolet SS	(Italy) CAAL Racing	31	(Italy) Leonardo Baccarelli	5–6
Chevrolet	Chevrolet SS	(Italy) CAAL Racing	51	(Italy) Simone Laureti	All
Chevrolet	Chevrolet SS	(Austria) DF1 Racing by B66 Raceconsulting	66	(Italy) Francesca Linossi	2–4
Chevrolet	Chevrolet SS	(Austria) DF1 Racing by B66 Raceconsulting	77	(Italy) Marsilio Canuti	2–3
Chevrolet	Chevrolet SS	Brazil Team	82	(Brazil) Marçal Melo	All
Chevrolet	Chevrolet SS	Brazil Team	83	(Brazil) Alex Fabiano	1–4
Chevrolet	Chevrolet Camaro	(Italy) Events4you by Nocentini	6	(Italy) Alessandro Tonoli	1
Chevrolet	Chevrolet Camaro	(Italy) Events4you by Nocentini	6	(Italy) Ruggero Melgrati	4, 6
Chevrolet	Chevrolet Camaro	(Italy) Events4you by Nocentini	6	(Italy) Marco Spinelli	5
Chevrolet	Chevrolet Camaro	(France) Still Racing	12	(France) Frédéric Greiling	1
Chevrolet	Chevrolet Camaro	(France) Still Racing	12	(France) Stéphane Sabates	2–3, 5
Chevrolet	Chevrolet Camaro	(France) Still Racing	12	(Switzerland) Joaquin Gabarrón	6
Chevrolet	Chevrolet Camaro	(France) Still Racing	44	(France) Joseph Cozzella	1–3
Chevrolet	Chevrolet Camaro	(France) Still Racing	44	(France) Pascal Hugot	6
Chevrolet	Chevrolet Camaro	(France) OverDrive	22	(France) Thomas Ferrando	All
Chevrolet	Chevrolet Camaro	(Brazil) Flag Racing	52	(Brazil) Paulo Bonifacio	2
Chevrolet	Chevrolet Camaro	(France) VTS 85	85	(France) Jack Gaudin	2, 6
Chevrolet	Chevrolet Camaro	(Italy) Eurokart Racing Team	88	(Italy) Erika Monforte	All
Chevrolet	Chevrolet Camaro	(United States) Max Papis Racing	99	(Italy) Luca Pirri Ardizzone	1
Dodge	Dodge Challenger	(Belgium) Brass Racing	78	(Belgium) Jerry De Weerdt	6
Ford	Ford Mustang	(Spain) Ford Autolix Competition	1	(Spain) Salvador Tineo Arroyo	2
Ford	Ford Mustang	(Spain) Ford Autolix Competition	1	(Spain) Amir El Hage	3–6
Ford	Ford Mustang	(Spain) Ford Autolix Competition	4	(Spain) Philippe Valenza	1
Ford	Ford Mustang	(Spain) Ford Autolix Competition	4	(Spain) Miguel Angel Dasi Perez	3
Ford	Ford Mustang	(Spain) Ford Autolix Competition	4	(Spain) Salvador Tineo Arroyo	4
Ford	Ford Mustang	(Spain) Ford Autolix Competition	4	(Spain) Carlos Martínez de Campos	5–6
Ford	Ford Mustang	(Spain) Ford Autolix Competition	19	(Spain) Pablo Gallego	1
Ford	Ford Mustang	(France) TFT Racing	3	(Switzerland) Léonard Vernet	1
Ford	Ford Mustang	(France) RDV Compétition	8	(France) Didier Bec	1, 3–6
Ford	Ford Mustang	(France) RDV Compétition	8	(France) Hugo Bec	2
Ford	Ford Mustang	(United States) Exotics Racing by Still	9	(France) David Perisset	2
Ford	Ford Mustang	(France) Bull Racing Team	13	(France) Jérôme Laurin	1–2, 4
Ford	Ford Mustang	(France) Bull Racing Team	13	(France) Philippe Baudinière	3
Ford	Ford Mustang	(France) Bull Racing Team	13	(France) Guillaume Rousseau	5–6
Ford	Ford Mustang	(San Marino) GDL Racing	67	(Italy) Gianluca de Lorenzi	5–6
Ford	Ford Mustang	(Austria) Renauer Motorsport	86	(Austria) Philipp Lietz	All
Toyota	Toyota Camry	(United States) VGJL Motorsports	17	(United Kingdom) Bradley Smith	2
Toyota	Toyota Camry	(France) V de V Sport	17	(France) Eric van de Vyver	3
Toyota	Toyota Camry	(Luxembourg) Racing Club Partners – Marc VDS	32	(Belgium) Denis Dupont	All
Toyota	Toyota Camry	(Luxembourg) Racing Club Partners – Marc VDS	46	(Luxembourg) Nathalie Maillet	All

== Schedule and results ==
The schedule was announced in December 2013.

=== Elite 1 ===
Round		Race title	Track	Date	Pole position	Fastest lap	Winning driver	Winning manufacturer
1	R1	Valencia NASCAR Fest	(Spain) Circuit Ricardo Tormo, Valencia	12 April	(Belgium) Bert Longin	(Spain) Ander Vilariño	(Switzerland) Yann Zimmer	Ford
1	R2	Valencia NASCAR Fest	(Spain) Circuit Ricardo Tormo, Valencia	13 April	(Spain) Ander Vilariño	(Spain) Ander Vilariño	(Spain) Ander Vilariño	Chevrolet
2	R3	American SpeedFest	(United Kingdom) Brands Hatch (Indy), Swanley	7 June	(Italy) Eddie Cheever III	(Spain) Ander Vilariño	(Italy) Eddie Cheever III	Chevrolet
2	R4	American SpeedFest	(United Kingdom) Brands Hatch (Indy), Swanley	8 June	(Spain) Ander Vilariño	(Spain) Ander Vilariño	(Spain) Ander Vilariño	Chevrolet
3	R5	Tours Speedway	(France) Tours Speedway, Tours	6 July	(Italy) Eddie Cheever III	(Spain) Borja García	(Spain) Ander Vilariño	Chevrolet
3	R6	Tours Speedway	(France) Tours Speedway, Tours	7 July	(Spain) Borja García	(Austria) Mathias Lauda	(Austria) Mathias Lauda	Chevrolet
4	R7	Nürburgring 200	(Germany) Nürburgring (GP/D), Rhineland-Palatinate	19 July	(Spain) Ander Vilariño	(Spain) Ander Vilariño	(Spain) Borja García	Ford
4	R8	Nürburgring 200	(Germany) Nürburgring (GP/D), Rhineland-Palatinate	20 July	(Spain) Ander Vilariño	(France) Frédéric Gabillon	(France) Frédéric Gabillon	Chevrolet
5	R9	Magione – Semifinal	(Italy) Autodromo dell'Umbria, Umbria	20 September	(Italy) Eddie Cheever III	(Spain) Ander Vilariño	(Spain) Ander Vilariño	Chevrolet
5	R10	Magione – Semifinal	(Italy) Autodromo dell'Umbria, Umbria	21 September	(Spain) Ander Vilariño	(Italy) Eddie Cheever III	(Italy) Eddie Cheever III	Chevrolet
6	R11	Le Mans – Final	(France) Bugatti Circuit, Le Mans	11 October	(Spain) Ander Vilariño	(Spain) Ander Vilariño	(Belgium) Anthony Kumpen	Chevrolet
6	R12	Le Mans – Final	(France) Bugatti Circuit, Le Mans	12 October	(Spain) Ander Vilariño	(Italy) Eddie Cheever III	(Italy) Eddie Cheever III	Chevrolet

Oval/Speedway
Road Course

=== Elite 2 ===
Round		Race title	Track	Date	Pole position	Fastest lap	Winning driver	Winning manufacturer
1	R1	Valencia NASCAR Fest	(Spain) Circuit Ricardo Tormo, Valencia	12 April	(Belgium) Neal Van Vaerenbergh	(Belgium) Neal Van Vaerenbergh	(Belgium) Neal Van Vaerenbergh	Chevrolet
1	R2	Valencia NASCAR Fest	(Spain) Circuit Ricardo Tormo, Valencia	13 April	(Belgium) Neal Van Vaerenbergh		(Belgium) Neal Van Vaerenbergh	Chevrolet
2	R3	American SpeedFest	(United Kingdom) Brands Hatch (Indy), Swanley	7 June	(Italy) Marsilio Canuti	(France) Wilfried Boucenna	(France) Wilfried Boucenna	Chevrolet
2	R4	American SpeedFest	(United Kingdom) Brands Hatch (Indy), Swanley	8 June	(France) Wilfried Boucenna		(France) Wilfried Boucenna	Chevrolet
3	R5	Tours Speedway	(France) Tours Speedway, Tours	6 July	(Belgium) Maxime Dumarey	(Belgium) Denis Dupont	(Belgium) Denis Dupont	Toyota
3	R6	Tours Speedway	(France) Tours Speedway, Tours	7 July	(Belgium) Denis Dupont		(Belgium) Denis Dupont	Toyota
4	R7	Nürburgring 200	(Germany) Nürburgring (GP/D), Rhineland-Palatinate	19 July	(France) Thomas Ferrando	(France) Thomas Ferrando	(France) Thomas Ferrando	Chevrolet
4	R8	Nürburgring 200	(Germany) Nürburgring (GP/D), Rhineland-Palatinate	20 July	(France) Thomas Ferrando		(France) Thomas Ferrando	Chevrolet
5	R9	Magione – Semifinal	(Italy) Autodromo dell'Umbria, Umbria	20 September	(Belgium) Maxime Dumarey	(Belgium) Maxime Dumarey	(Belgium) Maxime Dumarey	Chevrolet
5	R10	Magione – Semifinal	(Italy) Autodromo dell'Umbria, Umbria	21 September	(Belgium) Maxime Dumarey		(Austria) Philipp Lietz	Ford
6	R11	Le Mans – Final	(France) Bugatti Circuit, Le Mans	11 October	(France) Guillaume Rousseau	(Belgium) Denis Dupont	(France) Guillaume Rousseau	Ford
6	R12	Le Mans – Final	(France) Bugatti Circuit, Le Mans	12 October	(Belgium) Denis Dupont		(Switzerland) Gabriele Gardel	Chevrolet

Oval/Speedway
Road Course

== See also ==
- 2014 NASCAR Sprint Cup Series
- 2014 NASCAR Nationwide Series
- 2014 NASCAR Camping World Truck Series
- 2014 NASCAR K&N Pro Series East
- 2014 NASCAR K&N Pro Series West
- 2014 NASCAR Whelen Modified Tour
- 2014 NASCAR Whelen Southern Modified Tour
- 2014 NASCAR Canadian Tire Series
- 2014 NASCAR Toyota Series
