= 2015 NASCAR Whelen Euro Series =

Seasons
- ← 2014 2016 →

Locations of the European racing circuits

The 2015 NASCAR Whelen Euro Series was the seventh Racecar Euro Series season, and the third under the NASCAR Whelen Euro Series branding.

The Elite 1 championship was won for the third time in four years by Ander Vilariño in the No. 2 TFT Racing Chevrolet Camaro. He scored three victories during the season, and ultimately won the championship by 35 points ahead of CAAL Racing driver Alon Day, who also took three victories – coming at the final two meetings of the season, at Magione and Zolder – during his first season in the championship. Third place, 13 points further in arrears, was Vilariño's team-mate Romain Iannetta, who won a race at Brands Hatch. Three other drivers won races during the season; Nicolò Rocca was another three-time winner for CAAL Racing, but he finished down in ninth in the drivers' championship, while Eddie Cheever III and defending champion Anthony Kumpen won a race apiece at Valencia and Venray respectively. Rocca won the Race And Win Pole Award for scoring the highest number of pole positions with four; the other two poles went to Day.

The Elite 2 championship was won by Gianmarco Ercoli, who won four races driving his No. 9 Double T by MRT Nocentini Chevrolet Camaro. Ercoli won the championship by 20 points ahead of Philipp Lietz, who won both races at Venray for GDL Racing. Third place in the championship – four points behind Lietz – went to Knauf Racing Team's Thomas Ferrando, who achieved three victories during 2015. The season's other race-winners finished fourth, fifth and sixth in the championship; Stienes Longin won at Tours Speedway for PK Carsport, Salvador Tineo Arroyo won at Magione for CAAL Racing and Dexwet Renauer Team's Florian Renauer was a race-winner at Brands Hatch.

== Teams and drivers ==
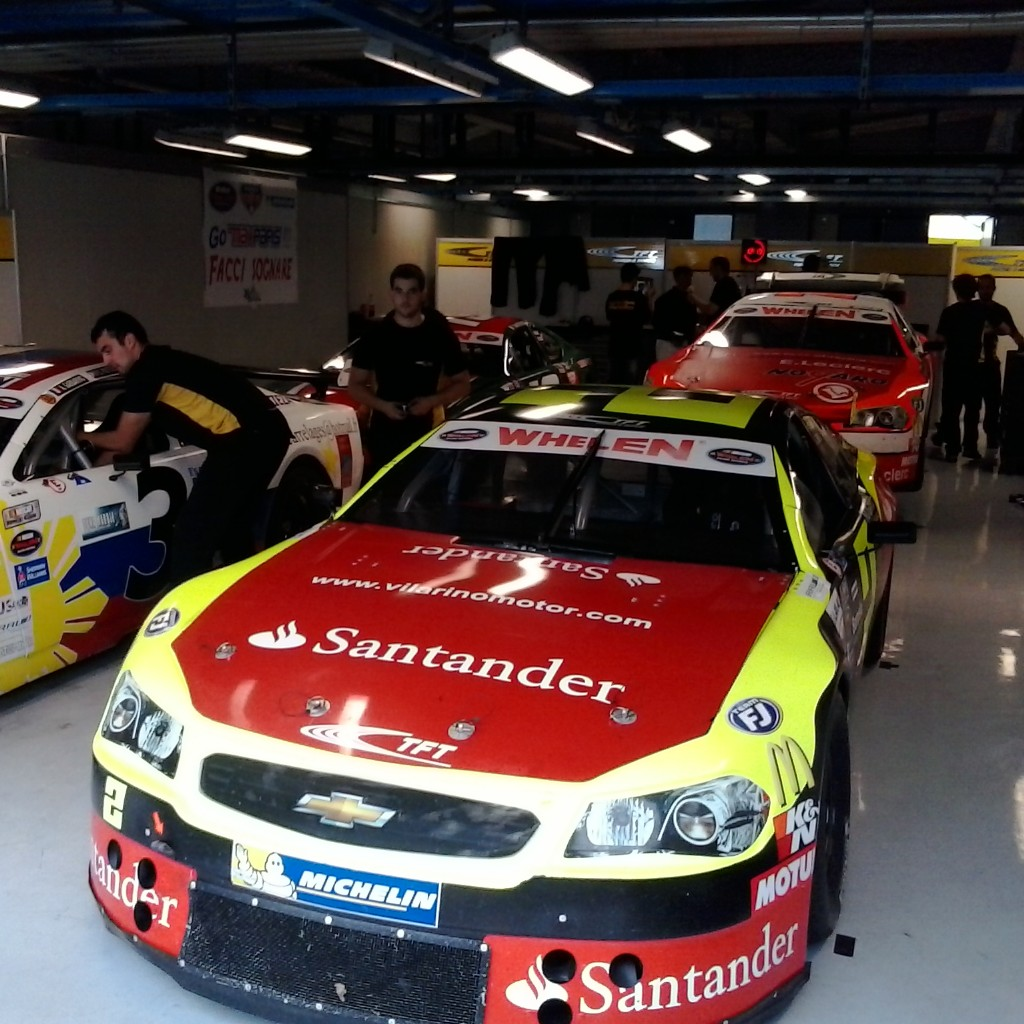
Ander Vilariño, the 2015 Whelen Euro Series champion.

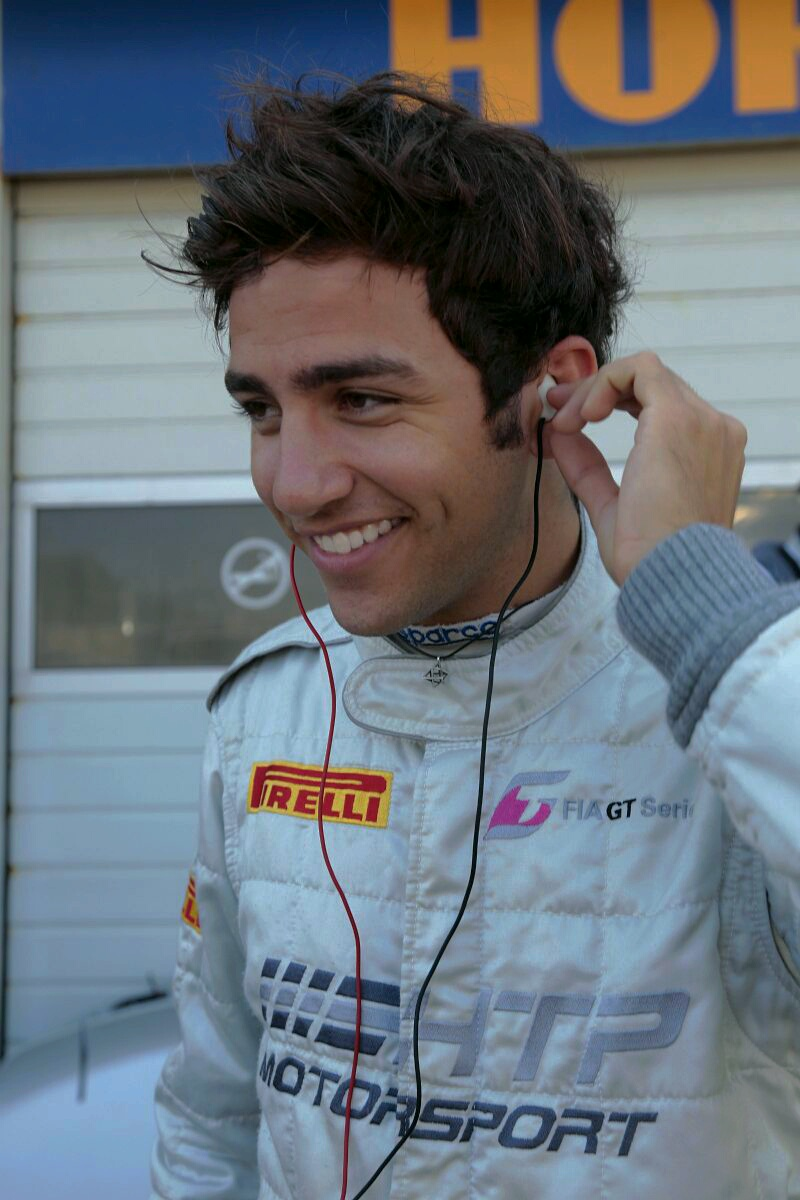
Alon Day finished second in the Elite 1 category.

=== Elite 1 Division ===
| Manufacturer | Car | Team | No. | Race Driver | Rounds |
|---|---|---|---|---|---|
| Chevrolet | Chevrolet SS | (France) TFT Racing | 2 | (Spain) Ander Vilariño | All |
| Chevrolet | Chevrolet SS | (France) TFT Racing | 7 | (France) Romain Iannetta | All |
| Chevrolet | Chevrolet SS | (France) RDV Compétition | 3 | (France) Frédéric Gabillon | All |
| Chevrolet | Chevrolet SS | (Belgium) PK Carsport | 11 | (Belgium) Bert Longin | All |
| Chevrolet | Chevrolet SS | (Belgium) PK Carsport | 24 | (Belgium) Anthony Kumpen | All (Note: In the first race at Raceway Venray, Kumpen's Chevrolet chassis was damaged in a crash with Hugo Bec. For the second race, Kumpen competed in a Ford chassis.) |
| Chevrolet | Chevrolet SS | (Italy) Double T by MRT Nocentini | 12 | (Italy) Fabrizio Armetta | 1–2, 5–6 |
| Chevrolet | Chevrolet SS | (Italy) Double T by MRT Nocentini | 12 | (Italy) Roberto Benedetti | 3–4 |
| Chevrolet | Chevrolet SS | (Brazil) Record News Racing | 21 | (Brazil) William Ayer, Jr. | All |
| Chevrolet | Chevrolet SS | (Italy) CAAL Racing | 51 | (Italy) Eddie Cheever III | 1–4 |
| Chevrolet | Chevrolet SS | (Italy) CAAL Racing | 54 | (Israel) Alon Day | All |
| Chevrolet | Chevrolet SS | (Italy) CAAL Racing | 56 | (Italy) Nicolò Rocca | All |
| Chevrolet | Chevrolet SS | (France) Whelen – Amai.fr | 55 | (United States) Jeffrey Earnhardt | 3 |
| Chevrolet | Chevrolet SS | (France) Whelen – Amai.fr | 55 | (France) Stéphane Sabates | 4–5 |
| Chevrolet | Chevrolet SS | (Austria) DF1 Racing by B66 Raceconsulting | 66 | (France) Christophe Bouchut | 1–3 |
| Chevrolet | Chevrolet SS | (Austria) DF1 Racing by B66 Raceconsulting | 66 | (Austria) Mathias Lauda | 4, 6 |
| Chevrolet | Chevrolet SS | (Austria) DF1 Racing by B66 Raceconsulting | 66 | (Slovakia) Christian Malchárek | 5 |
| Chevrolet | Chevrolet SS | (Austria) DF1 Racing by B66 Raceconsulting | 77 | (United Kingdom) Luke Wright | 1 |
| Chevrolet | Chevrolet SS | (Austria) DF1 Racing by B66 Raceconsulting | 77 | (Germany) Stefan Oberndorfer | 2 |
| Chevrolet | Chevrolet SS | (Austria) DF1 Racing by B66 Raceconsulting | 77 | (France) Wilfried Boucenna | 3 |
| Chevrolet | Chevrolet Camaro | (Italy) Double T by MRT Nocentini | 6 | (Italy) Domenico Schiattarella | 1 |
| Chevrolet | Chevrolet Camaro | (Italy) Double T by MRT Nocentini | 6 | (Italy) Fabrizio Armetta | 3 |
| Chevrolet | Chevrolet Camaro | (Italy) Double T by MRT Nocentini | 6 | (Italy) Cesare Balistreri | 5 |
| Chevrolet | Chevrolet Camaro | (Italy) Double T by MRT Nocentini | 9 | (Italy) Roberto Benedetti | 1–2 |
| Chevrolet | Chevrolet Camaro | (Italy) Double T by MRT Nocentini | 9 | (Italy) Michela Cerruti | 3 |
| Chevrolet | Chevrolet Camaro | (Italy) Double T by MRT Nocentini | 9 | (Italy) Fabrizio Armetta | 4 |
| Chevrolet | Chevrolet Camaro | (Italy) Double T by MRT Nocentini | 9 | (Italy) Gianmarco Ercoli | 5–6 |
| Chevrolet | Chevrolet Camaro | (United States) Precision Performance Motorsports | 46 | (United States) Brandon Gdovic | 5 |
| Chevrolet | Chevrolet Camaro | (San Marino) GDL Racing | 68 | (Italy) Renzo Calcinati | 1–4 |
| Chevrolet | Chevrolet Camaro | (San Marino) GDL Racing | 99 | (Austria) Dominic Tiroch | All |
| Chevrolet | Chevrolet Camaro | (France) VTS 85 | 85 | (France) Nicolas Gaudin | 1–4 |
| Chevrolet | Chevrolet Camaro | (Italy) Eurokart Racing Team | 88 | (Italy) Simone Monforte | 1–4 |
| Ford | Ford Mustang | (Spain) Active Racing Competition | 1 | (Spain) Borja García | 1–2 |
| Ford | Ford Mustang | (Spain) Dasi Racing Team | 4 | (France) Wilfried Boucenna | 1–2 |
| Ford | Ford Mustang | (France) TLC – Leclerc | 4 | (France) Pierre Roché | 4 |
| Ford | Ford Mustang | (Austria) Dexwet Renauer Team | 5 | (Austria) Florian Renauer | All |
| Ford | Ford Mustang | (Austria) Dexwet Renauer Team | 15 | (Czech Republic) Martin Doubek | 2–6 |
| Ford | Ford Mustang | (France) RDV Compétition | 8 | (France) Hugo Bec | All |
| Ford | Ford Mustang | (France) Knauf Racing Team | 37 | (France) Thomas Ferrando | 1–3 |
| Ford | Ford Mustang | (France) Knauf Racing Team | 37 | (France) Wilfried Boucenna | 4–6 |
| Ford | Ford Mustang | (San Marino) GDL Racing | 44 | (Sweden) Freddy Nordström | 1–5 |
| Ford | Ford Mustang | (San Marino) GDL Racing | 67 | (Austria) Philipp Lietz | All |
| Ford | Ford Mustang | (San Marino) GDL Racing | 87 | (Italy) Gianluca de Lorenzi | 6 |
| Ford | Ford Mustang | (Belgium) Brass Racing | 78 | (Belgium) Jerry De Weerdt | All |
| Ford | Ford Mustang | (Belgium) Motorsport 98 | 98 | (Belgium) Eric De Doncker | All |
| Toyota | Toyota Camry | (Luxembourg) Racing Club Partners | 20 | (Belgium) Tim Verbergt | 6 |
| Toyota | Toyota Camry | (Italy) CAAL Racing | 51 | (Italy) Eddie Cheever III | 5–6 |

=== Elite 2 Division ===
| Manufacturer | Car | Team | No. | Race Driver | Rounds |
|---|---|---|---|---|---|
| Chevrolet | Chevrolet SS | (France) TFT Racing | 2 | (Switzerland) Léonard Vernet | All |
| Chevrolet | Chevrolet SS | (France) TFT Racing | 7 | (France) Sébastien Morales | 1 |
| Chevrolet | Chevrolet SS | (France) RDV Compétition | 3 | (France) Ulysse Delsaux | All |
| Chevrolet | Chevrolet SS | (Belgium) PK Carsport | 11 | (Belgium) Stienes Longin | All |
| Chevrolet | Chevrolet SS | (Belgium) PK Carsport | 24 | (Belgium) Martin Van Hove | 1 |
| Chevrolet | Chevrolet SS | (Belgium) PK Carsport | 24 | (Belgium) Maxime Dumarey | 2–4, 6 |
| Chevrolet | Chevrolet SS | (Belgium) PK Carsport | 24 | (Belgium) Bart Van Haeren | 5 |
| Chevrolet | Chevrolet SS | (Italy) Double T by MRT Nocentini | 12 | (Italy) Simone Laureti | 1–4 |
| Chevrolet | Chevrolet SS | (Italy) Double T by MRT Nocentini | 12 | (Italy) Roberto Benedetti | 5–6 |
| Chevrolet | Chevrolet SS | (Brazil) Record News Racing | 21 | (Brazil) Gabriela Prado Arantes | All |
| Chevrolet | Chevrolet SS | (Italy) CAAL Racing | 51 | (Spain) Salvador Tineo Arroyo | 2–4 |
| Chevrolet | Chevrolet SS | (Italy) CAAL Racing | 54 | (France) Carole Perrin | All |
| Chevrolet | Chevrolet SS | (Italy) CAAL Racing | 56 | (Italy) Nicolò Rocca | 1 |
| Chevrolet | Chevrolet SS | (Italy) CAAL Racing | 56 | (Belgium) Guillaume Deflandre | 4 |
| Chevrolet | Chevrolet SS | (Italy) CAAL Racing | 56 | (Italy) Leonardo Baccarelli | 5–6 |
| Chevrolet | Chevrolet SS | (France) Whelen – Amai.fr | 55 | (France) Stéphane Sabates | 4–5 |
| Chevrolet | Chevrolet SS | (Austria) DF1 Racing by B66 Raceconsulting | 66 | (Slovakia) Christian Malchárek | All |
| Chevrolet | Chevrolet SS | (Austria) DF1 Racing by B66 Raceconsulting | 77 | (Belgium) Guillaume Deflandre | 1–3 |
| Chevrolet | Chevrolet Camaro | (Italy) Double T by MRT Nocentini | 6 | (Italy) Ruggero Melgrati | 3–4 |
| Chevrolet | Chevrolet Camaro | (Italy) Double T by MRT Nocentini | 6 | (Italy) Giovanni Altoè | 5 |
| Chevrolet | Chevrolet Camaro | (Italy) Double T by MRT Nocentini | 9 | (Italy) Gianmarco Ercoli | All |
| Chevrolet | Chevrolet Camaro | (United States) Precision Performance Motorsports | 46 | (United States) Brandon Gdovic | 5 |
| Chevrolet | Chevrolet Camaro | (San Marino) GDL Racing | 68 | (Italy) Vittorio Bagnasco | 1–3 |
| Chevrolet | Chevrolet Camaro | (San Marino) GDL Racing | 68 | (France) Arthur Lehouck | 4 |
| Chevrolet | Chevrolet Camaro | (San Marino) GDL Racing | 99 | (Italy) Francesca Linossi | All |
| Chevrolet | Chevrolet Camaro | (France) VTS 85 | 85 | (France) Jack Gaudin | 1–4 |
| Chevrolet | Chevrolet Camaro | (Italy) Eurokart Racing Team | 88 | (Italy) Erika Monforte | 1–4 |
| Ford | Ford Mustang | (Spain) Active Racing Competition | 1 | (Spain) Salvador Tineo Arroyo | 1 |
| Ford | Ford Mustang | (Spain) Dasi Racing Team | 4 | (Spain) Santiago Cañizares | 1 (Note: Santiago Cañizares competed in the Saturday race in Valencia, while Moisés Soriano competed in the Sunday race.) |
| Ford | Ford Mustang | (Spain) Dasi Racing Team | 4 | (Spain) Moisés Soriano | 1 |
| Ford | Ford Mustang | (Spain) Dasi Racing Team | 4 | (France) Eric Van de Vyver | 2 |
| Ford | Ford Mustang | (Spain) Dasi Racing Team | 4 | (Spain) Miguel Angel Dasi Perez | 3 |
| Ford | Ford Mustang | (France) TLC – Leclerc | 4 | (France) Pierre Roché | 4 |
| Ford | Ford Mustang | (Austria) Dexwet Renauer Team | 5 | (Austria) Florian Renauer | All |
| Ford | Ford Mustang | (Austria) Dexwet Renauer Team | 15 | (Czech Republic) Martin Doubek | 2–6 |
| Ford | Ford Mustang | (France) RDV Compétition | 8 | (France) Didier Bec | All |
| Ford | Ford Mustang | (France) Knauf Racing Team | 37 | (France) Thomas Ferrando | All |
| Ford | Ford Mustang | (San Marino) GDL Racing | 44 | (Denmark) Nicki Petersen | 1–4 |
| Ford | Ford Mustang | (San Marino) GDL Racing | 44 | (Belgium) Guillaume Deflandre | 5 |
| Ford | Ford Mustang | (San Marino) GDL Racing | 67 | (Austria) Philipp Lietz | All |
| Ford | Ford Mustang | (San Marino) GDL Racing | 87 | (Belgium) Guillaume Deflandre | 6 |
| Ford | Ford Mustang | (Belgium) Brass Racing | 78 | (Belgium) Jerry De Weerdt | All |
| Ford | Ford Mustang | (Belgium) Motorsport 98 | 98 | (Belgium) Eric De Doncker | All |
| Toyota | Toyota Camry | (Luxembourg) Racing Club Partners | 20 | (Belgium) Philippe Steveny | 6 |
| Toyota | Toyota Camry | (Luxembourg) RCP – Marc VDS | 32 | (Belgium) Denis Dupont | 1 |
| Toyota | Toyota Camry | (Italy) CAAL Racing | 51 | (Spain) Salvador Tineo Arroyo | 5–6 |

== Schedule and results ==
The schedule was announced in September 2014.

=== Elite 1 ===
| Round | | Race title | Track | Date | Pole position | Fastest lap | Winning driver | Winning manufacturer |
|---|---|---|---|---|---|---|---|---|
| 1 | R1 | Valencia American Fest | (Spain) Circuit Ricardo Tormo, Valencia | 25 April | (Italy) Nicolò Rocca | (Spain) Ander Vilariño | (Italy) Eddie Cheever III | Chevrolet |
| 1 | R2 | Valencia American Fest | (Spain) Circuit Ricardo Tormo, Valencia | 26 April | (Spain) Ander Vilariño | (Spain) Ander Vilariño | (Spain) Ander Vilariño | Chevrolet |
| 2 | R3 | Autospeedway American Style | (Netherlands) Raceway Venray, Venray | 23 May | (Italy) Nicolò Rocca | (Italy) Nicolò Rocca | (Italy) Nicolò Rocca | Chevrolet |
| 2 | R4 | Autospeedway American Style | (Netherlands) Raceway Venray, Venray | 24 May | (Italy) Nicolò Rocca | (Belgium) Anthony Kumpen | (Belgium) Anthony Kumpen | Ford |
| 3 | R5 | American SpeedFest | (United Kingdom) Brands Hatch (Indy), Swanley | 6 June | (Italy) Nicolò Rocca | (France) Romain Iannetta | (France) Romain Iannetta | Chevrolet |
| 3 | R6 | American SpeedFest | (United Kingdom) Brands Hatch (Indy), Swanley | 7 June | (France) Romain Iannetta | (France) Romain Iannetta | (Spain) Ander Vilariño | Chevrolet |
| 4 | R7 | Tours Motor Show | (France) Tours Speedway, Tours | 27 June | (Italy) Nicolò Rocca | (Spain) Ander Vilariño | (Italy) Nicolò Rocca | Chevrolet |
| 4 | R8 | Tours Motor Show | (France) Tours Speedway, Tours | 28 June | (Spain) Ander Vilariño | (France) Frédéric Gabillon | (Spain) Ander Vilariño | Chevrolet |
| 5 | R9 | Magione American Style | (Italy) Autodromo dell'Umbria, Umbria | 11 September | (Israel) Alon Day | (Israel) Alon Day | (Israel) Alon Day | Chevrolet |
| 5 | R10 | Magione American Style | (Italy) Autodromo dell'Umbria, Umbria | 12 September | (Israel) Alon Day | (Italy) Nicolò Rocca | (Italy) Nicolò Rocca | Chevrolet |
| 6 | R11 | American Festival Circuit Zolder NASCAR Finals | (Belgium) Circuit Zolder, Heusden-Zolder | 3 October | (Israel) Alon Day | (Israel) Alon Day | (Israel) Alon Day | Chevrolet |
| 6 | R12 | American Festival Circuit Zolder NASCAR Finals | (Belgium) Circuit Zolder, Heusden-Zolder | 4 October | (Israel) Alon Day | (Israel) Alon Day | (Israel) Alon Day | Chevrolet |

Oval/Speedway
Road Course

=== Elite 2 ===
| Round | | Race title | Track | Date | Pole position | Fastest lap | Winning driver | Winning manufacturer |
|---|---|---|---|---|---|---|---|---|
| 1 | R1 | Valencia American Fest | (Spain) Circuit Ricardo Tormo, Valencia | 25 April | (Austria) Florian Renauer | (Austria) Philipp Lietz | (Italy) Gianmarco Ercoli | Chevrolet |
| 1 | R2 | Valencia American Fest | (Spain) Circuit Ricardo Tormo, Valencia | 26 April | (Austria) Philipp Lietz | (Belgium) Stienes Longin | (France) Thomas Ferrando | Ford |
| 2 | R3 | Autospeedway American Style | (Netherlands) Raceway Venray, Venray | 23 May | (Austria) Philipp Lietz | (Austria) Philipp Lietz | (Austria) Philipp Lietz | Ford |
| 2 | R4 | Autospeedway American Style | (Netherlands) Raceway Venray, Venray | 24 May | (Austria) Philipp Lietz | (Spain) Salvador Tineo Arroyo | (Austria) Philipp Lietz | Ford |
| 3 | R5 | American SpeedFest | (United Kingdom) Brands Hatch (Indy), Swanley | 6 June | (Austria) Florian Renauer | (France) Thomas Ferrando | (Austria) Florian Renauer | Ford |
| 3 | R6 | American SpeedFest | (United Kingdom) Brands Hatch (Indy), Swanley | 7 June | (France) Thomas Ferrando | (France) Thomas Ferrando | (France) Thomas Ferrando | Ford |
| 4 | R7 | Tours Motor Show | (France) Tours Speedway, Tours | 27 June | (Belgium) Guillaume Deflandre | (Italy) Gianmarco Ercoli | (Belgium) Stienes Longin | Chevrolet |
| 4 | R8 | Tours Motor Show | (France) Tours Speedway, Tours | 28 June | (Italy) Gianmarco Ercoli | (France) Thomas Ferrando | (Italy) Gianmarco Ercoli | Chevrolet |
| 5 | R9 | Magione American Style | (Italy) Autodromo dell'Umbria, Umbria | 11 September | (France) Thomas Ferrando | (France) Thomas Ferrando | (France) Thomas Ferrando | Ford |
| 5 | R10 | Magione American Style | (Italy) Autodromo dell'Umbria, Umbria | 12 September | (France) Thomas Ferrando | (Austria) Philipp Lietz | (Spain) Salvador Tineo Arroyo | Toyota |
| 6 | R11 | American Festival Circuit Zolder NASCAR Finals | (Belgium) Circuit Zolder, Heusden-Zolder | 3 October | (Italy) Gianmarco Ercoli | (Italy) Gianmarco Ercoli | (Italy) Gianmarco Ercoli | Chevrolet |
| 6 | R12 | American Festival Circuit Zolder NASCAR Finals | (Belgium) Circuit Zolder, Heusden-Zolder | 4 October | (Italy) Gianmarco Ercoli | (Belgium) Stienes Longin | (Italy) Gianmarco Ercoli | Chevrolet |

Oval/Speedway
Road Course

== Championship standings ==
At the final two meetings of the season, double points were awarded in each race.

=== Elite 1 ===
(key) Bold - Pole position awarded by time. Italics - Fastest lap. * – Most laps led.

| Pos | Driver | VAL | | VEN | | BRH | | TOU | | UMB | | ZOL | | Points |
|---|---|---|---|---|---|---|---|---|---|---|---|---|---|---|
| 1 | (Spain) Ander Vilariño | 2 | **1*** | 7 | 2 | 3 | 1 | 3 | **1*** | 2 | 5 | 6 | 6 | 662 |
| 2 | (Israel) Alon Day | 9 | 19 | 11 | 9 | 10 | 3 | 4 | 8 | **1*** | **16** | **1*** | **1*** | 627 |
| 3 | (France) Romain Iannetta | 20 | 5 | 3 | 3 | 1* | **2*** | 15 | 6 | 10 | 2 | 5 | 5 | 614 |
| 4 | (Belgium) Anthony Kumpen | 5 | 3 | 16 | 1* | 5 | 5 | 18 | 9 | 4 | 10 | 3 | 3 | 610 |
| 5 | (Italy) Eddie Cheever III | 1* | 4 | 6 | 5 | 4 | 9 | 6 | 7 | 19 | 18* | 2 | 2 | 599 |
| 6 | (France) Frédéric Gabillon | 18 | 2 | 2 | 4 | 2 | 16 | 2 | 2 | 14 | 3 | 16 | 4 | 587 |
| 7 | (Austria) Philipp Lietz | 8 | 10 | 4 | 8 | 9 | 8 | 8 | 5 | 5 | 17 | 7 | 9 | 575 |
| 8 | (Austria) Florian Renauer | 7 | 7 | 8 | 16 | 6 | 4 | 11 | 14 | 7 | 6 | 10 | 8 | 571 |
| 9 | (Italy) Nicolò Rocca | **3** | 11 | **1*** | **7** | **18** | 22 | **1*** | 3 | 3 | 1 | 18 | DNS | 561 |
| 10 | (France) Wilfried Boucenna | 13 | 6 | 10 | 6 | 21 | 19 | 14 | 10 | 6 | 11 | 9 | 7 | 545 |
| 11 | (France) Hugo Bec | 10 | 16 | 17 | 10 | 13 | 13 | 10 | 11 | 9 | 13 | 11 | 12 | 519 |
| 12 | (Belgium) Bert Longin | 17 | 22 | 5 | 15 | 8 | 6 | 12 | 12 | 15 | 4 | 15 | 17 | 509 |
| 13 | (Austria) Dominic Tiroch | 22 | 12 | DNS | 17 | 11 | 12 | 7 | 18 | 20 | 7 | 8 | 11 | 491 |
| 14 | (Brazil) William Ayer, Jr. | 15 | 20 | 15 | DNS | 17 | 14 | 16 | 16 | 11 | 14 | 14 | 15 | 457 |
| 15 | (Belgium) Eric De Doncker | 12 | 14 | 12 | 13 | 15 | 11 | 17 | 19 | 22 | DNS | 12 | 13 | 452 |
| 16 | (Sweden) Freddy Nordström | 16 | 17 | 9 | 11 | 12 | 10 | 9 | 13 | 8 | 12 | | | 394 |
| 17 | (Belgium) Jerry De Weerdt | 14 | 18 | | | DNS | 15 | DNS | 17 | 12 | DNS | 13 | 14 | 365 |
| 18 | (Italy) Fabrizio Armetta | 21 | 13 | | | 7 | 24 | | | 17 | 9 | 17 | 16 | 344 |
| 19 | (Czech Republic) Martin Doubek | | | DNS | DNS | DNS | DNS | | | DNS | DNS | DNS | 10 | 227 |
| 20 | (Italy) Gianmarco Ercoli | | | 14 | DNS | | | DNS | DNS | DNS | DNS | DNS | DNS | 207 |
| 21 | (Italy) Roberto Benedetti | 11 | 23 | DNS | 12 | 14 | 18 | | | | | | | 159 |
| 22 | (Slovakia) Christian Malchárek | | | 13 | 14 | | | | | 16 | DNS | | | 155 |
| 23 | (Austria) Mathias Lauda | | | | | | | 5 | 4 | | | 22 | DNS | 147 |
| 24 | (Italy) Simone Monforte | 24 | 15 | 18 | DNS | 19 | 21 | | | | | | | 139 |
| 25 | (United States) Brandon Gdovic | | | | | | | | | 18 | 8 | | | 124 |
| 26 | (France) Stéphane Sabates | | | | | | | 20 | DNS | 21 | DNS | | | 124 |
| 27 | (Italy) Cesare Balistreri | | | | | | | | | 13 | 15 | | | 120 |
| 28 | (Belgium) Tim Verbergt | | | | | | | | | | | 4 | DNS | 114 |
| 29 | (Italy) Renzo Calcinati | | | | | | | 19 | 15 | | | | | 76 |
| 30 | (Spain) Borja García | 4 | 9 | | | | | | | | | | | 75 |
| 31 | (Italy) Gianluca de Lorenzi | | | | | | | | | | | DNS | DNS | 68 |
| 32 | (France) Christophe Bouchut | 19 | DNS | | | DNS | DNS | | | | | | | 64 |
| 33 | (Italy) Domenico Schiattarella | 6 | 21 | | | | | | | | | | | 61 |
| 34 | (United States) Jeffrey Earnhardt | | | | | 20 | 7 | | | | | | | 61 |
| 35 | (France) Nicolas Gaudin | | | | | 16 | 17 | | | | | | | 56 |
| 36 | (France) Pierre Roché | | | | | | | 13 | 20 | | | | | 55 |
| 37 | (United Kingdom) Luke Wright | 23 | 8 | | | | | | | | | | | 54 |
| 38 | (Italy) Michela Cerruti | | | | | 22 | 20 | | | | | | | 46 |
| | (France) Thomas Ferrando | DNS | DNS | DNS | DNS | | | | | | | | | 0 |
| Pos | Driver | VAL | | VEN | | BRH | | TOU | | UMB | | ZOL | | Points |

=== Elite 2 ===
(key) Bold - Pole position awarded by time. Italics - Fastest lap. * – Most laps led.

| Pos | Driver | VAL | | VEN | | BRH | | TOU | | UMB | | ZOL | | Points |
|---|---|---|---|---|---|---|---|---|---|---|---|---|---|---|
| 1 | (Italy) Gianmarco Ercoli | 1* | 2* | 5 | 3 | 5 | 8 | 2 | **1*** | 22 | 5 | **1*** | **1*** | 663 |
| 2 | (Austria) Philipp Lietz | 3 | **14** | **1*** | **1*** | 2 | 5 | 4 | 5 | 8 | 2 | 6 | 5 | 643 |
| 3 | (France) Thomas Ferrando | 4 | 1 | 2 | 2 | 16 | **1*** | 3 | 3 | **1*** | **21** | 4 | 4 | 639 |
| 4 | (Belgium) Stienes Longin | 2* | 8 | 6 | 4 | 20 | 3 | 1* | 19 | 2 | 3 | 7 | 2 | 621 |
| 5 | (Spain) Salvador Tineo Arroyo | 20 | 5 | 3 | 5 | 3 | 2 | 6 | 4 | 3 | 1* | 2 | 17 | 620 |
| 6 | (Austria) Florian Renauer | **21** | 3 | 4 | 9 | **1*** | 4 | 7 | 9 | 23 | 7 | 3 | 3 | 589 |
| 7 | (France) Ulysse Delsaux | 6 | 20 | 8 | 7 | 8 | 10 | 5 | 2 | 6 | 9 | 12 | 10 | 572 |
| 8 | (Belgium) Eric De Doncker | 7 | 10 | 11 | 10 | 6 | 9 | 14 | 12 | 17 | 17 | 11 | 8 | 537 |
| 9 | (Italy) Francesca Linossi | 19 | 7 | 12 | 11 | 9 | 7 | 15 | 18 | 21 | 8 | 10 | 9 | 524 |
| 10 | (France) Carole Perrin | 11 | 9 | 10 | 18 | 21 | 11 | 10 | 15 | 14 | 10 | 16 | 6 | 519 |
| 11 | (France) Didier Bec | 15 | 18 | 15 | 15 | 12 | 20 | 9 | 10 | 10 | 18 | 15 | 14 | 490 |
| 12 | (Belgium) Léonard Vernet | 8 | 11 | 13 | 12 | 22 | 15 | 13 | 11 | 19 | 16 | 14 | 12 | 486 |
| 13 | (Belgium) Guillaume Deflandre | 10 | 17 | 7 | 6 | 23 | DNS | **20** | 21 | 20 | 20 | 8 | 18 | 440 |
| 14 | (Belgium) Jerry De Weerdt | 13 | 13 | | | 15 | 16 | 17 | 14 | 12 | 15 | 13 | 13 | 438 |
| 15 | (Brazil) Gabriela Prado Arantes | 18 | 19 | 18 | DNS | 18 | 17 | 18 | 16 | 18 | 19 | 17 | 16 | 429 |
| 16 | (Czech Republic) Martin Doubek | | | 16 | 16 | 7 | 12 | | | 9 | 11 | 9 | 7 | 415 |
| 17 | (Slovakia) Christian Malchárek | DNS | DNS | 19 | 14 | 10 | 14 | 12 | 17 | 15 | 12 | DNS | DNS | 402 |
| 18 | (Belgium) Maxime Dumarey | | | 9 | 8 | 11 | 6 | DNS | DNS | | | 5 | 19 | 319 |
| 19 | (Denmark) Nicki Petersen | 5 | 4 | 20 | 19 | 4 | 13 | 8 | 6 | | | | | 273 |
| 20 | (Italy) Roberto Benedetti | | | | | | | | | 7 | 6 | 19 | 11 | 266 |
| 21 | (Italy) Leonardo Baccarelli | | | | | | | | | 16 | 22 | 18 | 15 | 210 |
| 22 | (France) Stéphane Sabates | | | | | | | 19 | 8 | 13 | 23 | | | 183 |
| 23 | (Italy) Simone Laureti | 12 | 12 | 14 | 13 | 14 | 21 | | | | | | | 178 |
| 24 | (United States) Brandon Gdovic | | | | | | | | | 4 | 4 | | | 160 |
| 25 | (Belgium) Bart Van Haeren | | | | | | | | | 5 | 13 | | | 140 |
| 26 | (Italy) Erika Monforte | 14 | 15 | DNS | DNS | 17 | DNS | | | | | | | 128 |
| 27 | (Italy) Giovanni Altoè | | | | | | | | | 11 | 14 | | | 126 |
| 28 | (France) Pierre Roché | | | | | | | 11 | 7 | | | | | 70 |
| 29 | (Belgium) Martin Van Hove | 16 | 6 | | | | | | | | | | | 66 |
| 30 | (France) Sébastien Morales | 9 | 16 | | | | | | | | | | | 63 |
| 31 | (Belgium) Philippe Steveny | | | | | | | | | | | DNS | DNS | 60 |
| 32 | (France) Arthur Lehouck | | | | | | | 16 | 13 | | | | | 59 |
| 33 | (Italy) Ruggero Melgrati | | | | | 13 | 18 | | | | | | | 57 |
| 34 | (France) Eric Van de Vyver | | | 17 | 17 | | | | | | | | | 54 |
| 35 | (France) Jack Gaudin | | | | | 19 | 19 | | | | | | | 50 |
| 36 | (Spain) Santiago Cañizares | 17 | | | | | | | | | | | | 27 |
| 37 | (Italy) Vittorio Bagnasco | DNS | DNS | | | | | | | | | | | 26 |
| 38 | (Spain) Moisés Soriano | | 21 | | | | | | | | | | | 23 |
| | (Italy) Nicolò Rocca | DNS | DNS | | | | | | | | | | | 0 |
| Pos | Driver | VAL | | VEN | | BRH | | TOU | | UMB | | ZOL | | Points |

== See also ==
- 2015 NASCAR Sprint Cup Series
- 2015 NASCAR Xfinity Series
- 2015 NASCAR Camping World Truck Series
- 2015 NASCAR K&N Pro Series East
- 2015 NASCAR K&N Pro Series West
- 2015 NASCAR Whelen Modified Tour
- 2015 NASCAR Whelen Southern Modified Tour
- 2015 NASCAR Canadian Tire Series
- 2015 NASCAR Mexico Series
