= Whelen Engineering Company =

American warning siren and sign maker

- Company type: Private
- Industry: Public safety
- Founded: 1952 in Deep River, Connecticut
- Founder: George W. Whelen
- Headquarters: Chester, Connecticut, U.S.
- Number of locations: Chester, Connecticut and Charlestown, New Hampshire
- Area served: International
- Products: Emergency lighting
- Services: Building and designing of emergency vehicle equipment
- Divisions: Automotive, Aviation, Outdoor Public Warning, Industrial
- Subsidiaries: Whelen Motorsports
- Website: www.whelen.com

The Whelen Engineering Company is an American corporation that designs and manufactures audio and visual warning equipment for automotive, aviation, and mass notification industries worldwide. Founded in a Deep River, Connecticut garage in 1952, Whelen has become a provider of warning lights, white illumination lighting, sirens, and controllers. Whelen products are designed, manufactured, and assembled in two facilities in Chester, Connecticut and Charlestown, New Hampshire.

== Divisions ==
The Whelen Company is divided into four divisions and has a subsidiary called Whelen Motorsports.

The four divisions of the company are as follows:

1. The Automotive Division — provides lightbars, dashlights, strobe kits, siren boxes, and other public warning systems to be mounted on or within vehicles, rotating sirens, and student alert systems with voice broadcast capability.
2. The Industrial Division — provides public alert hardware for clientele in an industrial plant forum.
3. The Aviation Division — provides warning equipment specifically for use on aircraft or airport directional lighting.
4. The Mass Notification Products Division — provides hardware for mass notification, such as omnidirectional sirens (electronic civil defense sirens), rotating sirens, and student alert systems with voice broadcast capability.

An example product from the Mass Notification Products Division is the Whelen Hornet, which is an electronic civil defense siren introduced in 1995. It contains a single 400-watt speaker. The siren's appearance is best described as a small dish on a square rotator platform, with the single driver located at the center of the horn. It is the smallest outdoor siren made by Whelen. The siren can sound six signals, just like most other sirens produced by Whelen; however, it is not voice-capable like the company's WPS-2900 and WPS-4000 series sirens. Whelen also produced the WPS-3000. The HSS Engineering, a Denmark company that import Whelen 2800s sirens to Denmark as the TWS-295 for civil defense warning/tsunami warning (Malaysia)/or missile (Israel).

== Motorsports ==
Whelen Motorsports is partnered with NASCAR and is the "Officially Licensed Warning Lights of NASCAR." It also sponsors and promotes two of NASCAR's regional touring series: the NASCAR Whelen Euro Series, and the NASCAR Whelen Modified Tour (and formerly the Whelen All-American Series, and the NASCAR Whelen Southern Modified Tour). In the Whelen All-American Series, more than 10,000 drivers compete for championship at 55 NASCAR-sanctioned short tracks within the United States and Canada. Whelen will sponsor the Modified and All-American tours through 2019. Whelen is also an official sponsor of Goulian Aerosports and airshow pilot Michael Goulian.
