= NASCAR Euro Series =

European auto racing series

- Category: Stock cars
- Region: Europe
- Inaugural season: 2009
- Constructors: Chassis built by Team FJ, badged as either Chevrolet, Ford or Toyota
- Engine suppliers: Team FJ
- Tyre suppliers: Hoosier
- Drivers' champion: EuroNASCAR V8GP: (Italy) Vittorio Ghirelli; EuroNASCAR OPEN: (Switzerland) Thomas Toffel
- Teams' champion: (Belgium) PK Carsport
- Official website: nascar.eu

The NASCAR Euro Series (formerly known as Racecar Euro Series, Euro-Racecar NASCAR Touring Series, and NASCAR Whelen Euro Series) is the official NASCAR stock car racing series based in Europe. It is one of NASCAR's four international-sanctioned series, alongside the NASCAR Canada Series, the NASCAR Mexico Series and the NASCAR Brasil Series, and is the only one based in Europe.

== History ==
Euro-Racecar NASCAR Touring Series logo, 2012–June 2013

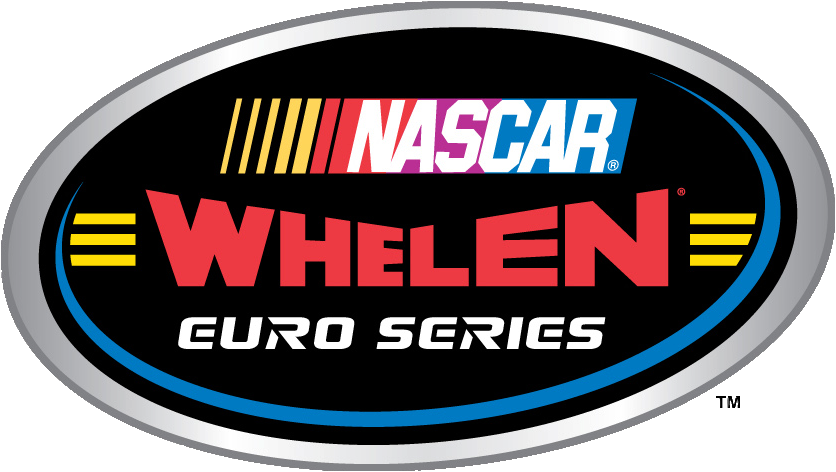
NASCAR Whelen Euro Series logo, June 2013–2017

NASCAR Whelen Euro Series logo, 2017–2024

USA-based NASCAR racing is using V8-powered "stock cars" and focusing mainly on oval tracks with more or less banked corners, Daytona International Speedway being a famous example. In Europe, there are some test tracks with high bankings, but only two tracks have been used for racing by CART Champ Cars, Rockingham Motor Speedway and Eurospeedway in 2001 and 2002. The ASCAR Racing Series brought NASCAR-style racing to mainly the UK from 2001 to 2008.

French rally driver Jérôme Galpin conceived the idea of a European-based stock car racing series after he watched a NASCAR race in 2002. His family group, Team FJ, then launched the Racecar Euro Series in June 2008, and announced that the first season would be held the following year as a FFSA-sanctioned series. The first season in 2009, was held on 7 tracks across France, with 16 cars entering the inaugural race at Nogaro. The series was approved as an International Series by the Fédération Internationale de l'Automobile (FIA) after the series held a race at the Nürburgring in 2010. The calendar was expanded further in 2011, to include more races in Europe.

Galpin began to make connections with NASCAR after he had contact with NASCAR's Senior Development Business Director, Robert Duvall, in June 2009. NASCAR soon took interest in the series, and later in 2010, the then-Racecar Euro Series champion Lucas Lasserre was invited to enter the Toyota All-Star Showdown.

In early 2012, Team FJ entered into an agreement with NASCAR to sanction the series as part of the NASCAR circuit until 2020, though it remains registered as an International FIA series. As part of the agreement, the series changed its name to the Euro-Racecar NASCAR Touring Series.

With the new agreement with NASCAR, the series became an official NASCAR racing series in Europe. NASCAR rules and standards were adopted in the series. The champion was invited to the NASCAR Night of Champions Gala at the NASCAR Hall of Fame in Charlotte, North Carolina, along with the rest of the regional series champions, with the 2012 champion Ander Vilariño being the first to attend.

On July 1, 2013, the series was renamed the NASCAR Whelen Euro Series after Whelen Engineering announced an agreement to become the title sponsor of the series through 2018. This agreement was extended on December 6, 2017, after NASCAR announced that Whelen Engineering would continue to be the title sponsor of both the Euro Series and the NASCAR Whelen Modified Tour until 2024.

On October 4, 2019, the series announced that NASCAR and Team FJ would continue to work together to operate the series until at least 2030. On October 22, 2019, the NASCAR Whelen Euro Series announced that the classes would be rebranded from Elite 1 and Elite 2 to EuroNASCAR PRO (ENPRO) and EuroNASCAR 2 (EN2) for the 2020 season.

== Tracks ==
Locations of the tracks that have held a NASCAR Euro Series/NASCAR Whelen Euro Series/Racecar Euro Series race. Green dots represent current tracks, red dots represent former tracks, and purple dots represent returning tracks.

The following are the tracks which have been used since 2009, currently are in use, or are scheduled to be used in the NASCAR Euro Series as sanctioned by NASCAR:

Years	Track	Location	Type
2016	Adria International Raceway	Adria, Italy	Road course
2017–2019	Autodromo di Franciacorta	Castrezzato, Italy	Road course
2014–2015	Autodromo dell'Umbria	Magione, Italy	Road course
2013	Autodromo Nazionale di Monza	Monza, Italy	Road course
2020–present	Autodromo Vallelunga	Campagnano di Roma, Italy	Road course
2019, 2021–present (Note: Initially scheduled to host a round in 2020, but the round was cancelled because of the COVID-19 pandemic.)	Autodrom Most	Most, Czech Republic	Road course
2020–2022	Automotodrom Grobnik	Čavle, Croatia	Road course
2011–2019, 2021–2026	Brands Hatch	West Kingsdown, England	Road course
2009–2014	Bugatti Circuit	Le Mans, France	Road course
2009	Circuit d'Albi	Albi, France	Road course
2009–2010	Circuit de Lédenon	Lédenon, France	Road course
2009, 2011	Circuit de Nevers Magny-Cours	Magny-Cours, France	Road course
2012	Circuit de Spa-Francorchamps	Stavelot, Belgium	Road course
2009–2010	Circuit du Val de Vienne	Le Vigeant, France	Road course
2009–2013	Circuit Paul Armagnac	Nogaro, France	Road course
2026	Circuit Paul Ricard	Le Castellet, France	Road course
2012, 2014–present	Circuit Ricardo Tormo	Cheste, Spain	Road course
2011	Circuit Zandvoort	Zandvoort, Netherlands	Road course
2015–present	Circuit Zolder	Heusden-Zolder, Belgium	Road course
2009–2010, 2013	Dijon-Prenois	Prenois, France	Road course
2017–2019 (Note: Initially scheduled to host a round in 2021, but the round was cancelled because of the COVID-19 pandemic.)	Hockenheimring	Hockenheim, Germany	Road course
2011	MotorLand Aragón	Alcañiz, Spain	Road course
2023–2025	Motorsport Arena Oschersleben	Oschersleben, Germany	Road course
2010, 2014	Nürburgring	Nürburg, Germany	Road course
2015–2017, 2019, 2024	Raceway Venray	Venray, Netherlands	0.500-mile oval
2012–2016, 2018	Tours Speedway	Tours, France	0.357-mile oval

== Cars ==
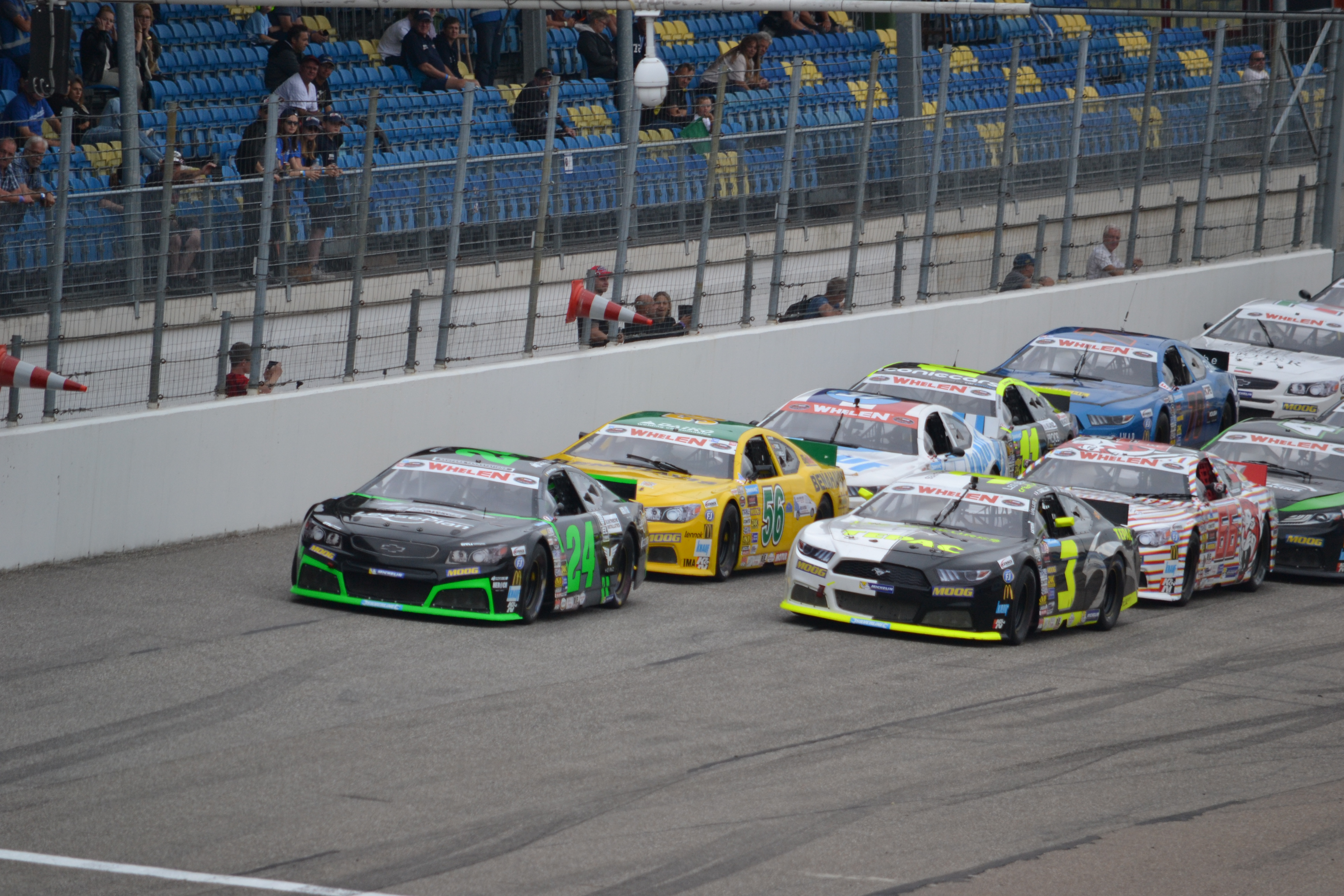
The start of a race at Raceway Venray in 2017

The NASCAR Whelen Euro Series is based around the concept of using NASCAR-style cars on European circuits. The Euro-NASCAR cars are inspired by American NASCAR cars but were built specifically for European tracks. The cars use a V8 engine creating 450 hp (340 kW). It uses a four-speed manual gearbox, is rear-wheel drive and weighs 1,225 kg (2,701 lb).

A new generation of car, dubbed as the "Next Level" package, was introduced in the 2016 season. The Next Level car saw the introduction of a new aerodynamic package and a redesigned composite body, and the cars adopted an 8-inch rear spoiler instead of the wing used in the previous generation of cars.

The first Next Level car to be introduced was the redesigned Chevrolet SS composite body, which was unveiled during the 2015 season-ending race at Circuit Zolder. Resembling the body of its American counterpart, the car made its racing debut in the 2015 Race of Champions. The Ford Mustang body also made its test debut soon after. Starting in 2018, the Chevrolet composite body was updated into a Camaro ZL1-based body style, although the SS body is still legal for competition until the end of the 2019 season. The SS nameplate was subsequently retired in 2020 and existing bodies from the SS platform was rebranded into the EuroNASCAR FJ 2020. The revived Shadow Racing Cars brand would begin to compete with their own Shadow DNM8 chassis starting from the 2021 season.

NASCAR Whelen Euro Series became the first NASCAR series to introduce sequential gearboxes after it was announced on 25 March 2021 that sequential gearboxes will be made available as an optional choice in 2021, predating NASCAR Cup Series' introduction of the sequential gearboxes with the Next Gen car by one year. A new NASCAR Whelen Euro Series car is available to be purchased from Team FJ at a price of €89,000 in 2021.

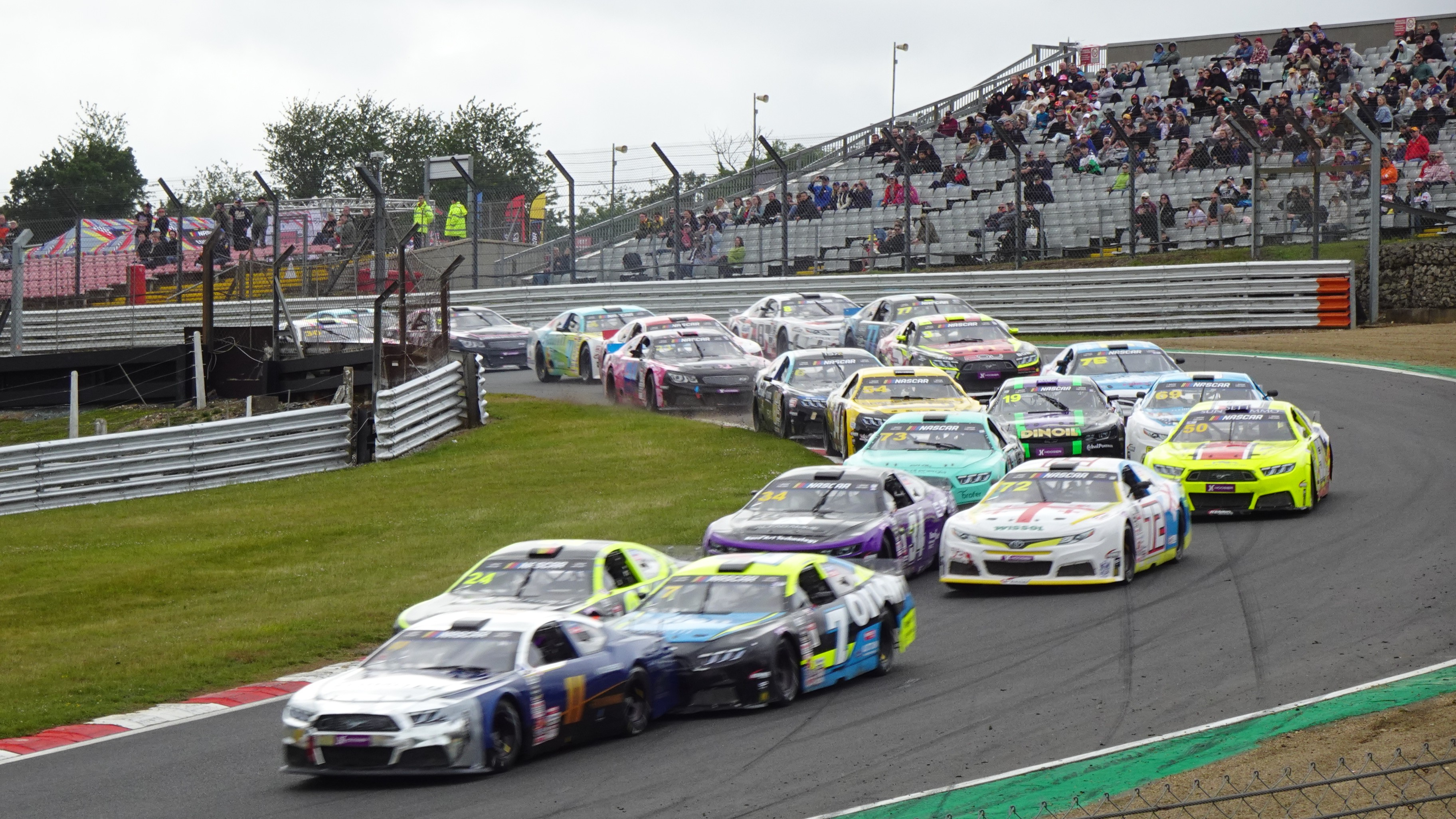
Euro Series racing at Brands Hatch in 2026

NASCAR Whelen Euro Series currently featured Hoosier as the exclusive tyre supplier of the series. Previously, Michelin was the exclusive tyre supplier from the inaugural season in 2009 until 2017 while subsidiary company BFGoodrich became the exclusive tyre supplier for the 2018 season only. In 2019, Continental AG signed a six-year contract to become the exclusive tyre supplier of the series. The deal was renewed on January 22, 2021, extending the tyre supply contract until 2027. General Tire was selected as the tyre brand of choice in the 2019 and 2020 season before it was switched to the Hoosier brand for the 2021 season.

On 3 May 2022, NASCAR Whelen Euro Series announced a new partnership deal with VP Racing Fuels to become the new exclusive fuel supplier in the series, switching from a previously undisclosed fuel supplier. The series will now use VP's N20 Race Fuel, an unleaded gasoline sustainable fuel that incorporates 20% sustainable materials and is complying to both FIA Appendix J and European Union's E10 road fuel regulations. The series will be working together with VP to further develop the sustainable fuel with an aim to become fossil fuel free by the 2025 season.

Outside of NASCAR Euro Series competition, the NASCAR Euro Series cars are used in the Race of Champions.

== Specifications ==
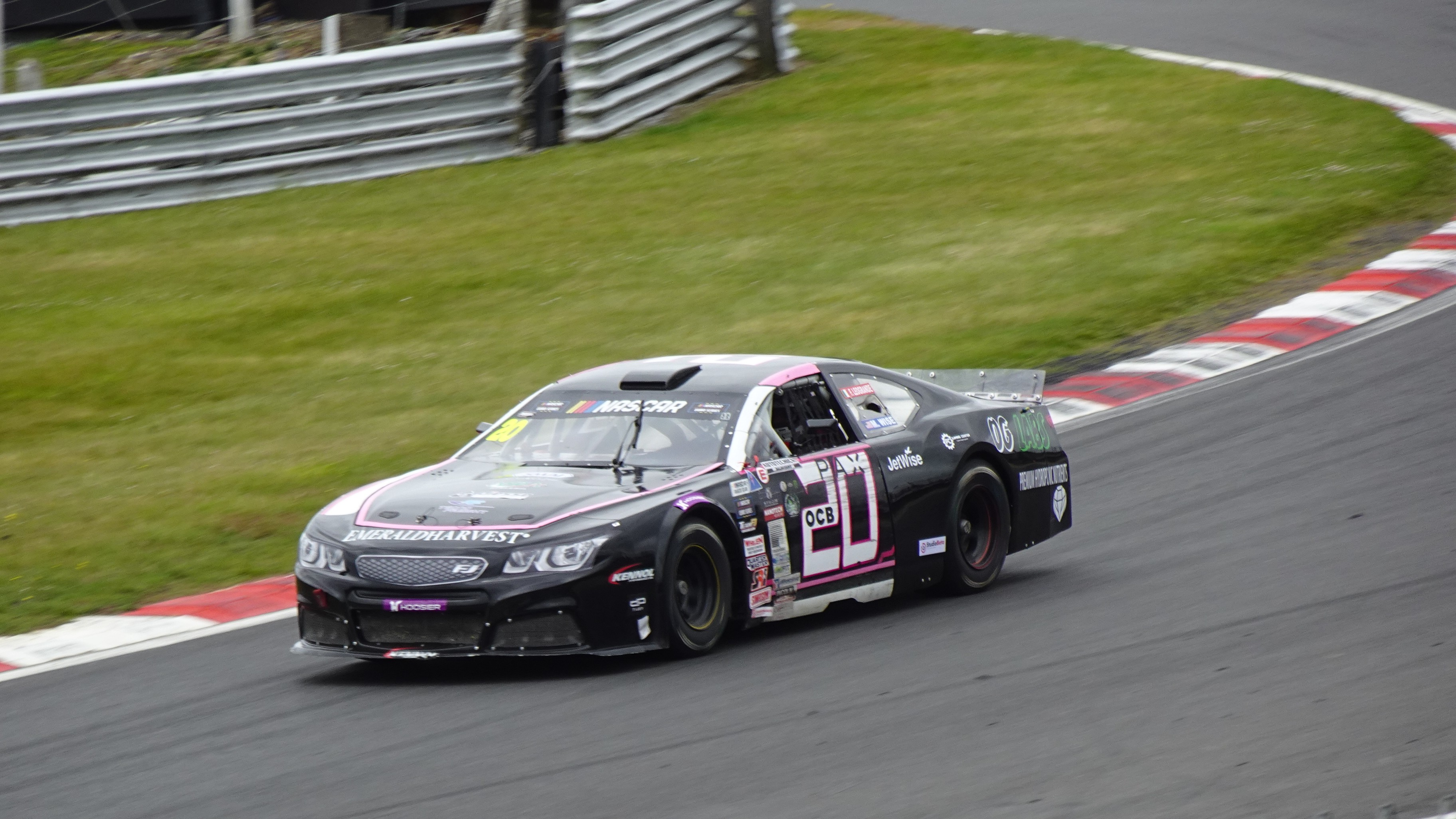
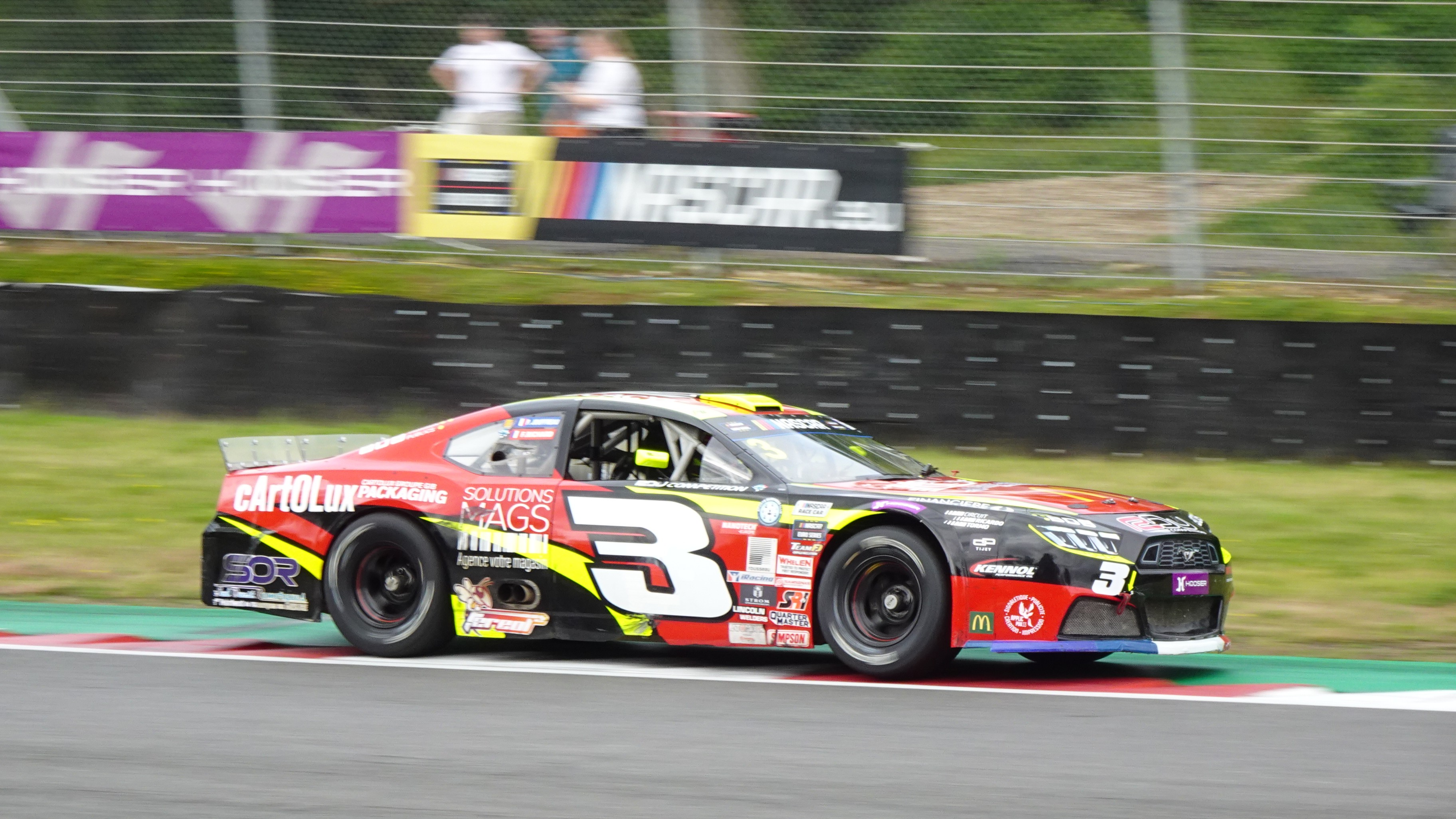
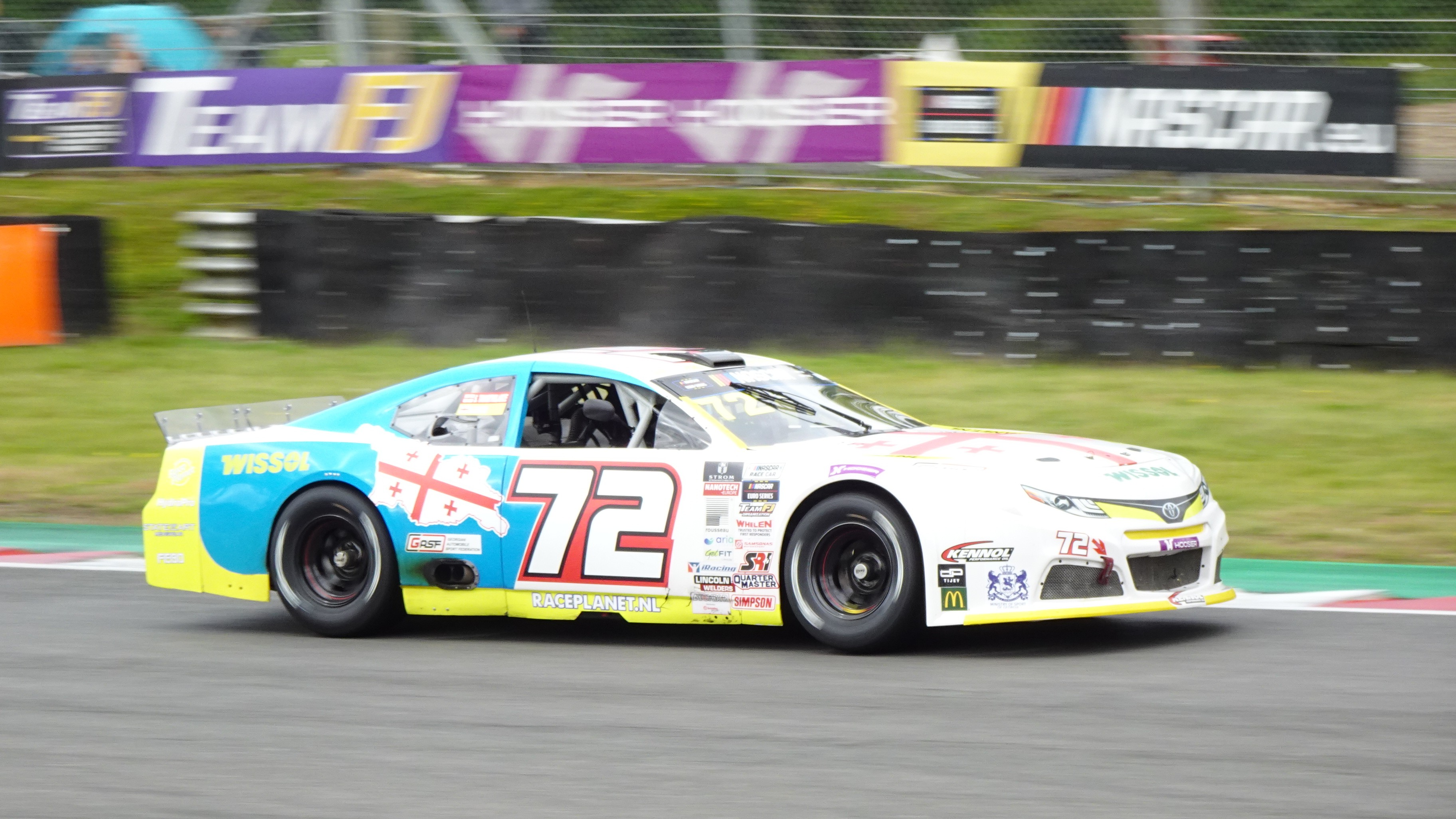
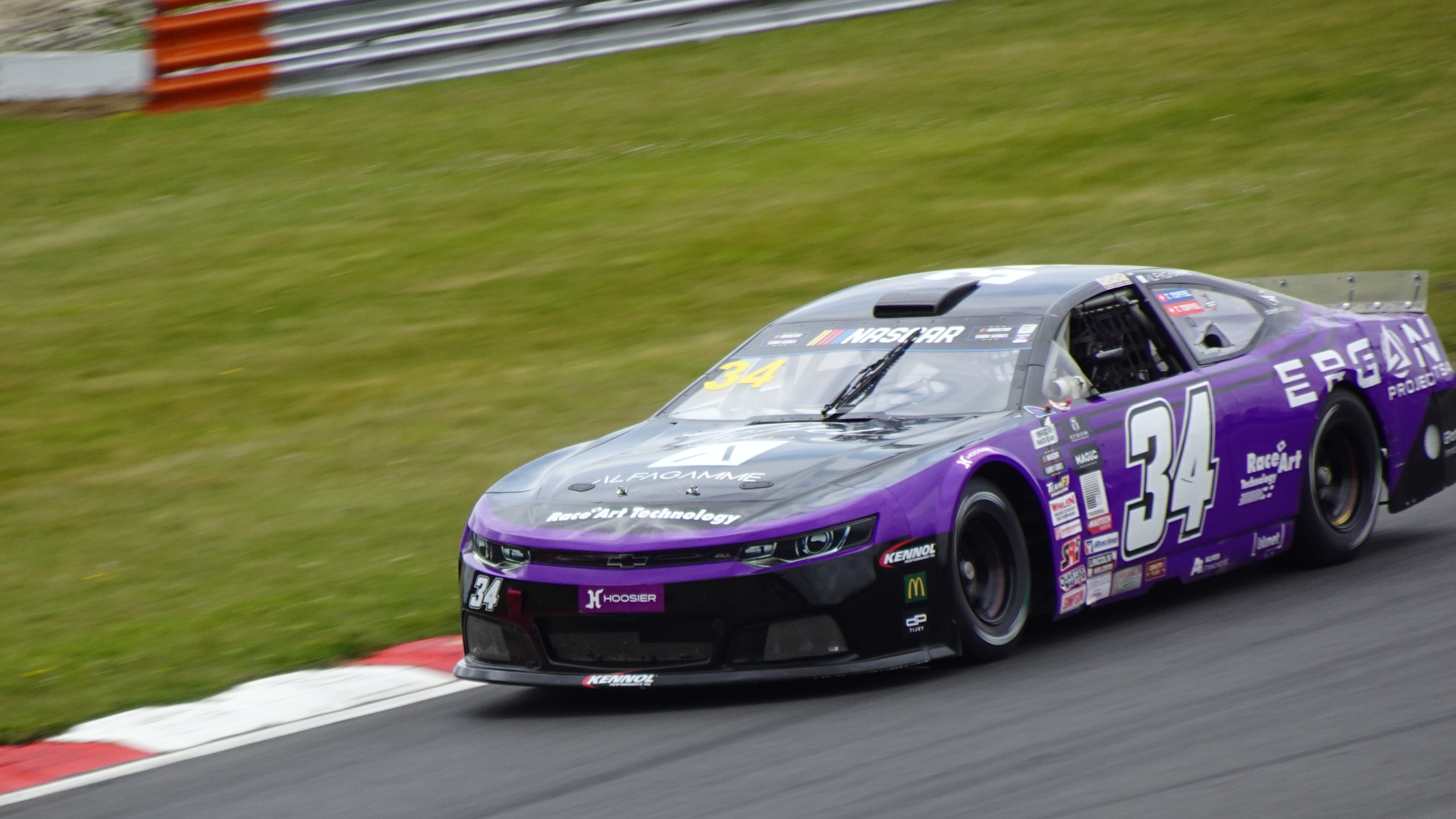
Current available models includes the Chevrolet SS (top-left, now running under the EuroNASCAR FJ 2020 monicker), Ford Mustang (top-right), Toyota Camry (bottom-left), and Chevrolet Camaro (bottom-right).
- Chassis: FIA-certified tubular steel tube frame with safety roll cage.
- Engine Displacement: 5.7 L (5,700 cc) (350 in³) V8.
- Aspiration: Naturally aspirated.
- Transmission: 4 Speed manual or sequential.
- Fuel: VP Racing Fuels N20 Race Fuel
- Power: 450 hp (340 kW)
- Weight: 1,225 kg (2,701 lb)
- Height: 1,300 mm (51 in)
- Length: 5,080 mm (200 in)
- Wheelbase: 2,740 mm (108 in)
- Width: 1,950 mm (77 in)

As manufacturer involvement is limited, model representations are used for aesthetic purposes only. The current models available are the EuroNASCAR FJ 2020, Ford Mustang, Chevrolet Camaro, Shadow DNM8, and Toyota Camry. The Dodge Challenger model was available to be used in the past before it was retired after Dodge pulled out factory support for all NASCAR series outside of Canada in 2012, while the Chevrolet SS model was retired after it was rebranded into the EuroNASCAR FJ 2020 in 2020.

== Championships ==
- EuroNASCAR PRO drivers championship – Main championship open to gold/silver/bronze drivers
  - Junior Trophy – For drivers aged 25 years and under
  - Challenger Trophy – For amateur drivers
- EuroNASCAR OPEN drivers championship – Restricted to silver/bronze drivers
  - Legend Trophy – For drivers aged 40 years and over
  - Rookie Cup – For drivers making their Euro Series debuts, regardless of age or experience
  - Lady Cup – For female drivers
- EuroNASCAR Teams championship – Scored by points collected by each car in EuroNASCAR PRO and EuroNASCAR OPEN divisions

The Euro Series champions and other standout drivers of the series will be honored at the yearly NASCAR Home Tracks Champions Awards at the NASCAR Hall of Fame. Until the 2014 season, the EuroNASCAR PRO champion would win an entry into a NASCAR race, the UNOH Battle at the Beach (formerly the Toyota All-Star Showdown), while the EuroNASCAR OPEN champion would win a NASCAR test.

A NASCAR Euro Series race week is run over three days and includes four races, two EuroNASCAR PRO races and two EuroNASCAR OPEN races. Practice is held on Friday, followed by qualifying and the first races of EuroNASCAR PRO and EuroNASCAR OPEN on Saturday, before the week closes with the second races of EuroNASCAR PRO and EuroNASCAR OPEN on Sunday. The only exception to this were the race at Venray in 2019, which was run over two days and only included one race each for both classes and the 2020 race at Vallelunga, which was held using a condensed variant of the schedule as part of the sporting regulation changes made as a response to the COVID-19 pandemic.

== Champions ==
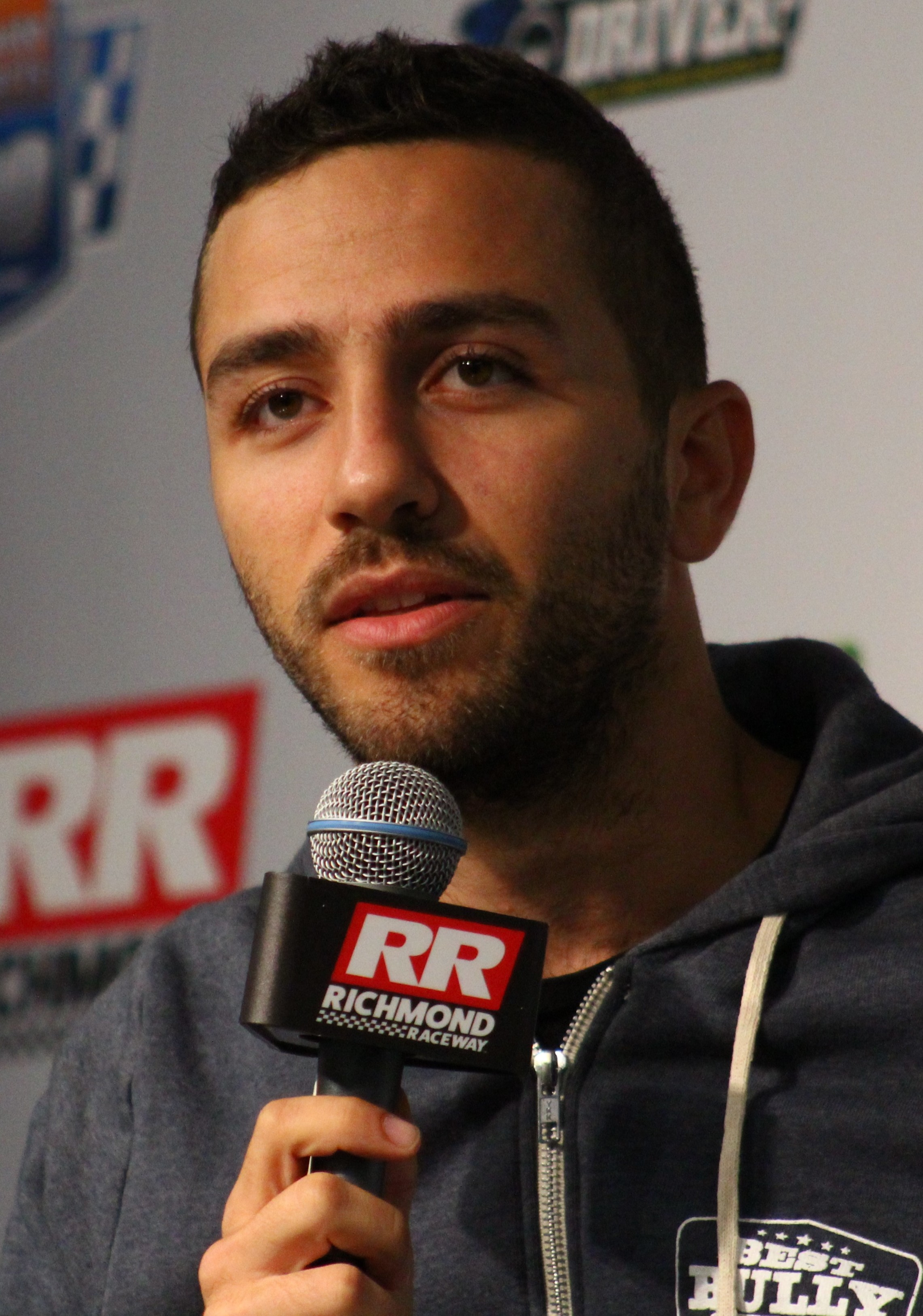
Four-time EuroNASCAR champion Alon Day.

Season	NASCAR Euro Series V8GP Champion	NASCAR Euro Series OPEN Champion	Rookie Challenge Season Champion	Team Champion
Racecar Euro Series
2009	(France) Lucas Lasserre	(France) Wilfried Boucenna		
2010	(France) Lucas Lasserre (2)	(France) Emmanuel Brigand		
2011	(France) Éric Hélary	(France) Romain Fournillier		(France) Hélary Racing Team
Euro-Racecar NASCAR Touring Series
2012	(Spain) Ander Vilariño	(France) Simon Escallier		(France) Exotics Racing - Still Racing
NASCAR Whelen Euro Series
2013	(Spain) Ander Vilariño (2)	(France) Anthony Gandon		(France) TFT - Banco Santander
2014	(Belgium) Anthony Kumpen	(Belgium) Maxime Dumarey		(Belgium) PK Carsport
2015	(Spain) Ander Vilariño (3)	(Italy) Gianmarco Ercoli		(San Marino) GDL Racing
2016	(Belgium) Anthony Kumpen (2)	(Belgium) Stienes Longin		(Belgium) PK Carsport (2)
2017	(Israel) Alon Day	(France) Thomas Ferrando	(Austria) Andreas Kuchelbacher	(France) Knauf Racing
2018	(Israel) Alon Day (2)	(France) Ulysse Delsaux	(India) Advait Deodhar	(France) RDV Compétition
2019	(Netherlands) Loris Hezemans	(Denmark) Lasse Sørensen	(France) Alain Mosqueron	(Netherlands) Hendriks Motorsport
2020	(Israel) Alon Day (3)	(Italy) Vittorio Ghirelli	(France) Alain Mosqueron (2)	(Netherlands) Hendriks Motorsport (2)
2021	(Netherlands) Loris Hezemans (2)	(Czech Republic) Martin Doubek	(United Kingdom) Gordon Barnes	(Netherlands) Hendriks Motorsport (3)
2022	(Israel) Alon Day (4)	(Netherlands) Liam Hezemans	(United Kingdom) Gordon Barnes (2)	(Netherlands) Hendriks Motorsport (4)
2023	(Italy) Gianmarco Ercoli	(France) Paul Jouffreau	(United Kingdom) Gordon Barnes (3)	(France) RDV Compétition (2)
2024	(Italy) Vittorio Ghirelli	(Czech Republic) Martin Doubek (2)	(Italy) Federico Monti	(France) RDV Compétition (3)
NASCAR Euro Series
2025	(Italy) Vittorio Ghirelli (2)	(Greece) Thomas Krasonis	(Spain) Jose Penalta	(Netherlands) Team Bleekemolen
2026	(Italy) Vittorio Ghirelli (3)	(Switzerland) Thomas Toffel	(France) Yann Cristovao	(Belgium) PK Carsport (3)

== All-time wins ==
All-time wins for the NASCAR Euro Series under NASCAR official sanctioning, starting from the 2012 season; does not include Racecar Euro Series wins. All figures correct as of the 2023 EuroNASCAR Finals at Circuit Zolder (October 15, 2023).

Key
	Driver competed full-time in the 2026 season
	Driver competed part-time in the 2026 season
**Bold**	NASCAR Euro Series V8GP Champion
Italics	NASCAR Euro Series OPEN Champion

=== NASCAR Euro Serie V8GP ===
Driver	Wins	First	Last
(Israel) **Alon Day**	32	2015 Umbria 1	2022 Rijeka 1
(Spain) **Ander Vilariño**	22	2012 Nogaro 1	2019 Valencia 2
(Italy) **Vittorio Ghirelli**	19	2021 Most 2	2026 Brands Hatch 1
(Italy) **Gianmarco Ercoli**	15	2018 Brands Hatch 2	2026 Most 2
(France) Frédéric Gabillon	12	2013 Tours 1	2019 Brands Hatch 2
(Netherlands) **Loris Hezemans**	11	2018 Hockenheim 1	2021 Rijeka 1
(France) Paul Jouffreau	10	2023 Most 2	2026 Zolder 2
(Belgium) **Anthony Kumpen**	10	2014 Le Mans 1	2017 Hockenheim 2
(Netherlands) Liam Hezemans	5	2023 Valencia 1	2025 Oschersleben 1
(Spain) Borja García	5	2014 Nürburgring 1	2017 Hockenheim 1
(Italy) Nicolò Rocca	5	2015 Venray 1	2022 Valencia 1
(Italy) Eddie Cheever III	4	2014 Brands Hatch 1	2015 Valencia 1
(Belgium) Stienes Longin	3	2019 Zolder 2	2021 Zolder 1
(France) Lucas Lasserre	3	2018 Franciacorta 2	2023 Zolder 1
(France) Gael Castelli	2	2012 Le Mans 1	2012 Le Mans 2
(Switzerland) Yann Zimmer	2	2013 Monza 2	2014 Valencia 1
(France) Romain Iannetta	2	2012 Spa 2	2015 Brands Hatch 1
(Denmark) Lasse Sørensen	2	2020 Zolder 1	2020 Valencia 1
(Canada) Jacques Villeneuve	2	2021 Vallelunga 1	2021 Vallelunga 2
(Germany) Tobias Dauenhauer	2	2023 Oschersleben 2	2023 Zolder 2
(Greece) Thomas Krasonis	1	2025 Valencia 2	2025 Valencia 2
(Spain) Javier Villa	1	2012 Brands Hatch 2	2012 Brands Hatch 2
(Austria) Mathias Lauda	1	2014 Tours 2	2014 Tours 2
(Belgium) Marc Goossens	1	2017 Zolder 2	2017 Zolder 2
(France) Thomas Ferrando	1	2019 Zolder 1	2019 Zolder 1
(Sweden) Alexander Graff	1	2022 Brands Hatch 2	2022 Brands Hatch 2
(Netherlands) Sebastiaan Bleekemolen	1	2022 Most 1	2022 Most 1
(France) Patrick Lemarié	1	2022 Rijeka 2	2022 Rijeka 2

=== Elite 2 / EuroNASCAR OPEN (ENOPEN) ===
Driver	Wins	First	Last
(France) Thomas Ferrando	12	2014 Nürburgring 1	2017 Zolder 2
(Belgium) Stienes Longin	9	2015 Tours 1	2016 Zolder 2
(Germany) Tobias Dauenhauer	8	2020 Vallelunga 1	2021 Vallelunga 1
(Australia) Josh Burdon	7	2013 Nogaro 1	2013 Le Mans 1
(Denmark) Lasse Sørensen	7	2019 Franciacorta 1	2019 Zolder 2
(Czech Republic) Martin Doubek	7	2020 Zolder 1	2021 Vallelunga 2
(Italy) Alberto Naska	7	2022 Valencia 2	2023 Most 2
(Greece) Thomas Krasonis	6	2025 Valencia 1	2025 Zolder 1
(Italy) Vittorio Ghirelli	6	2019 Venray	2020 Valencia 4
(Netherlands) Liam Hezemans	6	2022 Brands Hatch 2	2022 Rijeka 2
(Cyprus) Vladimiros Tziortzis	6	2022 Valencia 1	2023 Most 1
(France) Anthony Gandon	4	2013 Dijon 1	2013 Le Mans 2
(Italy) **Gianmarco Ercoli**	4	2015 Valencia 1	2015 Zolder 2
(France) Wilfried Boucenna	4	2014 Brands Hatch 1	2018 Valencia 2
(France) Ulysse Delsaux	4	2017 Valencia 1	2018 Hockenheim 1
(Austria) Philipp Lietz	3	2014 Umbria 2	2015 Tours 2
(Switzerland) Gabriele Gardel	3	2014 Le Mans 2	2016 Zolder 1
(Brazil) Felipe Rabello	3	2017 Venray 1	2018 Franciacorta 1
(Belgium) Guillaume Deflandre	3	2017 Zolder 2	2018 Hockenheim 2
(France) Florian Venturi	3	2018 Brands Hatch 2	2019 Franciacorta 2
(Switzerland) Giorgio Maggi	3	2019 Valencia 1	2019 Hockenheim 1
(France) Paul Jouffreau	3	2023 Vallelunga 2	2023 Zolder 2
(Belgium) Martin van Hove	2	2012 Nogaro 1	2012 Nogaro 2
(France) Simon Escallier	2	2012 Valencia 1	2012 Valencia 2
(France) Olivier Porta	2	2012 Le Mans 1	2012 Le Mans 2
(Belgium) Neal Van Vaerenbergh	2	2014 Valencia 1	2014 Valencia 2
(Belgium) Denis Dupont	2	2014 Tours 1	2014 Tours 2
(Spain) Salvador Tineo Arroyo	2	2015 Umbria 2	2016 Brands Hatch 2
(Belgium) Guillaume Dumarey	2	2018 Franciacorta 2	2018 Zolder 2
(France) Vincent Gonneau	1	2012 Brands Hatch 1	2012 Brands Hatch 1
(Brazil) Adriano Medeiros	1	2012 Brands Hatch 2	2012 Brands Hatch 2
(Belgium) Loic Deman	1	2012 Spa 1	2012 Spa 1
(Belgium) Marc Duez	1	2012 Spa 2	2012 Spa 2
(France) Julien Goupy	1	2013 Tours 1	2013 Tours 1
(Belgium) Maxime Dumarey	1	2014 Umbria 1	2014 Umbria 1
(France) Guillaume Rousseau	1	2014 Le Mans 1	2014 Le Mans 1
(Austria) Florian Renauer	1	2015 Brands Hatch 1	2015 Brands Hatch 1
(Italy) Riccardo Geltrude	1	2016 Tours 1	2016 Tours 1
(Italy) Denny Zardo	1	2017 Franciacorta 2	2017 Franciacorta 2
(Italy) Nicholas Risitano	1	2019 Valencia 2	2019 Valencia 2
(India) Advait Deodhar	1	2021 Brands Hatch 1	2021 Brands Hatch 1
(Israel) Naveh Talor	1	2021 Zolder 1	2021 Zolder 1
(Austria) Patrick Schober	1	2023 Oschersleben 2	2023 Oschersleben 2
(Luxembourg) Gil Linster	1	2023 Zolder 1	2023 Zolder 1
(Scotland) Jack Davidson	1	2024 Brands Hatch 2	2024 Brands Hatch 2

== See also ==
- Speedcar Series
- ASCAR Racing Series
