= Jeffrey Earnhardt =

American racing driver (born 1989)

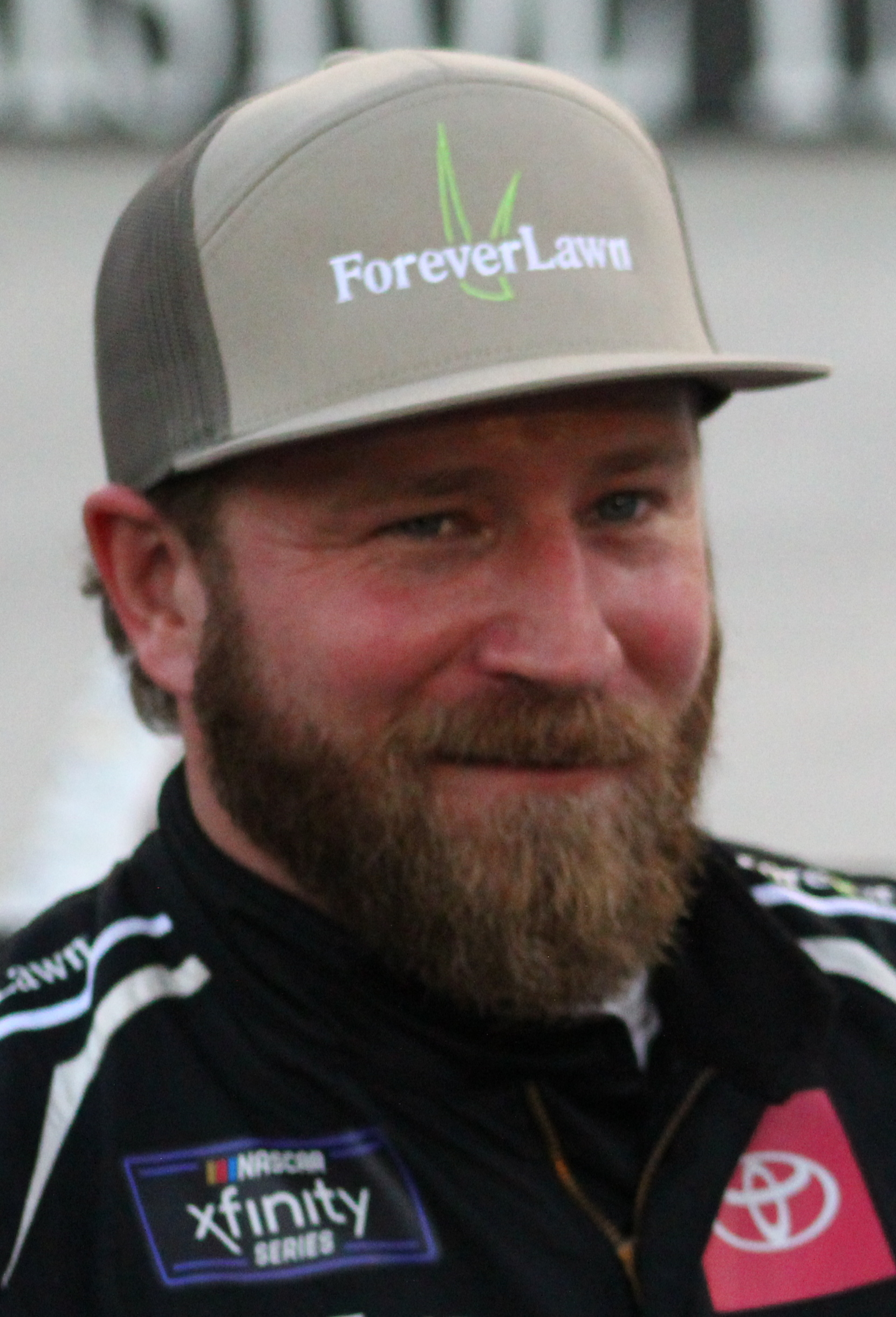
- Earnhardt at Bristol Motor Speedway in 2024
- Born: Jeffrey Lynn Earnhardt; June 22, 1989 (age 37); Mooresville, North Carolina, U.S.
- Awards: 2007 Busch East Series Most Popular Driver

NASCAR Cup Series career
- 76 races run over 5 years
- 2019 position: 50th
- Best finish: 36th (2017)
- First race: 2015 Federated Auto Parts 400 (Richmond)
- Last race: 2019 GEICO 500 (Talladega)
Wins	Top tens	Poles
0	0	0

NASCAR O'Reilly Auto Parts Series career
- 176 races run over 13 years
- 2025 position: 50th
- Best finish: 18th (2014)
- First race: 2009 Zippo 200 at the Glen (Watkins Glen)
- Last race: 2025 Food City 300 (Bristol)
Wins	Top tens	Poles
0	6	1

NASCAR FedEx Freight Truck Series career
- 11 races run over 3 years
- 2024 position: 75th
- Best finish: 38th (2011)
- First race: 2009 CampingWorld.com 200 (Gateway)
- Last race: 2024 North Carolina Education Lottery 200 (Charlotte)
Wins	Top tens	Poles
0	1	0

NASCAR Canada Series career
- 1 race run over 1 year
- 2016 position: 45th
- Best finish: 45th (2016)
- First race: 2016 Can-Am 50 Tours (Trois-Rivières)
Wins	Top tens	Poles
0	1	0

ARCA Menards Series East career
- 25 races run over 3 years
- Best finish: 5th (2007)
- First race: 2007 Greased Lightning 150 (Greenville-Pickens)
- Last race: 2009 Long John Silver's 200 (Iowa)
Wins	Top tens	Poles
0	13	1
- Statistics up to date as of November 1, 2025.

Jeffrey Lynn Earnhardt (born June 22, 1989) is an American professional stock car racing driver. He last competed part-time in the NASCAR Xfinity Series, driving the No. 24 Toyota GR Supra for Sam Hunt Racing. He is the son of Kerry Earnhardt, grandson of Dale Earnhardt, and nephew of Dale Earnhardt Jr.

== Racing career ==
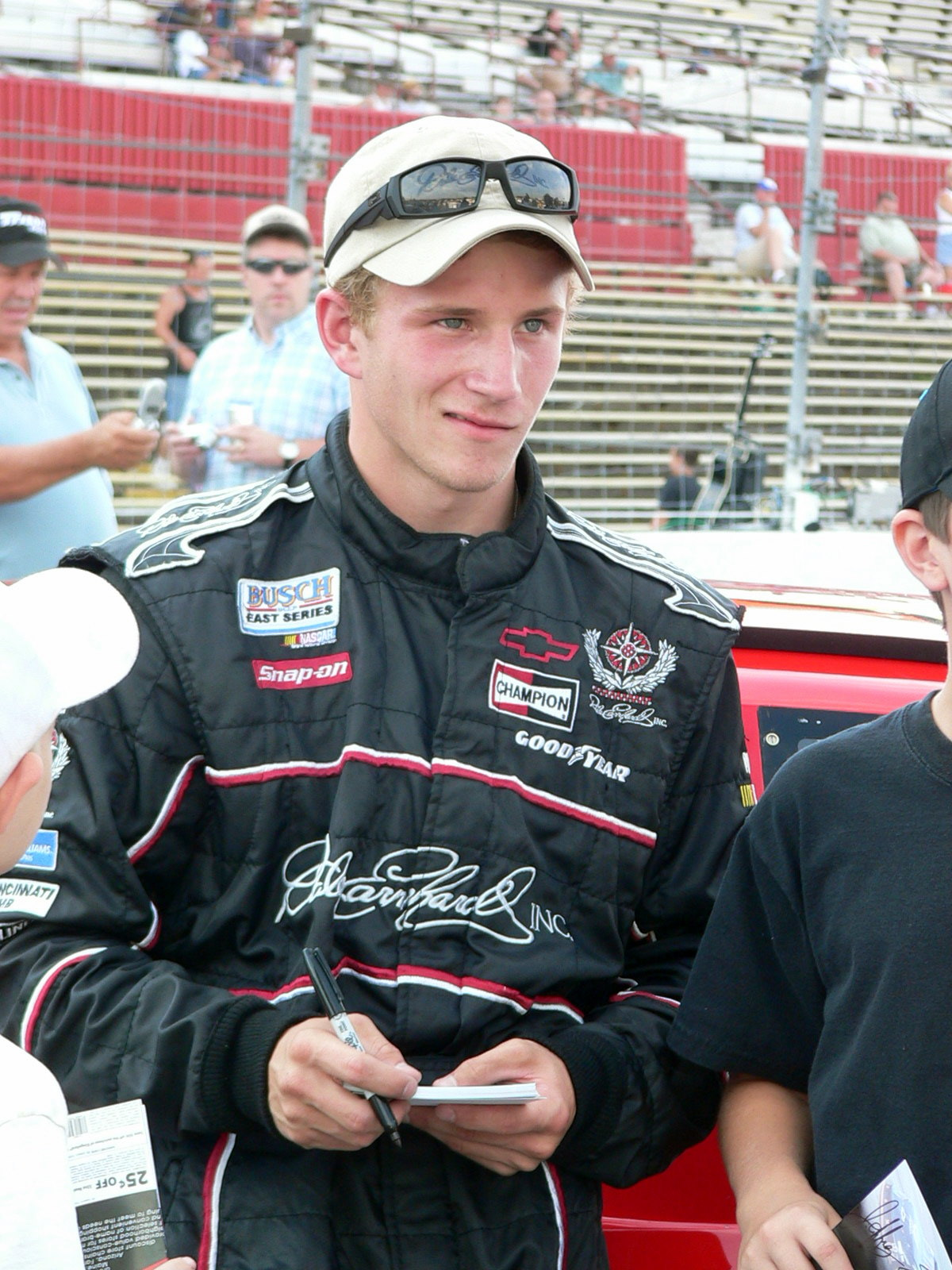
Earnhardt in 2007 at the East Series race at Music City Motorplex

Earnhardt's first race came in the hornet division at Wythe Raceway in Rural Retreat, Virginia. He scored three feature wins and finished in the top-five in division points, winning Rookie of the Year. The following year, he moved up to the sportsman division at the Motor Mile Speedway in Fairlawn, Virginia, finishing the season in the top-ten of the division standings. He competed in the late model season finale at the track as a teammate to RCR developmental driver Allison Duncan.

In 2006, General Motors created a driver developmental search program wherein they looked for individuals they believed to be the stars of the future and invited them to test a late model and a Busch car at two different tracks with the best moving on. Earnhardt made the final cut. In 2007, Earnhardt drove the No. 1 Chevrolet for Andy Santerre Motorsports in the NASCAR Busch East Series. He finished fifth in the 2007 Busch East point standings and won the Most Popular Driver Award at the end of the season.

In 2008, Earnhardt returned to what is now known as the ARCA Menards Series East for another full season. Earnhardt was unexpectedly replaced in the car at Dover in September 2008 with Aric Almirola who won the race. When DEI subsequently merged with Chip Ganassi Racing, their driver development program went into limbo, and Earnhardt was released.

In 2010, Earnhardt drove several races with Rick Ware Racing which qualified him to drive on all NASCAR tracks in the 2011 season. He signed with RWR to drive a full season in 2011 and make his run for rookie of the year in the NASCAR Camping World Truck Series. However, he was originally released from the team after offering his driving services to other truck teams. Earnhardt and Ware later reconciled, citing a lack of communication from both parties. RWR ran Earnhardt in the 24 Hours of Daytona where they finished twelfth.

Earnhardt moved to the Grand-Am Rolex Sports Car Series in 2012, where he raced in the GT class for Rick Ware Racing.

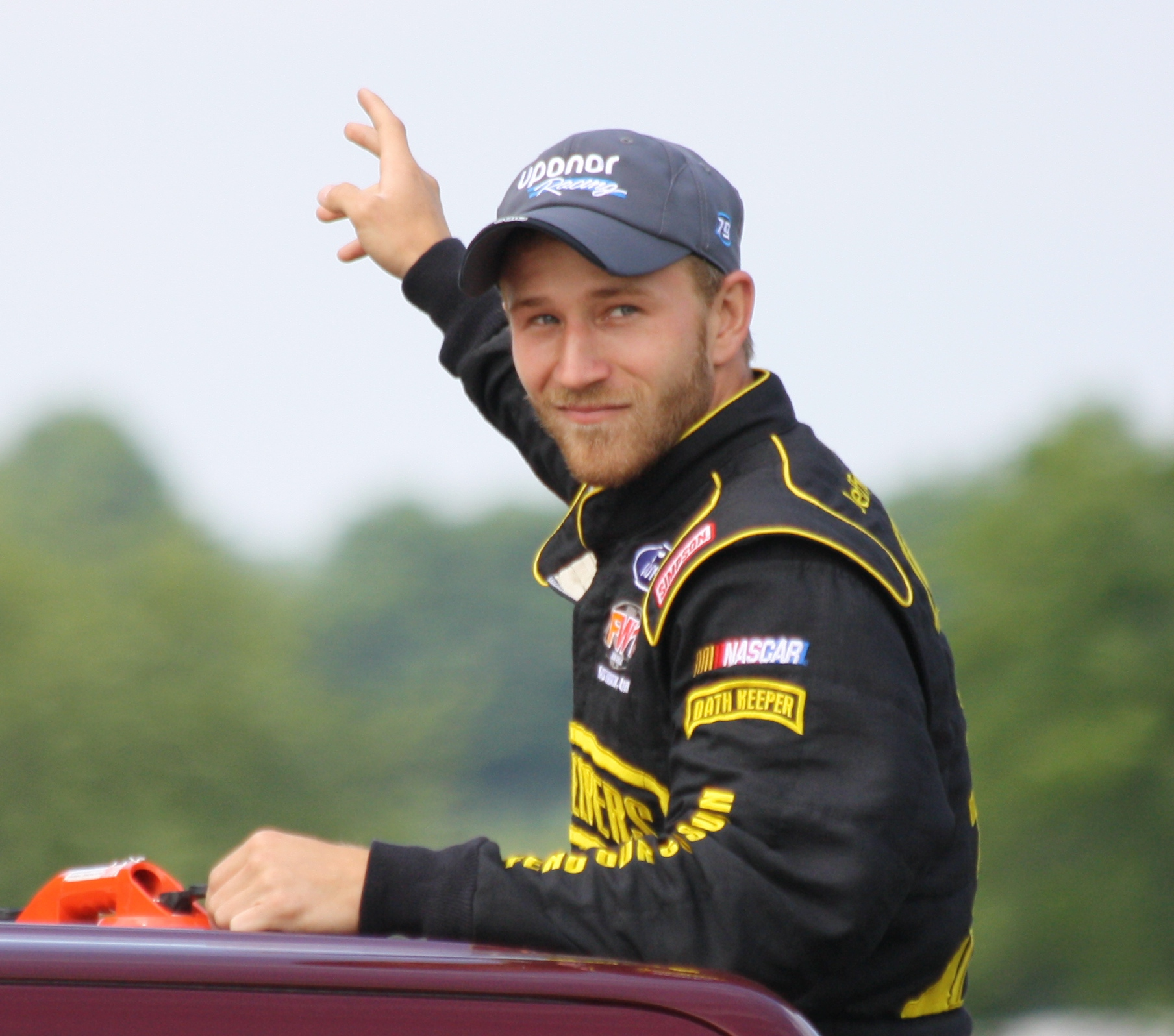
Earnhardt in 2013 at Road America

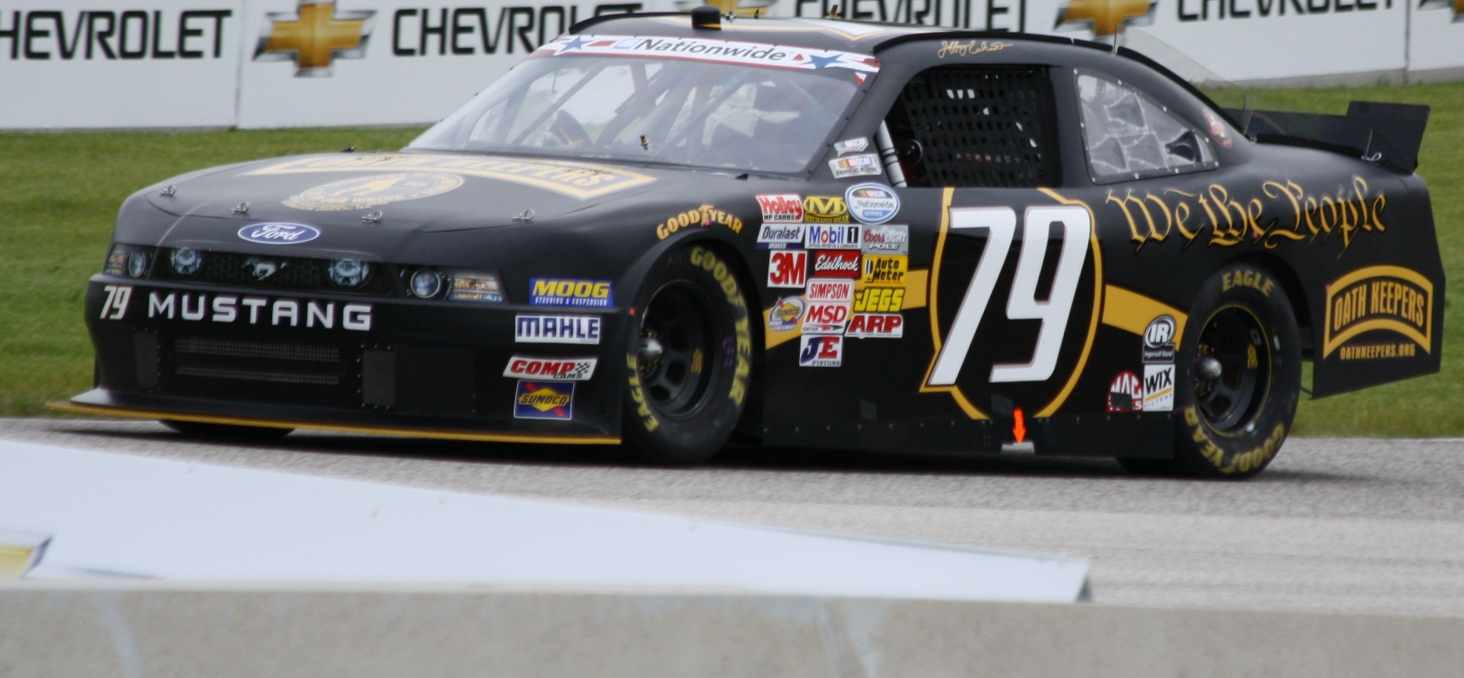
Earnhardt's 2013 Nationwide Series car for Go Green Racing

In November 2012, Earnhardt announced he would be competing for rookie of the year in the NASCAR Nationwide Series in 2013, driving the No. 79 for Go Green Racing; sponsorship issues later limited his schedule with the team.

On April 4, 2013, it was announced that Earnhardt would drive the No. 5 Chevrolet Camaro for JR Motorsports in a one-race agreement for the Nationwide race at Richmond International Raceway.

In the 2013 Charlotte testing for Sprint Cup cars, Earnhardt tested a car for Go Green Racing.

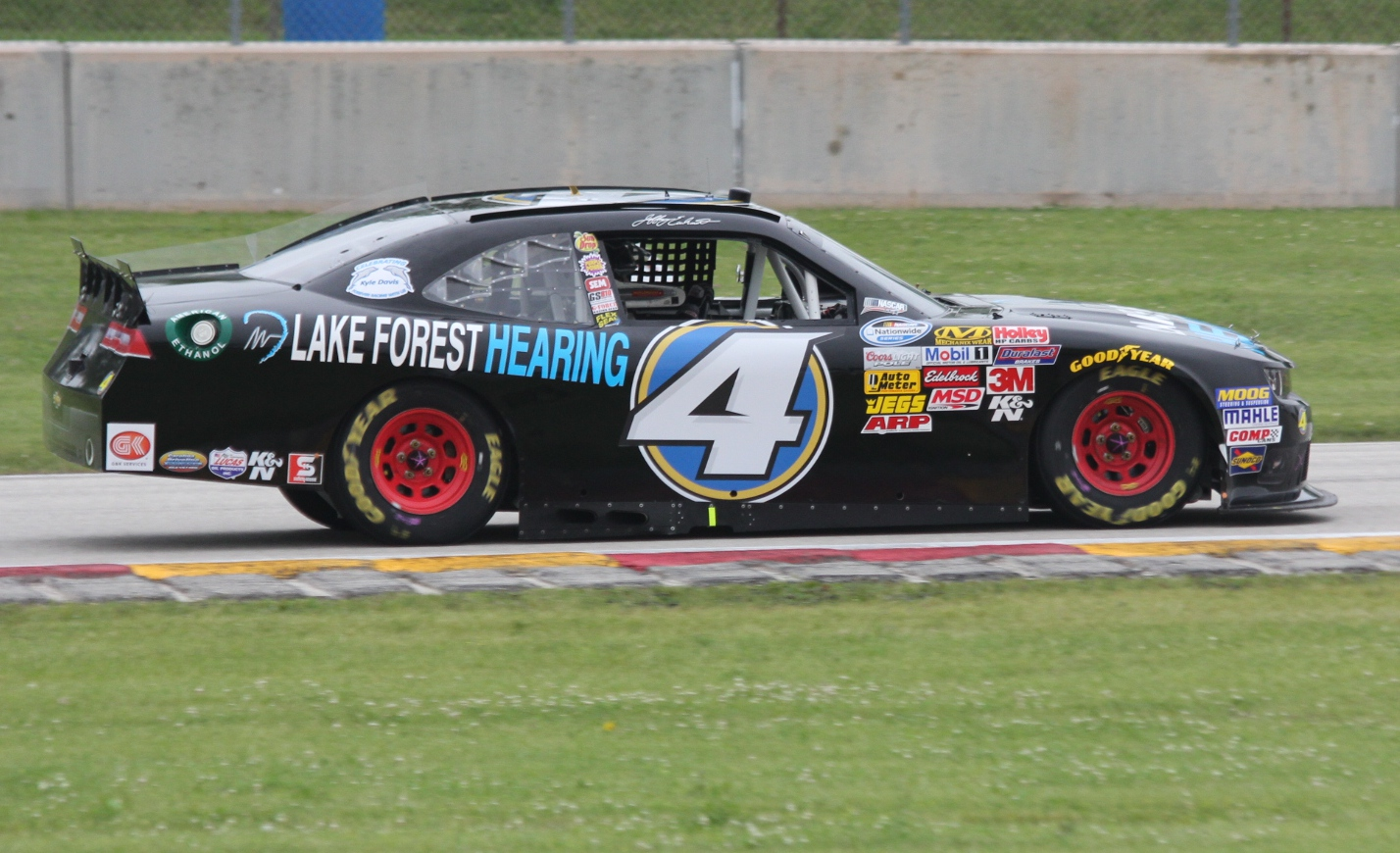
Earnhardt's 2014 Nationwide Series car for JD Motorsports

For 2014, Earnhardt moved full-time to the Nationwide Series, driving the No. 4 Chevrolet for JD Motorsports. During the Subway Firecracker 250 at Daytona, he was replaced by Matt DiBenedetto during the first caution period, since Earnhardt had suffered a fractured collarbone in a motorcycle accident during the week. His car was sponsored by The Great Outdoors RV Superstore for the Nationwide series Zippo 200 race at Watkins Glen International where he finished 21st. He would then finish eighteenth in the point standings and was also released by JD Motorsports after his disappointing season.

Before the 2015 season started, Earnhardt was picked up by Viva Motorsports to drive the season opener at Daytona. He finished fifteenth in the Daytona race.

Earnhardt made his Sprint Cup Series debut at the 2015 Federated Auto Parts 400 at Richmond International Raceway for Go Fas Racing. When he started this race, he became the second fourth-generation driver to compete in NASCAR's top series, with Adam Petty being the first.

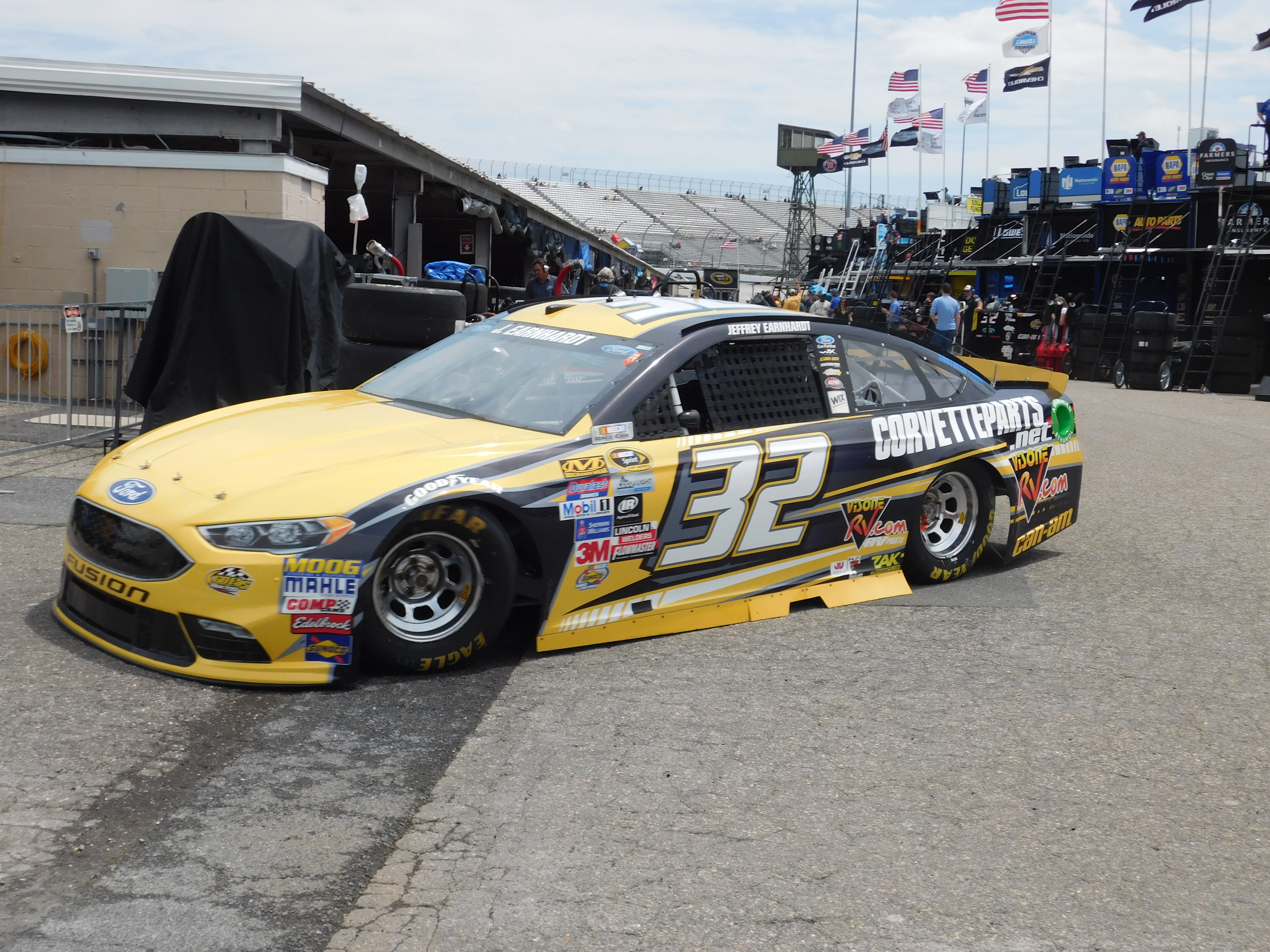
Earnhardt's 2016 Cup car for Go FAS Racing

After his prior success in racing Can-am and Cyclops created a partnership with Earnhardt and on September 18, Go Fas Racing announced that Earnhardt would run the majority of the 2016 Sprint Cup Series season, except for restrictor plate races that Bobby Labonte ran and road course races that Boris Said entered, with sponsorship from Can-Am motorcycles. He competed for Cup Rookie of the Year honors. Earnhardt joined BK Racing for the Hellmann's 500 at Talladega Superspeedway, driving the No. 83. He returned to BK for the AAA Texas 500, driving the No. 83 in place of an injured Matt DiBenedetto. Earnhardt then made his final start with BK Racing at Homestead, finishing 31st.

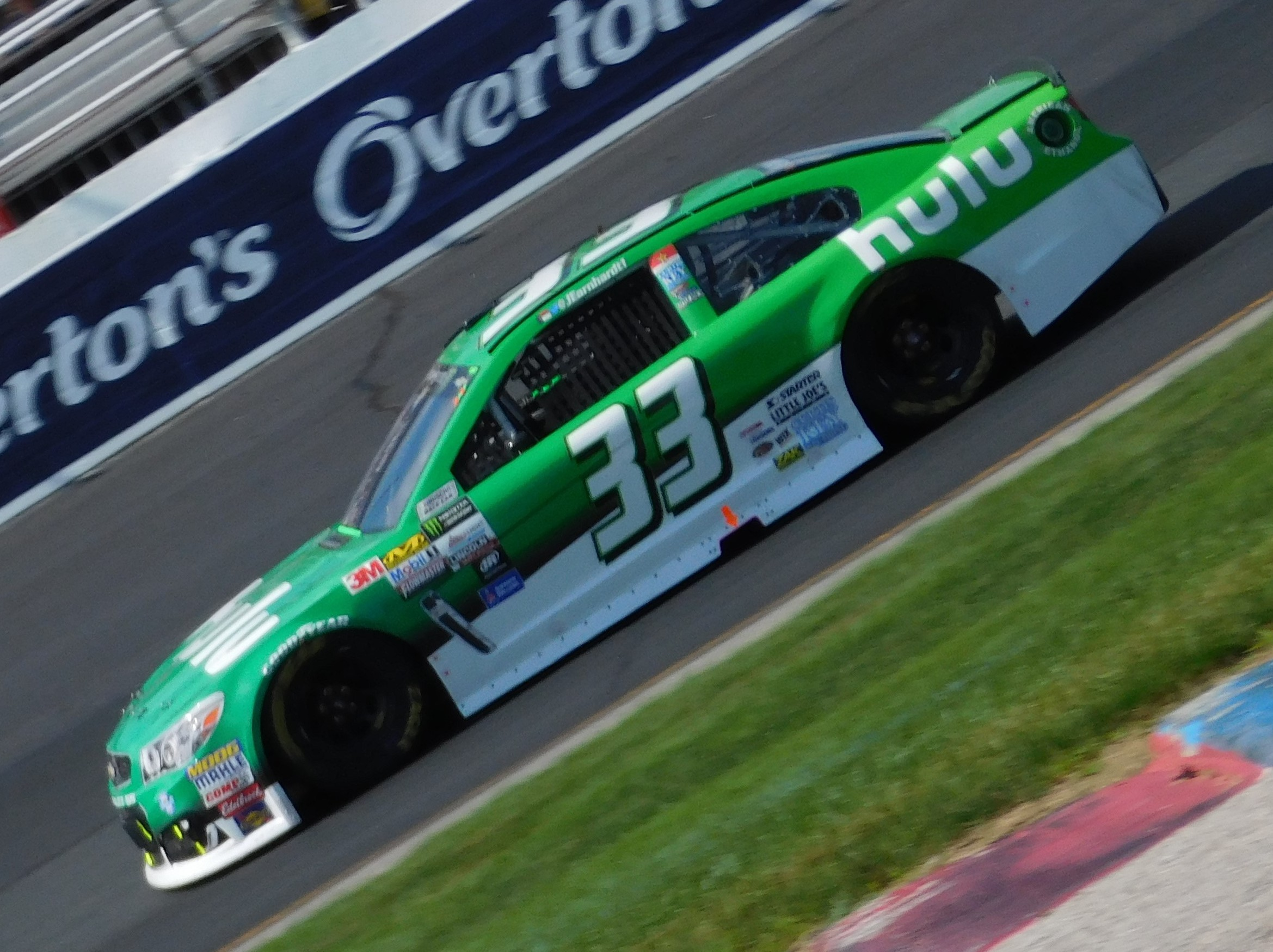
Earnhardt drove the No. 33 for Circle Sport – The Motorsports Group with Hulu sponsorship in 2017

After the 2016 season ended, Go Fas Racing announced that Earnhardt would not return to the No. 32 team for 2017, and was replaced by Matt DiBenedetto. In January 2017, Earnhardt announced that he would drive the No. 33 Chevrolet for Circle Sport – The Motorsports Group. The following month, Earnhardt made his CS–TMG debut at the Daytona 500, and in his debut with the team, Earnhardt made NASCAR history by becoming the first-ever fourth-generation driver to compete in the Daytona 500. He started 33rd and finished 26th (which tied his career-best finish up to that point) after being involved in a crash on lap 143. Earnhardt raced the full season except for the road courses. Starter sponsored the early part of the season, while Hulu stepped in to sponsor the majority.

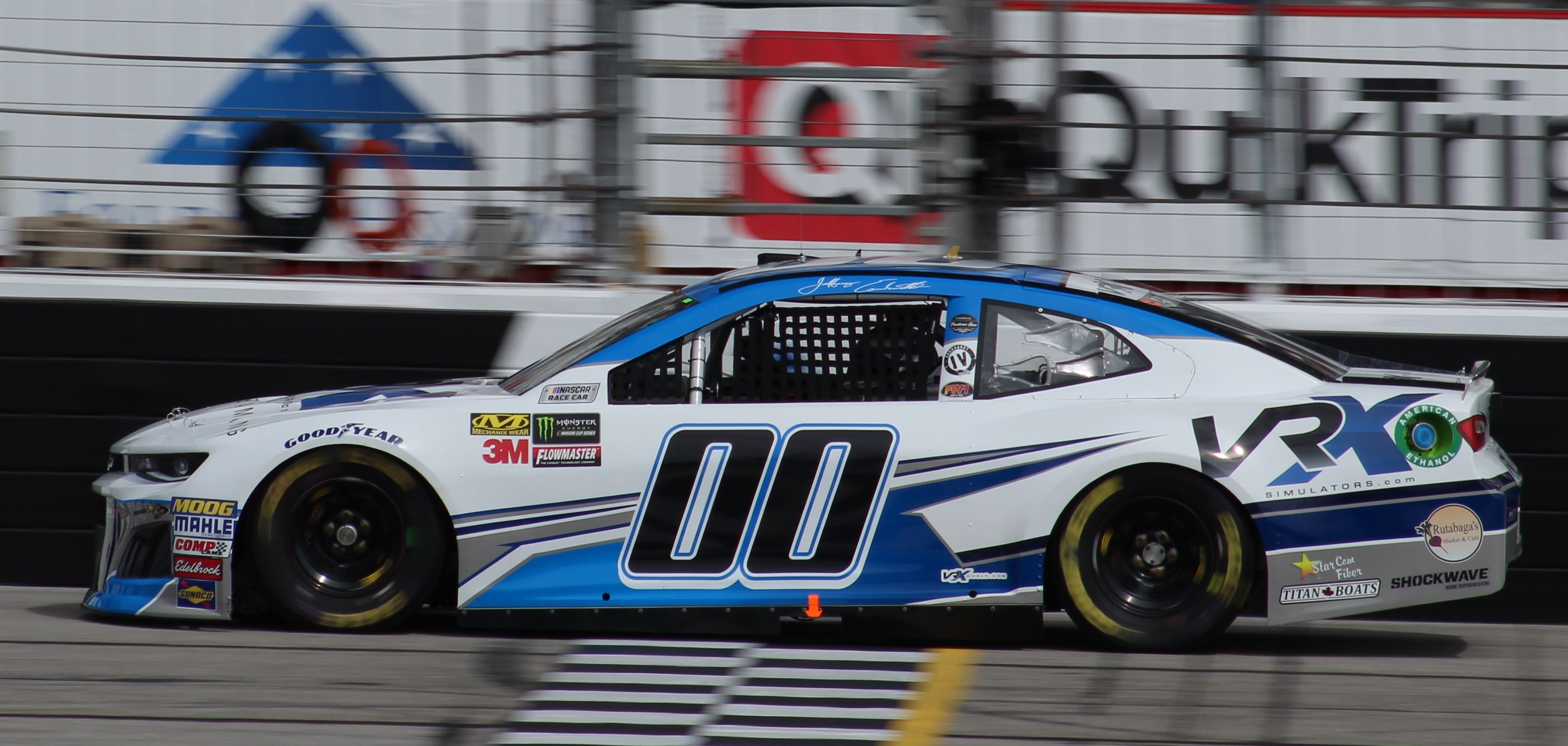
Earnhardt in the No. 00 for StarCom Racing in early 2018

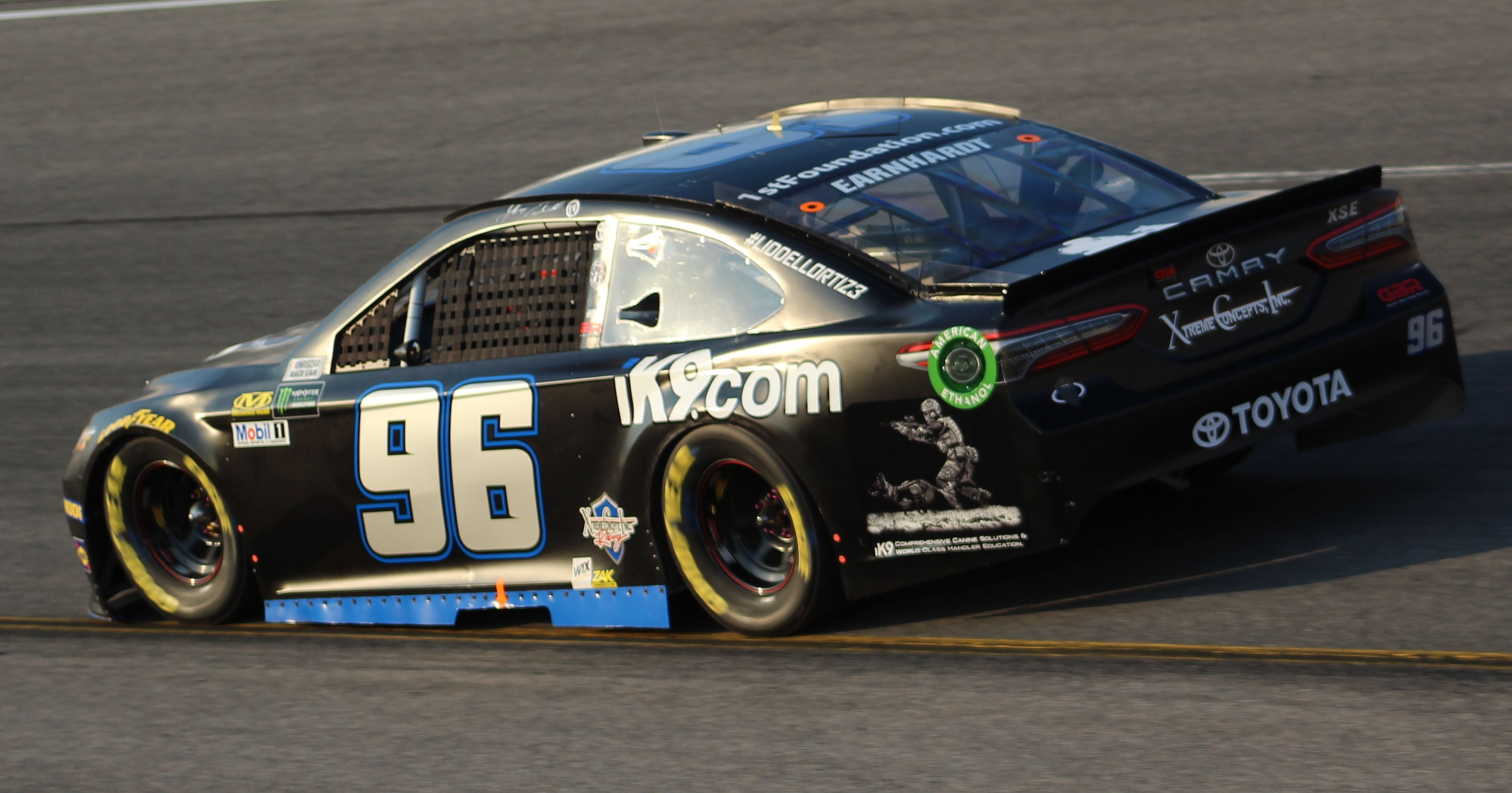
Earnhardt in the No. 96 for Gaunt Brothers Racing in late 2018

On October 15, 2017, Earnhardt signed a contract extension to remain with CS–TMG for the 2018 season. However, on December 12, Circle Sport Racing and The Motorsports Group ended their partnership, leaving Earnhardt temporarily without a ride. Earnhardt ended up joining the No. 00 StarCom Racing team for the 2018 Daytona 500, marking the fortieth consecutive year that a member of the Earnhardt family had driven in the event. Earnhardt also ran the next four races for StarCom and planned to run the full season for the team, but after the fifth race of the season, he and the team parted ways. On May 22, it was announced that Earnhardt would drive the No. 55 for Premium Motorsports in Charlotte's Coca-Cola 600. The week following the race, he announced more races with the team but did not name an exact number. On July 7, Earnhardt finished 11th at the Coke Zero Sugar 400, which was his career best Cup Series finish up to that point. On July 28, 2018, it was announced that Earnhardt would join Gaunt Brothers Racing in their No. 96 Toyota for 14 races, with sponsorship from Xtreme Concepts.

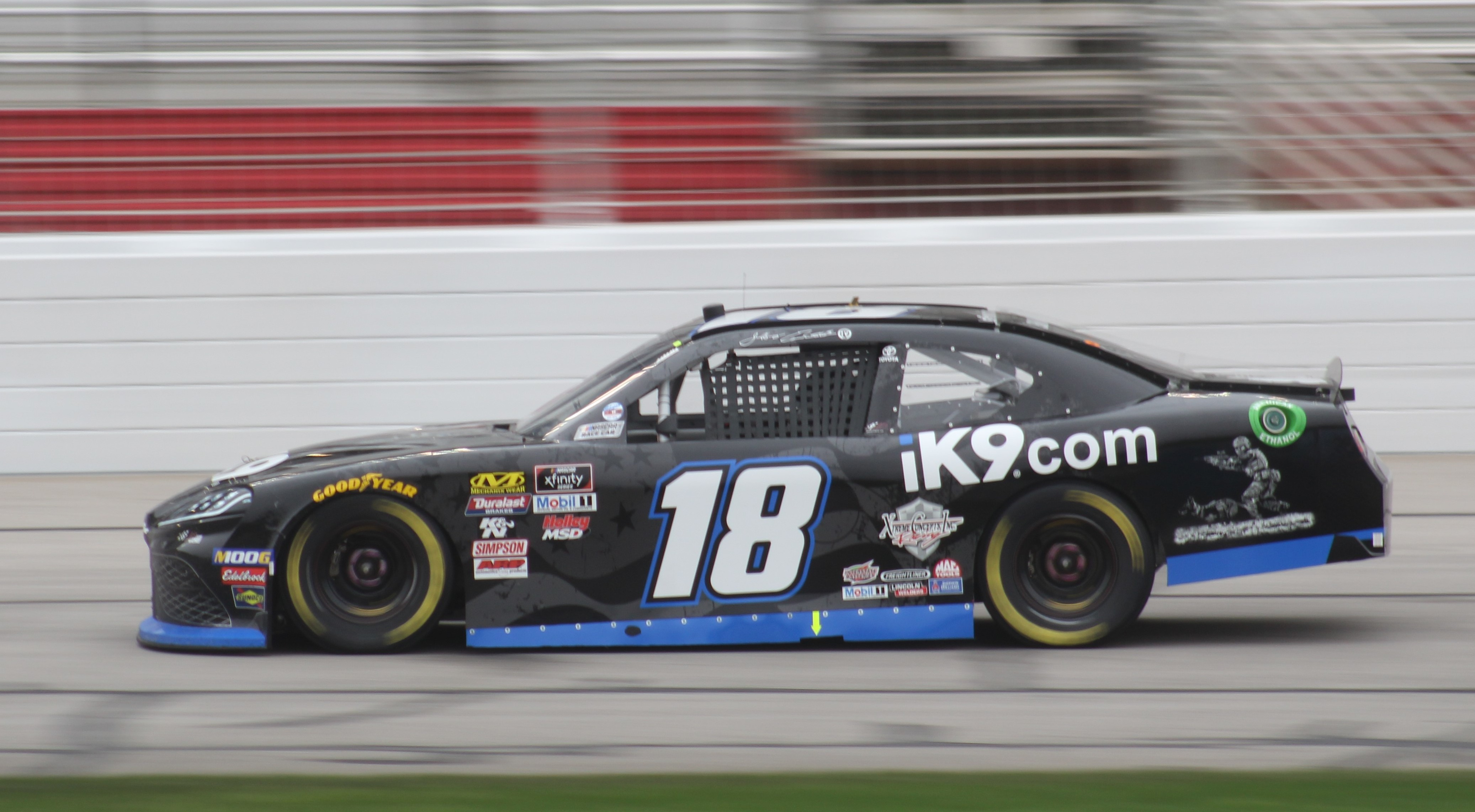
Earnhardt in the No. 18 for Joe Gibbs Racing

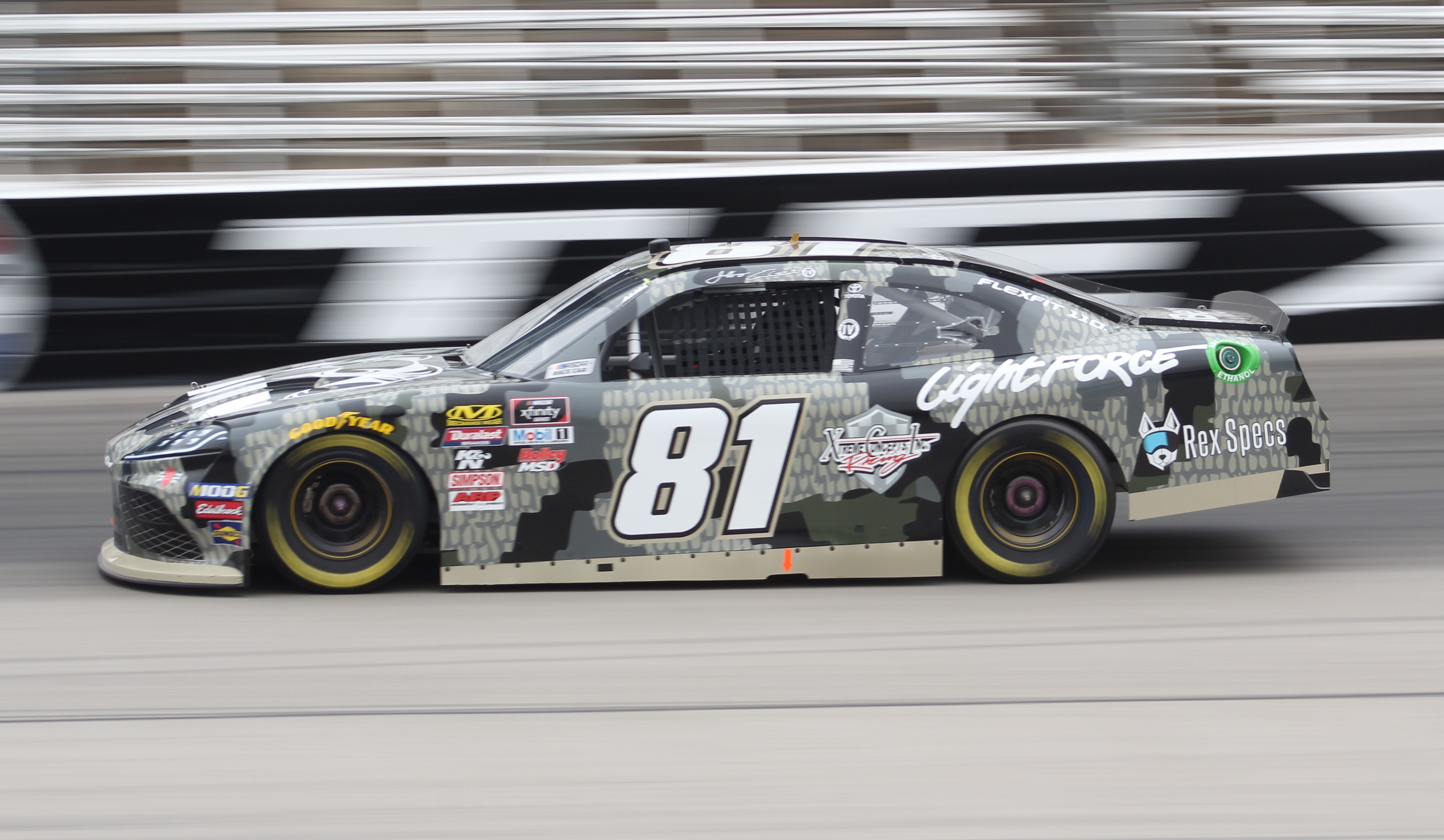
Earnhardt in the No. 81 for XCI Racing

In November 2018, Earnhardt joined Joe Gibbs Racing's for the 2019 NASCAR Xfinity Series season, driving the No. 18 Toyota Supra in nine races and sharing the ride with Riley Herbst, Kyle Busch, and Denny Hamlin. At the summer Charlotte race, Earnhardt scored a career-best third place finish, despite sustaining damage from hitting the turn 3 wall on lap 142.

On February 14, 2019, security company and sponsor Xtreme Concepts announced the formation of XCI Racing, which would field the No. 81 Toyota Camry and Supra for Earnhardt at the two Talladega Cup and five Xfinity races, respectively. Although Earnhardt stated that he would like to build with XCI to a full season in NASCAR's premier series in 2020, the team withdrew from the 2019 Circle K Firecracker 250 before Earnhardt announced his departure from XCI and JGR on August 7.

Earnhardt returned to JD Motorsports in 2020 on a twelve-race schedule. After running 29 races during the 2020 season, he was elevated to a full-time schedule with the team in 2021 in the No. 0.

On November 9, 2021, Earnhardt announced that he would not return to JD Motorsports in 2022 in order to pursue opportunities to drive for a top-tier team whether it be full-time or part-time. On January 14, 2022, it was announced that Earnhardt would drive part-time for Sam Hunt Racing in 2022. He would drive both of the team's cars, the part-time No. 24 and the full-time No. 26. Earnhardt's sponsor for most of the races in 2021, ForeverLawn, also moved with him from JDM to Sam Hunt Racing. Earnhardt would also drive the No. 35 car for Emerling-Gase Motorsports in the spring race at Phoenix. and the No. 3 car for Richard Childress Racing in the spring race at Talladega. It was the first time that Earnhardt drove the No. 3, the number made famous by his grandfather Dale when he drove for RCR in the Cup Series, in NASCAR and the first time he drove for RCR in NASCAR. He collected his first career pole award, and finished the race in a career-best second place behind Noah Gragson.

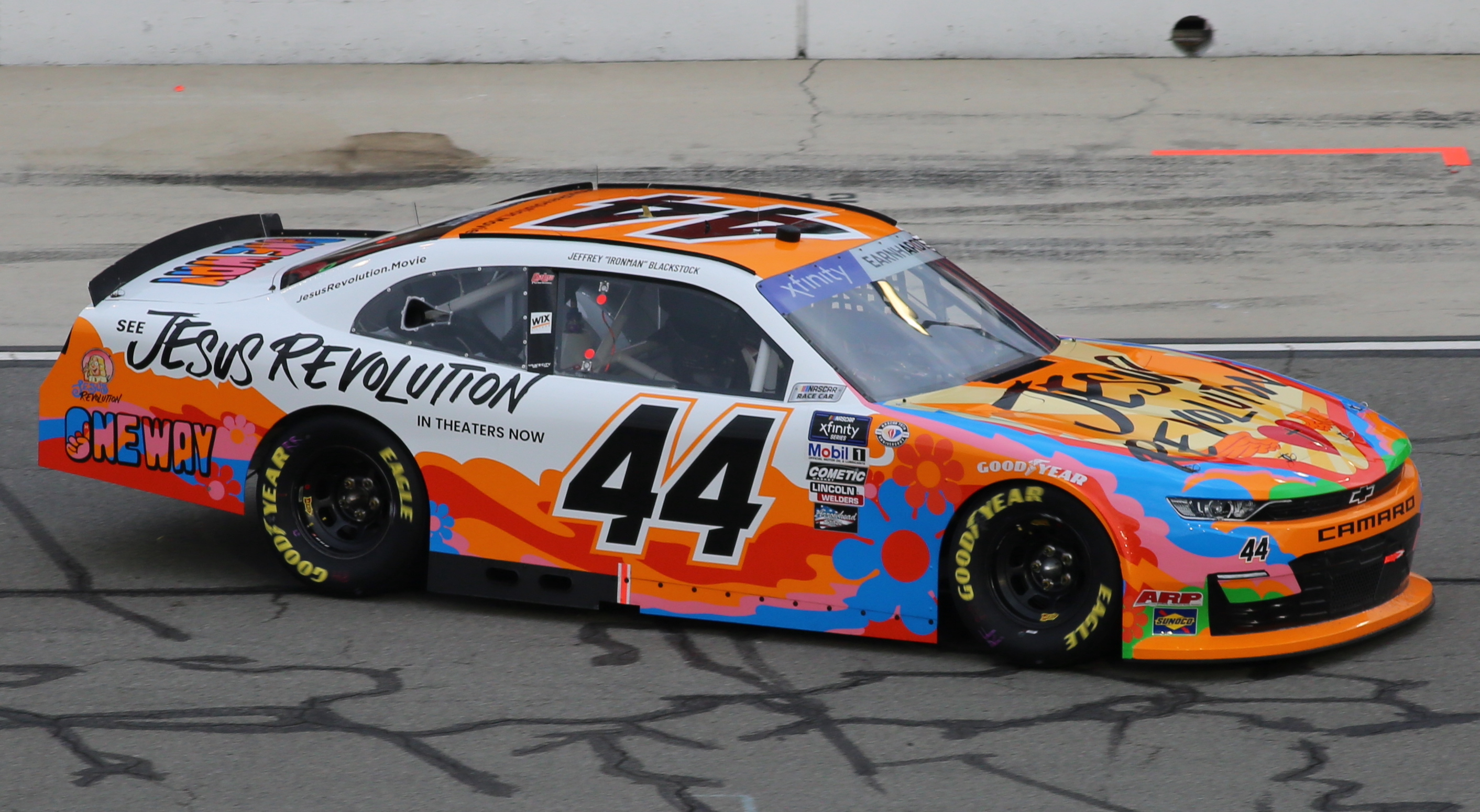
Earnhardt at Auto Club Speedway in 2023

In 2023, it was announced that Earnhardt would run full-time for Alpha Prime Racing in the No. 44 Chevrolet. However after the July race at Atlanta, he would run select races for the team, splitting between the No. 44 and No. 45, and finished 27th in the final points standings with a best finish of eleventh at Daytona in September of that year.

== MMA career ==
Earnhardt made his amateur debut in mixed martial arts on May 22, 2012, defeating Chris Faison by unanimous decision in Charlotte, North Carolina.

== Personal life and family ==
Earnhardt is a fourth-generation NASCAR driver. He is the middle child of Kerry Earnhardt, nephew of Dale Earnhardt Jr., grandson of NASCAR Hall of Fame driver Dale Earnhardt, and great-grandson of Ralph Earnhardt. He has four siblings: a paternal half-sister, Kayla, and two maternal half-brothers, James and David. His older brother, Bobby Dale Earnhardt, retired in 2019 from the ARCA Racing Series before coming back for the 2025 season.

== Motorsports career results ==
=== Racing career summary ===
Season	Series	Team	Races	Wins	Top 5	Top 10	Points	Position
2007	NASCAR Busch East Series	Dale Earnhardt, Inc.	13	0	4	6	1736	5th
2008	NASCAR Camping World East Series	Dale Earnhardt, Inc.	11	0	4	6	1416	15th
2009	NASCAR Camping World East Series	Dave Davis	1	0	1	1	165	49th
2009	NASCAR Nationwide Series	Rick Ware Racing	0	0	0	0	161	100th
2009	NASCAR Nationwide Series	Key Motorsports	2	0	0	0	161	100th
2010	NASCAR Camping World Truck Series	Rick Ware Racing	5	0	0	0	413	54th
2011	NASCAR Camping World Truck Series	Rick Ware Racing	5	0	0	1	106	38th
2011	NASCAR Nationwide Series	Rick Ware Racing	2	0	0	0	0	NC†
2011	Rolex Sports Car Series - GT	Rick Ware Racing	1	0	0	0	?	?
2011	24 Hours of Daytona	Rick Ware Racing	1	0	0	0	N/A	11th
2012	NASCAR Nationwide Series	Go Green Racing	1	0	0	0	112	43rd
2012	NASCAR Nationwide Series	Randy Hill Racing	1	0	0	0	112	43rd
2012	NASCAR Nationwide Series	Rick Ware Racing	4	0	0	0	112	43rd
2012	Rolex Sports Car Series - GT	Rick Ware Racing	1	0	0	0	?	?
2012	24 Hours of Daytona	Rick Ware Racing	1	0	0	0	N/A	38th
2013	NASCAR Nationwide Series	Go Green Racing	16	0	0	0	339	27th
2013	NASCAR Nationwide Series	JR Motorsports	1	0	0	0	339	27th
2014	NASCAR Nationwide Series	JD Motorsports	33	0	0	0	586	18th
2015	NASCAR Whelen Euro Series - Elite 1	Amai.fr	2	0	0	1	61	34th
2015	NASCAR Xfinity Series	Viva Motorsports	6	0	0	0	128	35th
2015	NASCAR Sprint Cup Series	Go Fas Racing	2	0	0	0	0	NC†
2016	NASCAR Pinty's Series	Dave Jacombs	1	0	0	1	37	45th
2016	NASCAR Sprint Cup Series	Go Fas Racing	19	0	0	0	159	41st
2016	NASCAR Sprint Cup Series	BK Racing	3	0	0	0	159	41st
2017	Monster Energy NASCAR Cup Series	Circle Sport - The Motorsports Group	34	0	0	0	128	36th
2018	Monster Energy NASCAR Cup Series	StarCom Racing	5	0	0	0	110	37th
2018	Monster Energy NASCAR Cup Series	Premium Motorsports	2	0	0	0	110	37th
2018	Monster Energy NASCAR Cup Series	Gaunt Brothers Racing	10	0	0	0	110	37th
2019	NASCAR Xfinity Series	Joe Gibbs Racing	5	0	1	2	187	31st
2019	NASCAR Xfinity Series	XCI Racing	2	0	0	1	187	31st
2019	Monster Energy NASCAR Cup Series	XCI Racing	1	0	0	0	0	NC†
2020	NASCAR Xfinity Series	JD Motorsports	29	0	0	0	417	23rd
2021	NASCAR Xfinity Series	JD Motorsports	29	0	0	0	325	26th
2022	NASCAR Xfinity Series	Sam Hunt Racing	9	0	0	1	200	31st
2022	NASCAR Xfinity Series	Emerling-Gase Motorsports	3	0	0	0	200	31st
2022	NASCAR Xfinity Series	Richard Childress Racing	1	0	1	1	200	31st
2023	NASCAR Xfinity Series	Alpha Prime Racing	24	0	0	0	272	27th
2024	NASCAR Craftsman Truck Series	MBM Motorsports	1	0	0	0	2	75th
2024	NASCAR Xfinity Series	Sam Hunt Racing	6	0	0	1	0	NC†
2025	NASCAR Xfinity Series	Sam Hunt Racing	3	0	0	0	33	50th

^{†} As Earnhardt was a guest driver, he was ineligible for championship points.

=== NASCAR ===
(key) (Bold – Pole position awarded by qualifying time. Italics – Pole position earned by points standings or practice time. * – Most laps led.)

==== Monster Energy Cup Series ====
Monster Energy NASCAR Cup Series results
Year	Team	No.	Make	1	2	3	4	5	6	7	8	9	10	11	12	13	14	15	16	17	18	19	20	21	22	23	24	25	26	27	28	29	30	31	32	33	34	35	36	MENCC	Pts	Ref
2015	Go Fas Racing	32	Ford	DAY	ATL	LVS	PHO	CAL	MAR	TEX	BRI	RCH	TAL	KAN	CLT	DOV	POC	MCH	SON	DAY	KEN	NHA	IND	POC	GLN	MCH	BRI	DAR	RCH; 40	CHI	NHA; 35	DOV	CLT	KAN	TAL	MAR	TEX	PHO	HOM	70th	0^{1}	
2016	Go Fas Racing	32	Ford	DAY	ATL; 38	LVS; 33	PHO	CAL; 34	MAR	TEX; 35	BRI; 32	RCH; 38	TAL	KAN	DOV; 35	CLT; 39	POC	MCH; 37	SON	DAY	KEN; 28	NHA	IND	POC	GLN	BRI; 29	MCH; 37	DAR; 38	RCH; 27	CHI	NHA; 37	DOV; 36	CLT; 26	KAN		MAR; 33		PHO; 33		41st	159	
2016	BK Racing	83	Toyota																																TAL; 34		TEX; 34		HOM; 31	41st	159	
2017	Circle Sport – The Motorsports Group	33	Chevy	DAY; 26	ATL; 33	LVS; 32	PHO; 39	CAL; 39	MAR; 36	TEX; 40	BRI; 27	RCH; 35	TAL; 28	KAN; 33	CLT; 40	DOV; 27	POC; 34	MCH; 35	SON	DAY; 37	KEN; 29	NHA; 33	IND; 26	POC; 36	GLN	MCH; 35	BRI; 40	DAR; 30	RCH; 34	CHI; 34	NHA; 38	DOV; 37	CLT; 30	TAL; 38	KAN; 26	MAR; 38	TEX; 33	PHO; 29	HOM; 32	36th	128	
2018	StarCom Racing	00	Chevy	DAY; 21	ATL; 34	LVS; 31	PHO; 35	CAL; 36	MAR	TEX	BRI	RCH	TAL	DOV	KAN																									37th	110	
2018	Premium Motorsports	55	Chevy													CLT; 30	POC	MCH	SON	CHI																				37th	110	
2018	Premium Motorsports	7	Chevy																		DAY; 11	KEN	NHA																	37th	110	
2018	Gaunt Brothers Racing	96	Toyota																					POC; 29	GLN	MCH; 39	BRI	DAR; 34	IND; 32	LVS; 25	RCH; 37	ROV; 26	DOV; 31	TAL; 37	KAN; 37	MAR	TEX	PHO	HOM	37th	110	
2019	XCI Racing	81	Toyota	DAY	ATL	LVS	PHO	CAL	MAR	TEX	BRI	RCH	TAL; 22	DOV	KAN	CLT	POC	MCH	SON	CHI	DAY	KEN	NHA	POC	GLN	MCH	BRI	DAR	IND	LVS	RCH	ROV	DOV	TAL	KAN	MAR	TEX	PHO	HOM	50th	0^{1}	

===== Daytona 500 =====
Year	Team	Manufacturer	Start	Finish
2017	Circle Sport – The Motorsports Group	Chevrolet	32	26
2018	StarCom Racing	Chevrolet	27	21

==== Xfinity Series ====
NASCAR Xfinity Series results
Year	Team	No.	Make	1	2	3	4	5	6	7	8	9	10	11	12	13	14	15	16	17	18	19	20	21	22	23	24	25	26	27	28	29	30	31	32	33	34	35	NXSC	Pts	Ref
2009	Rick Ware Racing	31	Chevy	DAY	CAL	LVS	BRI	TEX	NSH	PHO	TAL	RCH	DAR	CLT	DOV; DNQ	NSH	KEN	MLW	NHA	DAY	CHI	GTY	IRP	IOW															100th	161	
2009	Key Motorsports	40	Chevy																						GLN; 24	MCH	BRI	CGV; 31	ATL	RCH	DOV	KAN	CAL	CLT	MEM	TEX	PHO	HOM	100th	161	
2011	Rick Ware Racing	41	Chevy	DAY	PHO	LVS	BRI	CAL	TEX	TAL	NSH	RCH	DAR	DOV	IOW	CLT; 35	CHI	MCH	ROA	DAY; 19	KEN	NHA	NSH	IRP	IOW	GLN	CGV	BRI	ATL	RCH	CHI	DOV	KAN	CLT	TEX	PHO	HOM		120th^{1}	0^{1}	
2012	Rick Ware Racing	15	Ford	DAY	PHO	LVS	BRI; 26	CAL	TEX	RCH	TAL; 25	DAR	IOW	CLT	DOV	MCH	ROA	KEN	DAY; 30	NHA	CHI																		43rd	112	
2012	Rick Ware Racing	39	Chevy																			IND; 21	IOW	GLN	CGV	BRI	ATL	RCH	CHI	KEN	DOV								43rd	112	
2012	Go Green Racing	39	Ford																													CLT; 27	KAN	TEX	PHO				43rd	112	
2012	Randy Hill Racing	08	Ford																																	HOM; 23			43rd	112	
2013	Go Green Racing	79	Ford	DAY; 22	PHO; 20	LVS; 26	BRI; 32	CAL	TEX; 22		TAL; 16	DAR	CLT	DOV; 21	IOW	MCH; 31	ROA; 26	KEN	DAY; 33	NHA; 25	CHI	IND	IOW	GLN	MOH; 18	BRI	ATL	RCH; 28	CHI	KEN; 25	DOV	KAN	CLT; 30	TEX	PHO; 20	HOM			27th	339	
2013	JR Motorsports	5	Chevy							RCH; 17																													27th	339	
2014	JD Motorsports	4	Chevy	DAY; 30	PHO; 27	LVS; 33	BRI; 32	CAL; 23	TEX; 19	DAR; 20	RCH; 24	TAL; 16	IOW; 23	CLT; 25	DOV; 30	MCH; 25	ROA; 23	KEN; 23	DAY; 33	NHA; 23	CHI; 24	IND; 35	IOW; 31	GLN; 21	MOH; 28	BRI; 12	ATL; 25	RCH; 32	CHI; 30	KEN; 16	DOV; 20	KAN; 29	CLT; 40	TEX; 34	PHO; 40	HOM; 21			18th	586	
2015	Viva Motorsports	55	Chevy	DAY; 16	ATL; 32	LVS	PHO	CAL; 28	TEX	BRI; 15	RCH	TAL; 12	IOW	CLT	DOV	MCH; 34	CHI	DAY	KEN	NHA	IND	IOW	GLN	MOH	BRI	ROA	DAR	RCH	CHI	KEN	DOV	CLT	KAN	TEX	PHO	HOM			35th	128	
2019	Joe Gibbs Racing	18	Toyota	DAY; 15	ATL; 6	LVS	PHO	CAL				TAL; 26	DOV	CLT; 3	POC; 22	MCH	IOW																						31st	187	
2019	XCI Racing	81	Toyota						TEX; 8	BRI	RCH							CHI; 16	DAY	KEN	NHA	IOW	GLN	MOH	BRI	ROA	DAR	IND	LVS	RCH	ROV	DOV	KAN	TEX	PHO	HOM			31st	187	
2020	JD Motorsports	0	Chevy	DAY	LVS	CAL	PHO	DAR; 23	CLT; 25	BRI; 15	ATL; 21	HOM; 19	HOM; 16	TAL; 14	POC; 16		KEN; 29	KEN; 18	TEX; 12	KAN; 17			DOV; 20	DOV; 29	DAY; 33	DAR; 21	RCH; 24	RCH; 14	BRI; 17	LVS; 33	TAL; 32	ROV; 11	KAN; 20	TEX; 18	MAR; 28	PHO; 32			23rd	417	
2020	JD Motorsports	15	Chevy													IRC; 38					ROA; 31	DRC; 32																	23rd	417	
2021	JD Motorsports	0	Chevy	DAY; 37	DRC; 30	HOM; 22	LVS; 19	PHO; 19	ATL; 19	MAR; 36	TAL; 22	DAR; 31	DOV; 18	COA; DNQ	CLT; 22	MOH; 34	TEX; 36	NSH; DNQ	POC; 22	ROA; DNQ	ATL; 22	NHA; 26	GLN; 25	IRC	MCH; 23	DAY; 20	DAR; 26	RCH; 30	BRI; 25	LVS; 29	TAL; 29	ROV; 20	TEX; 23	KAN; 28	MAR; 22	PHO; 36			26th	325	
2022	Sam Hunt Racing	24	Toyota	DAY; 15																																			31st	200	
2022	Sam Hunt Racing	26	Toyota		CAL; 29	LVS		ATL; 13	COA	RCH	MAR				TEX; 19	CLT; 37	POR	NSH; 7	ROA	ATL; 19	NHA	POC	IRC	MCH	GLN	DAY	DAR	KAN	BRI; 12	TEX; 38									31st	200	
2022	Emerling-Gase Motorsports	35	Toyota				PHO; 34																										LVS; 27	HOM	MAR	PHO			31st	200	
2022	Richard Childress Racing	3	Chevy									**TAL**; 2	DOV	DAR																									31st	200	
2022	Emerling-Gase Motorsports	35	Ford																												TAL; 37	ROV							31st	200	
2023	Alpha Prime Racing	44	Chevy	DAY; 28	CAL; 26	LVS; 29	PHO; 33	ATL; 34		RCH; 18	MAR; 20	TAL; 31	DOV; 37																					HOM; 18					27th	272	
2023	Alpha Prime Racing	45	Chevy						COA; 25					DAR; 26	CLT; 21	PIR; 19	SON; 36	NSH; 27	CSC; DNQ	ATL; 23	NHA	POC; 19	ROA	MCH; 24	IRC	GLN	DAY; 11	DAR	KAN	BRI; 32	TEX; 32	ROV	LVS		MAR; 26	PHO; 23			27th	272	
2024	Sam Hunt Racing	26	Toyota	DAY	ATL; 8	LVS	PHO	COA	RCH	MAR	TEX	TAL; 37	DOV	DAR	CLT	PIR	SON	IOW	NHA	NSH	CSC	POC	IND	MCH; 21	DAY; 28	DAR	ATL	GLN	BRI; 35	KAN	TAL	ROV	LVS	HOM	MAR	PHO; 35			91st	0^{1}	
2025	Sam Hunt Racing	24	Toyota	DAY	ATL	COA	PHO	LVS	HOM	MAR	DAR	BRI	CAR	TAL; 32	TEX	CLT	NSH; 19	MXC	POC	ATL	CSC	SON	DOV	IND	IOW	GLN	DAY	PIR	GTW	BRI; 27	KAN	ROV	LVS	TAL	MAR	PHO			50th	33	

==== Craftsman Truck Series ====
NASCAR Craftsman Truck Series results
Year	Team	No.	Make	1	2	3	4	5	6	7	8	9	10	11	12	13	14	15	16	17	18	19	20	21	22	23	24	25	NCTC	Pts	Ref
2010	Rick Ware Racing	6	Chevy	DAY	ATL	MAR	NSH	KAN	DOV	CLT	TEX	MCH	IOW	GTY; 30	IRP	POC	NSH	DAR	BRI	CHI					TAL; 32	TEX	PHO		54th	413	
2010	Rick Ware Racing	47	Chevy																		KEN; 28	NHA	LVS; 18	MAR				HOM; 26	54th	413	
2011	Rick Ware Racing	1	Chevy	DAY; 7	PHO; 19	DAR; 20	MAR; 34	NSH	DOV	CLT	KAN	TEX	KEN	IOW	NSH	IRP	POC	MCH	BRI	ATL	CHI	NHA	KEN	LVS	TAL; 34	MAR	TEX	HOM	38th	106	
2024	MBM Motorsports	67	Toyota	DAY	ATL	LVS	BRI	COA	MAR	TEX	KAN	DAR	NWS	CLT; 35	GTW	NSH	POC	IRP	RCH	MLW	BRI	KAN	TAL	HOM	MAR	PHO			75th	2	

^{*} Season still in progress
^{1} Ineligible for series points

==== Pinty's Series ====
NASCAR Pinty's Series results
Year	Car owner	No.	Make	1	2	3	4	5	6	7	8	9	10	11	12	NPSC	Pts	Ref
2016	Dave Jacombs	36	Ford	MSP	SSS	ACD	ICAR	TOR	EIR	SAS	CTR; 7	RIS	MSP	ASE	KWA	45th	37	

==== Camping World East Series ====
NASCAR Camping World East Series results
Year	Team	No.	Make	1	2	3	4	5	6	7	8	9	10	11	12	13	NCWESC	Pts	Ref
2007	Dale Earnhardt, Inc.	1	Chevy	GRE; 6			SBO; 20	STA; 12	NHA; 15	TMP; 14	NSH; 4	ADI; 24	LRP; 5	MFD; 5	NHA; 11	**DOV**; 3	5th	1736	
2007	Dale Earnhardt, Inc.	11	Chevy		ELK; 16	IOW; 7											5th	1736	
2008	Dale Earnhardt, Inc.	8	Chevy	GRE; 23		SBO; 7	GLN; 2	NHA; 34	TMP; 5	NSH; 19	ADI; 4	LRP; 18	MFD; 10	NHA; 14	DOV	STA	15th	1416	
2008	Dale Earnhardt, Inc.	08	Chevy		IOW; 4												15th	1416	
2009	Dave Davis	03	Chevy	GRE	TRI	IOW; 3	SBO	GLN	NHA	TMP	ADI	LRP	NHA	DOV			49th	165	

==== Whelen Euro Series – Elite 1 ====
NASCAR Whelen Euro Series – Elite 1 results
Year	Team	No.	Make	1	2	3	4	5	6	7	8	9	10	11	12	NWES	Points	Ref
2015	Whelen – Amai.fr	55	Chevy	VAL	VAL	VEN	VEN	BRH; 20	BRH; 7	TOU	TOU	UMB	UMB	ZOL	ZOL	34th	61	

=== 24 Hours of Daytona ===
(key)

24 Hours of Daytona results
Year	Class	No	Team	Car	Co-drivers	Laps	Position	Class Pos.
2011	GT	47	(United States) Rick Ware Racing	Porsche GT3 Cup	(United States) Scott Monroe (United States) Doug Harrington (United States) Maurice Hull (United States) Brett Sandberg	635	25	11
2012	GT	15	(United States) Rick Ware Racing	Ford Mustang	(United States) Chris Cook (United States) Timmy Hill (United States) Doug Harrington (United States) John Ware	256	51 ^{DNF}	38 ^{DNF}
