= 2017 Apache Warrior 400 =

Race details
- Race 29 of 36 in the 2017 Monster Energy NASCAR Cup Series
- Date: October 1, 2017
- Location: Dover International Speedway in Dover, Delaware
- Course: Permanent racing facility
- Course length: 1 miles (1.6 km)
- Distance: 400 laps, 400 mi (640 km)
- Weather: Fair skies with a temperature of 68 °F (20 °C); wind out of the north at 8 mph (13 km/h)
- Average speed: 129.171 miles per hour (207.881 km/h)

Pole position
Driver	Martin Truex Jr.	Furniture Row Racing
- Time: 22.407

Most laps led
Driver	Chase Elliott	Hendrick Motorsports
- Laps: 138

Winner
No. 18	Kyle Busch	Joe Gibbs Racing

Television in the United States
- Network: NBCSN
- Announcers: Rick Allen, Jeff Burton and Steve Letarte

Radio in the United States
- Radio: MRN
- Booth announcers: Kurt Becker, Jeff Striegle and Rusty Wallace
- Turn announcers: Mike Bagley (Backstretch)

The 2017 Apache Warrior 400 presented by Lucas Oil was a Monster Energy NASCAR Cup Series race held on October 1, 2017, at Dover International Speedway in Dover, Delaware. Contested over 400 laps on the 1 mile (1.6 km) concrete speedway, it was the 29th race of the 2017 Monster Energy NASCAR Cup Series season, the third race of the Playoffs, and the final race of the Round of 16.

== Entry list ==
No.	Driver	Team	Manufacturer
1	Jamie McMurray	Chip Ganassi Racing	Chevrolet
2	Brad Keselowski	Team Penske	Ford
3	Austin Dillon	Richard Childress Racing	Chevrolet
4	Kevin Harvick	Stewart–Haas Racing	Ford
5	Kasey Kahne	Hendrick Motorsports	Chevrolet
6	Trevor Bayne	Roush Fenway Racing	Ford
10	Danica Patrick	Stewart–Haas Racing	Ford
11	Denny Hamlin	Joe Gibbs Racing	Toyota
13	Ty Dillon (R)	Germain Racing	Chevrolet
14	Clint Bowyer	Stewart–Haas Racing	Ford
15	Ross Chastain (i)	Premium Motorsports	Chevrolet
17	Ricky Stenhouse Jr.	Roush Fenway Racing	Ford
18	Kyle Busch	Joe Gibbs Racing	Toyota
19	Daniel Suárez (R)	Joe Gibbs Racing	Toyota
20	Matt Kenseth	Joe Gibbs Racing	Toyota
21	Ryan Blaney	Wood Brothers Racing	Ford
22	Joey Logano	Team Penske	Ford
23	Corey LaJoie (R)	BK Racing	Toyota
24	Chase Elliott	Hendrick Motorsports	Chevrolet
27	Paul Menard	Richard Childress Racing	Chevrolet
31	Ryan Newman	Richard Childress Racing	Chevrolet
32	Matt DiBenedetto	Go Fas Racing	Ford
33	Jeffrey Earnhardt	Circle Sport – The Motorsports Group	Chevrolet
34	Landon Cassill	Front Row Motorsports	Ford
37	Chris Buescher	JTG Daugherty Racing	Chevrolet
38	David Ragan	Front Row Motorsports	Ford
41	Kurt Busch	Stewart–Haas Racing	Ford
42	Kyle Larson	Chip Ganassi Racing	Chevrolet
43	Aric Almirola	Richard Petty Motorsports	Ford
47	A. J. Allmendinger	JTG Daugherty Racing	Chevrolet
48	Jimmie Johnson	Hendrick Motorsports	Chevrolet
51	B. J. McLeod (i)	Rick Ware Racing	Chevrolet
55	Reed Sorenson	Premium Motorsports	Toyota
66	Timmy Hill (i)	MBM Motorsports	Chevrolet
72	Cole Whitt	TriStar Motorsports	Chevrolet
77	Erik Jones (R)	Furniture Row Racing	Toyota
78	Martin Truex Jr.	Furniture Row Racing	Toyota
83	Brett Moffitt (i)	BK Racing	Toyota
88	Dale Earnhardt Jr.	Hendrick Motorsports	Chevrolet
95	Michael McDowell	Leavine Family Racing	Chevrolet
Official entry list

== Practice ==
=== First practice ===
Matt Kenseth was the fastest in the first practice session with a time of 22.147 seconds and a speed of 162.550 mph (261.599 km/h).

Pos	No.	Driver	Team	Manufacturer	Time	Speed
1	20	Matt Kenseth	Joe Gibbs Racing	Toyota	22.147	162.550
2	42	Kyle Larson	Chip Ganassi Racing	Chevrolet	22.219	162.023
3	48	Jimmie Johnson	Hendrick Motorsports	Chevrolet	22.219	162.023
Official first practice results

=== Second practice ===
Kevin Harvick was the fastest in the second practice session with a time of 22.998 seconds and a speed of 156.535 mph (251.919 km/h).

Pos	No.	Driver	Team	Manufacturer	Time	Speed
1	4	Kevin Harvick	Stewart–Haas Racing	Ford	22.998	156.535
2	88	Dale Earnhardt Jr.	Hendrick Motorsports	Chevrolet	23.016	156.413
3	41	Kurt Busch	Stewart–Haas Racing	Ford	23.025	156.352
Official second practice results

=== Final practice ===
Chase Elliott was the fastest in the final practice session with a time of 22.877 seconds and a speed of 157.363 mph (253.251 km/h).

Pos	No.	Driver	Team	Manufacturer	Time	Speed
1	24	Chase Elliott	Hendrick Motorsports	Chevrolet	22.877	157.363
2	48	Jimmie Johnson	Hendrick Motorsports	Chevrolet	22.944	156.904
3	4	Kevin Harvick	Stewart–Haas Racing	Ford	22.945	156.897
Official final practice results

== Qualifying ==
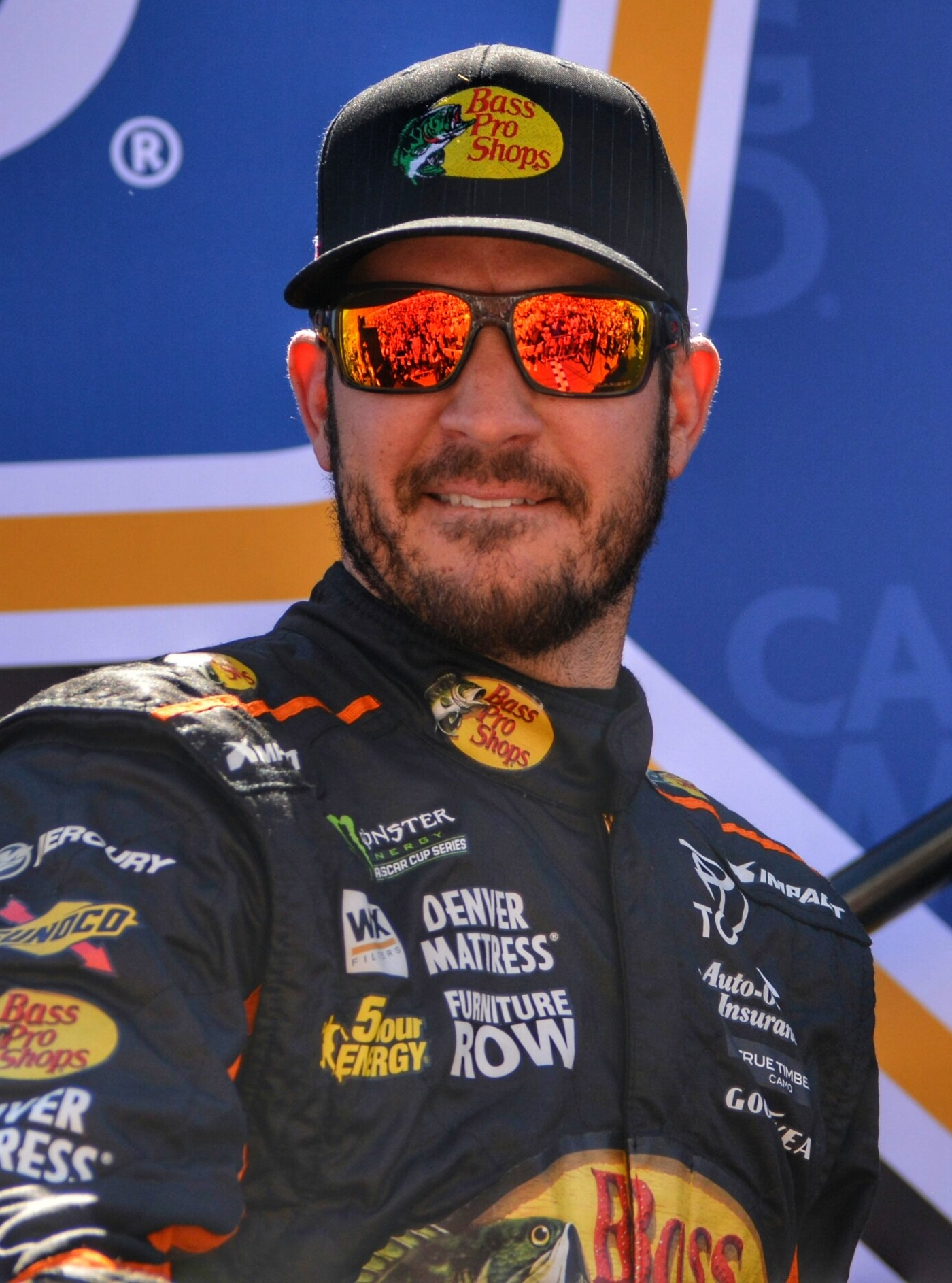
Martin Truex Jr. won the pole.

Martin Truex Jr. scored the pole for the race with a time of 22.407 and a speed of 160.664 mph (258.564 km/h).

=== Qualifying results ===
Pos	No.	Driver	Team	Manufacturer	R1	R2	R3
1	78	Martin Truex Jr.	Furniture Row Racing	Toyota	22.776	22.589	22.407
2	18	Kyle Busch	Joe Gibbs Racing	Toyota	22.552	22.388	22.445
3	42	Kyle Larson	Chip Ganassi Racing	Chevrolet	22.571	22.475	22.502
4	20	Matt Kenseth	Joe Gibbs Racing	Toyota	22.660	22.628	22.504
5	19	Daniel Suárez (R)	Joe Gibbs Racing	Toyota	22.739	22.546	22.515
6	11	Denny Hamlin	Joe Gibbs Racing	Toyota	22.603	22.611	22.534
7	88	Dale Earnhardt Jr.	Hendrick Motorsports	Chevrolet	22.853	22.467	22.544
8	31	Ryan Newman	Richard Childress Racing	Chevrolet	22.763	22.565	22.577
9	4	Kevin Harvick	Stewart–Haas Racing	Ford	22.661	22.624	22.612
10	77	Erik Jones (R)	Furniture Row Racing	Toyota	22.670	22.665	22.622
11	21	Ryan Blaney	Wood Brothers Racing	Ford	22.581	22.581	22.638
12	24	Chase Elliott	Hendrick Motorsports	Chevrolet	22.635	22.667	22.680
13	41	Kurt Busch	Stewart–Haas Racing	Ford	22.596	22.689	—
14	43	Aric Almirola	Richard Petty Motorsports	Ford	22.737	22.689	—
15	17	Ricky Stenhouse Jr.	Roush Fenway Racing	Ford	22.760	22.705	—
16	2	Brad Keselowski	Team Penske	Ford	22.727	22.713	—
17	48	Jimmie Johnson	Hendrick Motorsports	Chevrolet	22.723	22.726	—
18	22	Joey Logano	Team Penske	Ford	22.819	22.737	—
19	14	Clint Bowyer	Stewart–Haas Racing	Ford	22.673	22.754	—
20	6	Trevor Bayne	Roush Fenway Racing	Ford	22.802	22.811	—
21	5	Kasey Kahne	Hendrick Motorsports	Chevrolet	22.806	22.819	—
22	37	Chris Buescher	JTG Daugherty Racing	Chevrolet	22.794	22.826	—
23	3	Austin Dillon	Richard Childress Racing	Chevrolet	22.844	22.842	—
24	10	Danica Patrick	Stewart–Haas Racing	Ford	22.808	22.923	—
25	27	Paul Menard	Richard Childress Racing	Chevrolet	22.875	—	—
26	1	Jamie McMurray	Chip Ganassi Racing	Chevrolet	22.923	—	—
27	47	A. J. Allmendinger	JTG Daugherty Racing	Chevrolet	22.939	—	—
28	38	David Ragan	Front Row Motorsports	Ford	23.006	—	—
29	13	Ty Dillon (R)	Germain Racing	Chevrolet	23.038	—	—
30	95	Michael McDowell	Leavine Family Racing	Chevrolet	23.100	—	—
31	34	Landon Cassill	Front Row Motorsports	Ford	23.311	—	—
32	15	Ross Chastain (i)	Premium Motorsports	Chevrolet	23.506	—	—
33	72	Cole Whitt	TriStar Motorsports	Chevrolet	23.519	—	—
34	83	Brett Moffitt (i)	BK Racing	Toyota	23.544	—	—
35	66	Timmy Hill (i)	MBM Motorsports	Chevrolet	23.710	—	—
36	51	B. J. McLeod (i)	Rick Ware Racing	Chevrolet	24.107	—	—
37	23	Corey LaJoie (R)	BK Racing	Toyota	24.174	—	—
38	33	Jeffrey Earnhardt	Circle Sport – The Motorsports Group	Chevrolet	24.192	—	—
39	55	Reed Sorenson	Premium Motorsports	Toyota	191.747	—	—
40	32	Matt DiBenedetto	Go Fas Racing	Ford	0.000	—	—
Official qualifying results

== Race ==
=== First stage ===
Martin Truex Jr. led the field to the green flag and led the early part of the race. On lap 25, Kyle Larson took the lead from Truex. Larson would lead the race until Truex regained the lead on lap 60. On lap 82, a round of green-flag pit stops began. On lap 86, the first caution of the race came out during green-flag pit stops when Jeffrey Earnhardt spun coming into pit road and hit the barrels at the entrance to pit road. At the time of the caution, Kyle Busch was leading as he and a few other drivers had yet to pit including Brad Keselowski, Ricky Stenhouse Jr., Danica Patrick, and David Ragan. The race would be red-flagged for 15 minutes to replace the barrels at the entrance to pit road. The leaders pitted on lap 88 and Keselowski won the battle off pit road. The race returned to green flag on lap 93 and Keselowski would hold onto the lead to win Stage 1, which concluded on lap 120.

=== Second stage ===
After the first stage ended, the second caution of the race came out. The leaders pitted, and Kyle Busch left pit road first. Matt Kenseth was penalized for speeding on pit road. The race returned to green on lap 128 and Kyle Busch would continue to lead. On lap 151, Larson took the lead from Kyle Busch. On lap 167, the third caution of the race came out when Reed Sorenson blew an engine. Under this caution, the leaders pitted and Truex won the battle off pit road. The green flag came back out on lap 174 and Truex initially held the lead until getting passed by Larson in turn 2. On lap 219, Kevin Harvick made an unscheduled green-flag pit stop for a vibration. Larson held onto the lead and won Stage 2, which ended on lap 240.

=== Final stage ===
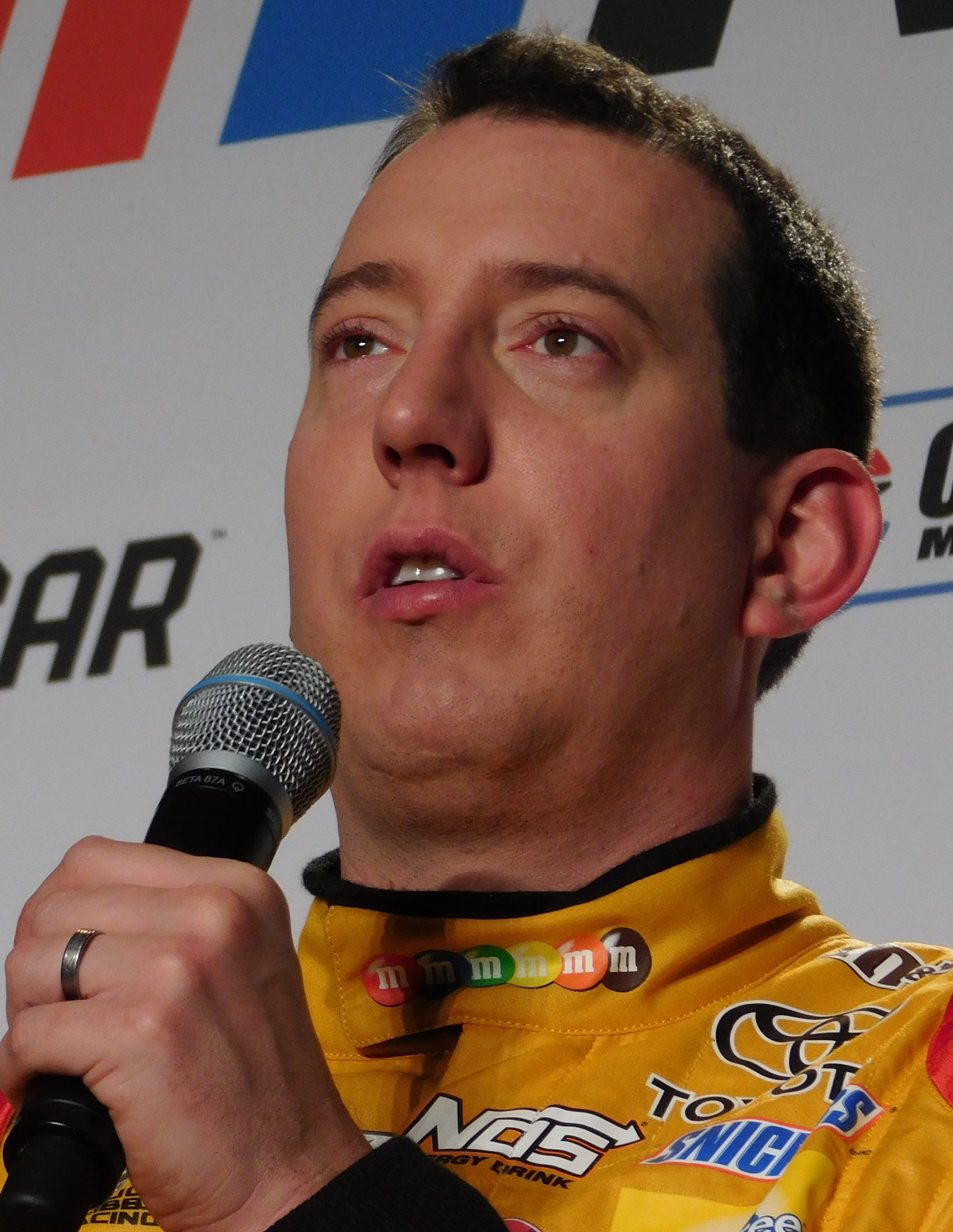
Kyle Busch won the race

Following the conclusion of the second stage, the fourth caution of the race came out. The leaders came to pit road under the caution and Larson maintained the lead. However, Larson could not maintain speed after having to shut off his engine and restart it, which dropped him back to fifth for the restart and gave Chase Elliott the lead. The green flag came back out on lap 249 and Elliott held onto the lead. Elliott's lead would continue to grow as the race remained green. On lap 319, a round of green-flag pit stops began. Race leader Elliott pitted on lap 325, giving the lead to Kyle Busch, he pitted 5 laps later and gave the lead to Jimmie Johnson. Under this round of pit stops, Kurt Busch had a commitment line violation. Johnson pitted from the lead on lap 334 and gave the lead to Keselowski. He, Austin Dillon. and Ricky Stenhouse Jr. pitted on lap 340 to complete the cycle of green-flag pit stops and give the lead back to Elliott. Elliott continued to hold onto the lead. On lap 373, Denny Hamlin hit the wall and slowed down on the track. He was able to make it to pit road with a broken axle with the race remaining green. In the closing laps, Kyle Busch started catching Elliott as Elliott was getting caught in lapped traffic. Coming to the white flag on lap 399, Kyle Busch took the lead from Elliott. Kyle Busch held onto the lead to win the race. Following the race, Ryan Newman, Austin Dillon, Kurt Busch, and Kasey Kahne were eliminated from the playoffs.

== Race results ==
=== Stage results ===
Stage 1 Laps: 120

Pos	No	Driver	Team	Manufacturer	Points
1	2	Brad Keselowski	Team Penske	Ford	10
2	18	Kyle Busch	Joe Gibbs Racing	Toyota	9
3	78	Martin Truex Jr.	Furniture Row Racing	Toyota	8
4	17	Ricky Stenhouse Jr.	Roush Fenway Racing	Ford	7
5	10	Danica Patrick	Stewart–Haas Racing	Ford	6
6	42	Kyle Larson	Chip Ganassi Racing	Chevrolet	5
7	24	Chase Elliott	Hendrick Motorsports	Chevrolet	4
8	4	Kevin Harvick	Stewart–Haas Racing	Ford	3
9	38	David Ragan	Front Row Motorsports	Ford	2
10	11	Denny Hamlin	Joe Gibbs Racing	Toyota	1
Official stage one results

Stage 2 Laps: 120

Pos	No	Driver	Team	Manufacturer	Points
1	42	Kyle Larson	Chip Ganassi Racing	Chevrolet	10
2	78	Martin Truex Jr.	Furniture Row Racing	Toyota	9
3	24	Chase Elliott	Hendrick Motorsports	Chevrolet	8
4	18	Kyle Busch	Joe Gibbs Racing	Toyota	7
5	48	Jimmie Johnson	Hendrick Motorsports	Chevrolet	6
6	11	Denny Hamlin	Joe Gibbs Racing	Toyota	5
7	88	Dale Earnhardt Jr.	Hendrick Motorsports	Chevrolet	4
8	2	Brad Keselowski	Team Penske	Ford	3
9	1	Jamie McMurray	Chip Ganassi Racing	Chevrolet	2
10	14	Clint Bowyer	Stewart–Haas Racing	Ford	1
Official stage two results

=== Final stage results ===
Stage 3 Laps: 160

Pos	Grid	No	Driver	Team	Manufacturer	Laps	Points
1	2	18	Kyle Busch	Joe Gibbs Racing	Toyota	400	56
2	12	24	Chase Elliott	Hendrick Motorsports	Chevrolet	400	47
3	17	48	Jimmie Johnson	Hendrick Motorsports	Chevrolet	400	40
4	1	78	Martin Truex Jr.	Furniture Row Racing	Toyota	400	50
5	3	42	Kyle Larson	Chip Ganassi Racing	Chevrolet	400	47
6	19	14	Clint Bowyer	Stewart–Haas Racing	Ford	400	32
7	7	88	Dale Earnhardt Jr.	Hendrick Motorsports	Chevrolet	400	34
8	5	19	Daniel Suárez (R)	Joe Gibbs Racing	Toyota	400	29
9	26	1	Jamie McMurray	Chip Ganassi Racing	Chevrolet	400	30
10	16	2	Brad Keselowski	Team Penske	Ford	400	40
11	4	20	Matt Kenseth	Joe Gibbs Racing	Toyota	400	26
12	10	77	Erik Jones (R)	Furniture Row Racing	Toyota	400	25
13	8	31	Ryan Newman	Richard Childress Racing	Chevrolet	399	24
14	21	5	Kasey Kahne	Hendrick Motorsports	Chevrolet	399	23
15	18	22	Joey Logano	Team Penske	Ford	399	22
16	23	3	Austin Dillon	Richard Childress Racing	Chevrolet	399	21
17	9	4	Kevin Harvick	Stewart–Haas Racing	Ford	399	23
18	24	10	Danica Patrick	Stewart–Haas Racing	Ford	399	25
19	15	17	Ricky Stenhouse Jr.	Roush Fenway Racing	Ford	399	25
20	13	41	Kurt Busch	Stewart–Haas Racing	Ford	398	17
21	28	38	David Ragan	Front Row Motorsports	Ford	397	18
22	29	13	Ty Dillon (R)	Germain Racing	Chevrolet	397	15
23	11	21	Ryan Blaney	Wood Brothers Racing	Ford	397	14
24	20	6	Trevor Bayne	Roush Fenway Racing	Ford	396	13
25	14	43	Aric Almirola	Richard Petty Motorsports	Ford	396	12
26	25	27	Paul Menard	Richard Childress Racing	Chevrolet	396	11
27	30	95	Michael McDowell	Leavine Family Racing	Chevrolet	396	10
28	27	47	A. J. Allmendinger	JTG Daugherty Racing	Chevrolet	395	9
29	31	34	Landon Cassill	Front Row Motorsports	Ford	394	8
30	22	37	Chris Buescher	JTG Daugherty Racing	Chevrolet	394	7
31	40	32	Matt DiBenedetto	Go Fas Racing	Ford	393	6
32	33	72	Cole Whitt	TriStar Motorsports	Chevrolet	392	5
33	34	83	Brett Moffitt (i)	BK Racing	Toyota	391	0
34	37	23	Corey LaJoie (R)	BK Racing	Toyota	389	3
35	6	11	Denny Hamlin	Joe Gibbs Racing	Toyota	374	8
36	36	51	B. J. McLeod (i)	Rick Ware Racing	Chevrolet	372	0
37	38	33	Jeffrey Earnhardt	Circle Sport – The Motorsports Group	Chevrolet	368	1
38	32	15	Ross Chastain (i)	Premium Motorsports	Chevrolet	348	0
39	39	55	Reed Sorenson	Premium Motorsports	Toyota	162	1
40	35	66	Timmy Hill (i)	MBM Motorsports	Chevrolet	39	0
Official race results

=== Race statistics ===
- Lead changes: 6 among different drivers
- Cautions/Laps: 4 for 24
- Red flags: 1 for 15 minutes and 9 seconds
- Time of race: 3 hours, 5 minutes and 48 seconds
- Average speed: 129.171 miles per hour (207.881 km/h)

== Media ==
=== Television ===
NBC Sports covered the race on the television side. Rick Allen, Jeff Burton, and Steve Letarte called the race in the booth. Dave Burns, Parker Kligerman, Marty Snider, and Kelli Stavast reported from pit lane during the race.

NBCSN
Booth announcers	Pit reporters
Lap-by-lap: Rick Allen; Color-commentator: Jeff Burton; Color-commentator: Steve Letarte	Dave Burns; Parker Kligerman; Marty Snider; Kelli Stavast

=== Radio ===
Motor Racing Network had the radio call for the race, which was simulcast on Sirius XM NASCAR Radio.

MRN
Booth announcers	Turn announcers	Pit reporters
Lead announcer: Kurt Becker; Announcer: Jeff Striegle; Announcer: Rusty Wallace	Backstretch: Mike Bagley	Alex Hayden; Winston Kelley; Steve Post; Kim Coon

== Standings after the race ==
Drivers' Championship standings

	Pos	Driver	Points
	1	Martin Truex Jr.	3,059
1	2	Kyle Busch	3,041 (–18)
1	3	Kyle Larson	3,034 (–25)
	4	Brad Keselowski	3,020 (–39)
2	5	Jimmie Johnson	3,017 (–42)
4	6	Kevin Harvick	3,015 (–44)
2	7	Denny Hamlin	3,013 (–46)
4	8	Ricky Stenhouse Jr.	3,010 (–49)
1	9	Ryan Blaney	3,008 (–51)
1	10	Chase Elliott	3,006 (–53)
5	11	Matt Kenseth	3,005 (–54)
1	12	Jamie McMurray	3,003 (–56)
1	13	Ryan Newman	2,067 (–992)
1	14	Austin Dillon	2,065 (–994)
1	15	Kasey Kahne	2,046 (–1,013)
1	16	Kurt Busch	2,044 (–1,015)
Official driver's standings

Manufacturers' Championship standings

Pos	Manufacturer	Points
1	Toyota	1,026
2	Chevrolet	1,020 (–6)
3	Ford	1,007 (–19)
Official manufacturers' standings

- Note: Only the first 16 positions are included for the driver standings.

Previous race: 2017 ISM Connect 300	Monster Energy NASCAR Cup Series; 2017 season	Next race: 2017 Bank of America 500
