= 2017 ISM Connect 300 =

Race details
- Race 28 of 36 in the 2017 Monster Energy NASCAR Cup Series
- Date: September 24, 2017
- Location: New Hampshire Motor Speedway in Loudon, New Hampshire
- Course: Permanent racing facility
- Course length: 1.058 miles (1.703 km)
- Distance: 300 laps, 317.4 mi (510.9 km)
- Average speed: 108.958 miles per hour (175.351 km/h)

Pole position
Driver	Kyle Busch	Joe Gibbs Racing
- Time: 28.203

Most laps led
Driver	Kyle Busch	Joe Gibbs Racing
- Laps: 187

Winner
No. 18	Kyle Busch	Joe Gibbs Racing

Television in the United States
- Network: NBCSN
- Announcers: Rick Allen, Jeff Burton and Steve Letarte

Radio in the United States
- Radio: PRN
- Booth announcers: Mark Garrow, Jim Noble and Jeff Hammond
- Turn announcers: Rob Albright (1 & 2) and Pat Patterson (3 & 4)

The 2017 ISM Connect 300 was a Monster Energy NASCAR Cup Series race held on September 24, 2017, at New Hampshire Motor Speedway in Loudon, New Hampshire. Contested over 300 laps on the 1.058-mile (1.703 km) speedway, it was the 28th race of the 2017 Monster Energy NASCAR Cup Series season, the second race of the Playoffs, and the second race of the Round of 16.

This was the final running of the New Hampshire fall race, as the race was dropped for the Las Vegas fall race in 2018.

== Entry list ==
No.	Driver	Team	Manufacturer
1	Jamie McMurray	Chip Ganassi Racing	Chevrolet
2	Brad Keselowski	Team Penske	Ford
3	Austin Dillon	Richard Childress Racing	Chevrolet
4	Kevin Harvick	Stewart–Haas Racing	Ford
5	Kasey Kahne	Hendrick Motorsports	Chevrolet
6	Trevor Bayne	Roush Fenway Racing	Ford
10	Danica Patrick	Stewart–Haas Racing	Ford
11	Denny Hamlin	Joe Gibbs Racing	Toyota
13	Ty Dillon (R)	Germain Racing	Chevrolet
14	Clint Bowyer	Stewart–Haas Racing	Ford
15	Reed Sorenson	Premium Motorsports	Chevrolet
17	Ricky Stenhouse Jr.	Roush Fenway Racing	Ford
18	Kyle Busch	Joe Gibbs Racing	Toyota
19	Daniel Suárez (R)	Joe Gibbs Racing	Toyota
20	Matt Kenseth	Joe Gibbs Racing	Toyota
21	Ryan Blaney	Wood Brothers Racing	Ford
22	Joey Logano	Team Penske	Ford
23	Corey LaJoie (R)	BK Racing	Toyota
24	Chase Elliott	Hendrick Motorsports	Chevrolet
27	Paul Menard	Richard Childress Racing	Chevrolet
31	Ryan Newman	Richard Childress Racing	Chevrolet
32	Matt DiBenedetto	Go Fas Racing	Ford
33	Jeffrey Earnhardt	Circle Sport – The Motorsports Group	Chevrolet
34	Landon Cassill	Front Row Motorsports	Ford
37	Chris Buescher	JTG Daugherty Racing	Chevrolet
38	David Ragan	Front Row Motorsports	Ford
41	Kurt Busch	Stewart–Haas Racing	Ford
42	Kyle Larson	Chip Ganassi Racing	Chevrolet
43	Aric Almirola	Richard Petty Motorsports	Ford
47	A. J. Allmendinger	JTG Daugherty Racing	Chevrolet
48	Jimmie Johnson	Hendrick Motorsports	Chevrolet
51	Cody Ware	Rick Ware Racing	Chevrolet
55	Gray Gaulding (R)	Premium Motorsports	Toyota
72	Cole Whitt	TriStar Motorsports	Chevrolet
77	Erik Jones (R)	Furniture Row Racing	Toyota
78	Martin Truex Jr.	Furniture Row Racing	Toyota
83	Brett Moffitt (i)	BK Racing	Toyota
88	Dale Earnhardt Jr.	Hendrick Motorsports	Chevrolet
95	Michael McDowell	Leavine Family Racing	Chevrolet
Official entry list

== Practice ==
=== First practice ===
Kyle Larson was the fastest in the first practice session with a time of 28.065 seconds and a speed of 135.714 mph (218.411 km/h).

Pos	No.	Driver	Team	Manufacturer	Time	Speed
1	42	Kyle Larson	Chip Ganassi Racing	Chevrolet	28.065	135.714
2	18	Kyle Busch	Joe Gibbs Racing	Toyota	28.142	135.342
3	5	Kasey Kahne	Hendrick Motorsports	Chevrolet	28.172	135.198
Official first practice results

=== Second practice ===
Kyle Larson was the fastest in the second practice session with a time of 28.727 and a speed of 132.586 mph (213.376 km/h).

Pos	No.	Driver	Team	Manufacturer	Time	Speed
1	42	Kyle Larson	Chip Ganassi Racing	Chevrolet	28.727	132.586
2	21	Ryan Blaney	Wood Brothers Racing	Ford	28.742	132.517
3	78	Martin Truex Jr.	Furniture Row Racing	Toyota	28.745	132.503
Official second practice results

=== Final practice ===
Martin Truex Jr. was the fastest in the final practice session with a time of 28.932 and a speed of 131.647 mph (211.865 km/h).

Pos	No.	Driver	Team	Manufacturer	Time	Speed
1	78	Martin Truex Jr.	Furniture Row Racing	Toyota	28.932	131.647
2	4	Kevin Harvick	Stewart–Haas Racing	Ford	28.935	131.633
3	18	Kyle Busch	Joe Gibbs Racing	Toyota	28.961	131.515
Official final practice results

== Qualifying ==
Kyle Busch scored the pole for the race with a time of 28.203 and a speed of 135.049 mph (217.340 km/h).

=== Qualifying results ===
Pos	No.	Driver	Team	Manufacturer	R1	R2	R3
1	18	Kyle Busch	Joe Gibbs Racing	Toyota	28.309	28.395	28.203
2	42	Kyle Larson	Chip Ganassi Racing	Chevrolet	28.524	28.287	28.232
3	11	Denny Hamlin	Joe Gibbs Racing	Toyota	28.558	28.276	28.263
4	21	Ryan Blaney	Wood Brothers Racing	Ford	28.592	28.265	28.272
5	78	Martin Truex Jr.	Furniture Row Racing	Toyota	28.605	28.383	28.384
6	4	Kevin Harvick	Stewart–Haas Racing	Ford	28.552	28.423	28.401
7	41	Kurt Busch	Stewart–Haas Racing	Ford	28.622	28.420	28.427
8	77	Erik Jones (R)	Furniture Row Racing	Toyota	28.555	28.467	28.430
9	5	Kasey Kahne	Hendrick Motorsports	Chevrolet	28.581	28.324	28.431
10	20	Matt Kenseth	Joe Gibbs Racing	Toyota	28.653	28.408	28.490
11	1	Jamie McMurray	Chip Ganassi Racing	Chevrolet	28.502	28.416	28.492
12	48	Jimmie Johnson	Hendrick Motorsports	Chevrolet	28.502	28.496	28.857
13	2	Brad Keselowski	Team Penske	Ford	28.723	28.547	—
14	24	Chase Elliott	Hendrick Motorsports	Chevrolet	28.710	28.561	—
15	88	Dale Earnhardt Jr.	Hendrick Motorsports	Chevrolet	28.549	28.566	—
16	14	Clint Bowyer	Stewart–Haas Racing	Ford	28.588	28.590	—
17	3	Austin Dillon	Richard Childress Racing	Chevrolet	28.729	28.609	—
18	31	Ryan Newman	Richard Childress Racing	Chevrolet	28.628	28.636	—
19	27	Paul Menard	Richard Childress Racing	Chevrolet	28.629	28.675	—
20	47	A. J. Allmendinger	JTG Daugherty Racing	Chevrolet	28.747	28.687	—
21	38	David Ragan	Front Row Motorsports	Ford	28.701	28.687	—
22	37	Chris Buescher	JTG Daugherty Racing	Chevrolet	28.747	28.747	—
23	6	Trevor Bayne	Roush Fenway Racing	Ford	28.740	28.794	—
24	17	Ricky Stenhouse Jr.	Roush Fenway Racing	Ford	28.753	28.936	—
25	19	Daniel Suárez (R)	Joe Gibbs Racing	Toyota	28.753	—	—
26	32	Matt DiBenedetto	Go Fas Racing	Ford	28.766	—	—
27	10	Danica Patrick	Stewart–Haas Racing	Ford	28.771	—	—
28	34	Landon Cassill	Front Row Motorsports	Ford	28.840	—	—
29	43	Aric Almirola	Richard Petty Motorsports	Ford	28.894	—	—
30	13	Ty Dillon (R)	Germain Racing	Chevrolet	28.920	—	—
31	95	Michael McDowell	Leavine Family Racing	Chevrolet	28.924	—	—
32	72	Cole Whitt	TriStar Motorsports	Chevrolet	29.092	—	—
33	23	Corey LaJoie (R)	BK Racing	Toyota	29.107	—	—
34	55	Gray Gaulding (R)	Premium Motorsports	Toyota	29.257	—	—
35	15	Reed Sorenson	Premium Motorsports	Chevrolet	29.317	—	—
36	83	Brett Moffitt (i)	BK Racing	Toyota	29.364	—	—
37	33	Jeffrey Earnhardt	Circle Sport – The Motorsports Group	Chevrolet	29.886	—	—
38	51	Cody Ware	Rick Ware Racing	Chevrolet	30.560	—	—
39	22	Joey Logano	Team Penske	Ford	0.000	—	—
Official qualifying results

== Race ==
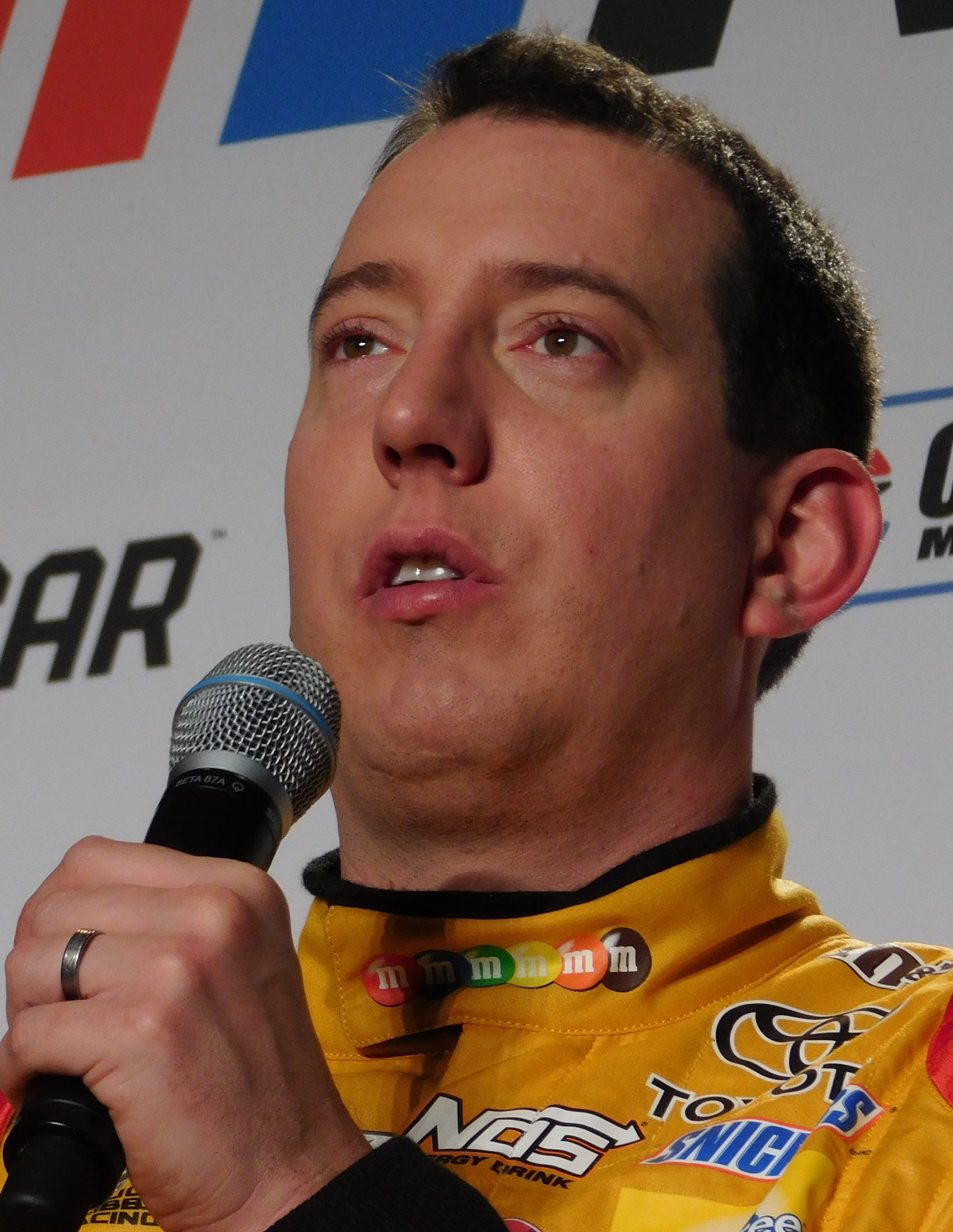
Kyle Busch won the race from the pole position.

=== Race results ===
==== Stage results ====
Stage 1 Laps: 75

Pos	No	Driver	Team	Manufacturer	Points
1	78	Martin Truex Jr.	Furniture Row Racing	Toyota	10
2	42	Kyle Larson	Chip Ganassi Racing	Chevrolet	9
3	18	Kyle Busch	Joe Gibbs Racing	Toyota	8
4	77	Erik Jones (R)	Furniture Row Racing	Toyota	7
5	21	Ryan Blaney	Wood Brothers Racing	Ford	6
6	20	Matt Kenseth	Joe Gibbs Racing	Toyota	5
7	2	Brad Keselowski	Team Penske	Ford	4
8	48	Jimmie Johnson	Hendrick Motorsports	Chevrolet	3
9	11	Denny Hamlin	Joe Gibbs Racing	Toyota	2
10	4	Kevin Harvick	Stewart–Haas Racing	Ford	1
Official stage one results

Stage 2 Laps: 75

Pos	No	Driver	Team	Manufacturer	Points
1	18	Kyle Busch	Joe Gibbs Racing	Toyota	10
2	20	Matt Kenseth	Joe Gibbs Racing	Toyota	9
3	2	Brad Keselowski	Team Penske	Ford	8
4	77	Erik Jones (R)	Furniture Row Racing	Toyota	7
5	42	Kyle Larson	Chip Ganassi Racing	Chevrolet	6
6	78	Martin Truex Jr.	Furniture Row Racing	Toyota	5
7	48	Jimmie Johnson	Hendrick Motorsports	Chevrolet	4
8	11	Denny Hamlin	Joe Gibbs Racing	Toyota	3
9	21	Ryan Blaney	Wood Brothers Racing	Ford	2
10	1	Jamie McMurray	Chip Ganassi Racing	Chevrolet	1
Official stage two results

=== Final stage results ===
Stage 3 Laps: 150

Pos	Grid	No	Driver	Team	Manufacturer	Laps	Points
1	1	18	Kyle Busch	Joe Gibbs Racing	Toyota	300	58
2	2	42	Kyle Larson	Chip Ganassi Racing	Chevrolet	300	50
3	10	20	Matt Kenseth	Joe Gibbs Racing	Toyota	300	48
4	13	2	Brad Keselowski	Team Penske	Ford	300	45
5	5	78	Martin Truex Jr.	Furniture Row Racing	Toyota	300	47
6	8	77	Erik Jones (R)	Furniture Row Racing	Toyota	300	45
7	16	14	Clint Bowyer	Stewart–Haas Racing	Ford	300	30
8	25	19	Daniel Suárez (R)	Joe Gibbs Racing	Toyota	300	29
9	4	21	Ryan Blaney	Wood Brothers Racing	Ford	300	36
10	39	22	Joey Logano	Team Penske	Ford	300	27
11	14	24	Chase Elliott	Hendrick Motorsports	Chevrolet	300	26
12	3	11	Denny Hamlin	Joe Gibbs Racing	Toyota	300	30
13	18	31	Ryan Newman	Richard Childress Racing	Chevrolet	300	24
14	12	48	Jimmie Johnson	Hendrick Motorsports	Chevrolet	300	30
15	24	17	Ricky Stenhouse Jr.	Roush Fenway Racing	Ford	300	22
16	11	1	Jamie McMurray	Chip Ganassi Racing	Chevrolet	300	22
17	20	47	A. J. Allmendinger	JTG Daugherty Racing	Chevrolet	300	20
18	27	10	Danica Patrick	Stewart–Haas Racing	Ford	300	19
19	17	3	Austin Dillon	Richard Childress Racing	Chevrolet	300	18
20	19	27	Paul Menard	Richard Childress Racing	Chevrolet	300	17
21	22	37	Chris Buescher	JTG Daugherty Racing	Chevrolet	299	16
22	30	13	Ty Dillon (R)	Germain Racing	Chevrolet	298	15
23	31	95	Michael McDowell	Leavine Family Racing	Chevrolet	298	14
24	23	6	Trevor Bayne	Roush Fenway Racing	Ford	298	13
25	28	34	Landon Cassill	Front Row Motorsports	Ford	298	12
26	29	43	Aric Almirola	Richard Petty Motorsports	Ford	297	11
27	33	23	Corey LaJoie (R)	BK Racing	Toyota	297	10
28	35	15	Reed Sorenson	Premium Motorsports	Chevrolet	297	9
29	21	38	David Ragan	Front Row Motorsports	Ford	296	8
30	32	72	Cole Whitt	TriStar Motorsports	Chevrolet	296	7
31	26	32	Matt DiBenedetto	Go Fas Racing	Ford	295	6
32	36	83	Brett Moffitt (i)	BK Racing	Toyota	294	0
33	34	55	Gray Gaulding (R)	Premium Motorsports	Toyota	293	4
34	15	88	Dale Earnhardt Jr.	Hendrick Motorsports	Chevrolet	289	3
35	9	5	Kasey Kahne	Hendrick Motorsports	Chevrolet	289	2
36	6	4	Kevin Harvick	Stewart–Haas Racing	Ford	148	2
37	7	41	Kurt Busch	Stewart–Haas Racing	Ford	148	1
38	37	33	Jeffrey Earnhardt	Circle Sport – The Motorsports Group	Chevrolet	143	1
39	38	51	Cody Ware	Rick Ware Racing	Chevrolet	74	1
Official race results

=== Race statistics ===
- Lead changes: 3 among different drivers
- Cautions/Laps: 6 for 32
- Red flags: 1 for 13 minutes and 1 second
- Time of race: 2 hours, 54 minutes and 47 seconds
- Average speed: 108.958 miles per hour (175.351 km/h)

== Media ==
=== Television ===
NBC Sports covered the race on the television side. Rick Allen, Jeff Burton and Steve Letarte had the call in the booth for the race. Parker Kligerman, Marty Snider, and Kelli Stavast reported from pit lane during the race.

NBCSN
Booth announcers	Pit reporters
Lap-by-lap: Rick Allen; Color-commentator: Jeff Burton; Color-commentator: Steve Letarte	Parker Kligerman; Marty Snider; Kelli Stavast

=== Radio ===
The Performance Racing Network had the radio call for the race, which was simulcast on Sirius XM NASCAR Radio.

PRN
Booth announcers	Turn announcers	Pit reporters
Lead announcer: Mark Garrow; Announcer: Jim Noble; Announcer: Jeff Hammond	Turns 1 & 2: Rob Albright; Turns 3 & 4: Pat Patterson	Brad Gillie; Brett McMillan; Wendy Venturini

== Standings after the race ==
Drivers' Championship standings

	Pos	Driver	Points
	1	Martin Truex Jr.	2,149
	2	Kyle Larson	2,125 (–24)
2	3	Kyle Busch	2,119 (–30)
	4	Brad Keselowski	2,106 (–43)
2	5	Denny Hamlin	2,088 (–61)
3	6	Matt Kenseth	2,087 (–62)
1	7	Jimmie Johnson	2,076 (–73)
2	8	Ryan Blaney	2,070 (–79)
3	9	Chase Elliott	2,070 (–79)
7	10	Kevin Harvick	2,069 (–80)
	11	Jamie McMurray	2,053 (–96)
2	12	Ricky Stenhouse Jr.	2,044 (–105)
1	13	Austin Dillon	2,044 (–105)
2	14	Ryan Newman	2,043 (–106)
2	15	Kurt Busch	2,027 (–122)
1	16	Kasey Kahne	2,023 (–126)
Official driver's standings

Manufacturers' Championship standings

	Pos	Manufacturer	Points
1	1	Toyota	986
1	2	Chevrolet	985 (–1)
	3	Ford	976 (–10)
Official manufacturers' standings

- Note: Only the first 16 positions are included for the driver standings.

Previous race: 2017 Tales of the Turtles 400	Monster Energy NASCAR Cup Series; 2017 season	Next race: 2017 Apache Warrior 400
