= 2016 Hellmann's 500 =

Race details
- Race 32 of 36 in the 2016 NASCAR Sprint Cup Series
- Date: October 23, 2016
- Location: Talladega Superspeedway in Lincoln, Alabama
- Course: Permanent racing facility
- Course length: 2.66 miles (4.281 km)
- Distance: 192 laps, 510.72 mi (821.924 km)
- Scheduled distance: 188 laps, 500.08 mi (804.801 km)
- Average speed: 159.905 miles per hour (257.342 km/h)

Pole position
Driver	Martin Truex Jr.	Furniture Row Racing
- Time: 49.508

Most laps led
Driver	Brad Keselowski	Team Penske
- Laps: 90

Winner
No. 22	Joey Logano	Team Penske

Television in the United States
- Network: NBCSN
- Announcers: Rick Allen, Jeff Burton, Steve Letarte and Dale Earnhardt Jr.

Radio in the United States
- Radio: MRN
- Booth announcers: Joe Moore, Jeff Striegle and Rusty Wallace
- Turn announcers: Dave Moody (1 & 2), Mike Bagley (Backstretch) and Kyle Rickey (3 & 4)

The 2016 Hellmann's 500 was a NASCAR Sprint Cup Series race held on October 23, 2016, at Talladega Superspeedway in Lincoln, Alabama. Contested over 192 laps on the 2.66-mile (4.28-kilometre) superspeedway, it was the 32nd race of the 2016 NASCAR Sprint Cup Series season, sixth race of the Chase and final race of the Round of 12. The race was won by Team Penske's Joey Logano in a green–white–checkered finish, advancing to the Round of 8 as a result.

== Entry list ==
No.	Driver	Team	Manufacturer
1	Jamie McMurray	Chip Ganassi Racing	Chevrolet
2	Brad Keselowski	Team Penske	Ford
3	Austin Dillon	Richard Childress Racing	Chevrolet
4	Kevin Harvick	Stewart–Haas Racing	Chevrolet
5	Kasey Kahne	Hendrick Motorsports	Chevrolet
6	Trevor Bayne	Roush Fenway Racing	Ford
7	Regan Smith	Tommy Baldwin Racing	Chevrolet
10	Danica Patrick	Stewart–Haas Racing	Chevrolet
11	Denny Hamlin	Joe Gibbs Racing	Toyota
13	Casey Mears	Germain Racing	Chevrolet
14	Tony Stewart	Stewart–Haas Racing	Chevrolet
15	Clint Bowyer	HScott Motorsports	Chevrolet
16	Greg Biffle	Roush Fenway Racing	Ford
17	Ricky Stenhouse Jr.	Roush Fenway Racing	Ford
18	Kyle Busch	Joe Gibbs Racing	Toyota
19	Carl Edwards	Joe Gibbs Racing	Toyota
20	Matt Kenseth	Joe Gibbs Racing	Toyota
21	Ryan Blaney (R)	Wood Brothers Racing	Ford
22	Joey Logano	Team Penske	Ford
23	David Ragan	BK Racing	Toyota
24	Chase Elliott (R)	Hendrick Motorsports	Chevrolet
27	Paul Menard	Richard Childress Racing	Chevrolet
31	Ryan Newman	Richard Childress Racing	Chevrolet
32	Bobby Labonte	Go FAS Racing	Ford
34	Chris Buescher (R)	Front Row Motorsports	Ford
35	David Gilliland	Front Row Motorsports	Ford
38	Landon Cassill	Front Row Motorsports	Ford
41	Kurt Busch	Stewart–Haas Racing	Chevrolet
42	Kyle Larson	Chip Ganassi Racing	Chevrolet
43	Aric Almirola	Richard Petty Motorsports	Ford
44	Brian Scott (R)	Richard Petty Motorsports	Ford
46	Michael Annett	HScott Motorsports	Chevrolet
47	A. J. Allmendinger	JTG Daugherty Racing	Chevrolet
48	Jimmie Johnson	Hendrick Motorsports	Chevrolet
55	Reed Sorenson	Premium Motorsports	Toyota
78	Martin Truex Jr.	Furniture Row Racing	Toyota
83	Jeffrey Earnhardt (R)	BK Racing	Toyota
88	Alex Bowman (i)	Hendrick Motorsports	Chevrolet
93	Matt DiBenedetto	BK Racing	Toyota
95	Michael McDowell	Circle Sport – Leavine Family Racing	Chevrolet
99	Ryan Reed (i)	Roush Fenway Racing	Ford
Official entry list

== Practice ==
=== First practice ===
Greg Biffle was the fastest in the first practice session with a time of 48.133 and a speed of 198.949 mph (320.177 km/h).

Pos	No.	Driver	Team	Manufacturer	Time	Speed
1	16	Greg Biffle	Roush Fenway Racing	Ford	48.133	198.949
2	47	A. J. Allmendinger	JTG Daugherty Racing	Chevrolet	48.284	198.327
3	34	Chris Buescher (R)	Front Row Motorsports	Ford	48.300	198.261
Official first practice results

=== Final practice ===
Jimmie Johnson was the fastest in the final practice session with a time of 48.761 and a speed of 196.386 mph (316.053 km/h).

Pos	No.	Driver	Team	Manufacturer	Time	Speed
1	48	Jimmie Johnson	Hendrick Motorsports	Chevrolet	48.761	196.386
2	20	Matt Kenseth	Joe Gibbs Racing	Toyota	48.773	196.338
3	24	Chase Elliott (R)	Hendrick Motorsports	Chevrolet	48.774	196.334
Official final practice results

== Qualifying ==
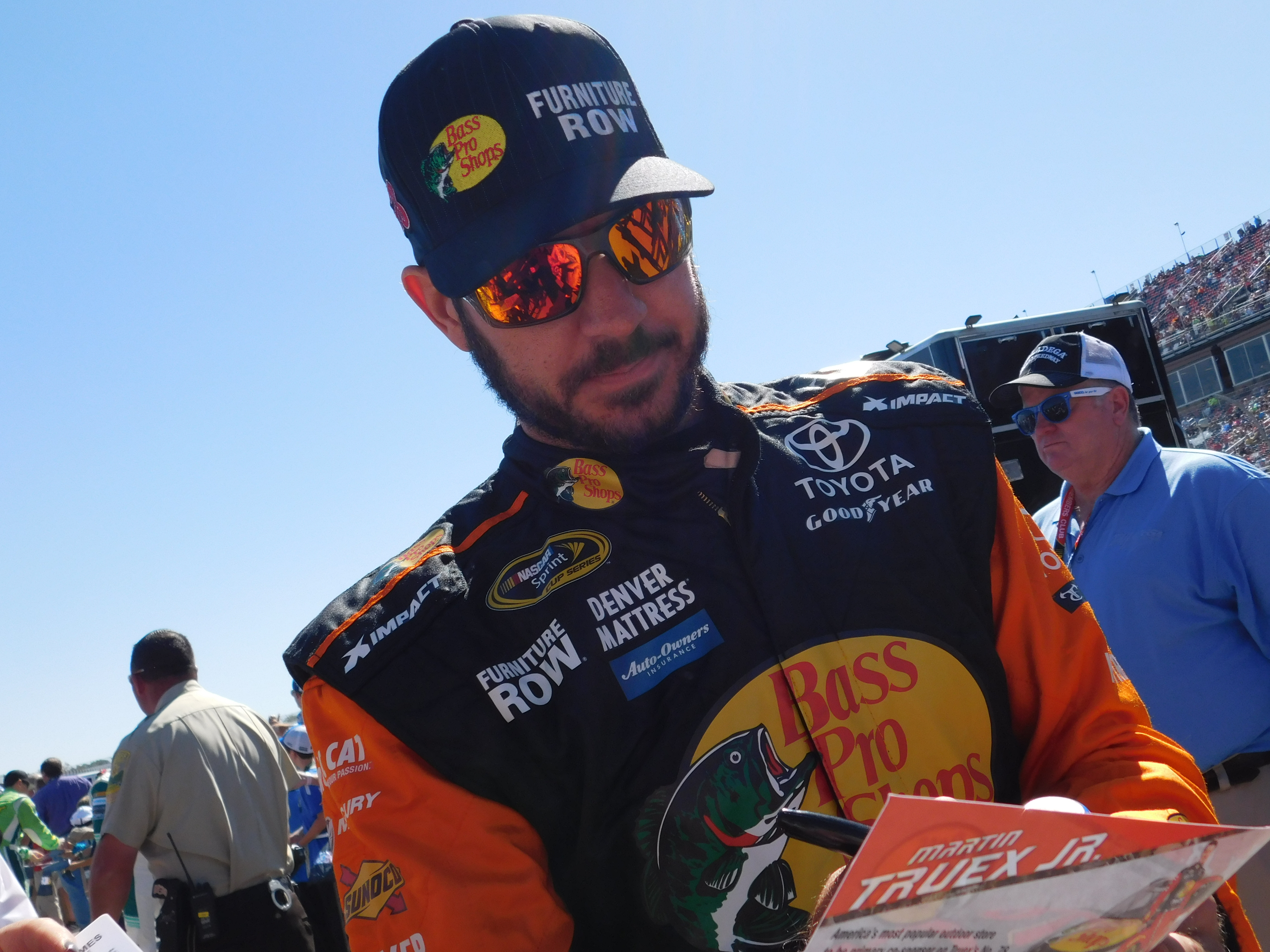
Martin Truex Jr. scored the pole position.

Martin Truex Jr. scored the pole for the race with a time of 49.508 and a speed of 193.423 mph (311.284 km/h). He said afterwards that winning the pole was "definitely cool. You come here, and you don't really have a whole lot to say as a driver when it comes to qualifying, so obviously proud of the team and proud of everybody in Denver (Colorado) and proud of everybody at the race track for their efforts. Built a brand new car to come here, and it's awesome to be the fastest guy in town. Excited about that, and obviously everybody at TRD (Toyota Racing Development) who builds the engines has done a great job too – it takes a lot to get a restrictor plate pole, so excited for all those guys and really neat to lead Toyota to their 1,000th start (in NASCAR’s top three series combined). Hopefully, we'll be able to get the victory when the day is over."

=== Qualifying results ===
Pos	No.	Driver	Team	Manufacturer	R1	R2
1	78	Martin Truex Jr.	Furniture Row Racing	Toyota	49.650	49.508
2	2	Brad Keselowski	Team Penske	Ford	49.668	49.523
3	20	Matt Kenseth	Joe Gibbs Racing	Toyota	49.680	49.568
4	24	Chase Elliott (R)	Hendrick Motorsports	Chevrolet	49.736	49.574
5	16	Greg Biffle	Roush Fenway Racing	Ford	49.731	49.585
6	17	Ricky Stenhouse Jr.	Roush Fenway Racing	Ford	49.789	49.623
7	41	Kurt Busch	Stewart–Haas Racing	Chevrolet	49.786	49.682
8	11	Denny Hamlin	Joe Gibbs Racing	Toyota	49.813	49.717
9	3	Austin Dillon	Richard Childress Racing	Chevrolet	49.824	49.829
10	27	Paul Menard	Richard Childress Racing	Chevrolet	49.809	49.843
11	6	Trevor Bayne	Roush Fenway Racing	Ford	49.824	49.865
12	55	Reed Sorenson	Premium Motorsports	Toyota	49.324	50.855
13	19	Carl Edwards	Joe Gibbs Racing	Toyota	49.841	
14	18	Kyle Busch	Joe Gibbs Racing	Toyota	49.865	
15	21	Ryan Blaney (R)	Wood Brothers Racing	Ford	49.865	
16	22	Joey Logano	Team Penske	Ford	49.872	
17	48	Jimmie Johnson	Hendrick Motorsports	Chevrolet	49.952	
18	99	Ryan Reed (i)	Roush Fenway Racing	Ford	49.953	
19	88	Alex Bowman (i)	Hendrick Motorsports	Chevrolet	49.972	
20	31	Ryan Newman	Richard Childress Racing	Chevrolet	50.014	
21	14	Tony Stewart	Stewart–Haas Racing	Chevrolet	50.146	
22	4	Kevin Harvick	Stewart–Haas Racing	Chevrolet	50.197	
23	1	Jamie McMurray	Chip Ganassi Racing	Chevrolet	50.296	
24	42	Kyle Larson	Chip Ganassi Racing	Chevrolet	50.357	
25	44	Brian Scott (R)	Richard Petty Motorsports	Ford	50.393	
26	43	Aric Almirola	Richard Petty Motorsports	Ford	50.399	
27	5	Kasey Kahne	Hendrick Motorsports	Chevrolet	50.429	
28	13	Casey Mears	Germain Racing	Chevrolet	50.465	
29	7	Regan Smith	Tommy Baldwin Racing	Chevrolet	50.483	
30	10	Danica Patrick	Stewart–Haas Racing	Chevrolet	50.495	
31	38	Landon Cassill	Front Row Motorsports	Ford	50.503	
32	47	A. J. Allmendinger	JTG Daugherty Racing	Chevrolet	50.529	
33	34	Chris Buescher (R)	Front Row Motorsports	Ford	50.602	
34	95	Michael McDowell	Circle Sport – Leavine Family Racing	Chevrolet	50.727	
35	93	Matt DiBenedetto	BK Racing	Toyota	50.823	
36	15	Clint Bowyer	HScott Motorsports	Chevrolet	50.913	
37	46	Michael Annett	HScott Motorsports	Chevrolet	50.938	
38	32	Bobby Labonte	Go FAS Racing	Ford	51.108	
39	83	Jeffrey Earnhardt (R)	BK Racing	Toyota	51.273	
40	23	David Ragan	BK Racing	Toyota	51.385	
Did not qualify
41	35	David Gilliland	Front Row Motorsports	Ford	50.912	
Official qualifying results

== Race ==
=== First half ===
Under clear blue Alabama skies, Martin Truex Jr. led the field to the green flag at 2:22 p.m. Brad Keselowski got a run on him going down the backstretch to lead the first lap. He led the first 12 before Truex got alongside him in turn 1 to take the lead on lap 13, only to give it back to him a lap later. Keselowski spent much of the run blocking all three lanes while controlling the lead. Doing so allowed Chase Elliott to move under him in turn 3 and take the lead on lap 26. Keselowski regained it briefly on lap 28 before Elliott powered by on the top in turn 1 to take the lead back on lap 29. Keselowski drove under him in the tri-oval to retake the lead on lap 32. A wave of cars hit pit road to start the first round of green flag stops on lap 37. Keselowski joined the next wave the following lap and handed the lead to Denny Hamlin. He pitted on lap 39 and handed the lead to Matt Kenseth. He pitted on lap 40 and handed the lead to Kyle Busch. After he pitted the following lap, the lead cycled back to Keselowski. A. J. Allmendinger and Hamlin were assessed pass through penalties for speeding, and Joey Logano was assessed a stop and go penalty for removing equipment (pit jack) from his pit box. “Nice to know we have the world record for the fastest jack,” joked Logano afterwards.

Truex brought out the first caution of the race on lap 41 after his engine blew up in turn 2. He said afterwards that the car "developed a vibration and started to lose a little bit of power. Originally I thought it could have been a tire because it was shaking worse and worse and worse until it was time to pit. I slowed down to hit pit road and felt the vibration still there and knew it was the engine." He added that it stung "to go out like that. We could have raced all day, gotten in a big wreck and still not made it ... but it sure would have been nice to at least find out, at least play the whole game, so to speak, and see what happened. To barely make it to the first pit stop stinks.” He went on to finish 40th.

The race restarted on lap 47. Keselowski led most of the run as he did the first by blocking all three lanes from advancing past him. Attempting to block Elliott's advance, Keselowski found himself without drafting help and Elliott took the lead on lap 62. Greg Biffle got a run on him going into turn 1 to take the lead the following lap. Elliott dropped to the bottom going into turn 1 and retook the lead on lap 76. Cars started pitting under green on lap 79. Elliott pitted the following lap and handed the lead to Hamlin. He pitted on lap 81 and handed the lead to Carl Edwards. He pitted on lap 82 and handed the lead to Michael Annett. When Annett pitted on lap 88, the lead cycled back to Keselowski.

=== Second half ===
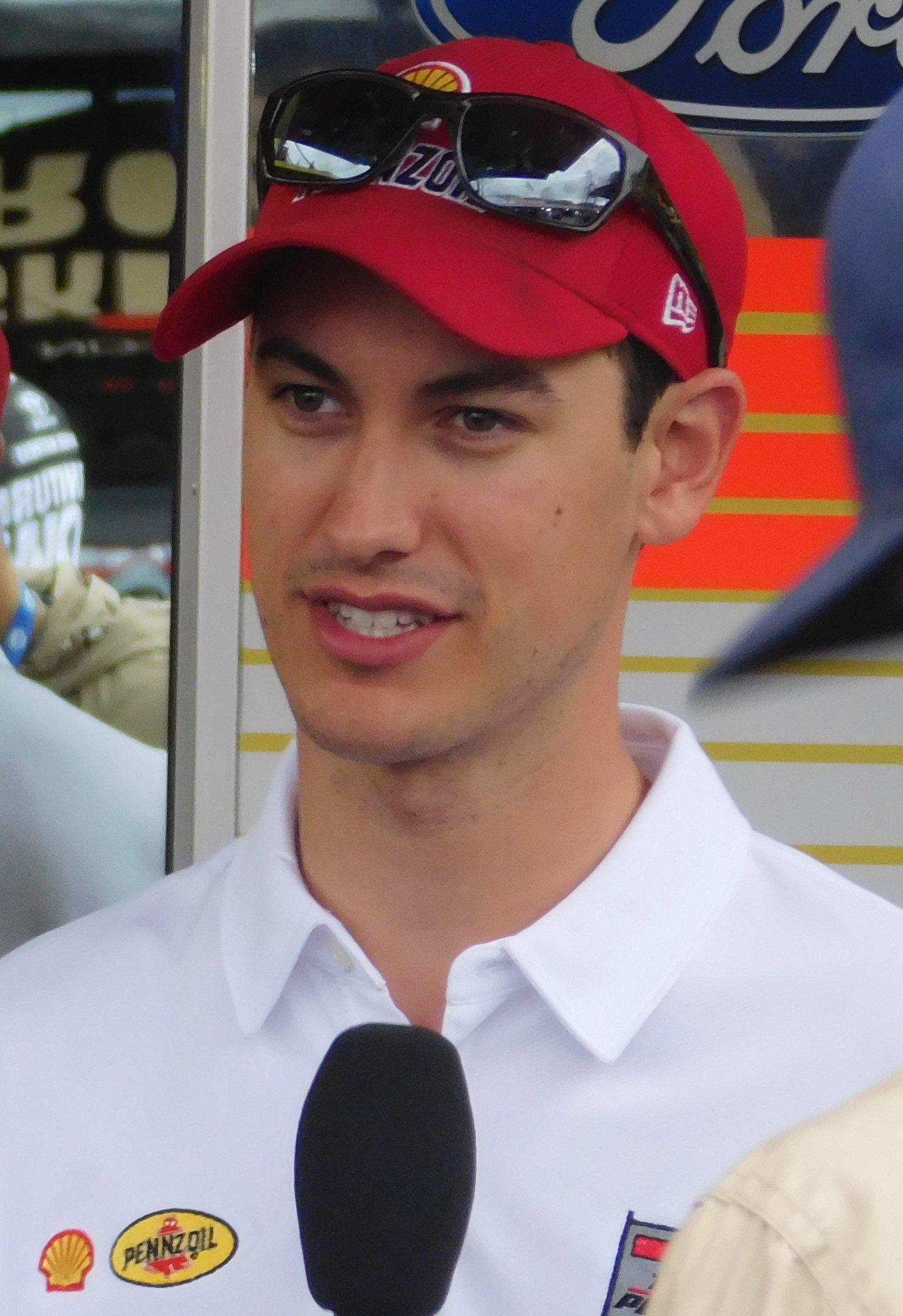
Joey Logano won the race.

After the round of stops, Keselowski led from lap 89 to 109. Ryan Blaney took the lead for a circuit on lap 110 and Hamlin moved back to the front on lap 111. A three-car wreck on the frontstretch involving Biffle, Jeffrey Earnhardt and Casey Mears brought out the second caution with 74 laps to go.

The race restarted with 68 to go. Keselowski moved back to the lead with 66 to go and held it until a piece of debris found itself lodged on the grille of his car with less than 50 laps remaining. With 44 to go, he let Blaney slid in front of him and assume the lead so that he could use the pocket of air to clean the trash off his grille (a common practice in NASCAR races, particularly at Daytona and Talladega). The plan worked and the debris flew off his grille, but his engine went up in smoke on the backstretch and brought out the third caution with 42 to go. He said afterwards that he's "not an engine guy, but the car was really strong and we definitely kept finding debris. I thought I got it cooled off and only got it slightly over, but I don't know. ... That's racing. We just had a tremendous race going, but it wasn't meant to be." After a round of pit stops, Logano assumed the race lead.

The race restarted with 39 to go and the caution flew for the fourth time for a corner panel laying on the backstretch before the field had completed the lap.

The race restarted with 35 to go. There were a few challenges to Logano for the lead, but nobody could get the lead from him. A three-car incident in turn 3 involving Trevor Bayne, Kasey Kahne and Jamie McMurray brought out the fifth caution with five to go.

The race restarted with three to go. As the field was coming to the line to get two laps to go, Alex Bowman spinning through the tri-oval brought out the sixth caution and forced overtime.

==== Overtime ====
Past the scheduled distance of 188 laps, the race restarted on lap 190 with two laps to go. Logano drove on to score the victory.

== Post-race ==
=== Driver comments ===
Logano said in victory lane that Talladega is "never a layup...It's always close. You never get a big lead. (Crew chief) Todd (Gordon) made some good adjustments during the race and found some speed in the car, so that was pretty neat to see some of that. We got that track position and just hung onto it. I was able to stay on the bottom and try to run the bottom and keep everyone in line, and that worked out really well."

Brian Scott, who earned a career-best runner-up finish, said that "a good finish always helps. It helps with the team. It helps with the guys at the shop, the morale. Just trying to get any bit of a bright spot in this year has been difficult. I think that this is by far the brightest spot that we’ve had in a really challenging 2016 for Richard Petty Motorsports. I don't know, I guess the results and what this does for us going forward is yet to be determined. But just proud. I mean, the guys have worked hard all year. They've deserved a lot better finishes than we’ve given them. Just proud to deliver a good, solid top five, to do my job behind the wheel to give us a shot at the win, just have a good day for Richard Petty Motorsports."

Hamlin, by a margin of six one-thousandths of a second (.006), beat Kurt Busch for third and advanced onto the Round of 8 over Austin Dillon via a tiebreaker. He said after the race that his team "needed some things to fall our way if we didn't win the race. Today things fell our way...But for me I really truly believe this is the first great fortune that we had in a Chase in my 11-year career. Things just happened well for us. We went out there and we did our jobs.”

Busch said his race "was really fun. Every time I would make a mistake and get shuffled to the middle it seemed like the crew guys would bring back a solid pit stop to put us in position and to be in control,” Busch said. “It feels good when we have that plus alongside our name in points. I was trying to ease it for Tony Gibson (crew chief) and all these guys that work so hard. There was some rooting and gouging at the end and I got some damage. I don’t even know where we finished, but all I was shooting for was top 15.” After the race, it appeared that Kevin Harvick came up to his car and punched him as a result of a misunderstanding. Busch told NBCSN that Harvick "has a misunderstanding of the call at the end of the race. He'll understand it and I'm sure he'll clear it up in his interview. For us, we're great teammates, we're doing good together and we have to work together to beat all these other teams out there. And he knows that."

Dillon, who missed moving onto the Round of 8 on a tiebreaker with Hamlin despite finishing ninth, said he "just couldn't get another spot. We got a couple there at the end, on the last little straight, but (Aric Almirola) was the car we needed and didn't work out. I knew we needed to be in the top 10 because Denny was up front. I was just trying to get as many spots as I could. I was forcing myself in places that probably really weren't there but made it work. Needed a little bit more speed today and little bit more help if we could. But we tried.”

== Race results ==
Pos	No.	Driver	Team	Manufacturer	Laps	Pts
1	22	Joey Logano	Team Penske	Ford	192	44
2	44	Brian Scott (R)	Richard Petty Motorsports	Ford	192	39
3	11	Denny Hamlin	Joe Gibbs Racing	Toyota	192	39
4	41	Kurt Busch	Stewart–Haas Racing	Chevrolet	192	37
5	17	Ricky Stenhouse Jr.	Roush Fenway Racing	Ford	192	37
6	42	Kyle Larson	Chip Ganassi Racing	Chevrolet	192	35
7	4	Kevin Harvick	Stewart–Haas Racing	Chevrolet	192	34
8	43	Aric Almirola	Richard Petty Motorsports	Ford	192	33
9	3	Austin Dillon	Richard Childress Racing	Chevrolet	192	33
10	47	A. J. Allmendinger	JTG Daughtery Racing	Chevrolet	192	31
11	21	Ryan Blaney (R)	Wood Brothers Racing	Ford	192	31
12	24	Chase Elliott (R)	Hendrick Motorsports	Chevrolet	192	30
13	27	Paul Menard	Richard Childress Racing	Chevrolet	192	29
14	31	Ryan Newman	Richard Childress Racing	Chevrolet	192	28
15	16	Greg Biffle	Roush Fenway Racing	Ford	192	27
16	95	Michael McDowell	Circle Sport – Leavine Family Racing	Chevrolet	192	25
17	6	Trevor Bayne	Roush Fenway Racing	Ford	192	24
18	15	Clint Bowyer	HScott Motorsports	Chevrolet	192	23
19	1	Jamie McMurray	Chip Ganassi Racing	Chevrolet	192	22
20	10	Danica Patrick	Stewart–Haas Racing	Chevrolet	192	21
21	38	Landon Cassill	Front Row Motorsports	Ford	192	20
22	34	Chris Buescher	Front Row Motorsports	Ford	192	19
23	48	Jimmie Johnson	Hendrick Motorsports	Chevrolet	192	18
24	23	David Ragan	BK Racing	Toyota	192	17
25	7	Regan Smith	Tommy Baldwin Racing	Chevrolet	192	16
26	99	Ryan Reed (i)	Roush Fenway Racing	Ford	192	0
27	93	Matt DiBenedetto	BK Racing	Toyota	192	14
28	20	Matt Kenseth	Joe Gibbs Racing	Toyota	192	14
29	19	Carl Edwards	Joe Gibbs Racing	Toyota	192	13
30	18	Kyle Busch	Joe Gibbs Racing	Toyota	192	12
31	32	Bobby Labonte	Go FAS Racing	Ford	192	10
32	14	Tony Stewart	Stewart–Haas Racing	Chevrolet	192	10
33	46	Michael Annett	HScott Motorsports	Chevrolet	192	9
34	83	Jeffrey Earnhardt (R)	BK Racing	Toyota	192	7
35	5	Kasey Kahne	Hendrick Motorsports	Chevrolet	191	6
36	88	Alex Bowman (i)	Hendrick Motorsports	Chevrolet	191	0
37	55	Reed Sorenson	Premium Motorsports	Toyota	179	4
38	2	Brad Keselowski	Team Penske	Ford	144	5
39	13	Casey Mears	Germain Racing	Chevrolet	113	2
40	78	Martin Truex Jr.	Furniture Row Racing	Toyota	41	2
Official race results

=== Race summary ===
- Lead changes: 31 among 14 different drivers
- Cautions/Laps: 6 for 25 laps
- Red flags: 0
- Time of race: 3 hours, 11 minutes and 38 seconds
- Average speed: 159.905 miles per hour (257.342 km/h)

== Media ==
=== Television ===
NBCSN covered the race on the television side. Rick Allen, Jeff Burton and Steve Letarte called the race from the broadcast booth, with Dale Earnhardt Jr. joining the trio as a guest analyst. Dave Burns, Mike Massaro, Marty Snider and Kelli Stavast reported from pit road.

NBCSN
Booth announcers	Pit reporters
Lap-by-lap: Rick Allen; Color commentator: Jeff Burton; Color commentator: Steve Letarte; Guest analyst: Dale Earnhardt Jr.	Dave Burns; Mike Massaro; Marty Snider; Kelli Stavast

=== Radio ===
MRN covered the radio call for the race, which was simulcast on Sirius XM NASCAR Radio.

MRN
Booth announcers	Turn announcers	Pit reporters
Lead announcer: Joe Moore; Announcer: Jeff Striegle; Announcer: Rusty Wallace	Turns 1 & 2: Dave Moody; Backstretch: Mike Bagley; Turns 3 & 4: Kyle Rickey	Alex Hayden; Winston Kelley; Steve Post

== Standings after the race ==
Drivers' Championship standings

	Pos	Driver	Points
7	1	Joey Logano	4,000
1	2	Jimmie Johnson	4,000 (–0)
4	3	Kevin Harvick	4,000 (–0)
2	4	Matt Kenseth	4,000 (–0)
1	5	Carl Edwards	4,000 (–0)
4	6	Denny Hamlin	4,000 (–0)
2	7	Kurt Busch	4,000 (–0)
5	8	Kyle Busch	4,000 (–0)
3	9	Martin Truex Jr.	2,191 (–1,809)
1	10	Brad Keselowski	2,168 (–1,832)
2	11	Austin Dillon	2,163 (–1,837)
	12	Chase Elliott	2,156 (–1,844)
1	13	Kyle Larson	2,155 (–1,845)
1	14	Tony Stewart	2,141 (–1,859)
1	15	Jamie McMurray	2,110 (–1,890)
1	16	Chris Buescher	2,109 (–1,891)
Official driver's standings

Manufacturers' Championship standings

Pos	Manufacturer	Points
1	Toyota	1,320
2	Chevrolet	1,292 (–28)
3	Ford	1,227 (–93)
Official manufacturers' standings

- Note: Only the first 16 positions are included for the driver standings.

Previous race: 2016 Hollywood Casino 400	Sprint Cup Series; 2016 season	Next race: 2016 Goody's Fast Relief 500
