= Circle Sport – The Motorsports Group =

Circle Sport – The Motorsports Group may refer to:

- Hillman–Circle Sport
- The Motorsports Group
