= Justin Kunz =

German racing driver (born 1997)

- Born: July 11, 1997 (age 29); Appenweier, Germany

NASCAR FedEx Freight Truck Series career
- 1 race run over 1 year
- 2018 position: 81st
- Best finish: 81st (2018)
- First race: 2018 Chevrolet Silverado 250 (Mosport)
Wins	Top tens	Poles
0	0	0

NASCAR Whelen Euro Series career
- Debut season: 2016
- Current team: DF1 Racing
- Car number: 99
- Engine: Chevrolet
- Starts: 11 (Elite 1), 45 (Elite 2)
- Championships: 0
- Wins: 0
- Poles: 0
- Fastest laps: 0
- Best finish: 6th in 2017 (Elite 2)
- Finished last season: 11th in Elite 1, 9th in Elite 2
- Statistics up to date as of July 25, 2019.

Justin Kunz (born 11 July 1997, in Appenweier) is a German stock car racing driver who last competed in the NASCAR Whelen Euro Series, driving for Dexwet-df1 Racing in the No. 99 Chevrolet Camaro in the Elite 2 class. He previously competed in the NASCAR Gander Outdoors Truck Series for Jennifer Jo Cobb Racing in 2018.

== Racing career ==
=== NASCAR Camping World Truck Series ===
Kunz made his Truck Series debut in 2018, driving the No. 0 Chevrolet Silverado for Jennifer Jo Cobb Racing at Mosport. He started 30th and finished 26th, three laps down.

=== Whelen Euro Series ===
In 2016, Kunz began his racing career, driving the No. 44 Chevrolet for CAAL Racing, finishing 10th in the Elite 2 point standings. The following year, Kunz drove the No. 11 Chevrolet for PK Carsport. He finished the season in sixth in the standings with one top-five and nine top-ten finishes.

For the 2018 season, Kunz drove the No. 46 Chevrolet SS/Ford Mustang for Racing-Total, running double duty and competing in both the Elite 1 and the Elite 2 class. He finished second behind race winner Ulysse Delsaux in the first Elite 2 race at Tours Speedway to score his first podium finish in the series. He would finish the year with one podium and seven top-ten finishes to finish in ninth in the Elite 2 standings, while he would finish in eleventh in the Elite 1 standings despite not scoring any top-ten finishes throughout the year.

In 2019, Kunz switched teams again as he moved to Dexwet-df1 Racing. He would be driving solely in the Elite 2 class to partner Ellen Lohr in the No. 99 team.

== Motorsports career results ==
=== NASCAR ===
(key) (Bold – Pole position awarded by qualifying time. Italics – Pole position earned by points standings or practice time. * – Most laps led.)

==== Camping World Truck Series ====
NASCAR Camping World Truck Series results
Year	Team	No.	Make	1	2	3	4	5	6	7	8	9	10	11	12	13	14	15	16	17	18	19	20	21	22	23	NCWTC	Pts
2018	JJC Racing	0	Chevy	DAY	ATL	LVS	MAR	DOV	KAN	CLT	TEX	IOW	GTW	CHI	KEN	ELD	POC	MCH	BRI	MSP; 26	LVS	TAL	MAR	TEX	PHO	HOM	81st	11

==== Whelen Euro Series – Elite 1 ====
NASCAR Whelen Euro Series – Elite 1 results
Year	Team	No.	Make	1	2	3	4	5	6	7	8	9	10	11	12	NWES	Pts
2018	Racing Total	46	Chevy	VAL; 22	VAL; 30	FRA; 13	FRA; 12									11th	339
2018	Racing Total	46	Ford					BRH; 13^	BRH; 14	TOU; 13	TOU; DNS	HOC; 14	HOC; 15	ZOL; 15	ZOL; 21	11th	339

==== Whelen Euro Series – Elite 2 ====
NASCAR Whelen Euro Series – Elite 2 results
Year	Team	No.	Make	1	2	3	4	5	6	7	8	9	10	11	12	13	NWES	Pts
2016	CAAL Racing	44	Chevy	VAL; 12	VAL; 17	VEN; 18	VEN; DNS	BRH; 14	BRH; 13	TOU; 10	TOU; 11	ADR; 8	ADR; 5	ZOL; 20	ZOL; 7		10th	491
2017	PK Carsport	11	Chevy	VAL; 7	VAL; 6	BRH; 14	BRH; 12	VEN; 9	VEN; 9	HOC; 6	HOC; 14	FRA; 9	FRA; 9	ZOL; 4	ZOL; 10		6th	539
2018	Racing Total	46	Chevy	VAL; 13	VAL; 28	FRA; 8	FRA; 7										9th	385
2018	Racing Total	46	Ford					BRH; 28	BRH; 11^	TOU; 2	TOU; 16	HOC; 7	HOC; 8	ZOL; 20	ZOL; 11		9th	385
2019	Dexwet-df1 Racing	99	Chevy	VAL; 22	VAL; 9	FRA; 4	FRA; 7	BRH; 8	BRH; 14	MOS; 5	MOS; 10	VEN; 11	HOC; DNS	HOC; 21	ZOL; 5	ZOL; 11	9th	288
