= 2023 GT2 European Series =

The 2023 Fanatec GT2 European Series is the third season of the GT2 European Series. The season began on 21 April at Autodromo Nazionale Monza in Monza and ended on 7 October at Circuit Paul Ricard in Le Castellet.

== Calendar ==
For 2023 the opening round of the season was moved back to Monza, after having been to Imola for the 2022 season. The series will also be heading to Dijon and Portimão for the first time, while not returning to Spa or Misano.

Round	Circuit	Date	Supporting
1	Autodromo Nazionale di Monza, Monza, Italy	21–23 April	GT World Challenge Europe Endurance Cup
2	Red Bull Ring, Spielberg, Austria	26–27 May	Histo-Cup Austria
3	Circuit de Dijon-Prenois, Prenois, France	16–17 June	FFSA GT Championship
4	Algarve International Circuit, Portimão, Portugal	22–23 July	British GT Championship
5	Circuit Ricardo Tormo, Cheste, Spain	15–17 September	GT World Challenge Europe Sprint Cup
6	Circuit Paul Ricard, Le Castellet, France	6–7 October	FFSA GT Championship

== Series news ==
- This season sees the introduction of the Iron Cup, awarded to the top Pro-Am or Am entry of drivers with a combined age of over 100 years.
- The minimum driver age requirement got removed, allowing for drivers younger than 40 years to compete.

== Entry list ==
Team	Car	No.	Drivers	Class	Rounds
(Belgium) PK Carsport	Audi R8 LMS GT2	1	(Belgium) Stienes Longin	PA	All
(Belgium) PK Carsport	Audi R8 LMS GT2	1	(Belgium) Peter Guelinckx	PA	All
(Italy) Ebimotors	Porsche 911 GT2 RS Clubsport	5	(Lithuania) Aurelijus Rusteika	Am	1–3, 5–6
(Italy) Ebimotors	Porsche 911 GT2 RS Clubsport	5	(Lithuania) Mantas Janavicius	Am	1–3, 5–6
(Italy) Ebimotors	Porsche 911 GT2 RS Clubsport	911	(Switzerland) Leonardo Gorini	Am	1–5
(Italy) Ebimotors	Porsche 911 GT2 RS Clubsport	911	(France) Nicolas Gomar	Am	2
(Italy) Ebimotors	Porsche 911 GT2 RS Clubsport	911	(France) Bastien Chesaux	Am	3
(Germany) Haupt Racing Team	Mercedes-AMG GT2	7	(Germany) Jörg Viebahn	Am	2
(Germany) Haupt Racing Team	Mercedes-AMG GT2	7	(Germany) Mario Plachutta	Am	2
(Germany) Fanatec by HRT	Mercedes-AMG GT2	44	(Germany) Jens Liebhauser	Am	1
(Germany) Fanatec by HRT	Mercedes-AMG GT2	44	(Germany) Thomas Jackermeier	Am	1
(Italy) Iron Lynx	Lamborghini Huracán Super Trofeo GT2	8	(Italy) Donovan Privitelio	Am	1
(Italy) Iron Lynx	Lamborghini Huracán Super Trofeo GT2	8	(Italy) Luciano Privitelio	Am	1
(Germany) Manthey Racing	Porsche 911 GT2 RS Clubsport	10	(Germany) Christoph Breuer	Am	1
(Germany) Manthey Racing	Porsche 911 GT2 RS Clubsport	10	(Germany) Christoph Breuer	PA	3
(Germany) Manthey Racing	Porsche 911 GT2 RS Clubsport	10	(Austria) Marco Holzer	PA	3
(Italy) LP Racing	Maserati MC20 GT2	12	(Switzerland) Leonardo Gorini	PA	6
(Italy) LP Racing	Maserati MC20 GT2	12	(Italy) Luca Pirri	PA	6
(Italy) LP Racing	Audi R8 LMS GT2	18	(Germany) Pierre Kaffer	PA	1–4, 6
(Italy) LP Racing	Audi R8 LMS GT2	18	(Austria) Michael Doppelmayr	PA	1–4, 6
(Italy) LP Racing	Audi R8 LMS GT2	67	(France) Henry Hassid	PA	All
(Italy) LP Racing	Audi R8 LMS GT2	67	(France) Anthony Beltoise	PA	All
(Italy) LP Racing	Audi R8 LMS GT2	88	(France) Stéphane Ratel	PA	All
(Italy) LP Racing	Audi R8 LMS GT2	88	(Italy) Mattia di Giusto	PA	All
(Austria) KTM True Racing by Reiter Engineering	KTM X-Bow GT2	15	(Belgium) Nicolas Saelens	PA	All
(Austria) KTM True Racing by Reiter Engineering	KTM X-Bow GT2	15	(Slovakia) Štefan Rosina	PA	All
(Austria) KTM True Racing by Reiter Engineering	KTM X-Bow GT2	16	(Austria) Klaus Angerhofer	Am	All
(Austria) KTM True Racing by Reiter Engineering	KTM X-Bow GT2	16	(Austria) Sehdi Sarmini	Am	2–6
(Austria) KTM True Racing by Reiter Engineering	KTM X-Bow GT2	17	(Austria) Reinhard Kofler	PA	1–4
(Austria) KTM True Racing by Reiter Engineering	KTM X-Bow GT2	17	(Austria) Hubert Trunkenpolz	PA	1–2, 4–6
(Austria) KTM True Racing by Reiter Engineering	KTM X-Bow GT2	17	(Switzerland) Martin Koch	PA	3
(Austria) KTM True Racing by Reiter Engineering	KTM X-Bow GT2	17	(Spain) Dani Pedrosa	PA	5
(Austria) KTM True Racing by Reiter Engineering	KTM X-Bow GT2	17	(Austria) Laura Kraihamer	PA	6
(Austria) KTM True Racing by Reiter Engineering	KTM X-Bow GT2	51	(France) Alexandre Leroy	Am	6
(Austria) KTM True Racing by Reiter Engineering	KTM X-Bow GT2	51	(France) Bertrand Rouchaud	Am	6
(France) CMR	Lamborghini Huracán Super Trofeo GT2	30	(France) Georges Cabanne	Am	3, 6
(France) CMR	Lamborghini Huracán Super Trofeo GT2	30	(France) Jean Paul Buffin	Am	6
(France) Akkodis ASP Team	Mercedes-AMG GT2	61	(France) Mauro Ricci	Am	2–6
(France) Akkodis ASP Team	Mercedes-AMG GT2	61	(France) Benjamin Ricci	Am	2–6
(France) Akkodis ASP Team	Mercedes-AMG GT2	87	(France) Jean-Luc Beaubelique	Am	4
(France) Akkodis ASP Team	Mercedes-AMG GT2	87	(France) Christophe Bourret	Am	4
(France) Akkodis ASP Team	Mercedes-AMG GT2	87	(France) Ludovic Badey	PA	5–6
(France) Akkodis ASP Team	Mercedes-AMG GT2	87	(France) Jean-Luc Beaubelique	PA	5–6
(Czech Republic) RTR Projects	KTM X-Bow GT2	89	(Czech Republic) Jan Krabec	Am	All
(Austria) MZR Motorsportzentrum Ried	KTM X-Bow GT2	812	(Austria) Reinhard Kofler	PA	5–6
(Austria) MZR Motorsportzentrum Ried	KTM X-Bow GT2	812	(Switzerland) Martin Koch	PA	5–6
(Spain) NM Racing Team	Mercedes-AMG GT2	888	(Czech Republic) Jakub Knoll	Am	6
(Spain) NM Racing Team	Mercedes-AMG GT2	888	(France) Stéphane Perrin	Am	6

Icon	Class
PA	Pro-Am Cup
Am	Am Cup
INV	Invitational

== Race results ==
Bold indicates overall winner

Round		Circuit	Pole position	Pro-Am Winners	Am Winners
1	R1	(Italy) Monza	(Italy) No. 8 Iron Lynx	**(Italy) No. 67 LP Racing**	(Czech Republic) No. 89 RTR Projects
1	R1	(Italy) Monza	(Italy) Donovan Privitelio (Italy) Luciano Privitelio	**(France) Henry Hassid** **(France) Anthony Beltoise**	(Czech Republic) Jan Krabec
1	R2	(Italy) Monza	(Belgium) No. 1 PK Carsport	**(Belgium) No. 1 PK Carsport**	(Czech Republic) No. 89 RTR Projects
1	R2	(Italy) Monza	(Belgium) Stienes Longin (Belgium) Peter Guelinckx	**(Belgium) Stienes Longin** **(Belgium) Peter Guelinckx**	(Czech Republic) Jan Krabec
2	R1	(Austria) Red Bull Ring	(Italy) No. 67 LP Racing	**(France) No. 61 Akkodis ASP Team**	(Austria) No. 16 True Racing by Reiter Engineering
2	R1	(Austria) Red Bull Ring	(France) Henry Hassid (France) Anthony Beltoise	**(France) Mauro Ricci** **(France) Benjamin Ricci**	(Austria) Klaus Angerhofer (Austria) Sehdi Sarmini
2	R2	(Austria) Red Bull Ring	(Italy) No. 18 LP Racing	(Austria) **No. 15 True Racing by Reiter Engineering**	(Czech Republic) No. 89 RTR Projects
2	R2	(Austria) Red Bull Ring	(Germany) Pierre Kaffer (Austria) Michael Doppelmayr	(Belgium) **Nicolas Saelens** **(Slovakia) Štefan Rosina**	(Czech Republic) Jan Krabec
3	R1	(France) Dijon	(Italy) No. 67 LP Racing	**(Austria) No. 17 True Racing by Reiter Engineering**	(Italy) No. 911 Ebimotors
3	R1	(France) Dijon	(France) Henry Hassid (France) Anthony Beltoise	**(Switzerland) Martin Koch** **(Austria) Reinhard Kofler**	(Switzerland) Leonardo Gorini
3	R2	(France) Dijon	(Italy) No. 18 LP Racing	**(Belgium) No. 1 PK Carsport**	(Czech Republic) No. 89 RTR Projects
3	R2	(France) Dijon	(Germany) Pierre Kaffer (Austria) Michael Doppelmayr	**(Belgium) Stienes Longin** **(Belgium) Peter Guelinckx**	(Czech Republic) Jan Krabec
4	R1	(Portugal) Algarve	(Belgium) No. 1 PK Carsport	**(Italy) No. 67 LP Racing**	(Austria) No. 16 True Racing by Reiter Engineering
4	R1	(Portugal) Algarve	(Belgium) Stienes Longin (Belgium) Peter Guelinckx	**(France) Henry Hassid** **(France) Anthony Beltoise**	(Austria) Klaus Angerhofer (Austria) Sehdi Sarmini
4	R2	(Portugal) Algarve	(Italy) No. 18 LP Racing	**(Belgium) No. 1 PK Carsport**	(Czech Republic) No. 89 RTR Projects
4	R2	(Portugal) Algarve	(Germany) Pierre Kaffer (Austria) Michael Doppelmayr	**(Belgium) Stienes Longin** **(Belgium) Peter Guelinckx**	(Czech Republic) Jan Krabec
5	R1	(Spain) Valencia	(Italy) No. 67 LP Racing	**(France) No. 87 Akkodis ASP Team**	(Austria) No. 16 True Racing by Reiter Engineering
5	R1	(Spain) Valencia	(France) Henry Hassid (France) Anthony Beltoise	**(France) Jean-Luc Beaubelique** **(France) Ludovic Badey**	(Austria) Klaus Angerhofer (Austria) Sehdi Sarmini
5	R2	(Spain) Valencia	(Italy) No. 67 LP Racing	**(Belgium) No. 1 PK Carsport**	(Italy) Ebimotors
5	R2	(Spain) Valencia	(France) Henry Hassid (France) Anthony Beltoise	**(Belgium) Stienes Longin** **(Belgium) Peter Guelinckx**	(Lithuania) Aurelijus Rusteika (Lithuania) Mantas Janavicius
6	R1	(France) Paul Ricard	(Italy) No. 12 LP Racing	**(France) No. 87 Akkodis ASP Team**	(Czech Republic) No. 89 RTR Projects
6	R1	(France) Paul Ricard	(Switzerland) Leonardo Gorini (Italy) Luca Pirri	**(France) Jean-Luc Beaubelique** **(France) Ludovic Badey**	(Czech Republic) Jan Krabec
6	R2	(France) Paul Ricard	(Austria) No. 812 MZR Motorsportzentrum-Ried	**(Austria) No. 812 MZR Motorsportzentrum-Ried**	(Czech Republic) No. 89 RTR Projects
6	R2	(France) Paul Ricard	(Austria) Reinhard Kofler (Switzerland) Martin Koch	**(Austria) Reinhard Kofler** **(Switzerland) Martin Koch**	(Czech Republic) Jan Krabec

== Championship standings ==
Scoring system

Championship points are awarded for the first ten positions in each race. Entries are required to complete 75% of the winning car's race distance in order to be classified and earn points.

Position	**1st**	**2nd**	**3rd**	**4th**	**5th**	**6th**	**7th**	**8th**	**9th**	**10th**	**Pole**
Points	25	18	15	12	10	8	6	4	2	1	1

=== Drivers' championships ===
Pos.	Driver	Team	MON (Italy)		RBR (Austria)		DIJ (France)		POR (Portugal)		VAL (Spain)		LEC (France)		Points
Pro-Am
1	(France) Henry Hassid (France) Anthony Beltoise	(Italy) LP Racing	1	2	**8**	3	**Ret**	4	1	2	**2**	**8**	5	4	174
2	(Austria) Reinhard Kofler	(Austria) True Racing by Reiter Engineering	7	11	3	6	1	2	9	5	10	3	3	**1**	173
3	(Belgium) Peter Guelinckx (Belgium) Stienes Longin	(Belgium) PK Carsport	**Ret**	**1**	7	2	Ret	1	**10**	1	5	1	8	5	165
4	(Slovakia) Štefan Rosina	(Austria) True Racing by Reiter Engineering	4	8	2	1	3	6	6	3	4	Ret	4	2	165
5	(Belgium) Nicolas Saelens	(Austria) True Racing by Reiter Engineering	4	8	2	1	3	6	6	3	4	Ret			132
6	(France) Mauro Ricci (France) Benjamin Ricci	(France) Akkodis ASP Team			1	4	2	9	4	10	3	6	6	8	122
7	(France) Stéphane Ratel (Italy) Mattia di Giusto	(Italy) LP Racing	3	Ret	11	7	6	8	2	6	6	5	9	6	110
8	(Switzerland) Martin Koch	(Austria) True Racing by Reiter Engineering					1	2			10	3	3	**1**	108
9	(Germany) Pierre Kaffer (Austria) Michael Doppelmayr	(Italy) LP Racing	6	6	4	**8**	4	**12**	3	**11**			13	14	93
10	(France) Jean-Luc Beaubelique (France) Ludovic Badey	(France) Akkodis ASP Team									1	2	1	3	83
11	(Austria) Hubert Trunkenpolz	(Austria) True Racing by Reiter Engineering	7	11	3	6			9	5	11	7			77
12	(Germany) Christoph Breuer (Austria) Marco Holzer	(Germany) Manthey-Racing					5	3							25
13	(Spain) Dani Pedrosa	(Austria) True Racing by Reiter Engineering									11	7			12
**Guest Entries Ineligible to Score Points**
-	(Switzerland) Leonardo Gorini (Italy) Luca Pirri	(Italy) LP Racing											**2**	7	0
-	(France) Gilles Vannelet	(Austria) True Racing by Reiter Engineering											4	2	0
Am
1	(Czech Republic) Jan Krabec	(Czech Republic) RTR Projects	2	3	Ret	**5**	8	5	**Ret**	4	8	**10**	**7**	**9**	231
2	(Austria) Klaus Angerhofer	(Austria) True Racing by Reiter Engineering	10	4	**5**	9	10	10	5	**9**	7	9	11	11	216
3	(Austria) Sehdi Sarmini	(Austria) True Racing by Reiter Engineering			**5**	9	10	10	5	**9**	7	9	11	11	188
4	(Switzerland) Leonardo Gorini	(Italy) Ebimotors	5	DNS	6	12	**7**	**7**	7	7	9	11			154
5	(Lithuania) Aurelijus Rusteika (Lithuania) Mantas Janavicius	(Italy) Ebimotors	8	9	10	11	9	11			**Ret**	4	12	12	132
6	(France) Georges Cabanne	(France) CMR					11	13					15	15	44
7	(Germany) Jörg Viebahn (Austria) Mario Plachutta	(Germany) Haupt Racing Team			9	10									30
8	(France) Jean-Luc Beaubelique (France) Christophe Bourret	(France) Akkodis ASP Team							8	8					30
9	(France) Nicolas Gomar	(Italy) Ebimotors			6	12									28
10	(Germany) Jens Liebhauser (Germany) Thomas Jackermeier	(Germany) Fanatec by HRT	9	**7**											25
11	(Germany) Christoph Breuer	(Germany) Manthey-Racing	Ret	5											15
12	(Italy) Donovan Privitelio (Italy) Luciano Privitelio	(Italy) Iron Lynx	**Ret**	10											9
**Guest Entries Ineligible to Score Points**
-	(Czech Republic) Jakub Knoll (France) Stéphane Perrin	(Spain) NM Racing Team											10	10	0
-	(France) Alexandre Leroy (France) Bertrand Rouchaud	(Austria) True Racing by Reiter Engineering											14	13	0
-	(France) Jean Paul Buffin	(France) CMR											15	15	0
Pos.	Driver	Team	MON (Italy)		RBR (Austria)		DIJ (France)		POR (Portugal)		VAL (Spain)		LEC (France)		Points

Colour	Result
Gold	Winner
Silver	Second place
Bronze	Third place
Green	Points classification
Blue	Non-points classification
Blue	Non-classified finish (NC)
Purple	Retired, not classified (Ret)
Red	Did not qualify (DNQ)
Red	Did not pre-qualify (DNPQ)
Black	Disqualified (DSQ)
White	Did not start (DNS)
White	Withdrew (WD)
White	Race cancelled (C)
Blank	Did not practice (DNP)
Blank	Did not arrive (DNA)
Blank	Excluded (EX)

- **Bold** - Pole position
- Italics - Fastest lap

Notes:

- † – Entry did not finish the race but was classified, as it completed more than 75% of the race distance.
