= 2018 NASCAR Whelen Euro Series =

Locations of the European racing circuits

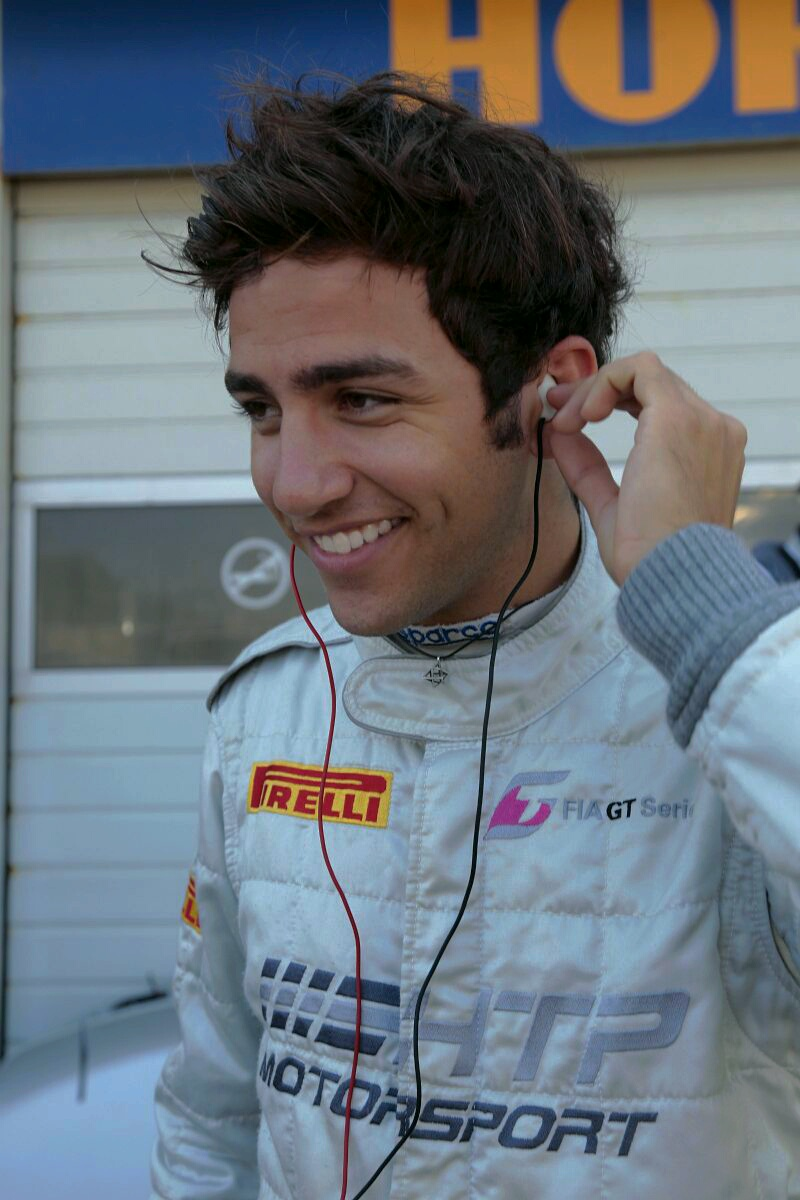
Alon Day (pictured in 2013) successfully defended the Elite 1 title in 2018.

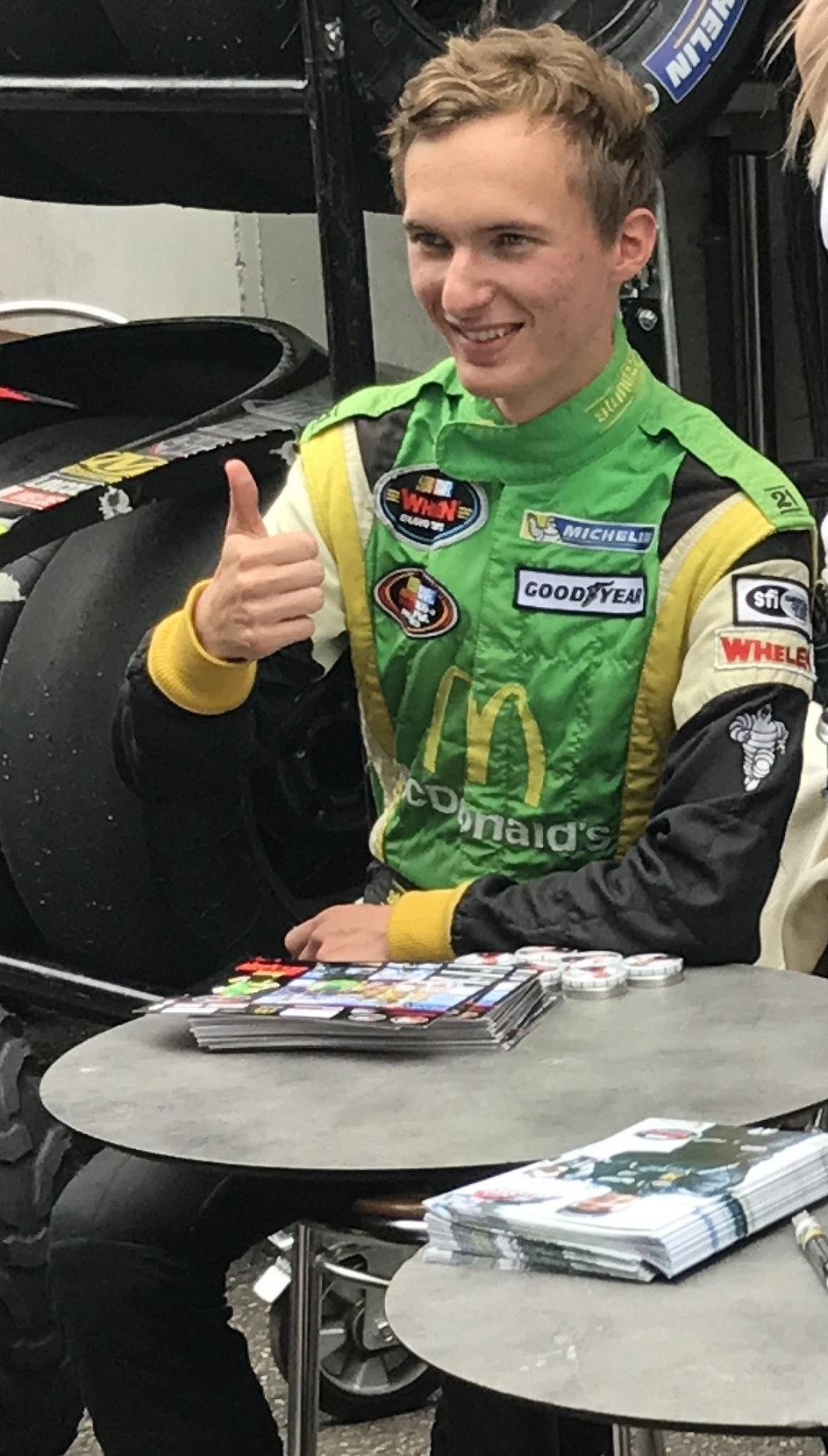
Ulysse Delsaux (pictured in 2017) won the Elite 2 title in 2018.

The 2018 NASCAR Whelen Euro Series was the tenth Racecar Euro Series season, and the sixth under the NASCAR Whelen Euro Series branding. The season consisted of six meetings – with two races at each meeting – starting on 14 April at Circuit Ricardo Tormo in Valencia, and ending on 21 October at Circuit Zolder in Belgium. Alon Day and Thomas Ferrando entered the season as the defending champion in Elite 1 and Elite 2 respectively.

In the Elite 1 class, Alon Day successfully defended his Elite 1 title, winning the championship by 28 points over Frédéric Gabillon. In the Elite 2 class, Ulysse Delsaux scored his first NASCAR Euro Series title, ahead of Go Fas Racing's Florian Venturi by six points. RDV Compétition won the team's championship title, while Toyota won their first Euro Series manufacturer's title.

== Teams and drivers ==
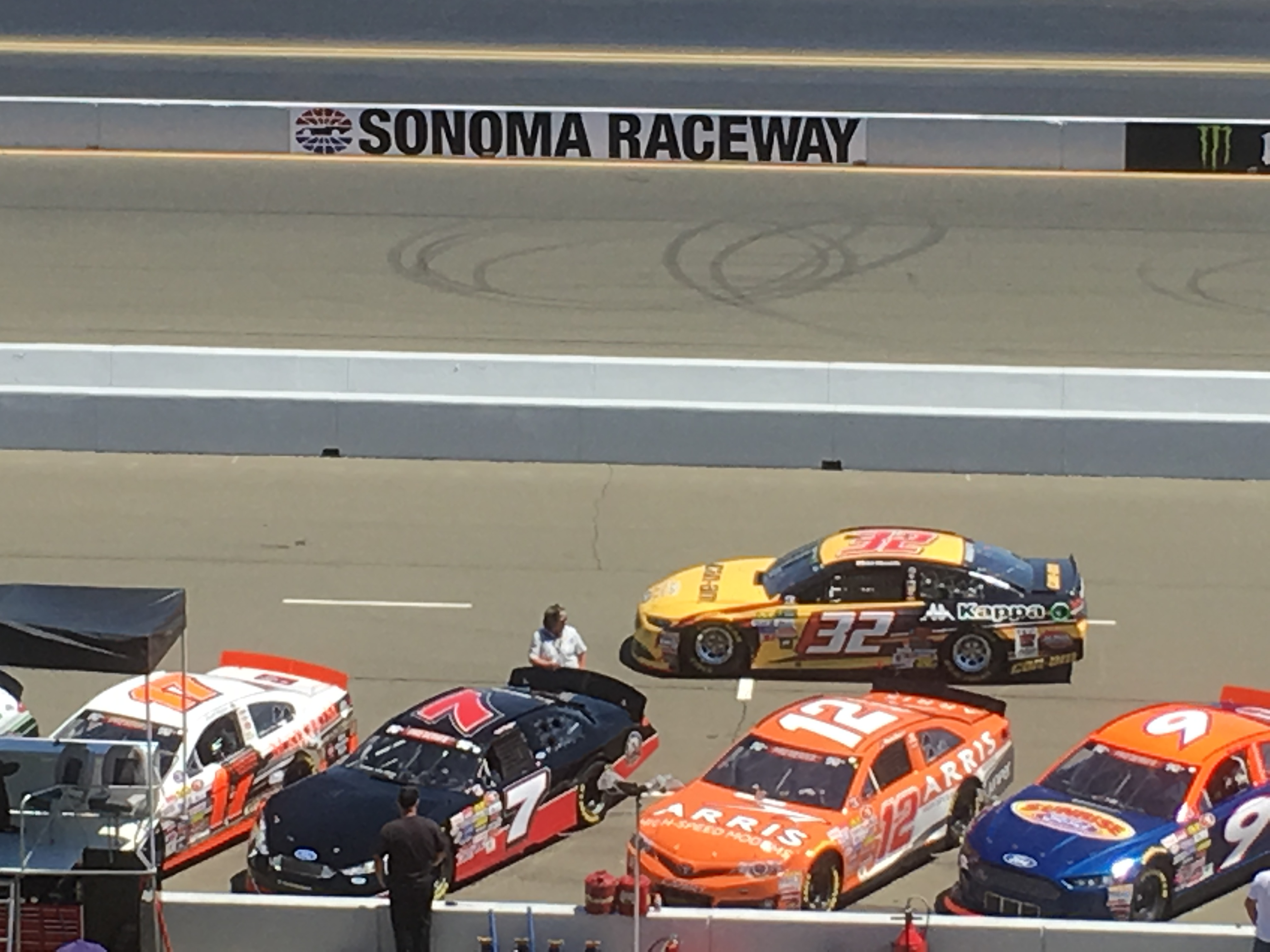
Cup Series team Go Fas Racing (shown here with Matt DiBenedetto in the team's No. 32 Cup car at Sonoma in 2017) entered the series.

NASCAR released the entry list for the teams participating on 15 March 2018.

=== Elite 1 Division ===
Manufacturer	Car	Team	No.	Race Driver	Rounds
Chevrolet	SS	(Germany) Racing Total	10	(Spain) Miguel Angel Dasi	1–4
Chevrolet	SS	(Germany) Racing Total	10	(Brazil) William Ayer, Jr.	6 (Note: For the second race at Zolder, the 10 team uses a Chevrolet Camaro body instead of a Chevrolet SS body.)
Chevrolet	SS	(France) Pegasus Racing	29	(France) Julien Schell	1–3
Chevrolet	SS	(Germany) Mishumotors	33	(France) Lucas Lasserre	All
Chevrolet	SS	(Germany) Mishumotors	70	(Germany) Dominik Farnbacher	5
Chevrolet	SS	(Germany) Mishumotors	70	(United States) Dale Quarterley	6
Chevrolet	Camaro 3 SS 3	(Belgium) PK Carsport	11	(Belgium) Stienes Longin	All
Chevrolet	Camaro 4 SS 2	(Belgium) PK Carsport	24	(Belgium) Anthony Kumpen	1–4
Chevrolet	Camaro 4 SS 2	(Belgium) PK Carsport	24	(Belgium) Bert Longin	5
Chevrolet	Camaro 4 SS 2	(Belgium) PK Carsport	24	(Belgium) Koen Wauters	6
Chevrolet	Camaro 4 SS 2	(Belgium) Braxx Racing	91	(Belgium) Marc Goossens	All (Note: For the second race at Franciacorta, the 91 team uses a Chevrolet Camaro body instead of a Chevrolet SS body.)
Chevrolet	Camaro 2 SS 2	(Austria) Dexwet DF1 Racing	66	(France) Christophe Bouchut	1–3, 6
Chevrolet	Camaro 3 SS 3	(Sweden) Memphis Racing	77	(Sweden) Alexander Graff	All (Note: At Brands Hatch, the team originally entered a SS chassis, but the chassis was damaged following a collision between the team's Elite 1 driver Alexander Graff and Romain Iannetta at Elite 1 race 1. The team then swapped to a Camaro chassis between Elite 1 Race 1 and Elite 2 Race 1.)
Ford	Mustang	(Austria) Renauer Motorsport	5	(Czech Republic) Martin Doubek	1
Ford	Mustang	(Italy) Racers Motorsport	8	(Italy) Dario Caso	All
Ford	Mustang	(Italy) Racers Motorsport	9	(Italy) Gianmarco Ercoli	All
Ford	Mustang	(Italy) BVR Motorsport	27	(Italy) Angelo Rogari	1–4
Ford	Mustang	(United States) Go Fas Racing	32	(France) Romain Iannetta	All
Ford	Mustang	(France) Knauf Racing	37	(France) Thomas Ferrando	All
Ford	Mustang	(France) Knauf Racing	73	(France) Wilfried Boucenna	All
Ford	Mustang	(Italy) MRT by Nocentini	40	(Brazil) Marconi Abreu	1
Ford	Mustang	(Italy) MRT by Nocentini	47	(Brazil) Marconi Abreu	2
Ford	Mustang	(Italy) MRT by Nocentini	47	(Italy) Renzo Calcinati	5
Ford	Mustang	(Italy) MRT by Nocentini	58	(United Kingdom) Alex Sedgwick	1
Ford	Mustang	(Netherlands) Hendriks Motorsport	50	(Netherlands) Loris Hezemans	All
Ford	Mustang	(France) RDV Compétition	51	(France) Didier Bec	3, 5
Ford	Mustang	(Belgium) Braxx Racing	78	(Belgium) Jerry de Weerdt	1–5
Ford	Mustang	(Belgium) Braxx Racing	78	(Belgium) Dylan Derdaele	6
Toyota	Camry	(Monaco) Alex Caffi Motorsport	2	(Japan) Kenko Miura	All
Toyota	Camry	(France) RDV Compétition	3	(France) Frédéric Gabillon	All
Toyota	Camry	(France) RDV Compétition	04	(Canada) Jean-François Dumoulin	6
Toyota	Camry	(France) RDV Compétition	18	(United States) Bobby Labonte	All
Ford 3 Chevrolet 2	Mustang; Camry	(Monaco) Alex Caffi Motorsport	1	(Spain) Borja García	1
Ford 3 Chevrolet 2	Mustang; Camry	(Monaco) Alex Caffi Motorsport	1	(Italy) Alex Caffi	2
Ford 3 Chevrolet 2	Mustang; Camry	(Monaco) Alex Caffi Motorsport	1	(Belgium) Bert Longin	3
Ford 3 Chevrolet 2	Mustang; Camry	(Monaco) Alex Caffi Motorsport	1	(Finland) Henri Tuomaala	5-6
Chevrolet 3 Ford 2	SS; Mustang	Belgium Driver Academy	7	(Czech Republic) Martin Doubek	2–6
Chevrolet 2 Ford 4	SS; Mustang	(Germany) Racing Total	46	(Germany) Justin Kunz	All
Chevrolet 4 Ford 2	Camaro; Mustang	(Italy) Solaris Motorsports	12	(Italy) Francesco Sini	All
Chevrolet 3 Ford 3	Camaro; Mustang	(Switzerland) Race Art - Blu Mot	31	(Switzerland) Mauro Trione	All (Note: At Brands Hatch, the team originally entered a Ford Mustang chassis, but the Mustang chassis was then damaged in an incident during the first race of the Elite 1 class. The team then switched to a Camaro chassis for Elite 2.)
Chevrolet 2 Ford 2	Camaro; Mustang	(Italy) The Club Motorsports	41	(Italy) Davide Di Benedetto	1
Chevrolet 2 Ford 2	Camaro; Mustang	(Italy) The Club Motorsports	41	(Italy) Fabrizio Armetta	2, 6
Chevrolet 2 Ford 2	Camaro; Mustang	(Italy) The Club Motorsports	41	(Italy) Max Lanza	3 (Note: At Brands Hatch, the team originally entered a Ford Mustang chassis, but the team swapped to a Camaro chassis before the race.)
Chevrolet 2 Ford 2	Camaro; Mustang	(Belgium) Braxx Racing	90	(United Kingdom) Alex Sedgwick	3–6
Chevrolet 3 Toyota 3	SS; Camry	(Italy) CAAL Racing	44	(Germany) Matthias Hauer	All
Chevrolet 2 Toyota 4	SS; Camry	(Italy) CAAL Racing	54	(Israel) Alon Day	All
Chevrolet 3 Toyota 2	SS; Camry	(Italy) CAAL Racing	56	(Spain) Salvador Tineo Arroyo	1, 5
Chevrolet 3 Toyota 2	SS; Camry	(Italy) CAAL Racing	56	(Italy) Alex Ciompi	2
Chevrolet 3 Toyota 2	SS; Camry	(Italy) CAAL Racing	56	(Italy) Nicolò Rocca	3, 6

=== Elite 2 Division ===
Manufacturer	Car	Team	No.	Race Driver	Rounds
Chevrolet	Camaro	(Italy) Solaris Motorsports	12	(Italy) Francesco Sini	3
Chevrolet	Camaro	(Austria) Dexwet DF1 Racing	66	(Austria) Clemens Sparowitz	3, 5 (Note: At Brands Hatch, Sparowitz was entered and practiced in car #99, while Deodhar originally entered and practiced in car #66. Both drivers swapped cars before the qualifying session.)
Chevrolet	SS	(Germany) Racing Total	10	(United States) Jennifer Jo Cobb	1
Chevrolet	SS	(Germany) Racing Total	10	(Germany) Marko Stipp	3
Chevrolet	SS	(Germany) Racing Total	10	(United Kingdom) Stephen Young	4
Chevrolet	SS	(Germany) Racing Total	10	(Spain) Carmen Boix Gil	5
Chevrolet	SS	(Germany) Racing Total	10	(Belgium) Diederik Ceyssens	6
Chevrolet	SS	(France) Pegasus Racing	29	(France) Claude Jean Diebolt	1
Chevrolet	SS	(France) Pegasus Racing	29	(France) Julien Schell	2–3
Chevrolet	SS	(Germany) Mishumotors	33	(France) Eric Quintal	1–2
Chevrolet	SS	(Germany) Mishumotors	33	(Sweden) Freddy Nordström	3
Chevrolet	SS	(Germany) Mishumotors	33	(Spain) Carmen Boix Gil	4
Chevrolet	SS	(Germany) Mishumotors	33	(Finland) Ian Eric Wadén	5
Chevrolet	SS	(Germany) Mishumotors	70	(Germany) Mirco Schultis	5-6
Chevrolet	Camaro 3 SS 3	(Belgium) PK Carsport	11	(Brazil) Felipe Rabello	All
Chevrolet	Camaro 3 SS 2	(Belgium) PK Carsport	24	(Belgium) Guillaume Dumarey	1–4, 6
Chevrolet	Camaro 3 SS 2	(Belgium) PK Carsport	24	(Belgium) Pol Van Pollaert	5
Chevrolet	Camaro 4 SS 2	(Sweden) Memphis Racing	77	(Belgium) Guillaume Deflandre	All
Chevrolet	Camaro 4 SS 2	(Belgium) Braxx Racing	91	(Belgium) Tom Boonen	All
Ford	Mustang	(Austria) Renauer Motorsport	5	(Belgium) Maxime Pampel	1
Ford	Mustang	(Italy) Racers Motorsport	8	(Italy) Nicholas Risitano	All
Ford	Mustang	(Italy) Racers Motorsport	9	(Italy) Fillipo Vita	1
Ford	Mustang	(Italy) Racers Motorsport	9	(Italy) Simone Laureti	2–6
Ford	Mustang	(Italy) BVR Motorsport	27	(Italy) Pierluigi Veronesi	All
Ford	Mustang	(United States) Go Fas Racing	32	(France) Florian Venturi	All
Ford	Mustang	(France) Knauf Racing	37	(France) Wilfired Boucenna	All
Ford	Mustang	(France) Knauf Racing	73	(France) Paul Guiod	All
Ford	Mustang	(Italy) MRT by Nocentini	40	(Brazil) Marconi Abreu	1
Ford	Mustang	(Italy) MRT by Nocentini	47	(Brazil) Marconi Abreu	2
Ford	Mustang	(Italy) MRT by Nocentini	47	(Italy) Renzo Calcinati	5
Ford	Mustang	(Italy) MRT by Nocentini	58	(Spain) Julio Carayol Casas	1
Ford	Mustang	(Italy) MRT by Nocentini	58	(United Kingdom) Alex Sedgwick	2
Ford	Mustang	(Netherlands) Hendriks Motorsport	50	(Belgium) Diederik Ceyssens	1–4
Ford	Mustang	(France) RDV Compétition	51	(France) Hugo Bec	3, 5
Ford	Mustang	(Belgium) Braxx Racing	78	(Belgium) Jerry de Weerdt	All
Toyota	Camry	(Monaco) Alex Caffi Motorsport	2	(Japan) Kenko Miura	1, 3–6
Toyota	Camry	(Monaco) Alex Caffi Motorsport	2	(Italy) Denny Zardo	2
Toyota	Camry	(France) RDV Compétition	3	(France) Ulysse Delsaux	All
Toyota	Camry	(France) RDV Compétition	04	(Canada) Jean-François Dumoulin	6
Toyota	Camry	(France) RDV Compétition	18	(France) Adrien Paviot	4
Ford 3 Chevrolet 2	Mustang; Camry	(Monaco) Alex Caffi Motorsport	1	(Spain) Carmen Boix Gil	1–3, 6
Ford 3 Chevrolet 2	Mustang; Camry	(Monaco) Alex Caffi Motorsport	1	(Finland) Jesse Vartiainen	5
Chevrolet 3 Ford 2	SS; Mustang	Belgium Driver Academy	7	(Belgium) Maxime Pampel	2–6
Chevrolet 2 Ford 4	SS; Mustang	(Germany) Racing Total	46	(Germany) Justin Kunz	All
Chevrolet 4 Ford 2	Camaro; Mustang	(Switzerland) Race Art - Blu Mot	31	(Switzerland) Francesco Parli	All
Chevrolet 2 Ford 3	Camaro; Mustang	(Italy) The Club Motorsports	41	(Italy) Max Lanza	1–3, 5-6
Chevrolet 2 Ford 4	Camaro; Mustang	(Belgium) Braxx Racing	90	(Belgium) Pedro Bonnet	All
Chevrolet 1 Ford 1	Camaro; Mustang	(Austria) Dexwet DF1 Racing	99	(India) Advait Deodhar	3, 5
Chevrolet 3 Toyota 3	SS; Camry	(Italy) CAAL Racing	44	(Luxembourg) Gil Linster	All
Chevrolet 2 Toyota 4	SS; Camry	(Italy) CAAL Racing	54	(Italy) Arianna Casoli	All
Chevrolet 4 Toyota 2	SS; Camry	(Italy) CAAL Racing	56	(Poland) Maciej Dreszer	1–4, 6
Chevrolet 4 Toyota 2	SS; Camry	(Italy) CAAL Racing	56	(Germany) Thomas Fritsch	5

==== Driver changes ====
- Romain Iannetta will return to the series after a two-year absence, with him joining Go Fas Racing as their Elite 1 driver for this season.
- French F4 Championship driver Florian Venturi will make his debut in the series, joining Go Fas Racing as their Elite 2 driver for this season.
- Felipe Rabello switches team from CAAL Racing to PK Carsport, replacing Justin Kunz who switched to competing in both divisions with Racing Total.
- Maciej Dreszer switches team from DF1 Racing to CAAL Racing. In addition, German driver Matthias Hauer will make his series debut, replacing Swedish driver Freddy Nordström as the Elite 1 driver of the No. 44 car.
- Truck Series driver Jennifer Jo Cobb will make her debut in the series, with her driving the No. 10 car of Racing Total.
- Both Loris Hezemans and Diederik Ceyssens will make their series debut driving the No. 50 Hendriks Motorsport Ford Mustang, driving in Elite 1 and Elite 2 respectively.
- Swiss drivers Mauro Trione and Francesco Parli will make their series debut driving the No. 31 Race Art Technology Ford Mustang, driving in Elite 1 and Elite 2 respectively.
- Lucas Lasserre will make his full-time debut in the series after participating part-time last season with Mishumotors. His teammates Eric Quintal and Advait Deodhar will also make their series debut, with Quintal driving in Elite 2 and Deodhar driving in Elite Club division.
- Former pro cyclist Tom Boonen and fellow Belgian Pedro Bonnet signed with Braxx Racing, with both making their series debut. Pedro Bonnet will drive the team's No. 90 car, while Boonen will drive the team's No. 91 car alongside Marc Goossens, who got transferred from the No. 90 car to the No. 91 car for this season.
- Monster Energy NASCAR Cup Series champion Bobby Labonte will make his full-time debut in the series, following his debut at Brands Hatch in 2017, driving the No. 18 RDV Compétition Toyota Camry in Elite 1.

==== Team changes ====
- For the first time in the team's history, Braxx Racing will field an Elite 2 driver other than Jerry de Weerdt. Former pro cyclist Tom Boonen and fellow Belgian Pedro Bonnet signed with the team to drive in Elite 2. Braxx also expands into a three-car team with the addition of the No. 91 car into the team, with the No. 91 car fielding the new Camaro chassis instead of the Mustang chassis.
- Hendriks Motorsport (not to be confused with Hendrick Motorsports that currently competes in the Monster Energy NASCAR Cup Series) supported Team Raceway Venray during the 2016 season but will now enter under their own name. The car is owned by Loris' father, former touring car racer Toine Hezemans.
- Solaris Motorsports will enter the season with Francesco Sini after racing mainly GT3 machinery in previous years.
- Go Fas Racing will expand to NASCAR Whelen Euro Series. This will make Go Fas the first team that competed in any of NASCAR's top three series to enter a car in the NASCAR Whelen Euro Series. Romain Iannetta will be the team's Elite 1 driver, while Florian Venturi will be the team's Elite 2 driver.
- Mishumotors will downsize from a two-car team into a single car team.
- Racers Motorsport also downsizes from a three-car team into a two-car team after previously listing a three-car squad to enter this season.
- Racing Total will make their NASCAR Euro Series full-season debut after previously competed in three races last season. They will also expand into a two-car team with the part-time No. 10 car.
- MRT by Nocentini returns to the series full-time, their first since 2016 as Double T by MRT Nocentini. They will also expand into a two-team effort following a one car part-time effort last season, with MRT fielding cars No. 40 (later renumbered as the No. 47 car) and No. 58 for this season.
- The Club Motorsports is expected to make their first full-season effort in the NASCAR Whelen Euro Series after participating part-time in the 2017 season.
- Pegasus Racing switches from endurance racing to NASCAR Whelen Euro Series starting from this season.
- BVR Motorsport and Race Art Technology are expected to make their debut in the series, both participating full-time fielding one car each for this season.
- Memphis Racing will make their debut in the series as a late addition to the entry list. They will field the No. 77 Chevrolet for this season.

==== Manufacturer changes ====
- NASCAR Whelen Euro Series will update their Chevrolet body style into a Camaro ZL1-based body style, in line with the move made by Chevrolet in Monster Energy NASCAR Cup Series that also introduces a Chevrolet Camaro ZL1 body style replacing the Chevrolet SS body style that have been used since the inception of the Generation 6 body style in 2013. Despite this, due to lack of available parts, all Chevrolet teams were using the Chevrolet SS body in Valencia and Franciacorta.
- BFGoodrich will become the series sole tyre supplier. The 100% Michelin subsidiary takes over from the parent company which supplied tyres for the series since its inception in 2009.

==== Mid-season team changes ====
- The Camaro body debuted at Franciacorta after the #91 Braxx Racing team made a switch to a Camaro body between Race 1 and Race 2 of the race weekend, with their Elite 2 driver Tom Boonen would become the first driver to use the new Camaro body in a NWES race (previously Chevrolet teams used a SS body similar to the body used in the Monster Energy NASCAR Cup Series from 2013 to 2017). As the season goes by, fellow Chevrolet teams PK Carsport, DF1 Racing, and Memphis Racing would also switched to the Camaro chassis.
- Three Ford teams, Solaris Motorsport, The Club Motorsports, and Race Art - Blu Mot, switched manufacturers to Chevrolet after the Camaro chassis became available for use. Later on, fellow Ford team Braxx Racing's No. 90 team would also make the switch to Chevrolet Camaro chassis.
- CAAL Motorsport and Racing Total's No. 46 team switched manufacturers mid-season, switching to Toyota and Ford respectively.
- Belgium Driver Academy made its debut at Franciacorta, running the #7 car for Martin Doubek and Maxime Pampel, both previously driving the #5 Renauer Motorsport Ford Mustang at Valencia. The team also replaces Renauer Motorsport, who shut down its operations after the Valencia round.
- After competing the first two races of the season, MRT by Nocentini withdrawn their entries for the rest of the season, although the team made a return for the Hockenheim round with Renzo Calcinati behind the wheel of the No. 47 car.
- Pegasus Racing also withdrawn their entries for the rest of the season after their only car was written out following a heavy accident in Brands Hatch.
- After the fourth round in Tours, BVR Motorsports and Hendriks Motorsport would withdrawn their Elite 1 and Elite 2 entries respectively for the rest of the season.
- RDV Compétition's third entry, the No. 51 Ford Mustang driven Didier Bec and Hugo Bec, made a return for a part-time effort, competing in Brands Hatch and Hockenheim. They would also later field the No. 04 Toyota Camry for NASCAR Pinty's Series driver Jean-François Dumoulin at Zolder as part of a driver exchange program that the Euro Series ran in conjunction with Pinty's Series.
- Alex Caffi Motorsport's No. 1 team would switch manufacturers to Toyota starting from Hockenheim.
- Mishumotors, who had previously downsized from a two-car team into a single car team, would expand into a two-car team once again when the team revived the No. 70 entry starting at Hockenheim.

== Schedule and results ==
=== Elite 1 ===
Round		Race Title	Track	Date	Pole position	Fastest lap	Winning driver	Winning manufacturer
1	R1	Valencia NASCAR Fest	(Spain) Circuit Ricardo Tormo, Valencia	14 April	(Israel) Alon Day	(Belgium) Marc Goossens	(Israel) Alon Day	Chevrolet
1	R2	Valencia NASCAR Fest	(Spain) Circuit Ricardo Tormo, Valencia	15 April	(Belgium) Marc Goossens	(Belgium) Anthony Kumpen	(Israel) Alon Day	Chevrolet
2	R3	NASCAR GP Of Italy	(Italy) Autodromo di Franciacorta, Castrezzato	19 May	(Israel) Alon Day	(Israel) Alon Day	(Israel) Alon Day	Chevrolet
2	R4	NASCAR GP Of Italy	(Italy) Autodromo di Franciacorta, Castrezzato	20 May	(Israel) Alon Day	(Belgium) Marc Goossens (Note: Retroactively awarded to Goossens after Alon Day, who scored the actual fastest lap, was disqualified following technical infringements during the post-race inspection.)	(France) Lucas Lasserre (Note: Alon Day originally won the race, but he was disqualified following technical infringements during the post-race inspection.)	Chevrolet
3	R5	NASCAR GP UK - American Speedfest VI	(United Kingdom) Brands Hatch (Indy), Swanley	9 June	(France) Frédéric Gabillon	(Italy) Gianmarco Ercoli	(France) Frédéric Gabillon	Toyota
3	R6	NASCAR GP UK - American Speedfest VI	(United Kingdom) Brands Hatch (Indy), Swanley	10 June	(Italy) Gianmarco Ercoli	(Belgium) Anthony Kumpen	(Italy) Gianmarco Ercoli	Ford
4	R7	NASCAR GP France - Oval World Challenge 2018	(France) Tours Speedway, Tours	30 June	(France) Frédéric Gabillon	(Netherlands) Loris Hezemans	(France) Frédéric Gabillon	Toyota
4	R8	NASCAR GP France - Oval World Challenge 2018	(France) Tours Speedway, Tours	1 July	(Israel) Alon Day	(France) Frédéric Gabillon	(Israel) Alon Day	Toyota
5	R9	American Fan Fest Semi-finals	(Germany) Hockenheimring (National), Hockenheim	15 September	(Netherlands) Loris Hezemans	(Israel) Alon Day	(Netherlands) Loris Hezemans	Ford
5	R10	American Fan Fest Semi-finals	(Germany) Hockenheimring (National), Hockenheim	16 September	(Israel) Alon Day	(Netherlands) Loris Hezemans	(Israel) Alon Day	Toyota
6	R11	American Festival NASCAR Finals	(Belgium) Circuit Zolder, Heusden-Zolder	20 October	(Israel) Alon Day	(Israel) Alon Day	(Israel) Alon Day	Toyota
6	R12	American Festival NASCAR Finals	(Belgium) Circuit Zolder, Heusden-Zolder	21 October	(Israel) Alon Day	(Israel) Alon Day	(Israel) Alon Day	Toyota

Oval/Speedway
Road Course

=== Elite 2 ===
Round		Race Title	Track	Date	Pole position	Fastest lap	Winning driver	Winning manufacturer
1	R1	Valencia NASCAR Fest	(Spain) Circuit Ricardo Tormo, Valencia	14 April	(France) Ulysse Delsaux	(France) Wilfried Boucenna	(France) Wilfried Boucenna	Ford
1	R2	Valencia NASCAR Fest	(Spain) Circuit Ricardo Tormo, Valencia	15 April	(France) Wilfried Boucenna	(Italy) Nicholas Risitano	(France) Wilfried Boucenna	Ford
2	R3	NASCAR GP Of Italy	(Italy) Autodromo di Franciacorta, Castrezzato	19 May	(Brazil) Felipe Rabello	(Belgium) Guillaume Dumarey	(Brazil) Felipe Rabello	Chevrolet
2	R4	NASCAR GP Of Italy	(Italy) Autodromo di Franciacorta, Castrezzato	20 May	(Belgium) Guillaume Dumarey	(Brazil) Felipe Rabello	(Belgium) Guillaume Dumarey	Chevrolet
3	R5	NASCAR GP UK - American Speedfest VI	(United Kingdom) Brands Hatch (Indy), Swanley	9 June	(Belgium) Guillaume Deflandre	(Belgium) Guillaume Dumarey	(Belgium) Guillaume Deflandre	Chevrolet
3	R6	NASCAR GP UK - American Speedfest VI	(United Kingdom) Brands Hatch (Indy), Swanley	10 June	(Belgium) Guillaume Dumarey	(France) Florian Venturi	(France) Florian Venturi	Ford
4	R7	NASCAR GP France - Oval World Challenge 2018	(France) Tours Speedway, Tours	30 June	(France) Ulysse Delsaux	(France) Ulysse Delsaux	(France) Ulysse Delsaux	Toyota
4	R8	NASCAR GP France - Oval World Challenge 2018	(France) Tours Speedway, Tours	1 July	(France) Florian Venturi	(France) Ulysse Delsaux	(France) Ulysse Delsaux	Toyota
5	R9	American Fan Fest Semi-finals	(Germany) Hockenheimring (National), Hockenheim	15 September	(France) Ulysse Delsaux	(France) Ulysse Delsaux	(France) Ulysse Delsaux	Toyota
5	R10	American Fan Fest Semi-finals	(Germany) Hockenheimring (National), Hockenheim	16 September	(France) Ulysse Delsaux	(France) Ulysse Delsaux	(Belgium) Guillaume Deflandre	Chevrolet
6	R11	American Festival NASCAR Finals	(Belgium) Circuit Zolder, Heusden-Zolder	20 October	(Belgium) Guillaume Dumarey	(Belgium) Guillaume Dumarey	(France) Florian Venturi	Ford
6	R12	American Festival NASCAR Finals	(Belgium) Circuit Zolder, Heusden-Zolder	21 October	(Belgium) Guillaume Dumarey	(France) Wilfried Boucenna	(Belgium) Guillaume Dumarey	Chevrolet

Oval/Speedway
Road Course

== Season report ==
In the Elite 1 class, the championship was closely contested by defending champion Alon Day of CAAL Racing and Frédéric Gabillon of RDV Compétition. Day initially got the upper hand after winning the first three races of the season, but his championship campaign received a setback when he got disqualified at the second race in Franciacorta due to technical infringements during post-race inspection. Gabillon took the championship lead soon after and would lead the championship by the time the playoffs begin at Hockenheim. Problems for both Gabillon and Day at Hockenheim, however, allowed Lucas Lasserre of Mishumotors and rookie Loris Hezemans of Hendriks Motorsport to close up the gap, setting up a four-way battle for the title at Zolder. Ultimately, retirements for both Lasserre and Hezemans during the first race of the Zolder race meet effectively eliminated them from title contention, and with Gabillon unable to match Day's pace for the weekend, Alon Day was crowned champion after winning his seventh race of the season at the final race of the season. Alon Day's seven race wins set a new record for the most races won in a single Elite 1 Euro Series season, one short of Stienes Longin's overall record of 8 wins in the 2016 Elite 2 season. Gabillon won two races (Brands Hatch 1 and Tours 1), while Lassere (Franciacorta 2), Hezemans (Hockenheim 1), and 2015 Elite 2 champion Gianmarco Ercoli (Brands Hatch 2) scored one race win each.

In the Elite 2 class, the championship was closely fought between four drivers: Ulysse Delsaux of RDV Compétition, defending champions Wilfried Boucenna of Knauf Racing, Florian Venturi of Go Fas Racing, and the returning Guillaume Deflandre for Memphis Racing. Boucenna initially took the championship lead after sweeping both races at Valencia. However, problems for Boucenna at Franciacorta Race 2 allowed Deflandre to caught up to him, and further problems for Boucenna at the first race of Brands Hatch race meet allowed Deflandre to take the championship lead. Delsaux then sweeps the Tours race week to take the lead in the championship, and looks set to sweep the Hockenheim race week had a tire failure in the second race at Hockenheim didn't force him to retire from the race. This allowed Deflandre, Boucenna, and a resurgent Venturi to set up a four-way battle for the championship. A costly retirement at race 1 of Zolder ultimately took out Deflandre of the championship hunt, and while Venturi was able to score a win and a second-place finish at Zolder, Delsaux had enough gap between him and Venturi to take the championship with a third-place finish at the final race of the season. Delsaux also scored the most race wins of the season with three (Tours sweep and Hockenheim 1). Venturi (Brands Hatch 2 and Zolder 1), Boucenna (Valencia sweep), Deflandre (Brands Hatch 1 and Hockenheim 2), and PK Carsport's Guillaume Dumarey (Franciacorta 2 and Zolder 2) scored two race wins, while Brazilian Felipe Rabello (Franciacorta 1) scored one race win.

In the team's championship, with both of their drivers being in the championship hunt for the entirety of the season, RDV Compétition's #3 team comfortably won team's title, finishing 107 points clear of Knauf Racing's #37 team. New teams Memphis Racing and Go Fas Racing scored an impressive third and fourth-place finish, while Knauf Racing's #73 team completes the top five in the team's championship.

In the manufacturer's championship, Toyota claimed their first Euro Series manufacturers title, becoming the first manufacturer to successfully topple Chevrolet from the top spot. Toyota's championship hopes were helped by the decision made by Alon Day's team CAAL Racing to switch manufacturers from Chevrolet to Toyota mid-season, giving Toyota the crucial edge they need to secure the manufacturer's title.

Notably, this season saw a noticeable increase in attention from the other side of the Atlantic. Both former Monster Energy NASCAR Cup Series champion Bobby Labonte and current Monster Energy NASCAR Cup Series team Go Fas Racing made their Euro Series debuts in 2018. Labonte, in his first season as a full-time driver since 2011, scored a second-place finish at the second race in Tours (the only oval race meet in the schedule) and would finish 14th in the standings with 1 Top 5 and 3 Top 10 finishes. Go Fas impressed in their debut season, finishing fourth in the team's championship with their Elite 2 driver Florian Venturi being in the championship hunt for much of the season. Truck Series regular Jennifer Jo Cobb also made an appearance at Valencia, driving for Racing Total in the Elite 2 class, a decision that ultimately allowed Racing Total driver Justin Kunz to make a Truck Series start for Jo Cobb's Truck team in Mosport. Pinty's Series driver Jean-François Dumoulin and K&N East driver Dale Quarterley made an appearance at Zolder as part of a driver exchange program that the Euro Series ran in conjunction with Pinty's Series and K&N East. Former B. J. McLeod Motorsports driver Stephen Young also made an appearance this season, driving for Racing Total's #10 entry at Tours in the Elite 2 class.

== Standings ==
Points are awarded to drivers and team using the current point system used in Monster Energy NASCAR Cup Series, NASCAR Xfinity Series, and NASCAR Camping World Truck Series, excluding the Stage and Race Winner bonus points. For the final two races in Hockenheim and Zolder, double points are awarded. In addition, the driver that gained the most positions in a race will receive bonus championship points.

=== Elite 1 ===
(key) Bold - Pole position awarded by fastest qualifying time (in Race 1) or by previous race's fastest lap (in Race 2) or by setting the fastest lap time on the semi-final heat races (Tours only). Italics - Fastest lap. * – Most laps led. ^ – Most positions gained.

Pos	Driver	(Spain) CRT		(Italy) FRA		(United Kingdom) BRH		(France) TOU		(Germany) HOC		(Belgium) ZOL		Points
1	(Israel) Alon Day	**1***	1*	**1***	**29**	21	3	2	**1***	15	**1***	**1***	**1***	512
2	(France) Frédéric Gabillon	2	3	2	4	**1***	4	**1***	6	7	20	3	4	484
3	(France) Lucas Lasserre	6	10	5	1	5	15	6	12	3	3	28	5	446
4	(Netherlands) Loris Hezemans	30	24	23	3	2	8	3	4	**1***	2	26	2	442
5	(Belgium) Stienes Longin	4	4	7	24	16	28	4	15	21	8	2	3	419
6	(France) Wilfried Boucenna	24	9	10	16	11	10	8^	8	5	19	10^	9	416
7	(France) Thomas Ferrando	7	12	6	6	8	19	7	13	26	6^	6	6	412
8	(Italy) Gianmarco Ercoli	10	7	3	23	25	**1***	10	9	19	5	8	13	407
9	(Sweden) Alexander Graff	11^	13	29	17	27	13	9	7	9	13	4	12	388
10	(France) Romain Iannetta	12	6	26	27	20	9	16	3^	12	23	23	11	347
11	(Germany) Justin Kunz	22	30	13	12	13^	14	13	DNS	14	15	15	21	339
12	(United Kingdom) Alex Sedgwick	15	14			7	6	5	5	24	9	13	28	338
13	(Czech Republic) Martin Doubek	20	11^	8	8	19	7	Wth	Wth	4^	4	12	29	337
14	(United States) Bobby Labonte	14	8	21	13	10	24	DNS	2	8	21	20	26	335
15	(Japan) Kenko Miura	17	23	28	15	15	11^	14	11	23	11	19	15	333
16	(Italy) Dario Caso	16	20	14	14	14	12	11	14	16	24	17	18	330
17	(Switzerland) Mauro Trione	23	16	27	19	22	17	12	10	11	18	24	23	320
18	(Italy) Francesco Sini	28	27	25	18	3	15	Wth	Wth	13	10	9	25	303
19	(Belgium) Marc Goossens	8	**28**	19	2*	17	2	19	DNS	2	DNS	11	27	293
20	(Germany) Matthias Hauer	25	22	16	20	24	22	17	DNS	18	16	25	24	279
21	(France) Christophe Bouchut	29	26	9	7	6	5					7	7	260
22	(Belgium) Jerry de Weerdt	21	15	15	22	26	18	15	DNS	20	14			224
23	(Belgium) Anthony Kumpen	3	2	4	5	4	23	18	Wth					200
24	(Finland) Henri Tuomaala									10	12	16	16	180
25	(Italy) Nicolò Rocca					9	21					5	17	154
26	(Italy) Fabrizio Armetta			20	26							18	10	128
27	(France) Didier Bec					18	20			17	17			124
28	(Germany) Dominik Farnbacher									6	7			122
29	(Spain) Salvador Tineo Arroyo	9	25							22	22			108
30	(Belgium) Dylan Derdaele											14	8	106
31	(France) Julien Schell	13	19	11	DNS	12	29							101
32	(Italy) Angelo Rogari	26	17	12^	25	28	26	Wth	Wth					92
33	(Brazil) Marconi Abreu	19	29	24	10^									70
34	(Canada) Jean-François Dumoulin											21	20	66
35	(Spain) Borja García	5	5											64
36	(Spain) Miguel Angel Dasi	27	21	17	21	Wth	Wth	Wth	Wth					62
37	(United States) Dale Quarterley											22	19	60
38	(Belgium) Bert Longin					23	27			25	DNS			60
39	(Brazil) William Ayer, Jr.											27	22	54
40	(Belgium) Koen Wauters											29	14^	50
41	(Italy) Alex Ciompi			18	9									47
42	(Italy) Alex Caffi			22	11									41
43	(Italy) Davide di Benedetto	18	18											38
44	(Italy) Max Lanza					DNS	25							12
	(Italy) Renzo Calcinati									Wth	Wth			0
Pos	Driver	(Spain) VAL		(Italy) FRA		(United Kingdom) BRH		(France) TOU		(Germany) HOC		(Belgium) ZOL		Points

=== Elite 2 ===
(key) Bold - Pole position awarded by fastest qualifying time (in Race 1) or by previous race's fastest lap (in Race 2) or by setting the fastest lap time on the semi-final heat races (Tours only). Italics - Fastest lap. * – Most laps led. ^ – Most positions gained.

Pos	Driver	(Spain) CRT		(Italy) FRA		(United Kingdom) BRH		(France) TOU		(Germany) HOC		(Belgium) ZOL		Points
1	(France) Ulysse Delsaux	**2**	27	5	4	5	6	**1***	1*	**1***	**20***	2	3	503
2	(France) Florian Venturi	3	3	17	25	3	1*	4	**17**	5	3	1*	2	497
3	(France) Wilfried Boucenna	1*	**1***	4	16	15	4	15	15	2	5	5	5	473
4	(Belgium) Guillaume Deflandre	14	5	3	3	**1***	5	18	3	3	1	18	12	473
5	(Luxembourg) Gil Linster	9	7	6	26	10	8	5	8	16	10	4	13	423
6	(Brazil) Felipe Rabello	24	8	**1***	2	2	DNS	13	7	6	4	23	6	416
7	(Italy) Nicholas Risitano	6	2	10	8	8	16	10	2	17	9	15	14	413
8	(France) Paul Guiod	23	4	14	12	9	19	8	4	4	2	19	16	413
9	(Germany) Justin Kunz	13	28	8	7	28	11^	2	16	7	8	20	11	385
10	(Belgium) Jerry de Weerdt	26	11^	15	13	12	12	14	6	18	15	9	17	374
11	(Japan) Kenko Miura	5	13			21	7	7	20	8	24	3	7	369
12	(Italy) Pierluigi Veronesi	22	9	27	10	29	23	6^	19	9	7	7	23	357
13	(Belgium) Tom Boonen	12	10	21	11	13	14	17	12	14	26	12	10	339
14	(Belgium) Maxime Pampel	10	17	19	6^	15	13	Wth	Wth	12	14	8	24	337
15	(Switzerland) Francesco Parli	28	18	23	14	17	15	11	5^	25	22	10	20	324
16	(Spain) Carmen Boix Gil	18	12	22	18	20	22	9	10	20	18	16	21	314
17	(Italy) Arianna Casoli	15	15	25	19	22	21	16	14	22	17	13	22	311
18	(Belgium) Guillaume Dumarey	4	25	2	**1***	4	**2**	Wth	Wth			**21**	**1***	309
19	(Italy) Max Lanza	11	24	12^	17	25	27			15	25	6^	12	299
20	(Belgium) Pedro Bonnet	21	22	11	21	26	10	3	18	27	23	24	8^	297
21	(Poland) Maciej Dreszer	8	26	16	5	6	24	Wth	Wth			22	9	227
22	(Italy) Simone Laureti			18	24	18	26	Wth	Wth	23	21	17	19	219
23	(Belgium) Diederik Ceyssens	27	14	24	20	16	18	20	13			11	25	198
24	(Germany) Mirco Schultis									13	12	14	18	182
25	(France) Hugo Bec					11^	9			10^	11			174
26	(Brazil) Marconi Abreu	7^	6	13	9									117
27	(Finland) Jesse Vartiainen									11	6^			114
28	(India) Advait Deodhar					24	25			24	13			111
29	(France) Eric Quintal	25	16	20	15									72
30	(Sweden) Freddy Nordström					7	3							64
31	(Italy) Renzo Calcinati									19	27			56
32	(Austria) Clemens Sparowitz					23	20			DNS	DNS			53
33	(Finland) Ian Eric Wadén									26	16			52
34	(France) Adrien Paviot							12	9					48
35	(Italy) Denny Zardo			9	23									42
36	(France) Julien Schell			7	DNS	27	DNS							40
37	(United Kingdom) Stephen Young							19	11					39
38	(United States) Jennifer Jo Cobb	17	19											38
39	(Germany) Marko Stipp					19	17							38
40	(France) Jean Claude Diebolt	19	21											34
41	(Spain) Julio Carayol Casas	20	23											31
42	(United Kingdom) Alex Sedgwick			26	22									26
43	(Italy) Filippo Vita	16	20											23
44	(Belgium) Pol Van Pollaert									DNS	DNS			22
	(Italy) Francesco Sini					PO	PO							0
Drivers ineligible for Elite 2 points
	(Canada) Jean-François Dumoulin											DNS	15	-
Pos	Driver	(Spain) CRT		(Italy) FRA		(United Kingdom) BRH		(France) TOU		(Germany) HOC		(Belgium) ZOL		Points

=== Team's Championship (Top 15) ===
Pos	No.	Team	Elite 1 Driver(s)	Elite 2 Driver(s)	Points
1	3	(France) RDV Compétition	(France) Frédéric Gabillon	(France) Ulysse Delsaux	1026
2	37	(France) Knauf Racing	(France) Thomas Ferrando	(France) Wilfried Boucenna	917
3	77	(Sweden) Memphis Racing	(Sweden) Alexander Graff	(Belgium) Guillaume Deflandre	886
4	32	(United States) Go Fas Racing	(France) Romain Iannetta	(France) Florian Venturi	863
5	73	(France) Knauf Racing	(France) Wilfried Boucenna	(France) Paul Guiod	861
6	54	(Italy) CAAL Racing	(Israel) Alon Day	(Italy) Arianna Casoli	851
7	11	(Belgium) PK Carsport	(Belgium) Stienes Longin	(Brazil) Felipe Rabello	844
8	8	(Italy) Racers Motorsport	(Italy) Dario Caso	(Italy) Nicholas Risitano	775
9	2	(Italy) Alex Caffi Motorsport	(Japan) Kenko Miura	(Japan) Kenko Miura (Italy) Denny Zardo	751
10	46	(Germany) Racing Total	(Germany) Justin Kunz	(Germany) Justin Kunz	729
11	78	(Belgium) Braxx Racing	(Belgium) Jerry de Weerdt (Belgium) Dylan Derdaele	(Belgium) Jerry de Weerdt	716
12	44	(Italy) CAAL Racing	(Germany) Matthias Hauer	(Luxembourg) Gil Linster	711
13	33	(Germany) Mishumotors	(France) Lucas Lasserre	(France) Eric Quintal (Sweden) Freddy Nordström (Spain) Carmen Boix Gil (Finland) Ian Eric Wadén	706
14	7	Belgium Driver Academy	(Czech Republic) Martin Doubek	(Belgium) Maxime Pampel	674
15	91	(Belgium) Braxx Racing	(Belgium) Marc Goossens	(Belgium) Tom Boonen	666
Pos	No.	Team	Elite 1 Driver(s)	Elite 2 Driver(s)	Points

== See also ==
- 2018 Monster Energy NASCAR Cup Series
- 2018 NASCAR Xfinity Series
- 2018 NASCAR Camping World Truck Series
- 2018 NASCAR K&N Pro Series East
- 2018 NASCAR K&N Pro Series West
- 2018 NASCAR Whelen Modified Tour
- 2018 NASCAR Pinty's Series
- 2018 NASCAR PEAK Mexico Series
