= Frédéric Gabillon =

French racing driver

- Nationality: (France) French
- Born: Frédéric Guy Frank Gabillon; March 27, 1976 (age 50) Uzès, Occitanie

NASCAR Whelen Euro Series career
- Debut season: 2013
- Current team: RDV Competition
- Car number: 3
- Engine: Chevrolet
- Starts: 84
- Championships: 0
- Wins: 12
- Poles: 10
- Fastest laps: 8
- Best finish: 2nd in 2013, 2016, 2018
- Finished last season: 12th in 2019

Previous series
- 2018 2014 2011 2010-12 2007-09 1999-2006 1997-98: NASCAR Pinty's Series; NASCAR K&N Pro Series East; FIA GT3 European Championship; French GT Championship; Porsche Carrera Cup France; Renault Clio Cup; Championnat de France Formula Renault

Championship titles
- 1999: French Renault Mégane Trophy

NASCAR Canada Series career
- 1 race run over 1 year
- 2018 position: 37th
- Best finish: 37th (2018)
- First race: 2018 Le 50 Tours Can-Am (Trois-Rivières)
- Last race: 2018 Le 50 Tours Can-Am (Trois-Rivières)
Wins	Top tens	Poles
0	1	0
- Statistics up to date as of July 5, 2019.

Frédéric Guy Frank Gabillon (born 27 March 1976 in Uzès) is a French professional racing driver that currently competes in the NASCAR Whelen Euro Series, driving the No. 3 Chevrolet SS for RDV Competition in the EuroNASCAR PRO class. He is a three-time runner-up in the Euro Series, having finished second in the championship in 2013, 2016, and 2018.

== Racing career ==
Gabillon started his racing career in Championnat de France Formula Renault in 1997. He then moved to Renault Mégane Trophy in 1999, where he won the French Renault Mégane Trophy in his debut season. After seven years of competing in the Renault Clio Cup, Gabillon made his sports car racing debut in 2007 in the Porsche Carrera Cup France, scoring a total of two wins in three seasons with a best finish of sixth in 2008 and 2009. He then drove in French GT Championship before making a switch to the NASCAR Whelen Euro Series in 2013.

In his first season in the NASCAR Whelen Euro Series, Gabillon scored four race wins and ten podiums on his way to finish second in the championship. He was then rewarded with an opportunity to drive in the K&N Pro Series East at the 2013 season finale race at Road Atlanta in a Rick Ware Racing prepared car, but it didn't materialize. The following year, he scored one more win to finish in fourth in the Elite 1 championship before making his racing debut in the United States in the K&N East race at Watkins Glen in a Troy Williams-entered car. Gabillon finished in 12th place after starting from the penultimate row of the grid.

In 2015, Gabillon switched teams to RDV Competition, where he has stayed to this day. In 2016, Gabillon became the first driver to finish in the top-five in all races of the season, although he would lose the title to Anthony Kumpen by 11 points. He would finish second in the championship again in 2018, this time finishing 28 points behind Alon Day. In the same year, he would make his NASCAR Pinty's Series debut at Circuit Trois-Rivières as part of NASCAR Home Tracks' driver exchange program, driving the No. 07 Dodge Challenger for Dumoulin Competition.

Gabillon struggled the next year as he finished the season in 12th place after scoring just three top-five and six top-ten finishes. Despite this, he managed to score a victory in the second race at Brands Hatch after a race-long battle with Stienes Longin. Starting from pole position, Gabillon initially lost the lead to Loris Hezemans but he regained the lead after Hezemans received a drive-through penalty for jumping the restart.

== Complete motorsports results ==
=== NASCAR ===
==== Whelen Euro Series - EuroNASCAR PRO ====
(key) Bold - Pole position awarded by fastest qualifying time (in Race 1) or by previous race's fastest lap (in Race 2). Italics - Fastest lap. * – Most laps led. ^ – Most positions gained.)

NASCAR Whelen Euro Series - EuroNASCAR PRO results
Year	Team	No.	Make	1	2	3	4	5	6	7	8	9	10	11	12	13	NWES	Pts
2013	Rapido Racing by Still	05	Chevy	NOG; 18	NOG; 7	DIJ; 2	DIJ; 2	**BRH**; 3*	BRH; 2	**TOU**; 1*	**TOU**; 1*	MNZ; 2	MNZ; 2	**BUG**; 1*	BUG; 1*		2nd	692
2014	Still Racing	12	Chevy	VAL; 27	VAL; 5	BRH; 2	BRH; 6	TOU; 3*	TOU; 4	NÜR; 3	NÜR; 1*	UMB; 5	UMB; 3	BUG; 17*	BUG; 3		4th	612
2015	RDV Competition	3	Ford	VAL; 18	VAL; 2	VEN; 2	VEN; 4	BRH; 2	BRH; 15	TOU; 2	TOU; 2	UMB; 14	UMB; 3	ZOL; 16	ZOL; 4		6th	587
2016	RDV Competition	3	Ford	VAL; 2	VAL; 2	VEN; 1	VEN; 5	BRH; 2	BRH; 2	**TOU**; 1*	**TOU**; 1*	ADR; 5	ADR; 3	ZOL; 2	ZOL; 1*		2nd	646
2017	RDV Competition	3	Ford	VAL; 14	VAL; 2	BRH; 22	BRH; 2	HOC; 11	HOC; 8	VEN; 3	VEN; 3	**FRA**; 2	FRA; 4	ZOL; 4	ZOL; 2		4th	596
2018	RDV Competition	3	Toyota	VAL; 2	VAL; 3	FRA; 2	FRA; 4	**BRH**; 1*	BRH; 4	**TOU**; 1*	TOU; 6	HOC; 7	HOC; 20	ZOL; 3	ZOL; 4		2nd	484
2019	RDV Competition	3	Chevy	VAL; 8	VAL; 6	FRA; 18	FRA; 26	BRH; 11	**BRH**; 1*	MOS; 17	MOS; 21	VEN; 5	HOC; 6	HOC; 5	ZOL; 23	ZOL; DNS	12th	394
2020	RDV Competition	3	Chevy	VNC	VNC	BRH	BRH	MOS	MOS	VEN	VAL	VAL	ZOL	ZOL	HOC	HOC	-*	-*

==== K&N Pro Series East ====
(key) (Bold – Pole position awarded by qualifying time. Italics – Pole position earned by points standings or practice time. * – Most laps led.)

NASCAR K&N Pro Series East results
Year	Team	No.	Make	1	2	3	4	5	6	7	8	9	10	11	12	13	14	15	16	NKNPSEC	Pts
2014	Troy Williams Racing	86	Chevy	NSM	DAY	BRI	GRE	RCH	IOW	BGS	FIF	LGY	NHA	COL	IOW	GLN; 12	VIR	GRE	DOV	56th	32

==== Pinty's Series ====
(key) (Bold – Pole position awarded by qualifying time. Italics – Pole position earned by points standings or practice time. * – Most laps led.)

NASCAR Pinty's Series results
Year	Team	No.	Make	1	2	3	4	5	6	7	8	9	10	11	12	13	NPSC	Pts
2018	Dumoulin Competition	07	Dodge	MSP	JUK	ACD	TOR	SAS	SAS	EIR	CTR; 8	RIS	MSP	ASE	NHA	JUK	37th	36

^{*} Season still in progress
