= 2018 Chevrolet Silverado 250 =

Race details
- Race 17 of 23 in the 2018 NASCAR Camping World Truck Series season
- Date: August 26, 2018
- Location: Canadian Tire Motorsport Park in Bowmanville, Ontario
- Course: Permanent racing facility
- Course length: 2.459 miles (3.957 km)
- Distance: 65 laps, 159.835 mi (257.229 km)
- Scheduled distance: 64 laps, 157.376 mi (253.272 km)
- Average speed: 76.476 miles per hour (123.076 km/h)

Pole position
Driver	Ben Rhodes	ThorSport Racing
- Time: 90.465

Most laps led
Driver	Noah Gragson	Kyle Busch Motorsports
- Laps: 35

Winner
No. 24	Justin Haley	GMS Racing

Television in the United States
- Network: FS1
- Announcers: Vince Welch; Phil Parsons; Michael Waltrip

Radio in the United States
- Radio: PRN

The 2018 Chevrolet Silverado 250 was a NASCAR Camping World Truck Series race held on August 26, 2018 at Canadian Tire Motorsport Park in Bowmanville, Ontario. Contested over 65 laps on the 2.459-mile (3.957-kilometre) road course – having been extended from 64 laps due to a green–white–checkered finish – it was the 17th race of the 2018 NASCAR Camping World Truck Series season.

The race was won by GMS Racing driver Justin Haley for his second win of the season, taking advantage of a final-corner collision between Kyle Busch Motorsports teammates Todd Gilliland and Noah Gragson, to advance to the Round of 6 in the playoffs.

== Entry list ==
No.	Driver	Team	Manufacturer
0	Justin Kunz	Jennifer Jo Cobb Racing	Chevrolet
02	Austin Hill	Young's Motorsports	Chevrolet
2	Cody Coughlin	GMS Racing	Chevrolet
3	Jordan Anderson	Jordan Anderson Racing	Chevrolet
4	Todd Gilliland (R)	Kyle Busch Motorsports	Toyota
6	Norm Benning	Norm Benning Racing	Chevrolet
8	John Hunter Nemechek (i)	NEMCO Motorsports	Chevrolet
10	Jennifer Jo Cobb	Jennifer Jo Cobb Racing	Chevrolet
12	Alex Tagliani	Young's Motorsports	Chevrolet
13	Myatt Snider (R)	ThorSport Racing	Ford
15	Wendell Chavous	Premium Motorsports	Chevrolet
16	Brett Moffitt	Hattori Racing Enterprises	Toyota
18	Noah Gragson	Kyle Busch Motorsports	Toyota
20	Max Tullman (i)	Young's Motorsports	Chevrolet
21	Johnny Sauter	GMS Racing	Chevrolet
22	Austin Wayne Self	Niece Motorsports	Chevrolet
24	Justin Haley	GMS Racing	Chevrolet
25	Timothy Peters	GMS Racing	Chevrolet
33	Jason White	Reaume Brothers Racing	Chevrolet
34	Jesse Iwuji	Reaume Brothers Racing	Chevrolet
41	Ben Rhodes	ThorSport Racing	Ford
45	Justin Fontaine (R)	Niece Motorsports	Chevrolet
49	D. J. Kennington	Premium Motorsports	Chevrolet
50	Ray Ciccarelli	Beaver Motorsports	Chevrolet
51	Harrison Burton	Kyle Busch Motorsports	Toyota
52	Stewart Friesen	Halmar Friesen Racing	Chevrolet
54	Bo LeMastus (R)	DGR-Crosley	Toyota
74	Mike Harmon (i)	Mike Harmon Racing	Chevrolet
87	Joe Nemechek	NEMCO Motorsports	Chevrolet
88	Matt Crafton	ThorSport Racing	Ford
97	Roger Reuse	JJL Motorsports	Chevrolet
98	Grant Enfinger	ThorSport Racing	Ford

== Qualifying ==
Ben Rhodes scored the pole for the race with a time of 90.465 and a speed of 97.854 mph (157.481 km/h).

=== Qualifying results ===
Pos	No.	Driver	Team	Manufacturer	Best Speed
1	41	Ben Rhodes	ThorSport Racing	Ford	97.854
2	18	Noah Gragson	Kyle Busch Motorsports	Toyota	97.395
3	13	Myatt Snider (R)	ThorSport Racing	Ford	96.610
4	88	Matt Crafton	ThorSport Racing	Ford	95.971
5	25	Timothy Peters	GMS Racing	Chevrolet	95.696
6	21	Johnny Sauter	GMS Racing	Chevrolet	95.556
7	8	John Hunter Nemechek (i)	NEMCO Motorsports	Chevrolet	95.419
8	24	Justin Haley	GMS Racing	Chevrolet	94.895
9	02	Austin Hill	Young's Motorsports	Chevrolet	94.871
10	12	Alex Tagliani	Young's Motorsports	Chevrolet	94.669
11	98	Grant Enfinger	ThorSport Racing	Ford	94.235
12	2	Cody Coughlin	GMS Racing	Chevrolet	93.964
13	49	D. J. Kennington	Premium Motorsports	Chevrolet	90.991
14	51	Harrison Burton	Kyle Busch Motorsports	Toyota	90.789
15	4	Todd Gilliland (R)	Kyle Busch Motorsports	Toyota	90.676
16	52	Stewart Friesen	Halmar Friesen Racing	Chevrolet	90.624
17	16	Brett Moffitt	Hattori Racing Enterprises	Toyota	90.459
18	22	Austin Wayne Self	Niece Motorsports	Chevrolet	89.668
19	20	Max Tullman (i)	Young's Motorsports	Chevrolet	86.415
20	45	Justin Fontaine (R)	Niece Motorsports	Chevrolet	71.194
21	54	Bo LeMastus (R)	DGR-Crosley	Toyota	0.000
22	3	Jordan Anderson	Jordan Anderson Racing	Chevrolet	0.000
23	15	Wendell Chavous	Premium Motorsports	Chevrolet	0.000
24	97	Roger Reuse	JJL Motorsports	Chevrolet	0.000
25	6	Norm Benning	Norm Benning Racing	Chevrolet	0.000
26	10	Jennifer Jo Cobb	Jennifer Jo Cobb Racing	Chevrolet	0.000
27	33	Jason White	Reaume Brothers Racing	Chevrolet	0.000
28	50	Ray Ciccarelli	Beaver Motorsports	Chevrolet	0.000
29	87	Joe Nemechek	NEMCO Motorsports	Chevrolet	0.000
30	0	Justin Kunz	Jennifer Jo Cobb Racing	Chevrolet	0.000
31	34	Jesse Iwuji	Reaume Brothers Racing	Chevrolet	0.000
32	74	Mike Harmon (i)	Mike Harmon Racing	Chevrolet	0.000

== Race ==
=== Stage results ===
Stage 1

Pos	No	Driver	Team	Manufacturer	Points
1	18	Noah Gragson	Kyle Busch Motorsports	Toyota	10
2	41	Ben Rhodes	ThorSport Racing	Ford	9
3	24	Justin Haley	GMS Racing	Chevrolet	8
4	8	John Hunter Nemechek (i)	NEMCO Motorsports	Chevrolet	0
5	88	Matt Crafton	ThorSport Racing	Ford	6
6	16	Brett Moffitt	Hattori Racing Enterprises	Toyota	5
7	21	Johnny Sauter	GMS Racing	Chevrolet	4
8	25	Timothy Peters	GMS Racing	Chevrolet	3
9	98	Grant Enfinger	ThorSport Racing	Ford	2
10	49	D. J. Kennington	Premium Motorsports	Chevrolet	1

Stage 2

Pos	No	Driver	Team	Manufacturer	Points
1	18	Noah Gragson	Kyle Busch Motorsports	Toyota	10
2	16	Brett Moffitt	Hattori Racing Enterprises	Toyota	9
3	24	Justin Haley	GMS Racing	Chevrolet	8
4	8	John Hunter Nemechek (i)	NEMCO Motorsports	Chevrolet	0
5	88	Matt Crafton	ThorSport Racing	Ford	6
6	52	Stewart Friesen	Halmar Friesen Racing	Chevrolet	5
7	21	Johnny Sauter	GMS Racing	Chevrolet	4
8	25	Timothy Peters	GMS Racing	Chevrolet	3
9	98	Grant Enfinger	ThorSport Racing	Ford	2
10	13	Myatt Snider (R)	ThorSport Racing	Ford	1

=== Final stage results ===
Stage 3

Pos	Grid	No	Driver	Team	Manufacturer	Laps	Points
1	8	24	Justin Haley	GMS Racing	Chevrolet	65	56
2	7	8	John Hunter Nemechek (i)	NEMCO Motorsports	Chevrolet	65	0
3	17	16	Brett Moffitt	Hattori Racing Enterprises	Toyota	65	48
4	5	25	Timothy Peters	GMS Racing	Chevrolet	65	39
5	4	88	Matt Crafton	ThorSport Racing	Ford	65	44
6	6	21	Johnny Sauter	GMS Racing	Chevrolet	65	39
7	16	52	Stewart Friesen	Halmar Friesen Racing	Chevrolet	65	35
8	9	02	Austin Hill	Young's Motorsports	Chevrolet	65	29
9	2	18	Noah Gragson	Kyle Busch Motorsports	Toyota	65	48
10	10	12	Alex Tagliani	Young's Motorsports	Chevrolet	65	27
11	15	4	Todd Gilliland (R)	Kyle Busch Motorsports	Toyota	65	26
12	13	49	D. J. Kennington	Premium Motorsports	Chevrolet	65	26
13	14	51	Harrison Burton	Kyle Busch Motorsports	Toyota	65	24
14	1	41	Ben Rhodes	ThorSport Racing	Ford	65	32
15	12	2	Cody Coughlin	GMS Racing	Chevrolet	65	22
16	22	3	Jordan Anderson	Jordan Anderson Racing	Chevrolet	65	21
17	11	98	Grant Enfinger	ThorSport Racing	Ford	65	24
18	20	45	Justin Fontaine (R)	Niece Motorsports	Chevrolet	65	19
19	3	13	Myatt Snider (R)	ThorSport Racing	Ford	65	19
20	25	6	Norm Benning	Norm Benning Racing	Chevrolet	65	17
21	18	22	Austin Wayne Self	Niece Motorsports	Chevrolet	65	16
22	21	54	Bo LeMastus (R)	DGR-Crosley	Toyota	64	15
23	27	33	Jason White	Reaume Brothers Racing	Chevrolet	63	14
24	23	15	Wendell Chavous	Premium Motorsports	Chevrolet	63	13
25	31	34	Jesse Iwuji	Reaume Brothers Racing	Chevrolet	63	12
26	30	0	Justin Kunz	Jennifer Jo Cobb Racing	Chevrolet	62	11
27	24	97	Roger Reuse	JJL Motorsports	Chevrolet	35	10
28	28	50	Ray Ciccarelli	Beaver Motorsports	Chevrolet	34	9
29	26	10	Jennifer Jo Cobb	Jennifer Jo Cobb Racing	Chevrolet	32	8
30	19	20	Max Tullman (i)	Young's Motorsports	Chevrolet	29	0
31	32	74	Mike Harmon (i)	Mike Harmon Racing	Chevrolet	7	0
32	29	87	Joe Nemechek	NEMCO Motorsports	Chevrolet	2	5

Previous race: 2018 UNOH 200	NASCAR Camping World Truck Series; 2018 season	Next race: 2018 World of Westgate 200
