= Ulysse Delsaux =

French professional racing driver

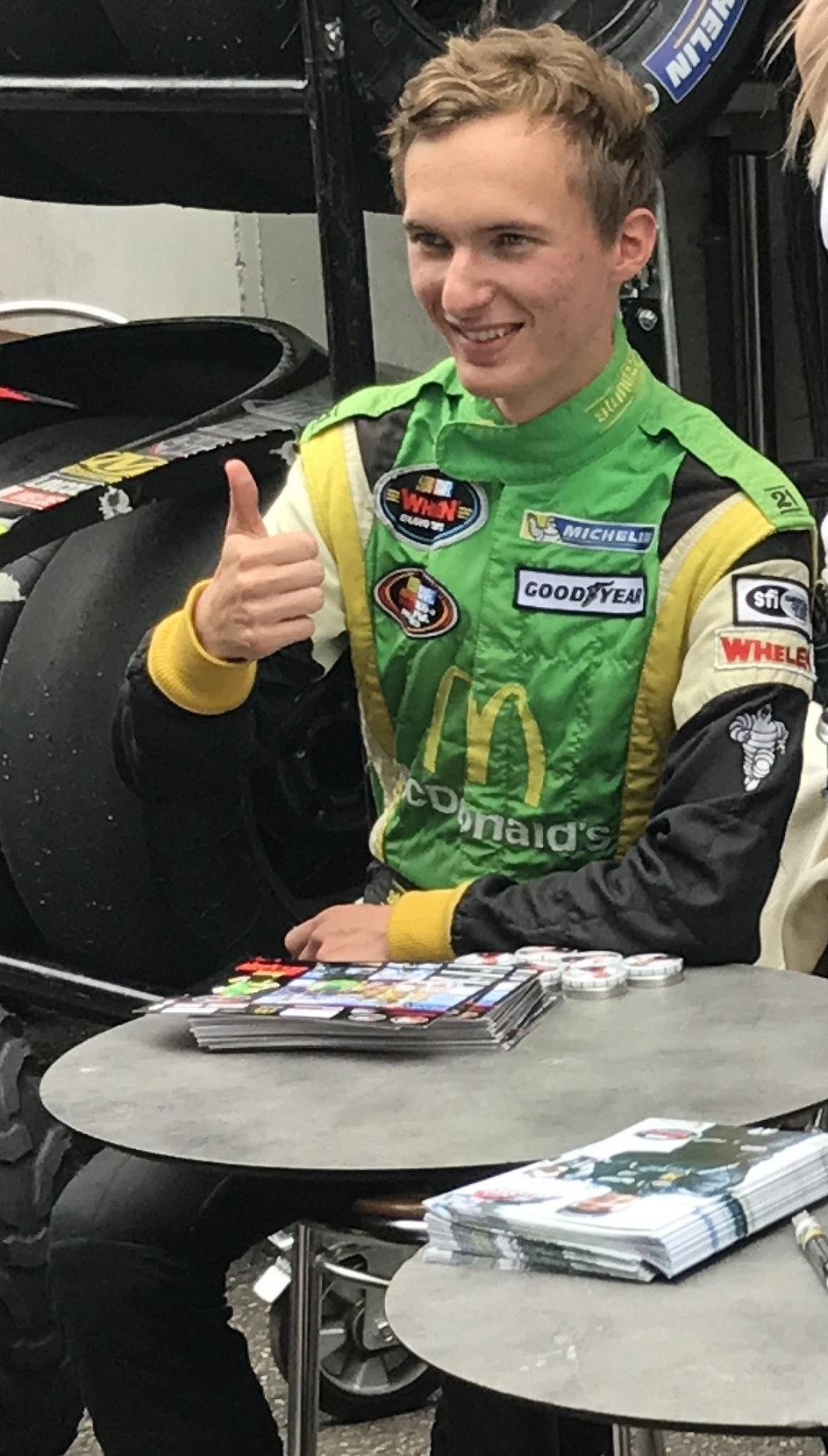
- Delsaux at Raceway Venray in 2017
- Nationality: (France) French
- Born: 22 September 1997 (age 29) Troyes, France

NASCAR Whelen Euro Series career
- Debut season: 2014
- Current team: RDV Competition
- Car number: 10
- Starts: 25 (ENPRO); 47 (EN2)
- Championships: 1 (2018 EN2)
- Wins: 0 (ENPRO); 4 (EN2)
- Poles: 0 (ENPRO); 6 (EN2)
- Fastest laps: 1 (ENPRO); 7 (EN2)
- Best finish: 1st in 2018 (EN2)
- Finished last season: 9th in 2019

Previous series
- 2016: NASCAR K&N Pro Series East

Championship titles
- 2018: NASCAR Whelen Euro Series – EuroNASCAR 2

Ulysse Delsaux (born 22 September 1997) is a French professional racing driver who currently competes in the NASCAR Whelen Euro Series, driving the No. 14 Ford Mustang for SpeedHouse Racing in the EuroNASCAR PRO class. He is a one-time champion in the Euro Series, having won the EuroNASCAR 2 championship in 2018.

== Racing career ==
Delsaux made his kart racing debut in the Ile-De-France Minikart Championship at the age of nine, two years after his father Emmanuel gave him his first kart. Early in his career, he competed in the regional championships and won the regional title in 2011, allowing him to move to international championships before a crash forced Delsaux to stop competing in karting.

In 2013, Delsaux switched to stock car racing and joined the NASCAR Whelen Euro Series Developmental program. He was given to opportunity to make his racing debut in a street stock race at Bowman-Gray Stadium. In 2014, he made his debut in the NASCAR Whelen Euro Series, signing a contract to compete in the Elite 2 class with RDV Competition. He finished ninth in the championship with a best finish of fourth in the second race at Umbria.

Delsaux was transferred to the No. 3 team as the Elite 2 partner of Frédéric Gabillon for the 2015 season. He finished the season in 7th in the championship with 1 podium finish in the second race at Tours, two Top-5 finishes, and a total of ten top-ten finishes. In 2016, he made his K&N East debut for Precision Performance Motorsports during the season-opening round at New Smyrna. He qualified in 19th before finishing in 28th after he was involved in a crash on lap 50. He also moved up to the Elite 1 class on the same year, driving the No. 31 RDV Competition Ford Mustang for all twelve races of the season. He finished ninth in points with six top-ten finishes.

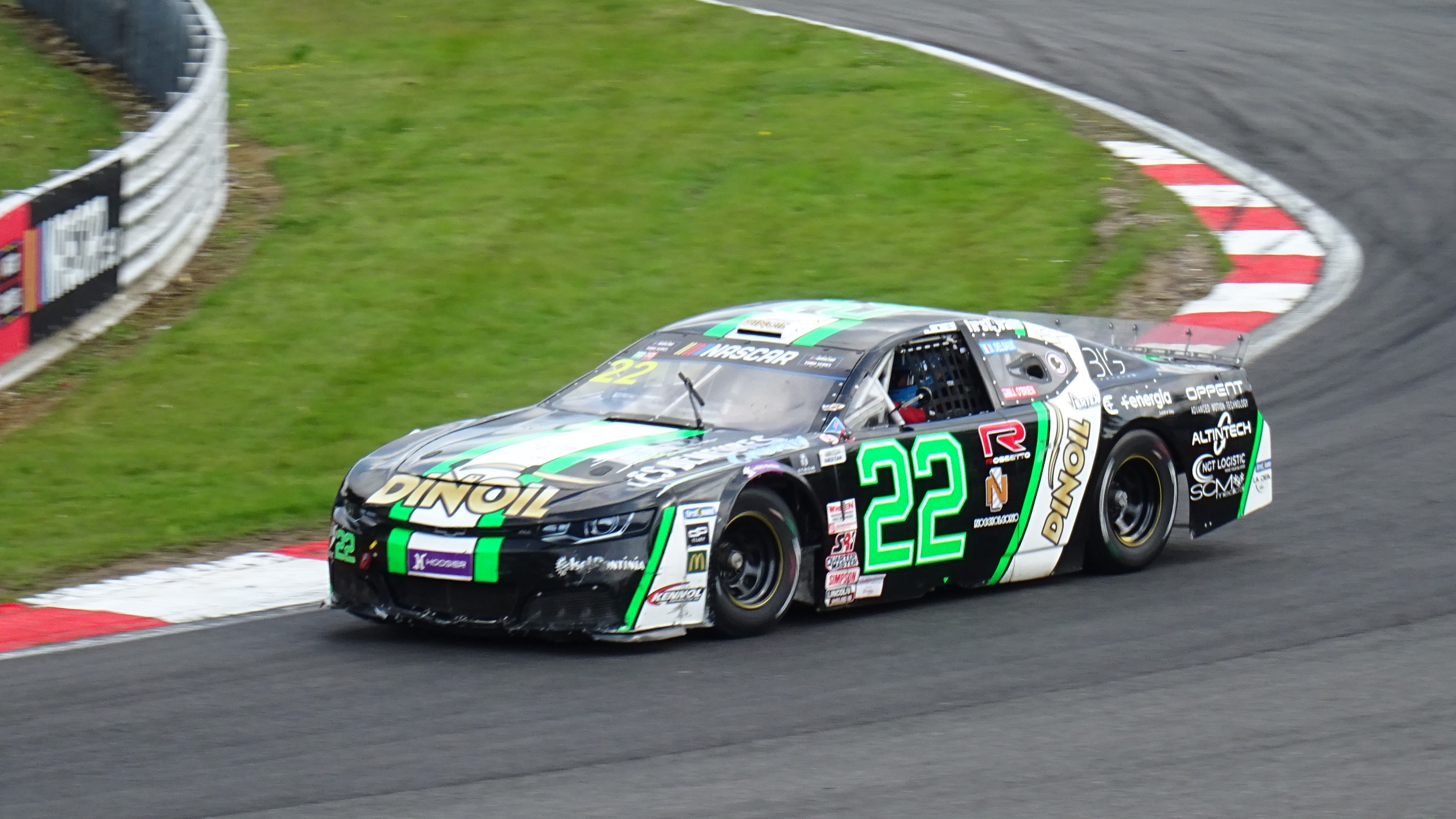
Delsaux at Brands Hatch in 2025

The next season, 2017, saw Delsaux move back to Elite 2 class to once again partner Gabillon in the No. 3 RDV Competition team. He scored an emotional first Euro Series career victory at Valencia, winning by 3.5 seconds over eventual championship winner Thomas Ferrando in the Sunday race. Afterward, Delsaux was joined by fellow drivers, spotters, and NASCAR officials to celebrate in the victory lane. Delsaux would finish the season in fourth, scoring a total of one win, six podiums, and ten top-ten finishes.

In 2018, Delsaux once again competed in Elite 2 in the No. 3 RDV Competition team. He swept both races at Tours Speedway to claim his first victories in an oval. Leading the championship coming to the double points-paying playoff rounds at Hockenheim and Zolder, Delsaux started his playoff run with his third victory at the season at the Saturday race in Hockenheim before a puncture on the final lap of the Sunday race denied him of an opportunity to sweep the weekend. At the season finale round in Zolder, Delsaux was able to recover from an early accident to finish in second on the first race before being crowned as the Elite 2 champion after finishing third in the second race. Delsaux finished the season just six points ahead of Florian Venturi in the championship with three wins, six podiums, and ten top-ten finishes.

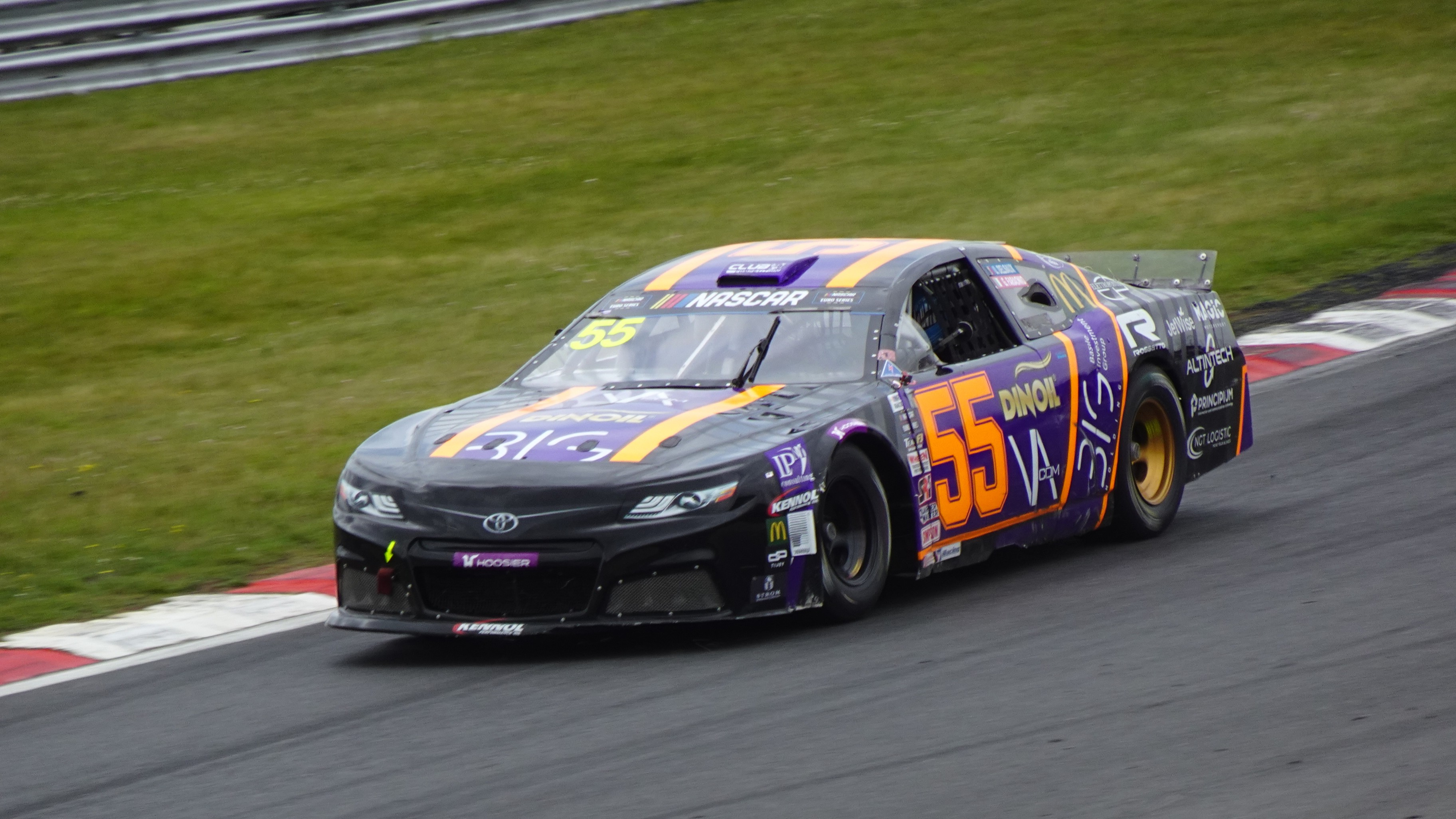
Delsaux racing at Brands Hatch in 2026

Delsaux returned to the Elite 1 class in 2019 to replace Bobby Labonte in the second RDV team. Delsaux would run the No. 36 car for 2019. He stated that the No. 36 is an inversion of 63, which serves as a tribute to both his father Emmanuel, who was born in 1963, and Jim Clark, who won his first Formula One title in 1963. He finished ninth in points with one top-five and four top-ten finishes.

For the 2020 season, Delsaux was originally scheduled to race in both the EuroNASCAR PRO and the EuroNASCAR 2 class, and was also going to run the No. 10 instead of the No. 36, stating that he wanted to run the number as a way to represent Aube, his home department. However, he did not race at all that year due to COVID-19 restrictions.

== Personal life ==
Delsaux is autistic. He had trouble communicating with others as a child and was unable to talk until he was five years old. As of 2017, he still had to make a monthly visit with a doctor in Paris. He has said that his aspirations in racing "is the demonstration that there is no obstacle you cannot overcome with hard work, passion, and a strong will to succeed". His childhood idols include Jeff Gordon and Jim Clark.

Delsaux is known to be a fan of anime and his helmet currently features an illustration of Sinon from Sword Art Online on the back of his helmet.

== Complete motorsports results ==
=== NASCAR ===
==== Whelen Euro Series - EuroNASCAR PRO ====
(key) Bold - Pole position awarded by fastest qualifying time (in Race 1) or by previous race's fastest lap (in Race 2). Italics - Fastest lap. * – Most laps led. ^ – Most positions gained.

NASCAR Whelen Euro Series - EuroNASCAR PRO results
Year	Team	No.	Make	1	2	3	4	5	6	7	8	9	10	11	12	13	NWES	Pts
2016	RDV Competition	31	Ford	VAL; 11	VAL; 24	VEN; 9	VEN; 19	BRH; 12	BRH; 14	TOU; 7	TOU; 10	ADR; 8	ADR; 20	ZOL; 9	ZOL; 10		9th	496
2019	RDV Competition	36	Chevy	VAL; 16	VAL; 23	FRA; 15	FRA; 11	BRH; 13	BRH; 14	MOS; 11	MOS; 5	VEN; 7^	HOC; 9	HOC; 10	ZOL; 11	ZOL; 11	9th	429
2021	RDV Competition	10	Chevy	ESP; 13	ESP; 12	GBR; 13	GBR; 11	CZE; 13	CZE; 8	CRO; 9	CRO; 10	BEL; 9	BEL; 11	ITA; Wth	ITA; Wth		19th	218
2023	SpeedHouse Racing	14	Ford	ESP; 11	ESP; 6	GBR; 12	GBR; 10	ITA; 6	ITA; 7	CZE; 6	CZE; 9	GER; 8	GER; 11	BEL; 9	BEL; 9		7th	345
2024	SpeedHouse Racing	14	Ford	ESP; 6	ESP; 6	ITA	ITA	GBR	GBR	NLD	CZE	CZE	GER	GER	BEL	BEL	-*	-*

==== Whelen Euro Series - EuroNASCAR 2 ====
NASCAR Whelen Euro Series - EuroNASCAR 2 results
Year	Team	No.	Make	1	2	3	4	5	6	7	8	9	10	11	12	NWES	Pts
2014	RDV Competition	23	Chevy	VAL; 13	VAL; 15											9th	504
2014	RDV Competition	10	Chevy			BRH; 15	BRH; 17	TOU; 24	TOU; 13	NÜR; DNS	NÜR; 9	UMB; 6	UMB; 4	BUG; 12	BUG; 21	9th	504
2015	RDV Competition	3	Ford	VAL; 6	VAL; 20	VEN; 8	VEN; 7	BRH; 8	BRH; 10	TOU; 5	TOU; 2	UMB; 6	UMB; 9	ZOL; 12	ZOL; 10	7th	572
2017	RDV Competition	3	Toyota	VAL; 2	VAL; 1*	BRH; 7	BRH; 2	VEN; 3		**HOC**; 18		**FRA**; 8		ZOL; 12		4th	580
2017	RDV Competition	3	Ford						VEN; 12		HOC; 2		FRA; 3		ZOL; 8	4th	580
2018	RDV Competition	3	Toyota	**VAL**; 2	VAL; 27	FRA; 5	FRA; 4	BRH; 5	BRH; 6	**TOU**; 1*	TOU; 1*	**HOC**; 1*	**HOC**; 20*	ZOL; 2	ZOL; 3	1st	503
2022	RDV Competition	3	Chevy	ESP; 5	ESP; 4	GBR; 6	GBR; 6	ITA; 27	ITA; 4	CZE; 17	CZE; 5	**BEL**; 7	BEL; 4	CRO; 11	CRO; 7	5th	367

==== K&N Pro Series East ====
(key) (Bold – Pole position awarded by qualifying time. Italics – Pole position earned by points standings or practice time. * – Most laps led.)

NASCAR K&N Pro Series East results
Year	Team	No.	Make	1	2	3	4	5	6	7	8	9	10	11	12	13	14	NKNPSEC	Pts	Ref
2016	Precision Performance Motorsports	46	Toyota	NSM; 28	MOB	GRE	BRI	VIR	DOM	STA	COL	NHA	IOW	GLN	GRE	NJM	DOV	58th	16	

^{*} Season still in progress

Sporting positions
Preceded by Thomas Ferrando	NASCAR Whelen Euro Series EuroNASCAR 2 Champion; 2018	Succeeded by Lasse Sørensen
