= Tours Speedway =

Oval racing circuit in Tours, France

- Oval (2012–2018)
- Location: Parc des expositions, Tours, France
- Coordinates: 47°22′42″N 0°43′29″E
- Opened: 7 July 2012; 13 years ago
- Closed: 2 October 2018; 7 years ago
- Major events: NASCAR Whelen Euro Series (2012–2016, 2018)
- Website: http://www.tours-speedway.com

Oval (2012–2018)
- Surface: Asphalt
- Length: 0.575 km (0.357 mi)
- Turns: 4
- Banking: 9°

Tours Speedway was a 0.575 km (0.357 mi) oval speedway located in Tours, France. The track is located at the parkingplace of the Parc des expositions east of the city. It was first used in 2012. The only event raced on the track is the NASCAR Whelen Euro Series.

On October, 2nd, Tours announced that the 2018 NASCAR Whelen Euro Series race will be the last NASCAR race in this track.

== Race results ==
Year	Class	Driver	Team	Car
2012	Elite	(United States) Ben Kennedy	TFT Racing	Chevrolet
2012	Elite	(France) Éric Hélary	Still Racing	Chevrolet
2012	Open	(France) Frédéric Johais	Overdrive Racing	Chevrolet
2012	Open	(France) Vincent Gonneau	Gonneau Racing	Chevrolet
2013	Elite	(France) Frédéric Gabillon	Rapido Racing	Chevrolet
2013	Elite	(France) Frédéric Gabillon	Rapido Racing	Chevrolet
2013	Open	(France) Julien Goupy	Rapido Racing	Chevrolet
2013	Open	(Australia) Josh Burdon	Scorpus Racing	Chevrolet
2014	Elite 1	(Spain) Ander Vilariño	TFT Racing	Chevrolet
2014	Elite 1	(Austria) Mathias Lauda	DF1 Racing	Chevrolet
2014	Elite 2	(Belgium) Denis Dupont	RCP - Marc VDS	Toyota
2014	Elite 2	(Belgium) Denis Dupont	RCP - Marc VDS	Toyota
2015	Elite 1	(Italy) Nicolò Rocca	CAAL Racing	Chevrolet
2015	Elite 1	(Spain) Ander Vilariño	TFT Racing	Chevrolet
2015	Elite 2	(Belgium) Stienes Longin	PK Carsport	Chevrolet
2015	Elite 2	(Italy) Gianmarco Ercoli	Double-T by MRT	Chevrolet
2016	Elite 1	(France) Frédéric Gabillon	RDV Competition	Ford
2016	Elite 1	(France) Frédéric Gabillon	RDV Competition	Ford
2016	Elite 2	(Italy) Riccardo Geltrude	Double-T by MRT	Ford
2016	Elite 2	(Belgium) Stienes Longin	PK Carsport	Chevrolet
2018	Elite 1	(France) Frédéric Gabillon	RDV Competition	Toyota
2018	Elite 1	(Israel) Alon Day	CAAL Racing	Toyota
2018	Elite 2	(France) Ulysse Delsaux	RDV Competition	Toyota
2018	Elite 2	(France) Ulysse Delsaux	RDV Competition	Toyota
