= 2016 NASCAR Whelen Euro Series =

Locations of the European racing circuits

The 2016 NASCAR Whelen Euro Series was the eighth Racecar Euro Series season, and the fourth under the NASCAR Whelen Euro Series branding. Ander Vilariño entered the season as the defending champion, but he did not defend his title.

== Rules changes ==
The NASCAR Whelen Euro Series presented a new technical package at the Circuit Zolder Finals on October 2, 2015. The package includes improvements to the braking system, suspensions and a revised aerodynamic configuration. The Chevrolet SS body was unveiled at Zolder, while the Ford Mustang body made its debut on December 5, 2015 in a testing session at Fontenay Le Comte, France.

== Teams and drivers ==
=== Elite 1 Division ===
Manufacturer	Car	Team	No.	Race Driver	Rounds
Chevrolet	Chevrolet SS	(Belgium) PK Carsport	11	(Belgium) Bert Longin	All
Chevrolet	Chevrolet SS	(Belgium) PK Carsport	24	(Belgium) Anthony Kumpen	All
Chevrolet	Chevrolet SS	(Belgium) PK Carsport	46	(United States) Brandon Gdovic	1
Chevrolet	Chevrolet SS	(Netherlands) Raceway Venray	14	(Netherlands) Barry Maessen	2, 6
Chevrolet	Chevrolet SS	(Netherlands) Raceway Venray	21	(United Kingdom) Colin White	2
Chevrolet	Chevrolet SS	(Netherlands) Raceway Venray	21	(Netherlands) Maik Barten	6
Chevrolet	Chevrolet SS	(Austria) Dexwet Renauer Team	26	(Austria) Willy Gruber	All
Chevrolet	Chevrolet SS	(Monaco) Alex Caffi Motorsports	33	(Netherlands) Renger van der Zande	6
Chevrolet	Chevrolet SS	(Italy) CAAL Racing	44	(Sweden) Freddy Nordström	All
Chevrolet	Chevrolet SS	(Italy) CAAL Racing	54	(Israel) Alon Day	All
Chevrolet	Chevrolet SS	(Italy) CAAL Racing	56	(Italy) Nicolò Rocca	All
Chevrolet	Chevrolet SS	(Austria) DF1 Racing	66	(Austria) Mathias Lauda	1–2
Chevrolet	Chevrolet SS	(Austria) DF1 Racing	66	(Brazil) William Ayer, Jr.	3
Chevrolet	Chevrolet SS	(Austria) DF1 Racing	66	(United Kingdom) Freddie Hunt	5
Chevrolet	Chevrolet SS	(Austria) DF1 Racing	88	(Italy) Simone Monforte	1–2
Chevrolet	Chevrolet SS	(Italy) Eurokart Racing Team	88	(Italy) Simone Monforte	5–6
Ford	Ford Mustang	(Spain) SPV Racing	1	(Spain) Borja García	1–4
Ford	Ford Mustang	(Spain) SPV Racing	1	(Russia) Roman Mavlanov	5
Ford	Ford Mustang	(Spain) SPV Racing	1	(Brazil) Felipe Rabello	6
Ford	Ford Mustang	(Spain) SPV Racing	69	(Brazil) William Ayer, Jr.	1
Ford	Ford Mustang	(Spain) SPV Racing	69	(Slovakia) Christian Malchárek	3
Ford	Ford Mustang	(Spain) SPV Racing	69	(Sweden) Lars Lindberg	4
Ford	Ford Mustang	(Spain) SPV Racing	69	(Italy) Carlo Forte	5
Ford	Ford Mustang	(France) RDV Compétition	3	(France) Frédéric Gabillon	All
Ford	Ford Mustang	(France) RDV Compétition	31	(France) Ulysse Delsaux	All
Ford	Ford Mustang	(France) RDV Compétition	47	(Brazil) Marconi de Abreu	All
Ford	Ford Mustang	(Italy) Scuderia Giudici	4	(Italy) Claudio Giudici	2
Ford	Ford Mustang	(Austria) Dexwet Renauer Team	5	(Austria) Florian Renauer	1–3
Ford	Ford Mustang	(Austria) Dexwet Renauer Team	5	(Czech Republic) Martin Doubek	5–6
Ford	Ford Mustang	(Austria) Dexwet Renauer Team	15	(Russia) Roman Mavlanov	1
Ford	Ford Mustang	(Austria) Dexwet Renauer Team	15	(Austria) Peter Gross	3, 5–6
Ford	Ford Mustang	(Italy) Double T by MRT Nocentini	6	(Italy) Carlo Forte	1–3
Ford	Ford Mustang	(Italy) Double T by MRT Nocentini	6	(Spain) Borja García	5
Ford	Ford Mustang	(Italy) Double T by MRT Nocentini	7	(Italy) Riccardo Geltrude	1–5
Ford	Ford Mustang	(Italy) Double T by MRT Nocentini	7	(Spain) Borja García	6
Ford	Ford Mustang	(Italy) Double T by MRT Nocentini	9	(Italy) Gianmarco Ercoli	All
Ford	Ford Mustang	(Italy) Double T by MRT Nocentini	12	(Italy) Gian Maria Gabbiani	All
Ford	Ford Mustang	(Italy) Vict Motorsport	8	(Italy) Dario Caso	All
Ford	Ford Mustang	(Monaco) Alex Caffi Motorsports	23	(Monaco) Alex Caffi	5–6
Ford	Ford Mustang	(France) Knauf Racing Team	37	(France) Thomas Ferrando	All
Ford	Ford Mustang	(France) Knauf Racing Team	73	(France) Wilfried Boucenna	All
Ford	Ford Mustang	(Belgium) Brass Racing	78	(Belgium) Jerry De Weerdt	All
Ford	Ford Mustang	(Belgium) Brass Racing	90	(Belgium) Marc Goossens	1–3, 5–6
Ford	Ford Mustang	(Belgium) Motorsport 98	98	(Belgium) Eric De Doncker	1–3, 5–6

=== Elite 2 Division ===
Manufacturer	Car	Team	No.	Race Driver	Rounds
Chevrolet	Chevrolet SS	(Belgium) PK Carsport	11	(Belgium) Stienes Longin	1–3, 5–6
Chevrolet	Chevrolet SS	(Belgium) PK Carsport	24	(Switzerland) Gabriele Gardel	All
Chevrolet	Chevrolet SS	(Belgium) PK Carsport	46	(Slovakia) Christian Malchárek	1
Chevrolet	Chevrolet SS	(Netherlands) Raceway Venray	14	(Germany) Marko Stipp	2, 6
Chevrolet	Chevrolet SS	(Netherlands) Raceway Venray	21	(Netherlands) Maik Barten	2
Chevrolet	Chevrolet SS	(Netherlands) Raceway Venray	21	(Belgium) Guillaume Deflandre	6
Chevrolet	Chevrolet SS	(Austria) Dexwet Renauer Team	26	(Austria) Willy Gruber	All
Chevrolet	Chevrolet SS	(Monaco) Alex Caffi Motorsports	33	(Germany) Mirco Schultis	6
Chevrolet	Chevrolet SS	(Italy) CAAL Racing	44	(Germany) Justin Kunz	All
Chevrolet	Chevrolet SS	(Italy) CAAL Racing	54	(Spain) Salvador Tineo Arroyo	All
Chevrolet	Chevrolet SS	(Italy) CAAL Racing	56	(Belgium) Guillaume Deflandre	1–4
Chevrolet	Chevrolet SS	(Italy) CAAL Racing	56	(Italy) Arianna Casoli	5–6
Chevrolet	Chevrolet SS	(Austria) DF1 Racing	66	(United Kingdom) Freddie Hunt	1–3, 6
Chevrolet	Chevrolet SS	(Austria) DF1 Racing	66	(Belgium) Guillaume Deflandre	5
Chevrolet	Chevrolet SS	(Austria) DF1 Racing	88	(France) Alexandre Guiod	1
Chevrolet	Chevrolet SS	(Austria) DF1 Racing	88	(Russia) Roman Mavlanov	2–3
Chevrolet	Chevrolet SS	(Italy) Eurokart Racing Team	88	(Italy) Erika Monforte	5–6
Ford	Ford Mustang	(Spain) SPV Racing	1	(United Kingdom) Shawn Paul Wakefield	1–4
Ford	Ford Mustang	(Spain) SPV Racing	1	(Russia) Roman Mavlanov	5–6
Ford	Ford Mustang	(Spain) SPV Racing	69	(Algeria) Rayane Ait-Adjedjou	1
Ford	Ford Mustang	(Spain) SPV Racing	69	(Slovakia) Christian Malchárek	3
Ford	Ford Mustang	(Spain) SPV Racing	69	(Sweden) Lars Lindberg	4
Ford	Ford Mustang	(Spain) SPV Racing	69	(United Kingdom) Shawn Paul Wakefield	5–6
Ford	Ford Mustang	(France) RDV Compétition	3	(France) Hugo Bec	All
Ford	Ford Mustang	(France) RDV Compétition	31	(France) Didier Bec	All
Ford	Ford Mustang	(France) RDV Compétition	47	(Brazil) Marconi de Abreu	All
Ford	Ford Mustang	(Italy) Scuderia Giudici	4	(Italy) Claudio Giudici	2
Ford	Ford Mustang	(Austria) Dexwet Renauer Team	5	(Czech Republic) Martin Doubek	1–3, 5–6
Ford	Ford Mustang	(Austria) Dexwet Renauer Team	15	(Russia) Roman Mavlanov	1
Ford	Ford Mustang	(Austria) Dexwet Renauer Team	15	(Austria) Peter Gross	3, 5–6
Ford	Ford Mustang	(Italy) Double T by MRT Nocentini	6	(Italy) Marco Spinelli	1–2
Ford	Ford Mustang	(Italy) Double T by MRT Nocentini	6	(Italy) Erika Monforte	3
Ford	Ford Mustang	(Italy) Double T by MRT Nocentini	6	(Italy) Giovanni Altoè	5
Ford	Ford Mustang	(Italy) Double T by MRT Nocentini	7	(Italy) Riccardo Geltrude	All
Ford	Ford Mustang	(Italy) Double T by MRT Nocentini	9	(Italy) Simone Laureti	All
Ford	Ford Mustang	(Italy) Double T by MRT Nocentini	12	(Italy) Renzo Calcinati	All
Ford	Ford Mustang	(Italy) Vict Motorsport	8	(Italy) Arianna Casoli	1–4
Ford	Ford Mustang	(Italy) Vict Motorsport	8	(Italy) Dario Caso	5–6
Ford	Ford Mustang	(Belgium) PK Carsport	11	(Belgium) Stienes Longin	4
Ford	Ford Mustang	(Monaco) Alex Caffi Motorsports	23	(Monaco) Mauro Serra	5
Ford	Ford Mustang	(Monaco) Alex Caffi Motorsports	23	(Monaco) Luca Tosini	6
Ford	Ford Mustang	(France) Knauf Racing Team	37	(France) Thomas Ferrando	All
Ford	Ford Mustang	(France) Knauf Racing Team	73	(France) Paul Guiod	All
Ford	Ford Mustang	(Belgium) Brass Racing	78	(Belgium) Jerry De Weerdt	All
Ford	Ford Mustang	(Belgium) Motorsport 98	98	(Belgium) Eric De Doncker	1–3, 5–6

=== Driver changes ===
- Freddy Nordström moved from GDL Racing to CAAL Racing.
- Ander Vilariño will leave the series, leaving TFT Racing for other racing opportunities.

== Schedule and results ==
The schedule was announced in October 2015.

=== Elite 1 ===
Round		Race title	Track	Date	Pole position	Fastest lap	Winning driver	Winning manufacturer
1	R1	Valencia NASCAR Fest	(Spain) Circuit Ricardo Tormo, Valencia	23 April	(Belgium) Anthony Kumpen	(Israel) Alon Day	(Belgium) Anthony Kumpen	Chevrolet
1	R2	Valencia NASCAR Fest	(Spain) Circuit Ricardo Tormo, Valencia	24 April	(Israel) Alon Day	(France) Frédéric Gabillon	(Israel) Alon Day	Chevrolet
2	R3	Autospeedway American Style	(Netherlands) Raceway Venray, Venray	15 May	(Spain) Borja García	(Belgium) Anthony Kumpen	(France) Frédéric Gabillon	Ford
2	R4	Autospeedway American Style	(Netherlands) Raceway Venray, Venray	16 May	(Belgium) Anthony Kumpen	(Belgium) Anthony Kumpen	(Belgium) Anthony Kumpen	Chevrolet
3	R5	American SpeedFest	(United Kingdom) Brands Hatch (Indy), Swanley	11 June	(Belgium) Anthony Kumpen	(Israel) Alon Day	(Belgium) Anthony Kumpen	Chevrolet
3	R6	American SpeedFest	(United Kingdom) Brands Hatch (Indy), Swanley	12 June	(Israel) Alon Day	(France) Frédéric Gabillon	(Israel) Alon Day	Chevrolet
4	R7	Tours Motor Show	(France) Tours Speedway, Tours	25 June	(France) Frédéric Gabillon	(France) Frédéric Gabillon	(France) Frédéric Gabillon	Ford
4	R8	Tours Motor Show	(France) Tours Speedway, Tours	26 June	(France) Frédéric Gabillon	(France) Ulysse Delsaux	(France) Frédéric Gabillon	Ford
5	R9	American Speed Weekend Semi-finals	(Italy) Adria International Raceway, Adria	17 September	(Israel) Alon Day	(Israel) Alon Day	(Belgium) Anthony Kumpen	Chevrolet
5	R10	American Speed Weekend Semi-finals	(Italy) Adria International Raceway, Adria	18 September	(Israel) Alon Day	(Israel) Alon Day	(Israel) Alon Day	Chevrolet
6	R11	American Festival NASCAR Finals	(Belgium) Circuit Zolder, Heusden-Zolder	8 October	(Israel) Alon Day	(Spain) Borja García	(Belgium) Anthony Kumpen	Chevrolet
6	R12	American Festival NASCAR Finals	(Belgium) Circuit Zolder, Heusden-Zolder	9 October	(Spain) Borja García	(France) Frédéric Gabillon	(France) Frédéric Gabillon	Ford

Oval/Speedway
Road Course

=== Elite 2 ===
Round		Race title	Track	Date	Pole position	Fastest lap	Winning driver	Winning manufacturer
1	R1	Valencia NASCAR Fest	(Spain) Circuit Ricardo Tormo, Valencia	23 April	(Spain) Salvador Tineo Arroyo	(Belgium) Stienes Longin	(Belgium) Stienes Longin	Chevrolet
1	R2	Valencia NASCAR Fest	(Spain) Circuit Ricardo Tormo, Valencia	24 April	(Belgium) Stienes Longin	(Spain) Salvador Tineo Arroyo	(Belgium) Stienes Longin	Chevrolet
2	R3	Autospeedway American Style	(Netherlands) Raceway Venray, Venray	15 May	(Belgium) Stienes Longin	(Belgium) Stienes Longin	(Belgium) Stienes Longin	Chevrolet
2	R4	Autospeedway American Style	(Netherlands) Raceway Venray, Venray	16 May	(Belgium) Stienes Longin	(Belgium) Stienes Longin	(Belgium) Stienes Longin	Chevrolet
3	R5	American SpeedFest	(United Kingdom) Brands Hatch (Indy), Swanley	11 June	(Spain) Salvador Tineo Arroyo	(Spain) Salvador Tineo Arroyo	(Belgium) Stienes Longin	Chevrolet
3	R6	American SpeedFest	(United Kingdom) Brands Hatch (Indy), Swanley	12 June	(Spain) Salvador Tineo Arroyo	(France) Thomas Ferrando	(Spain) Salvador Tineo Arroyo	Chevrolet
4	R7	Tours Motor Show	(France) Tours Speedway, Tours	25 June	(Belgium) Stienes Longin	(Belgium) Stienes Longin	(Italy) Riccardo Geltrude	Ford
4	R8	Tours Motor Show	(France) Tours Speedway, Tours	26 June	(Belgium) Stienes Longin	(Belgium) Stienes Longin	(Belgium) Stienes Longin	Ford
5	R9	American Speed Weekend Semi-finals	(Italy) Adria International Raceway, Adria	17 September	(Switzerland) Gabriele Gardel	(Belgium) Stienes Longin	(Switzerland) Gabriele Gardel	Chevrolet
5	R10	American Speed Weekend Semi-finals	(Italy) Adria International Raceway, Adria	18 September	(Belgium) Stienes Longin	(Belgium) Stienes Longin	(Belgium) Stienes Longin	Chevrolet
6	R11	American Festival NASCAR Finals	(Belgium) Circuit Zolder, Heusden-Zolder	8 October	(Belgium) Stienes Longin	(Belgium) Stienes Longin	(Switzerland) Gabriele Gardel	Chevrolet
6	R12	American Festival NASCAR Finals	(Belgium) Circuit Zolder, Heusden-Zolder	9 October	(Belgium) Stienes Longin	(Spain) Salvador Tineo Arroyo	(Belgium) Stienes Longin	Chevrolet

Oval/Speedway
Road Course

== Standings ==
=== Elite 1 ===
(key) Bold - Pole position awarded by time. Italics - Fastest lap. * – Most laps led.

Pos	Driver	(Spain) VAL		(Netherlands) VEN		(United Kingdom) BRH		(France) TOU		(Italy) ADR		(Belgium) ZOL		Points
1	(Belgium) Anthony Kumpen	1	4	2	1	1	10	4	5	1	2	1	7	657
2	(France) Frédéric Gabillon	2	2	1	5	2	2	1	1	5	3	2	1	646
3	(Israel) Alon Day	6	1	16	13	3	1	16	4	2	1	7	3	614
4	(Italy) Nicolò Rocca	4	21	4	7	20	6	5	3	4	6	3	20	553
5	(Belgium) Bert Longin	7	9		11	10	11	10	7	3	4	19	8	535
6	(France) Thomas Ferrando	24	8	12	9	8	7	3	2	18	9	10	9	533
7	(France) Wilfried Boucenna	8	5	6	15	7	5	6	6	21	8	8	14	529
8	(Italy) Gianmarco Ercoli	5	13	14	4	11	9	11	13	22	10	4	5	525
9	(France) Ulysse Delsaux	11	24	9	19	12	14	7	10	8	20	9	10	496
10	(Sweden) Freddy Nordström	19	6	23	20	6	8	13	8	6	23	6	13	494
11	(Spain) Borja García	3	3	3	2	5	4	8	16	23	22	22	23	480
12	(Italy) Dario Caso	13	17	11	18	22	16	15	12	16	12	14	16	460
13	(Brazil) Marconi de Abreu	16	18	10	17	16	18	14	15	12	13	15	21	450
14	(Belgium) Jerry De Weerdt	17	15	22	16	17	17	17		13	15	17	18	433
15	(Austria) Willy Gruber	15	16	20	24	21		12	11	17	19	18	22	413
16	(Italy) Riccardo Geltrude	22	12	8	6	24	13	2	9	19	11			362
17	(Belgium) Marc Goossens	9	20	13	8	4	3					21	2	343
18	(Italy) Gian Maria Gabbiani	14	19	17	23	14	19	9	14	20	18			314
19	(Monaco) Alex Caffi									7	5	20	6	284
20	(Belgium) Eric De Doncker	12	11			13	12					11	12	262
21	(Italy) Carlo Forte	25	23	19	14	23	22			11	21			260
22	(Czech Republic) Martin Doubek									10	7	23	11	258
23	(Italy) Simone Monforte	23	10	21	21					9	16			235
24	(Netherlands) Barry Maessen			5	3							12	17	204
25	(Austria) Florian Renauer	21	7	7	10	9	21							189
26	(Austria) Peter Gross					19	23			14	17			170
27	(Netherlands) Renger van der Zande											5	4	158
28	(Brazil) William Ayer, Jr.	18	22			18	20							119
29	(United Kingdom) Freddie Hunt									15	14			118
30	(Netherlands) Maik Barten											13	13	116
31	(Brazil) Felipe Rabello											16	19	6
32	(Austria) Mathias Lauda	10	14											64
33	(Italy) Claudio Giudici			18	12									58
34	(Slovakia) Christian Malchárek					15	15							58
35	(United Kingdom) Colin White			15	22									51
36	(United States) Brandon Gdovic	20	25											6
37	(Russia) Roman Mavlanov	DNQ	DNQ											30

=== Elite 2 ===
(key) Bold - Pole position awarded by time. Italics - Fastest lap. * – Most laps led.

Pos	Driver	(Spain) VAL		(Netherlands) VEN		(United Kingdom) BRH		(France) TOU		(Italy) ADR		(Belgium) ZOL		Points
1	(Belgium) Stienes Longin	1	1	1	1	1	2	1	1	2	1	24	1	650
2	(Switzerland) Gabriele Gardel	4	23	11	4	23	6	5	5	1	2	1	5	604
3	(France) Thomas Ferrando	24	8	12	9	8	7	3	2	18	9	10	9	590
4	(Spain) Salvador Tineo Arroyo	2	2	4	5	3	1	4	6	19	3	17	2	571
6	(France) Hugo Bec	7	4	23	7	5	11	6	3	4	21	6	11	539
7	(Belgium) Guillaume Deflandre	3	3	24	10	4	22	12	4	14	23	7	8	504
8	(Czech Republic) Martin Doubek	9	6	9	9	24	23			5	4	3	6	500
9	(Brazil) Marconi de Abreu	11	10	16	6	12	20	11	13	10	10	12	13	499
10	(Germany) Justin Kunz	12	17	18		14	13	10	11	8	5	20	7	491
11	(Belgium) Jerry De Weerdt	13	13	14	20		9	13	16	11	11	10	15	486
12	(Italy) Renzo Calcinati	14	12	5		22	10	7	9	9	22	11	23	463
13	(France) Paul Guiod	15	14	21	12	9	8	9	8	18	19	8	22	463
14	(Russia) Roman Mavlanov	5	5	22	16	18	21			3	7	5	21	461
15	(France) Didier Bec	17	15	12	11	11	14	14	14	20	12	16	14	457
16	(Italy) Simone Laureti	10	16	19	13	13	12	8	15	DNQ	15	13	16	431
17	(Austria) Willy Gruber	16	21	10		15	DNQ	15	10	21	18	18	18	413
18	(United Kingdom) Shawn Paul Wakefield	20	20	13	19	20	16	16	12	17	20	21	19	406
19	(Italy) Arianna Casoli	19	18	17		21	19	17	17	15	17	19	20	404
20	(Belgium) Eric De Doncker	8	7				5					4	9	300
21	(Italy) Dario Caso									6	9	22	DNQ	220
22	(Germany) Marko Stipp			7	14							14	12	195
23	(Austria) Peter Gross					17	18			12	13			183
24	(Italy) Erika Monforte					16	15			13	14			183
25	(United Kingdom) Freddie Hunt	23	8	6	15	19	17							176
26	(Monaco) Luca Tosini											9	10	138
27	(Slovakia) Christian Malchárek	21	11			8	7							129
28	(Germany) Mirco Schultis											15	17	112
29	(Italy) Marco Spinelli	DNQ	9	8	18									108
30	(Italy) Giovanni Altoé									22	16			100
31	(Monaco) Mauro Serra									16	DNQ			76
32	(Netherlands) Maik Barten			15	8									65
33	(Italy) Claudio Giudici			20	17									51
34	(Algeria) Rayane Ait-Adjedjou	18	19											51
35	(France) Alexandre Guiod	DNQ	25											21

== See also ==
- 2016 NASCAR Sprint Cup Series
- 2016 NASCAR Xfinity Series
- 2016 NASCAR Camping World Truck Series
- 2016 NASCAR K&N Pro Series East
- 2016 NASCAR K&N Pro Series West
- 2016 NASCAR Whelen Modified Tour
- 2016 NASCAR Whelen Southern Modified Tour
- 2016 NASCAR Pinty's Series
