= Stienes Longin =

Belgian auto racing driver (born 1991)

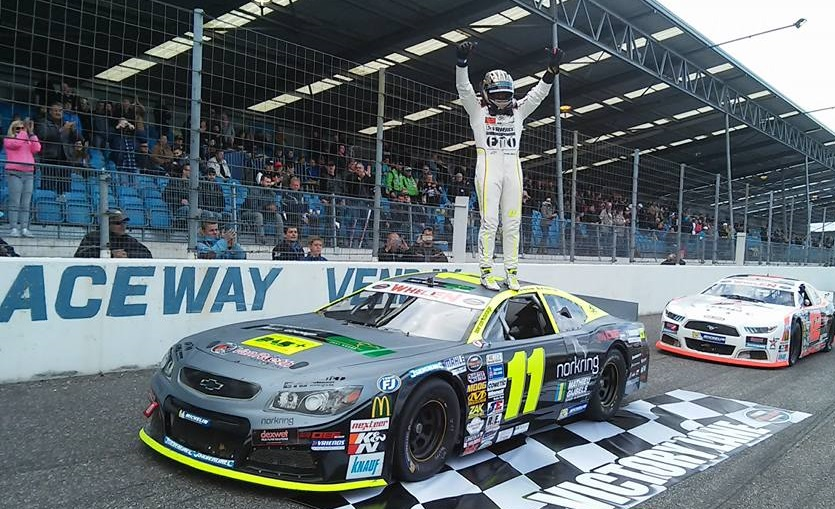
- Stienes Longin celebrates a race victory at Raceway Venray in 2016.
- Nationality: (Belgium) Belgian
- Born: July 30, 1991 (age 35) Leuven, Flemish Brabant
- Relatives: Bert Longin (father)

NASCAR Whelen Euro Series career
- Debut season: 2014 (Elite 2); 2017 (Elite 1)
- Current team: PK Carsport
- Car number: 11
- Engine: Chevrolet
- Starts: 28 (Elite 2); 37 (Elite 1)
- Championships: 1 (2016 Elite 2)
- Wins: 9 (Elite 2); 1 (Elite 1)
- Poles: 8 (Elite 2); 1 (Elite 1)
- Fastest laps: 9 (Elite 2); 1 (Elite 1)
- Best finish: 1st in 2016 (Elite 2)
- Finished last season: 2nd in 2019

Previous series
- 2016 2015 2014-2015: TCR BeNeLux Touring Car Championship; BMW M235i Racing Cup; Belgian Gentleman Drivers Club

Championship titles
- 2016 2015: NASCAR Whelen Euro Series – Elite 2 Belgian Gentleman Drivers Club - D3

Stienes Longin (born 30 July 1991 in Leuven, Flemish Brabant) is a Belgian professional racing driver. Longin currently competes in the NASCAR Whelen Euro Series driving the No. 11 Chevrolet Camaro for PK Carsport in the Elite 1 class and in Belcar Endurance Championship driving the No. 11 Norma M20 FC for Krafft Racing. He previously won the Euro Series Elite 2 championship in 2016. He is also a one-time winner at the 24 Hours of Zolder, having scored his first overall victory in 2019. He is the son of former FIA GT driver Bert Longin.

== Racing career ==
Longin started his racing career in the Belgian Racing Drivers Club. In 2013, he was fielded by Hoppa Racing in a Renault Clio. The following year, in a BMW M3, Longin won the championship in Division 3. In 2014, Longin made his debut in the NASCAR Whelen Euro Series as a part of the PK Carsport formation. At Tours Speedway Longin finished second, behind Denis Dupont, in the second Elite 2 race. At the Nürburgring the Belgian driver scored another two top-ten finishes. Longin's first appearance at the 24 Hours of Zolder came in 2014. The Belgian driver made his debut for the Australian MARC Cars formation with teammates Kris Van Kelst, Ryan McLeod, Hadrian Morall, and Mich Benton. The team finished twelfth overall, second in class.

In 2015, Longin combined a full season in the NASCAR Whelen Euro Series with a partial season in the Belgian Racing Drivers Club. In the BGDC, Longin won at Circuit Zolder, Dijon-Prenois and Spa-Francorchamps. He won his first NASCAR race at Tours Speedway. Scoring another five podium finishes he secured fourth place in the championship. Longin also participated in the revived Belcar Trophy in a BMW M235i Racing Cup. The team finished third in the second race of the season, placing fourth in the championship.

In the 2016 season, Longin dominated the Elite 2 class as he won eight races out of 12 on his way to win the Elite 2 championship that year. He moved up to the Elite 1 class the following year to replace his father Bert in PK Carsport's No. 11 team and would finish in fifth in the Championship having scored three podium finishes in his debut season in Elite 1. Longin once again finished in fifth in the Championship the following year having scored two podium finishes.

In the 2019 season, Longin scored his first pole position in the Elite 1 class at Brands Hatch before leading the Elite 1 Championship for the first time in his career at Most after scoring six second-place finishes in the first eight races of the season. Longin also won the 24 Hours of Zolder in the same year, scoring the win alongside his father Bert (who scored his sixth victory in the event, tying Anthony Kumpen and Marc Goossens for the most wins), Christoff Corten, and Giorgio Maggi. On the final race of the season at Circuit Zolder, Longin would score his first victory in the Elite 1 class in the rain-affected race to secure a second-place finish in the championship.

== Complete motorsports results ==
=== Complete 24 Hours of Zolder results ===
Year	Team	Co-Drivers	Car	Class	Laps	Pos.	Class Pos.
2014	MARC Cars Australia 2	(Australia) Mitch Benton (Australia) Ryan McLeod (Australia) Hadrian Morrall (Belgium) Kris van Kelst	MARC Ford Focus	S1	663	12th	**2nd**
2015	(Belgium) Tyre Set/Peka by PK Carsport	(Belgium) Maxime Dumarey (Belgium) Guillaume Dumarey (Belgium) Guido Dumarey (Netherlands) Max van Splunteren	BMW M235i Racing Cup	T7	723	8th	4th
2016	(Netherlands) Bas Koeten Racing	(Belgium) Thomas Piessens (Belgium) Sven van Laere (Qatar) Amro Al Hamad	Wolf GB08	2	658	17th	**3rd**
2017	(Belgium) PK Carsport	(Belgium) Anthony Kumpen (Belgium) Bert Longin (Belgium) Frank Beliën	Porsche 991	7a	519	33rd	4th
2018	(Belgium) PG Motorsport	(Belgium) Tijn Jilesen (Belgium) Marnik Battryn (Belgium) Johan Huygens	Porsche Cayman GT4	3	752	7th	**2nd**
2019	(Belgium) Krafft Racing	(Belgium) Bert Longin (Belgium) Christoff Corten (Switzerland) Giorgio Maggi	Norma M20FC	1	791	**1st**	**1st**

=== NASCAR ===
(key) (Bold – Pole position awarded by qualifying time. Italics – Pole position earned by points standings or practice time. * – Most laps led.)

==== Whelen Euro Series - Elite 1 ====
NASCAR Whelen Euro Series - Elite 1 results
Year	Team	No.	Make	1	2	3	4	5	6	7	8	9	10	11	12	13	NWES	Pts
2017	PK Carsport	11	Chevy	VAL; 2	VAL; 19	BRH; 7	BRH; 22	VEN; 8	VEN; 3	HOC; 7	HOC; 7	FRA; 5	FRA; 3	ZOL; 5	ZOL; 5		5th	569
2018	PK Carsport	11	Chevy	VAL; 4	VAL; 4	FRA; 7	FRA; 24	BRH; 16	BRH; 28	TOU; 4	TOU; 15	HOC; 21	HOC; 8	ZOL; 2	ZOL; 3		5th	419
2019	PK Carsport	11	Chevy	VAL; 2	VAL; 2	FRA; 8	FRA; 4	**BRH**; 2*	BRH; 2	MOS; 2	MOS; 2	VEN; 13	HOC; 25	HOC; 18	ZOL; 3	ZOL; 1*	2nd	502

==== Whelen Euro Series - Elite 2 ====
NASCAR Whelen Euro Series - Elite 2 results
Year	Team	No.	Make	1	2	3	4	5	6	7	8	9	10	11	12	NWES	Pts
2014	PK Carsport	11	Chevy	VAL	VAL	BRH	BRH	TOU; 4	TOU; 2	NÜR; 9	NÜR; 5	UMB	UMB	BUG	BUG	27th	156
2015	PK Carsport	11	Chevy	VAL; 2*	VAL; 8	VEN; 6	VEN; 4	BRH; 20	BRH; 3	TOU; 1*	TOU; 19	UMB; 2	UMB; 3	ZOL; 7	ZOL; 2	4th	621
2016	PK Carsport	11	Chevy	VAL; 1*	VAL; 1**	**VEN**; 1*	VEN; 1**	BRH; 1**	BRH; 2	**TOU**; 3	TOU; 1**	ADR; 2	ADR; 1*	**ZOL**; 24	ZOL; 1**	1st	650

Sporting positions
Preceded by Gianmarco Ercoli	NASCAR Whelen Euro Series Elite 2 Champion; 2016	Succeeded by Thomas Ferrando
