= Alon Day =

Israeli racing driver (born 1991)

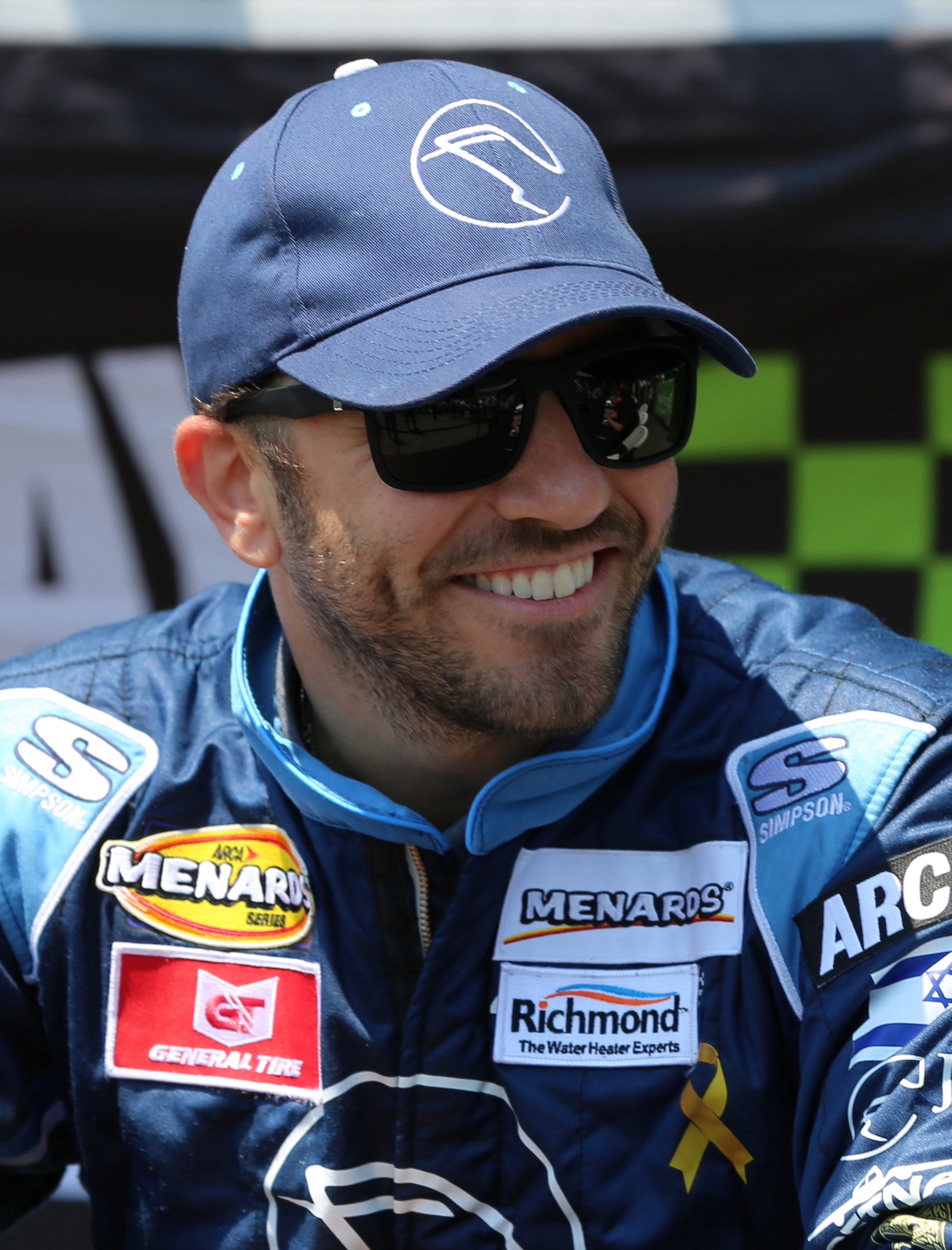
- Day at Sonoma Raceway in 2025
- Nationality: Israel
- Born: 4 November 1991 (age 35) Ashdod, Israel

NASCAR Whelen Euro Series career
- Debut season: 2015
- Categorisation: FIA Gold (until 2013); FIA Silver (2014–)
- Teams: CAAL Racing, PK Carsport
- Car number: 24
- Starts: 95
- Championships: 4 (2017, 2018, 2020, 2022)
- Wins: 32
- Poles: 37
- Fastest laps: 33
- Best finish: 1st in 2017, 2018, 2020, 2022

Previous series
- 2013–2014 2012 2010–2011 2011 2011 2008–2009 2008–2009 2007: FIA GT Series; Firestone Indy Lights; German Formula Three; Austria Formula 3 Cup; Formula 3 Euro Series; Asian Formula Renault; Formula BMW Pacific; Hungarian E-2000

Championship titles
- 2017–2018, 2020, 2022 2009: EuroNASCAR PRO Asian Formula Renault
- Height: 175 cm (5 ft 9 in)
- Weight: 66 kg (146 lb)

NASCAR Cup Series career
- 2 races run over 2 years
- 2018 position: 48th
- Best finish: 44th (2017)
- First race: 2017 Toyota/Save Mart 350 (Sonoma)
- Last race: 2018 Federated Auto Parts 400 (Richmond)
Wins	Top tens	Poles
0	0	0

NASCAR O'Reilly Auto Parts Series career
- 4 races run over 3 years
- 2025 position: 63rd
- Best finish: 63rd (2025)
- First race: 2016 Mid-Ohio Challenge (Mid-Ohio)
- Last race: 2025 Pacific Office Automation 147 (Portland)
Wins	Top tens	Poles
0	0	0

NASCAR FedEx Freight Truck Series career
- 2 races run over 1 year
- 2016 position: 62nd
- Best finish: 62nd (2016)
- First race: 2016 UNOH 175 (New Hampshire)
- Last race: 2016 Ford EcoBoost 200 (Homestead)
Wins	Top tens	Poles
0	0	0

ARCA Menards Series career
- 2 races run over 1 year
- Best finish: 59th (2025)
- First race: 2025 Lime Rock Park 100 (Lime Rock)
- Last race: 2025 General Tire 100 at The Glen (Watkins Glen)
Wins	Top tens	Poles
0	1	0

ARCA Menards Series West career
- 2 races run over 1 year
- Best finish: 26th (2025)
- First race: 2025 General Tire 200 (Sonoma)
- Last race: 2025 Portland 112 (Portland)
Wins	Top tens	Poles
0	2	0
- Statistics up to date as of November 2, 2025.

Alon Day (Hebrew: אלון דאי; born 4 November 1991) is an Israeli professional stock car racing driver. Day is a record four-time European Champion in the NASCAR Euro Series. He last competed part-time in the NASCAR Xfinity Series, competing in the No. 24 Toyota GR Supra for Sam Hunt Racing, and part-time in the ARCA Menards Series, driving the No. 25 Toyota Camry for Venturini Motorsports, and part-time in the ARCA Menards Series West, driving the same car for the same team. Day is the first Israeli driver to compete in an IndyCar-sanctioned series and is also the first Israeli to compete in one of NASCAR's top three touring series.

== Early life ==
Day was born and grew up in Ashdod, Israel, and currently resides in Tel Aviv, Israel, and is Jewish. His father, Avi Day, owns a geological-engineering company involved in mineral drilling, and his mother Maggi originally immigrated to Israel from France. He began his racing career with go-karts at the age of 10. For his bar mitzvah, his father gave him as a present a karting vehicle that cost NIS 20,000.

After high school, Day performed three years of military service in the Israel Defense Forces (IDF). He was recognized by the IDF as an outstanding sportsman, the only Israeli in a Formula sport to be accorded that status. He was accepted into the Israeli Air Force pilots' training course, but gave it up because of his career. If he were not a racing car driver, he would want to be a fighter pilot.

== Racing career ==
Day won the Asian Formula Renault Challenge championship in 2009, when he was seventeen years old. He then drove in the German Formula Three Championship in 2010, racing with the Performance Racing team. He finished ninth in points, with a best finish of fourth (twice).

Day returned to the series in 2011 driving for HS Engineering. He improved to fourth in points and captured two podium finishes in third place. He also won the pole for the second race at Sachsenring. He made six starts in Formula 3 Euro Series (two race meets – Norisring and Silverstone Circuit) and drove in two races in Austria Formula 3 Cup, good enough for eighth in that championship.

In 2012, Day's career transitioned to North America, where he signed to drive in the Firestone Indy Lights series with Belardi Auto Racing. Day made six starts for the team before they amicably parted ways in June after qualifying at the Iowa Speedway. He was sponsored by the Jewish Racing Drivers Association.

In 2015, Day made his NASCAR debut in the season opener at Valencia, posting a top-ten finish. He attained his first NASCAR win at Magione in the semifinals. At the Circuit Zolder Finals weekend, he won the Junior "Jerome Sarran" Trophy. He also won the 2015 NASCAR Whelen Euro Series Most Popular Driver Award.

In 2016, Day won his fourth career NASCAR race in the opening weekend in Valencia, won the second race of the season at Brands Hatch, and at Zolder, he won the Junior Trophy classification. He also won the 2016 NASCAR Whelen Euro Series Most Popular Driver Award.

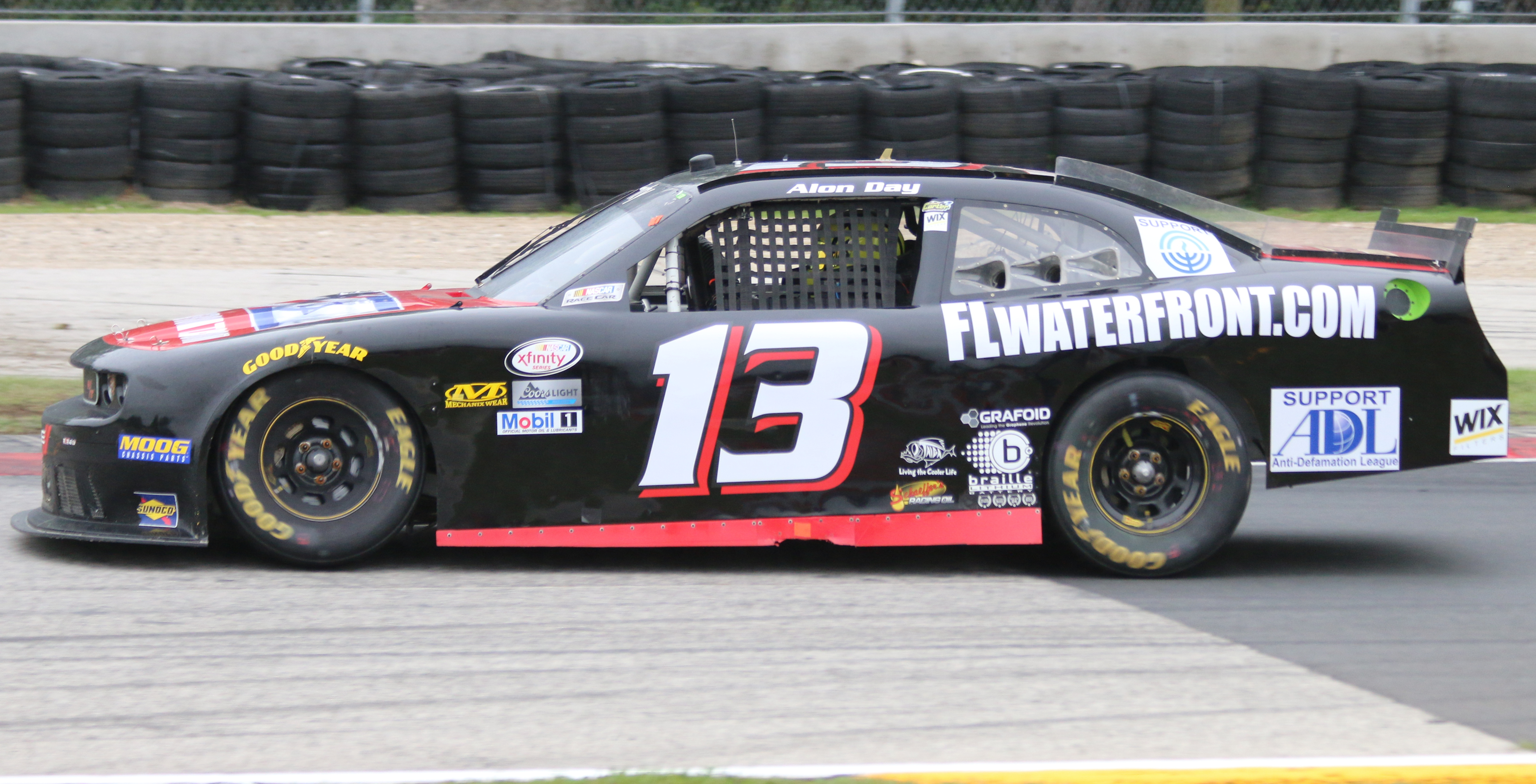
Day in his Xfinity Series car at Road America in 2016.

Also in 2016, Day was named one of the eleven members of the 2016–17 NASCAR Next program, which recognizes young, successful drivers from around the world who are seeking to improve. Day was the first driver of NASCAR's European circuit (the Whelen Euro Series) to earn the honor. In August, he joined MBM Motorsports for his Xfinity Series debut at Mid-Ohio Sports Car Course, making Day the first Israeli to compete in a major NASCAR touring series. The effort was supported by Jewish Sarasota, Florida, environmental/waterfront property lawyer David Levin, who provided Day with $60,000 from his retirement account to fund the car. After qualifying 22nd, Day capitalized on the rainy conditions to enter the top-ten, where he ran for most of the race before finishing thirteenth. Day returned at Road America, driving the No. 13 for MBM and finishing 30th after he was forced off course late in the race. In September, Contreras Motorsports hired Day to make his Camping World Truck Series debut at the New Hampshire Motor Speedway, in which he finished 24th.

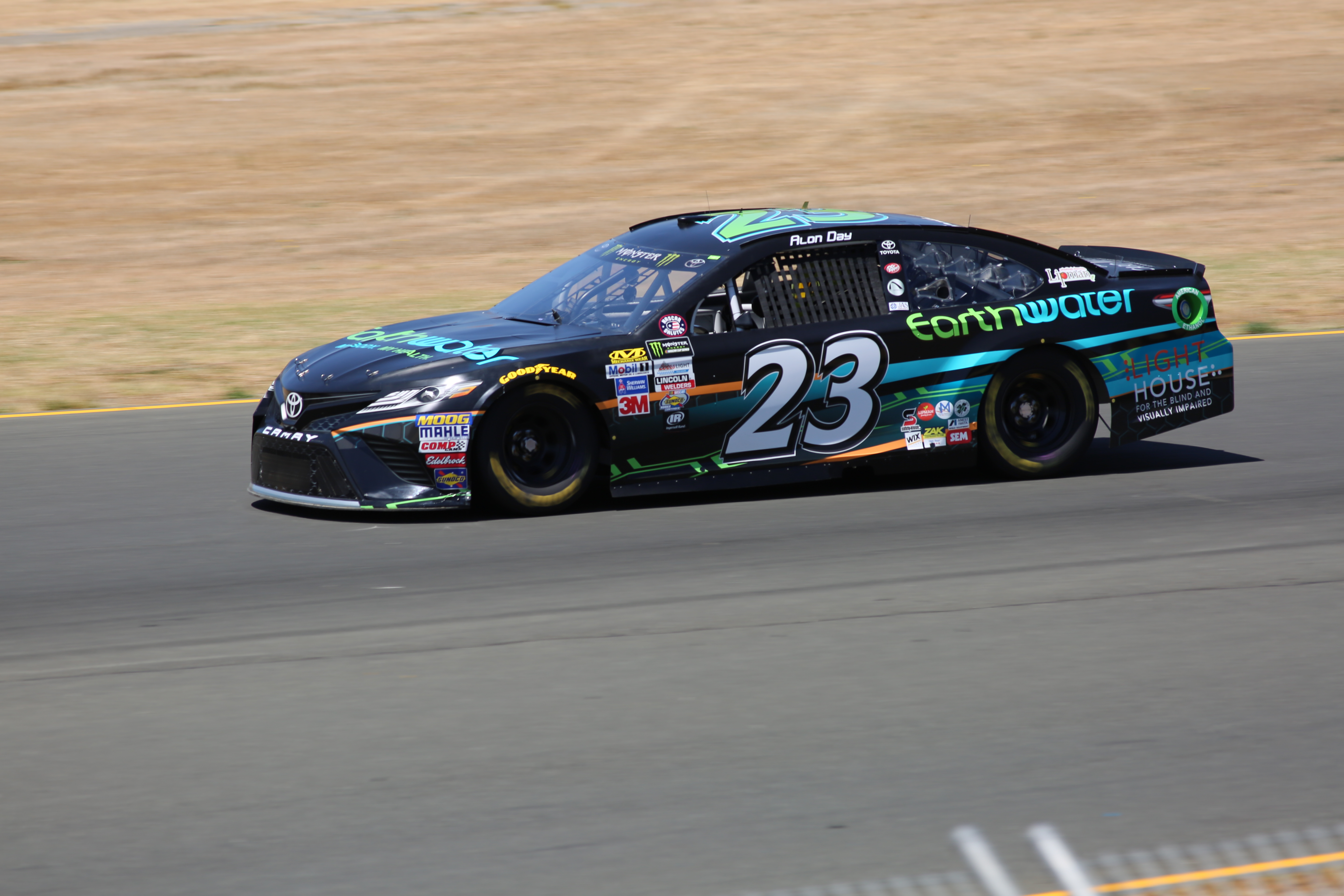
Day made his Monster Energy NASCAR Cup Series debut at Sonoma Raceway in 2017

In January 2017, Day was recognized by Israel's Ministry Of Culture and Sport as Israel's Athlete Of The Year in the motorsports category. On 11 June, Day won the NASCAR Whelen Euro race in England on 11 June at Brands Hatch. Later in June, Day joined BK Racing for his Monster Energy NASCAR Cup Series debut in Sonoma Raceway's Toyota/Save Mart 350, driving the No. 23 Toyota Camry. After starting 32nd, he finished in the same position. He became the first Israeli to compete in a Cup Series race. In mid-October, following a fourth-place finish at the second final of the NASCAR Whelen Euro race at Circuit Zolder, he became the first Israeli driver to win a NASCAR championship, clinching the 2017 championship title after only completing just the first lap, finishing the final standings 53 points ahead of defending and two-time series champion Anthony Kumpen.

On 17 September 2018, it was announced that Day would return to the NASCAR Cup Series driving the No. 23 Camry for BK Racing at Richmond.

In the 2019 season, Day started his season strongly after he won both races at Franciacorta and the first race at Brands Hatch. However, he would retire from both races at Most after he collided with Jacques Villeneuve in the first race and was involved in a first corner incident in the second race. Another troublesome week at Hockenheim would follow, where Day received a post-race time penalty for colliding with Stienes Longin in the first race before retiring from the lead in the second race. Day would eventually finish the season in fourth place with three wins, six podium finishes, and nine top-ten finishes.

On 4 October 2020, Day won his first EuroNASCAR contest of the season at Zolder and also assumed the points lead.

== Racing record ==
=== Career summary ===
Season	Series	Team	Races	Wins	Poles	F/Laps	Podiums	Points	Position
2008	Asian Formula Renault Challenge	Asia Racing Team	2	0	0	1	0	0	NC†
2009	Asian Formula Renault Challenge	March 3 Racing	6	4	2	3	5	293	**1st**
2009	Asian Formula Renault Challenge	Top Speed Racing Team	8	2	2	4	8	293	**1st**
2009	Formula BMW Pacific	Asia Racing Team	1	0	0	0	0	0	NC†
2010	German Formula 3 Championship	Performance Racing	18	0	0	0	0	26	9th
2011	German Formula 3 Championship	HS Technik Motorsport	18	0	1	2	2	62	4th
2011	Formula 3 Euro Series	Team HS-Engineering	6	0	0	0	0	0	NC†
2011	Austria Formula 3 Cup	Team HS-Engineering	2	2	0	0	2	40	8th
2012	Indy Lights	Belardi Auto Racing	6	0	0	0	0	147	12th
2013	FIA GT Series	HTP Gravity Charouz	12	1	0	1	5	80	5th
2014	ADAC GT Masters	BKK Mobil Oil Racing Team Zakspeed	14	0	0	1	2	60	15th
2014	Blancpain GT Sprint Series	Zakspeed	2	0	0	0	0	1	28th
2015	NASCAR Whelen Euro Series	CAAL Racing	12	3	4	3	4	627	**2nd**
2016	NASCAR Whelen Euro Series	CAAL Racing	12	3	5	3	6	614	**3rd**
2016	NASCAR Xfinity Series	MBM Motorsports	1	0	0	N/A	N/A	0†	109th
2016	NASCAR Camping World Truck Series	Contreras Motorsports	1	0	0	N/A	N/A	16	62nd
2017	NASCAR Whelen Euro Series	CAAL Racing	12	4	5	4	8	661	**1st**
2017	Monster Energy NASCAR Cup Series	BK Racing	1	0	0	N/A	N/A	5	44th
2018	NASCAR Whelen Euro Series	CAAL Racing	12	7	6	3	9	512	**1st**
2018	Monster Energy NASCAR Cup Series	BK Racing	1	0	0	N/A	N/A	1	48th
2019	NASCAR Whelen Euro Series	CAAL Racing	13	3	2	2	6	473	4th
2020	NASCAR Whelen Euro Series	PK Carsport	10	4	5	6	6	431	**1st**
2021	NASCAR Whelen Euro Series	CAAL Racing	12	3	3	2	5	367	6th
2022	NASCAR Whelen Euro Series	PK Carsport	10	5	5	5	7	425	**1st**
2022	NASCAR Whelen Euro Series	SpeedHouse	2	0	0	0	0	425	**1st**
2024	NASCAR Xfinity Series	Alpha Prime Racing	1	0	0	0	0	1	76th
2025	ARCA Menards Series	Venturini Motorsports	1	0	0	0	1	43	-*
2025	ARCA Menards Series West	Venturini Motorsports	1	0	0	0	1	41	-*
2026	Trans-Am Series - TA2								

^{†} Guest driver - Ineligible to score points.

=== Complete Formula 3 Euro Series results ===
(key) (Races in bold indicate pole position; races in italics indicate fastest lap)

Year	Entrant	Engine	1	2	3	4	5	6	7	8	9	10	11	12	13	14	15	16	17	18	19	20	21	22	23	24	25	26	27	D.C.	Points
2011	HS Engineering	Volkswagen	LEC; 1	LEC; 2	LEC; 3	HOC; 1	HOC; 2	HOC; 3	ZAN; 1	ZAN; 2	ZAN; 3	RBR; 1	RBR; 2	RBR; 3	NOR; 1; 8	NOR; 2; 7	NOR; 3; 12	NÜR; 1	NÜR; 2	NÜR; 3	SIL; 1; 11	SIL; 2 Ret	SIL; 3; 7	VAL; 1	VAL; 2	VAL; 3	HOC; 1	HOC; 2	HOC; 3	NC†	0†

† As Day was a guest driver, he was ineligible to score points.

=== Complete Indy Lights results ===
Year	Team	1	2	3	4	5	6	7	8	9	10	11	12	Rank	Points	Ref
2012	Belardi Auto Racing	STP; 12	ALA; 6	LBH; 11	INDY; 8	DET; 8	MIL; 7	IOW; DNS	TOR	EDM	TRO	BAL	FON	**12th**	**147**	

=== Complete FIA GT Series results ===
Year	Team	Car	Class	1	2	3	4	5	6	7	8	9	10	11	12	Pos.	Points	Ref
2013	HTP Gravity Charouz	Mercedes-Benz SLS AMG GT3	Pro	NOG; QR; 3	NOG; CR; 3	ZOL; QR; 7	ZOL; CR; Ret	ZAN; QR; 2	ZAN; CR; 1	SVK; QR; 10	SVK; CR; Ret	NAV; QR; Ret	NAV; CR; 7	BAK; QR; 12	BAK; CR; 4	5th	80	

=== NASCAR ===
(key) (Bold – Pole position awarded by qualifying time. Italics – Pole position earned by points standings or practice time. * – Most laps led. ** – All laps led.)

==== Monster Energy Cup Series ====
Monster Energy NASCAR Cup Series results
Year	Team	No.	Make	1	2	3	4	5	6	7	8	9	10	11	12	13	14	15	16	17	18	19	20	21	22	23	24	25	26	27	28	29	30	31	32	33	34	35	36	MENCC	Pts	Ref
2017	BK Racing	23	Toyota	DAY	ATL	LVS	PHO	CAL	MAR	TEX	BRI	RCH	TAL	KAN	CLT	DOV	POC	MCH	SON; 32	DAY	KEN	NHA	IND	POC	GLN	MCH	BRI	DAR	RCH	CHI	NHA	DOV	CLT	TAL	KAN	MAR	TEX	PHO	HOM	44th	5	
2018	BK Racing	23	Toyota	DAY	ATL	LVS	PHO	CAL	MAR	TEX	BRI	RCH	TAL	DOV	KAN	CLT	POC	MCH	SON	CHI	DAY	KEN	NHA	POC	GLN	MCH	BRI	DAR	IND	LVS	RCH; 38	ROV	DOV	TAL	KAN	MAR	TEX	PHO	HOM	48th	1	

==== Xfinity Series ====
NASCAR Xfinity Series results
Year	Team	No.	Make	1	2	3	4	5	6	7	8	9	10	11	12	13	14	15	16	17	18	19	20	21	22	23	24	25	26	27	28	29	30	31	32	33	NXSC	Pts	Ref
2016	MBM Motorsports	40	Dodge	DAY	ATL	LVS	PHO	CAL	TEX	BRI	RCH	TAL	DOV	CLT	POC	MCH	IOW	DAY	KEN	NHA	IND	IOW	GLN	MOH; 13	BRI												109th	0^{1}	
2016	MBM Motorsports	13	Dodge																							ROA; 30	DAR	RCH	CHI	KEN	DOV	CLT	KAN	TEX	PHO	HOM	109th	0^{1}	
2024	Alpha Prime Racing	45	Chevy	DAY	ATL	LVS	PHO	COA	RCH	MAR	TEX	TAL	DOV	DAR	CLT	PIR	SON	IOW	NHA	NSH	CSC; DNQ	POC	IND	MCH	DAY	DAR	ATL	GLN; 36	BRI	KAN	TAL	ROV	LVS	HOM	MAR	PHO	76th	1	
2025	Sam Hunt Racing	24	Toyota	DAY	ATL	COA	PHO	LVS	HOM	MAR	DAR	BRI	CAR	TAL	TEX	CLT	NSH	MXC	POC	ATL	CSC	SON	DOV	IND	IOW	GLN	DAY	PIR; 20	GTW	BRI	KAN	ROV	LVS	TAL	MAR	PHO	63rd	17	

==== Camping World Truck Series ====
NASCAR Camping World Truck Series results
Year	Team	No.	Make	1	2	3	4	5	6	7	8	9	10	11	12	13	14	15	16	17	18	19	20	21	22	23	NCWTC	Pts	Ref
2016	Contreras Motorsports	71	Chevy	DAY	ATL	MAR	KAN	DOV	CLT	TEX	IOW	GTW	KEN	ELD	POC	BRI	MCH	MSP	CHI	NHA; 24	LVS	TAL	MAR	TEX	PHO	HOM; 26	62nd	16	

^{*} Season still in progress
^{1} Ineligible for series points

==== Whelen Euro Series – EuroNASCAR PRO ====
(key) (Bold – Pole position. Italics – Fastest lap. * – Most laps led. ^ – Most positions gained)

NASCAR Whelen Euro Series – EuroNASCAR PRO results
Year	Team	No.	Make	1	2	3	4	5	6	7	8	9	10	11	12	13	NWES	Pts	Ref
2015	CAAL Racing	54	Chevy	VAL; 9	VAL; 19	VEN; 11	VEN; 9	BRH; 10	BRH; 3	TOU; 4	TOU; 8	**UMB**; 1**	UMB; 16	**ZOL**; 1**	**ZOL**; 1**		2nd	627	
2016	CAAL Racing	54	Chevy	VAL; 6	**VAL**; 1**	VEN; 16	VEN; 13	BRH; 3	**BRH**; 1**	TOU; 16	TOU; 4	**ADR**; 2	**ADR**; 1**	**ZOL**; 7	ZOL; 3		3rd	614	
2017	CAAL Racing	54	Chevy	VAL; 20	VAL; 3	BRH; 3	BRH; 1*	VEN; 3	VEN; 5	**HOC**; 4	**HOC**; 2	FRA; 1*	FRA; 1**	**ZOL**; 1**	**ZOL**; 4		1st	661	
2018	CAAL Racing	54	Chevy	**VAL**; 1*	VAL; 1*	**FRA**; 1*	**FRA**; 29										1st	512	
2018	CAAL Racing	54	Toyota					BRH; 21	BRH; 3	TOU; 2	**TOU**; 1*	HOC; 15	**HOC**; 1*	**ZOL**; 1*	**ZOL**; 1*		1st	512	
2019	CAAL Racing	54	Chevy	VAL; 3	VAL; 4	**FRA**; 1*	**FRA**; 1*	BRH; 1	BRH; 3	MOS; 20	MOS; 22	VEN; 8	HOC; 14	**HOC**; 26	ZOL; 6	ZOL; 2	4th	473	
2020	PK Carsport	24	Chevy	ITA; 2	ITA; 4	BEL; 3	BEL; 1*	CRO; 5	**CRO**; 1*	**ESP1**; 6	**ESP1**; 1	**ESP2**; 1*	**ESP2**; 4				1st	431	
2021	CAAL Racing	88	Chevy	ESP; 5	ESP; 19	**GBR**; 1*	GBR; 19	CZE; 1*	CZE; 17	CRO; 5	CRO; 3	BEL; 17	**BEL**; 1*	**ITA**; 19	ITA; 3		6th	367	
2022	PK Carsport	24	Chevy	ESP; 4	ESP; 1	GBR; 1	**GBR**; 16*	ITA; 1*	**ITA**; 2	**CZE**; 4	**CZE**; 1*			**CRO**; 1*	CRO; 3		1st	425	
2022	SpeedHouse	40	Ford									BEL; 11	BEL; 27				1st	425	

=== ARCA Menards Series ===
(key) (Bold – Pole position awarded by qualifying time. Italics – Pole position earned by points standings or practice time. * – Most laps led.)

ARCA Menards Series results
Year	Team	No.	Make	1	2	3	4	5	6	7	8	9	10	11	12	13	14	15	16	17	18	19	20	AMSC	Pts	Ref
2025	Venturini Motorsports	25	Toyota	DAY	PHO	TAL	KAN	CLT	MCH	BLN	ELK	LRP; 2	DOV	IRP	IOW	GLN; 11	ISF	MAD	DSF	BRI	SLM	KAN	TOL	59th	76	

==== ARCA Menards Series West ====
ARCA Menards Series West results
Year	Team	No.	Make	1	2	3	4	5	6	7	8	9	10	11	12	AMSWC	Pts	Ref
2025	Venturini Motorsports	25	Toyota	KER	PHO	TUC	CNS	KER	SON; 3	TRI	PIR; 3	AAS	MAD	LVS	PHO	26th	82	

== See also ==
- Sports in Israel
- List of Israelis
- List of Jews in sports

Sporting positions
Preceded by Anthony Kumpen	NASCAR Whelen Euro Series champion 2017–2018	Succeeded by Loris Hezemans
Preceded by Loris Hezemans	NASCAR Whelen Euro Series champion 2020	Succeeded by Loris Hezemans
Preceded by Loris Hezemans	NASCAR Whelen Euro Series champion 2022	Succeeded by Incumbent
