= 2018 Federated Auto Parts 400 =

Race details
- Race 28 of 36 in the 2018 Monster Energy NASCAR Cup Series
- Date: September 22, 2018
- Location: Richmond Raceway in Richmond, Virginia
- Course: Permanent racing facility
- Course length: .75 miles (1.2 km)
- Distance: 400 laps, 300 mi (480 km)
- Average speed: 103.152 miles per hour (166.007 km/h)

Pole position
Driver	Kevin Harvick	Stewart–Haas Racing
- Time: 22.153

Most laps led
Driver	Martin Truex Jr.	Furniture Row Racing
- Laps: 163

Winner
No. 18	Kyle Busch	Joe Gibbs Racing

Television in the United States
- Network: NBCSN
- Announcers: Rick Allen, Jeff Burton, Steve Letarte and Dale Earnhardt Jr.
- Nielsen ratings: 1.0/1.1 (Overnight)

Radio in the United States
- Radio: MRN
- Booth announcers: Joe Moore, Jeff Striegle and Rusty Wallace
- Turn announcers: Dave Moody (Backstretch)

The 2018 Federated Auto Parts 400 was a Monster Energy NASCAR Cup Series race that was held on September 22, 2018, at Richmond Raceway in Richmond, Virginia. Contested over 400 laps on the .75-mile (1.21 km) D-shaped short track, it was the 28th race of the 2018 Monster Energy NASCAR Cup Series season, second race of the Playoffs and second race of the Round of 16.

== Report ==
=== Background ===
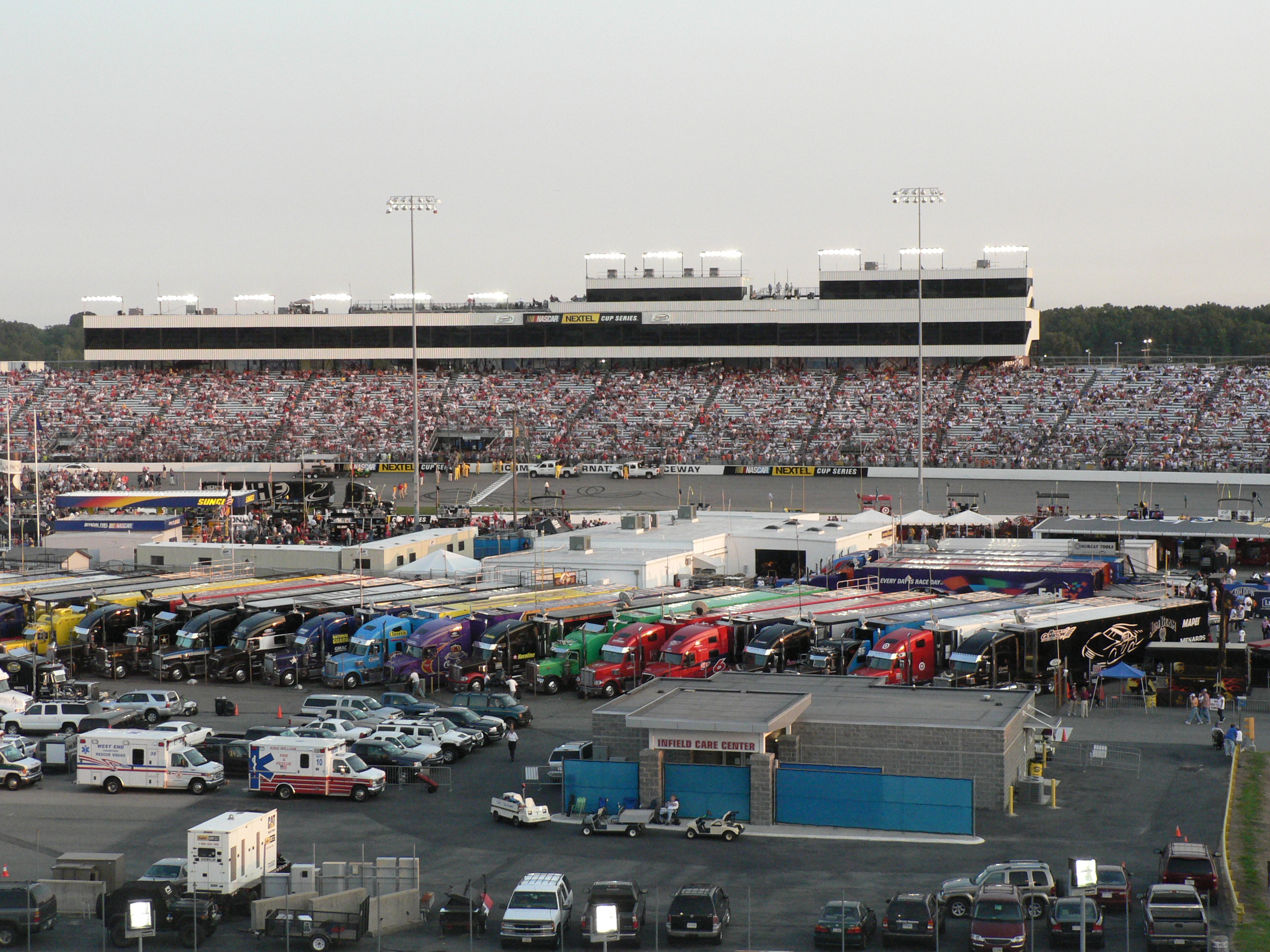
Richmond Raceway, the track where the race was held.

Richmond Raceway (RR), formerly known as Richmond International Raceway (RIR), is a 3/4-mile (1.2 km), D-shaped, asphalt race track located just outside Richmond, Virginia, in Henrico County. It hosts the Monster Energy NASCAR Cup Series and NASCAR Xfinity Series. Known as "America's premier short track", it formerly hosted a NASCAR Camping World Truck Series race, an IndyCar Series race and two USAC sprint car races.

==== Entry list ====
No.	Driver	Team	Manufacturer
00	Joey Gase (i)	StarCom Racing	Chevrolet
1	Jamie McMurray	Chip Ganassi Racing	Chevrolet
2	Brad Keselowski	Team Penske	Ford
3	Austin Dillon	Richard Childress Racing	Chevrolet
4	Kevin Harvick	Stewart–Haas Racing	Ford
6	Matt Kenseth	Roush Fenway Racing	Ford
9	Chase Elliott	Hendrick Motorsports	Chevrolet
10	Aric Almirola	Stewart–Haas Racing	Ford
11	Denny Hamlin	Joe Gibbs Racing	Toyota
12	Ryan Blaney	Team Penske	Ford
13	Ty Dillon	Germain Racing	Chevrolet
14	Clint Bowyer	Stewart–Haas Racing	Ford
15	Ross Chastain (i)	Premium Motorsports	Chevrolet
17	Ricky Stenhouse Jr.	Roush Fenway Racing	Ford
18	Kyle Busch	Joe Gibbs Racing	Toyota
19	Daniel Suárez	Joe Gibbs Racing	Toyota
20	Erik Jones	Joe Gibbs Racing	Toyota
21	Paul Menard	Wood Brothers Racing	Ford
22	Joey Logano	Team Penske	Ford
23	Alon Day	BK Racing	Toyota
24	William Byron (R)	Hendrick Motorsports	Chevrolet
31	Ryan Newman	Richard Childress Racing	Chevrolet
32	Matt DiBenedetto	Go Fas Racing	Ford
34	Michael McDowell	Front Row Motorsports	Ford
37	Chris Buescher	JTG Daugherty Racing	Chevrolet
38	David Ragan	Front Row Motorsports	Ford
41	Kurt Busch	Stewart–Haas Racing	Ford
42	Kyle Larson	Chip Ganassi Racing	Chevrolet
43	Bubba Wallace (R)	Richard Petty Motorsports	Chevrolet
47	A. J. Allmendinger	JTG Daugherty Racing	Chevrolet
48	Jimmie Johnson	Hendrick Motorsports	Chevrolet
51	Cole Custer (i)	Rick Ware Racing	Ford
52	Gray Gaulding	Rick Ware Racing	Ford
66	Timmy Hill (i)	MBM Motorsports	Toyota
72	Corey LaJoie	TriStar Motorsports	Chevrolet
78	Martin Truex Jr.	Furniture Row Racing	Toyota
88	Alex Bowman	Hendrick Motorsports	Chevrolet
95	Regan Smith	Leavine Family Racing	Chevrolet
96	Jeffrey Earnhardt	Gaunt Brothers Racing	Toyota
99	Landon Cassill (i)	StarCom Racing	Chevrolet
Official entry list

== Practice ==
=== First practice ===
Kyle Busch was the fastest in the first practice session with a time of 22.279 seconds and a speed of 121.190 mph (195.036 km/h).

Pos	No.	Driver	Team	Manufacturer	Time	Speed
1	18	Kyle Busch	Joe Gibbs Racing	Toyota	22.279	121.190
2	10	Aric Almirola	Stewart–Haas Racing	Ford	22.320	120.968
3	20	Erik Jones	Joe Gibbs Racing	Toyota	22.370	120.697
Official first practice results

=== Final practice ===
Brad Keselowski was the fastest in the final practice session with a time of 22.458 seconds and a speed of 120.224 mph (193.482 km/h).

Pos	No.	Driver	Team	Manufacturer	Time	Speed
1	2	Brad Keselowski	Team Penske	Ford	22.458	120.224
2	78	Martin Truex Jr.	Furniture Row Racing	Toyota	22.475	120.133
3	3	Austin Dillon	Richard Childress Racing	Chevrolet	22.602	119.458
Official final practice results

== Qualifying ==
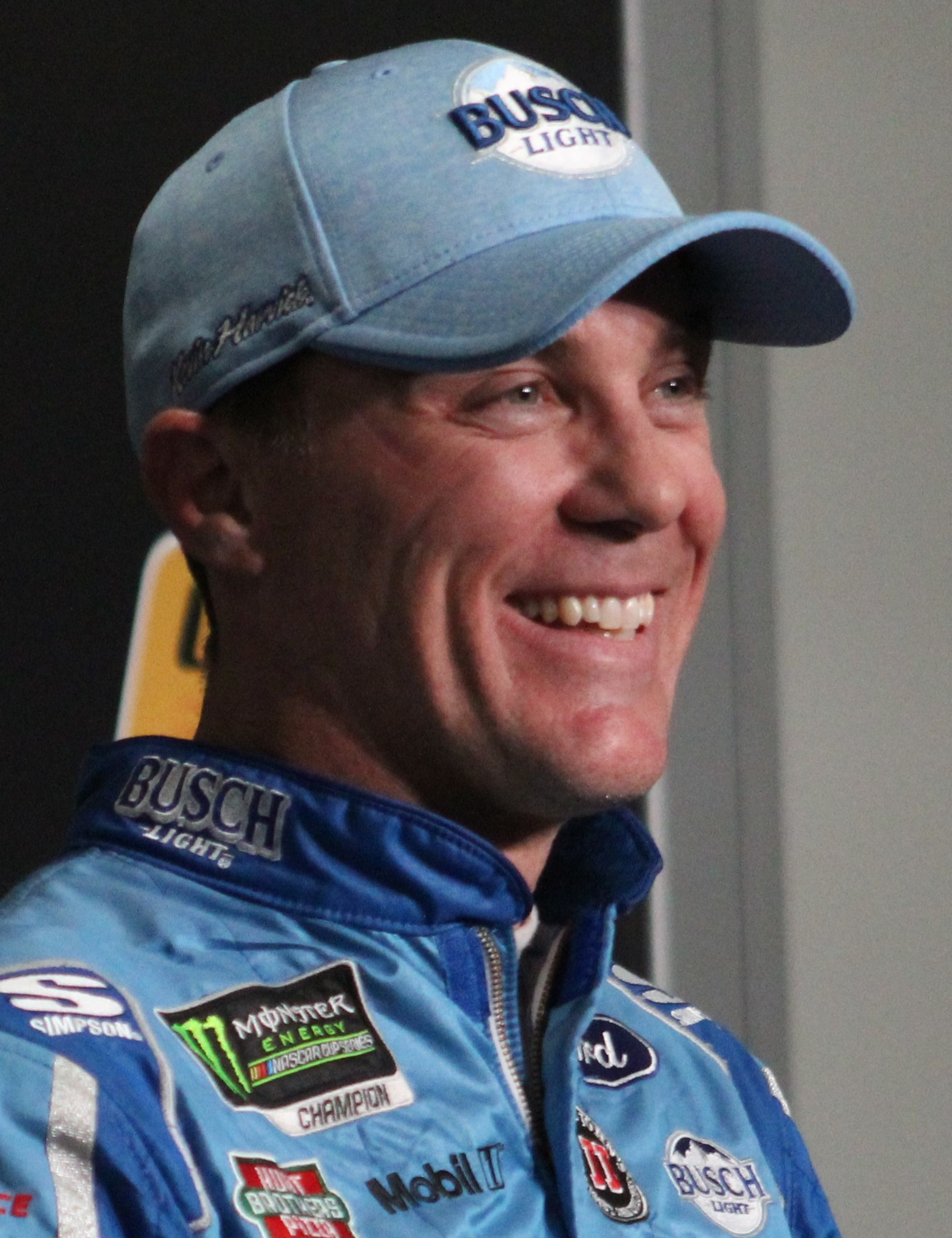
Kevin Harvick scored the pole position.

Kevin Harvick scored the pole for the race with a time of 22.153 and a speed of 121.880 mph (196.147 km/h).

=== Qualifying results ===
Pos	No.	Driver	Team	Manufacturer	R1	R2	R3
1	4	Kevin Harvick	Stewart–Haas Racing	Ford	22.148	22.194	22.153
2	11	Denny Hamlin	Joe Gibbs Racing	Toyota	22.014	22.182	22.159
3	78	Martin Truex Jr.	Furniture Row Racing	Toyota	22.113	22.161	22.217
4	12	Ryan Blaney	Team Penske	Ford	22.105	22.074	22.241
5	19	Daniel Suárez	Joe Gibbs Racing	Toyota	21.967	21.964	22.244
6	41	Kurt Busch	Stewart–Haas Racing	Ford	21.970	22.166	22.267
7	10	Aric Almirola	Stewart–Haas Racing	Ford	22.098	22.186	22.320
8	2	Brad Keselowski	Team Penske	Ford	22.001	22.162	22.342
9	20	Erik Jones	Joe Gibbs Racing	Toyota	22.054	22.185	22.342
10	42	Kyle Larson	Chip Ganassi Racing	Chevrolet	22.168	22.182	22.347
11	51	Cole Custer (i)	Rick Ware Racing	Ford	22.123	22.123	22.360
12	18	Kyle Busch	Joe Gibbs Racing	Toyota	22.093	22.199	22.390
13	22	Joey Logano	Team Penske	Ford	22.235	22.232	—
14	88	Alex Bowman	Hendrick Motorsports	Chevrolet	22.108	22.236	—
15	1	Jamie McMurray	Chip Ganassi Racing	Chevrolet	22.093	22.241	—
16	17	Ricky Stenhouse Jr.	Roush Fenway Racing	Ford	22.175	22.286	—
17	31	Ryan Newman	Richard Childress Racing	Chevrolet	22.269	22.297	—
18	6	Matt Kenseth	Roush Fenway Racing	Ford	22.025	22.318	—
19	9	Chase Elliott	Hendrick Motorsports	Chevrolet	22.066	22.332	—
20	24	William Byron (R)	Hendrick Motorsports	Chevrolet	22.244	22.354	—
21	21	Paul Menard	Wood Brothers Racing	Ford	22.195	22.374	—
22	48	Jimmie Johnson	Hendrick Motorsports	Chevrolet	22.240	22.438	—
23	37	Chris Buescher	JTG Daugherty Racing	Chevrolet	22.291	22.439	—
24	34	Michael McDowell	Front Row Motorsports	Ford	22.273	22.678	—
25	14	Clint Bowyer	Stewart–Haas Racing	Ford	22.305	—	—
26	43	Bubba Wallace (R)	Richard Petty Motorsports	Chevrolet	22.324	—	—
27	38	David Ragan	Front Row Motorsports	Ford	22.326	—	—
28	3	Austin Dillon	Richard Childress Racing	Chevrolet	22.348	—	—
29	32	Matt DiBenedetto	Go Fas Racing	Ford	22.355	—	—
30	47	A. J. Allmendinger	JTG Daugherty Racing	Chevrolet	22.373	—	—
31	13	Ty Dillon	Germain Racing	Chevrolet	22.407	—	—
32	15	Ross Chastain (i)	Premium Motorsports	Chevrolet	22.416	—	—
33	95	Regan Smith	Leavine Family Racing	Chevrolet	22.448	—	—
34	72	Corey LaJoie	TriStar Motorsports	Chevrolet	22.578	—	—
35	96	Jeffrey Earnhardt	Gaunt Brothers Racing	Toyota	22.601	—	—
36	52	Gray Gaulding	Rick Ware Racing	Ford	22.932	—	—
37	23	Alon Day	BK Racing	Toyota	22.954	—	—
38	00	Joey Gase (i)	StarCom Racing	Chevrolet	22.960	—	—
39	99	Landon Cassill (i)	StarCom Racing	Chevrolet	23.066	—	—
40	66	Timmy Hill (i)	MBM Motorsports	Toyota	23.079	—	—
Official qualifying results

- Kyle Busch, Daniel Suárez, Regan Smith, and David Ragan all started from the rear after failing inspection.

== Race ==
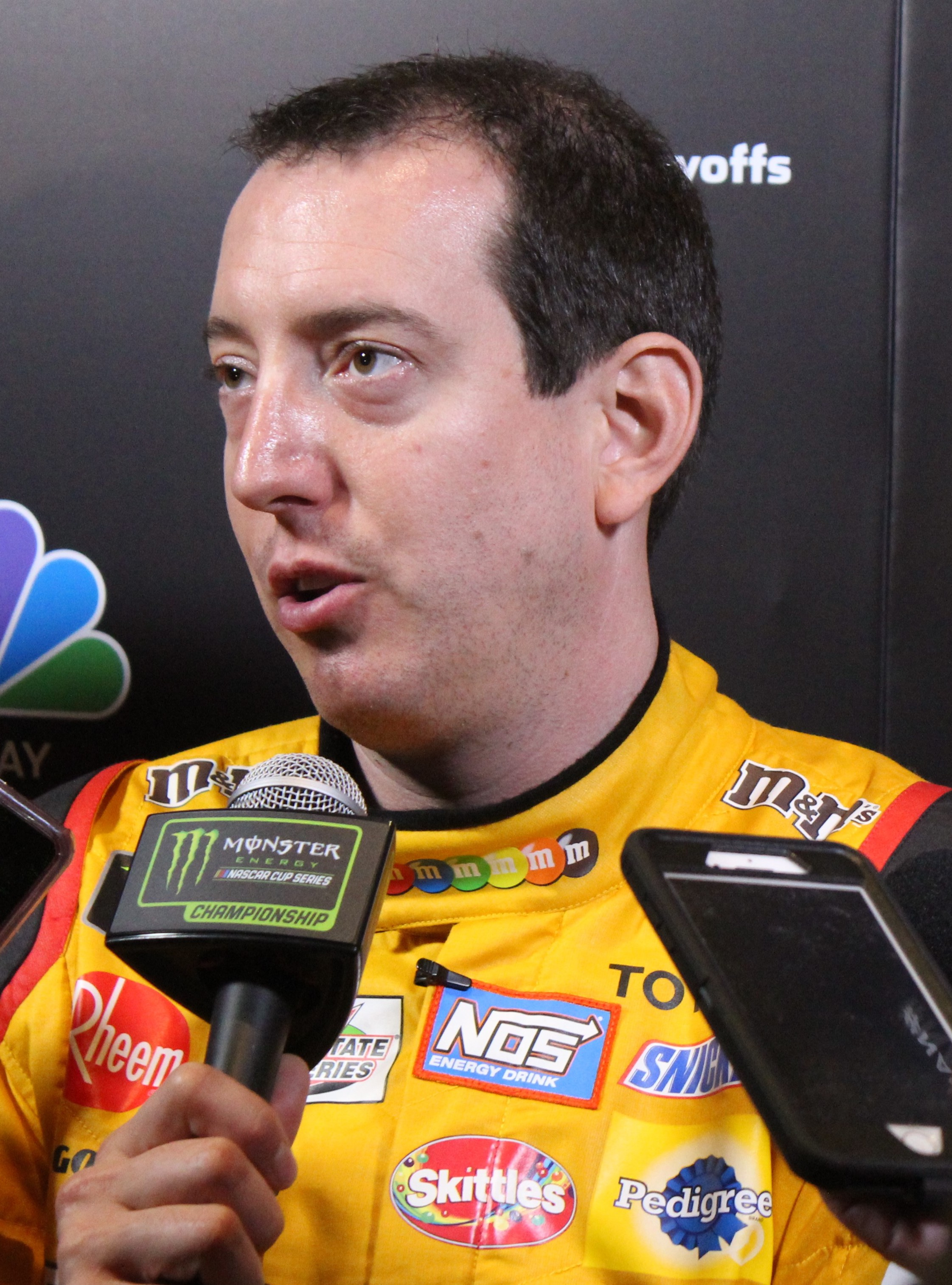
Kyle Busch won the race it was his 50th overall career cup series win.

=== Stage Results ===
Stage 1 Laps: 100

Pos	No	Driver	Team	Manufacturer	Points
1	78	Martin Truex Jr.	Furniture Row Racing	Toyota	10
2	4	Kevin Harvick	Stewart–Haas Racing	Ford	9
3	2	Brad Keselowski	Team Penske	Ford	8
4	9	Chase Elliott	Hendrick Motorsports	Chevrolet	7
5	41	Kurt Busch	Stewart–Haas Racing	Ford	6
6	10	Aric Almirola	Stewart–Haas Racing	Ford	5
7	20	Erik Jones	Joe Gibbs Racing	Toyota	4
8	88	Alex Bowman	Hendrick Motorsports	Chevrolet	3
9	11	Denny Hamlin	Joe Gibbs Racing	Toyota	2
10	22	Joey Logano	Team Penske	Ford	1
Official stage one results

Stage 2 Laps: 100

Pos	No	Driver	Team	Manufacturer	Points
1	78	Martin Truex Jr.	Furniture Row Racing	Toyota	10
2	4	Kevin Harvick	Stewart–Haas Racing	Ford	9
3	10	Aric Almirola	Stewart–Haas Racing	Ford	8
4	9	Chase Elliott	Hendrick Motorsports	Chevrolet	7
5	2	Brad Keselowski	Team Penske	Ford	6
6	88	Alex Bowman	Hendrick Motorsports	Chevrolet	5
7	3	Austin Dillon	Richard Childress Racing	Chevrolet	4
8	48	Jimmie Johnson	Hendrick Motorsports	Chevrolet	3
9	42	Kyle Larson	Chip Ganassi Racing	Chevrolet	2
10	22	Joey Logano	Team Penske	Ford	1
Official stage two results

=== Final Stage Results ===
Stage 3 Laps: 200

Pos	Grid	No	Driver	Team	Manufacturer	Laps	Points
1	11	18	Kyle Busch	Joe Gibbs Racing	Toyota	400	40
2	1	4	Kevin Harvick	Stewart–Haas Racing	Ford	400	53
3	3	78	Martin Truex Jr.	Furniture Row Racing	Toyota	400	54
4	18	9	Chase Elliott	Hendrick Motorsports	Chevrolet	400	47
5	6	10	Aric Almirola	Stewart–Haas Racing	Ford	400	45
6	26	3	Austin Dillon	Richard Childress Racing	Chevrolet	400	35
7	9	42	Kyle Larson	Chip Ganassi Racing	Chevrolet	400	32
8	21	48	Jimmie Johnson	Hendrick Motorsports	Chevrolet	400	32
9	7	2	Brad Keselowski	Team Penske	Ford	400	42
10	24	14	Clint Bowyer	Stewart–Haas Racing	Ford	400	27
11	8	20	Erik Jones	Joe Gibbs Racing	Toyota	400	30
12	13	88	Alex Bowman	Hendrick Motorsports	Chevrolet	400	33
13	15	17	Ricky Stenhouse Jr.	Roush Fenway Racing	Ford	400	24
14	12	22	Joey Logano	Team Penske	Ford	399	25
15	16	31	Ryan Newman	Richard Childress Racing	Chevrolet	399	22
16	2	11	Denny Hamlin	Joe Gibbs Racing	Toyota	399	23
17	38	19	Daniel Suárez	Joe Gibbs Racing	Toyota	399	20
18	5	41	Kurt Busch	Stewart–Haas Racing	Ford	398	25
19	4	12	Ryan Blaney	Team Penske	Ford	398	18
20	19	24	William Byron (R)	Hendrick Motorsports	Chevrolet	398	17
21	14	1	Jamie McMurray	Chip Ganassi Racing	Chevrolet	398	16
22	20	21	Paul Menard	Wood Brothers Racing	Ford	397	15
23	40	38	David Ragan	Front Row Motorsports	Ford	397	14
24	23	34	Michael McDowell	Front Row Motorsports	Ford	397	13
25	17	6	Matt Kenseth	Roush Fenway Racing	Ford	396	12
26	10	51	Cole Custer (i)	Rick Ware Racing	Ford	396	0
27	25	43	Bubba Wallace (R)	Richard Petty Motorsports	Chevrolet	395	10
28	29	13	Ty Dillon	Germain Racing	Chevrolet	395	9
29	28	47	A. J. Allmendinger	JTG Daugherty Racing	Chevrolet	394	8
30	22	37	Chris Buescher	JTG Daugherty Racing	Chevrolet	394	7
31	39	95	Regan Smith	Leavine Family Racing	Chevrolet	394	6
32	31	72	Corey LaJoie	TriStar Motorsports	Chevrolet	393	5
33	30	15	Ross Chastain (i)	Premium Motorsports	Chevrolet	392	0
34	27	32	Matt DiBenedetto	Go Fas Racing	Ford	391	3
35	35	00	Joey Gase (i)	StarCom Racing	Chevrolet	388	0
36	36	99	Landon Cassill (i)	StarCom Racing	Chevrolet	387	0
37	32	96	Jeffrey Earnhardt	Gaunt Brothers Racing	Toyota	387	1
38	34	23	Alon Day	BK Racing	Toyota	383	1
39	37	66	Timmy Hill (i)	MBM Motorsports	Toyota	382	0
40	33	52	Gray Gaulding	Rick Ware Racing	Ford	289	1
Official race results

=== Race statistics ===
- Lead changes: 8 among different drivers
- Cautions/Laps: 3 for 23
- Red flags: 0
- Time of race: 2 hours, 54 minutes and 30 seconds
- Average speed: 103.152 miles per hour (166.007 km/h)

== Media ==
=== Television ===
NBC Sports covered the race on the television side. Rick Allen, Jeff Burton, Steve Letarte and three-time Richmond winner Dale Earnhardt Jr. had the call in the booth for the race. Dave Burns, Marty Snider and Kelli Stavast will report from pit lane during the race.

NBCSN
Booth announcers	Pit reporters
Lap-by-lap: Rick Allen; Color-commentator: Jeff Burton; Color-commentator: Steve Letarte; Color-commentator: Dale Earnhardt Jr.	Dave Burns; Marty Snider; Kelli Stavast

=== Radio ===
The Motor Racing Network had the radio call for the race, which was simulcast on Sirius XM NASCAR Radio.

MRN
Booth announcers	Turn announcers	Pit reporters
Lead announcer: Joe Moore; Announcer: Jeff Striegle; Announcer: Rusty Wallace	Backstretch: Dave Moody	Alex Hayden; Winston Kelley; Steve Post

== Standings after the race ==
	Pos	Driver	Points
	1	Martin Truex Jr.	2,141
	2	Kyle Busch	2,125 (–16)
1	3	Kevin Harvick	2,113 (–28)
1	4	Brad Keselowski	2,111 (–30)
	5	Joey Logano	2,081 (–60)
3	6	Aric Almirola	2,079 (–62)
1	7	Kyle Larson	2,073 (–68)
2	8	Kurt Busch	2,071 (–70)
4	9	Chase Elliott	2,066 (–75)
	10	Austin Dillon	2,066 (–75)
1	11	Alex Bowman	2,061 (–80)
5	12	Ryan Blaney	2,060 (–81)
2	13	Clint Bowyer	2,056 (–85)
1	14	Jimmie Johnson	2,054 (–87)
	15	Erik Jones	2,039 (–102)
	16	Denny Hamlin	2,031 (–110)
Official driver's standings

Manufacturers' Championship standings

	Pos	Manufacturer	Points
1	1	Toyota	1,015
1	2	Ford	1,010 (–5)
	3	Chevrolet	915 (–100)
Official manufacturers' standings

- Note: Only the first 16 positions are included for the driver standings.

Previous race: 2018 South Point 400	Monster Energy NASCAR Cup Series; 2018 season	Next race: 2018 Bank of America Roval 400
