= 2018 Brickyard 400 =

2018 Big Machine Vodka 400 at the Brickyard
Race details
- Race 26 of 36 in the 2018 Monster Energy NASCAR Cup Series
- The 2018 Brickyard 400 program cover, celebrating the 25th anniversary of the race.
- Date: September 10, 2018
- Location: Indianapolis Motor Speedway in Speedway, Indiana
- Course: Permanent racing facility
- Course length: 2.5 miles (4.023 km)
- Distance: 160 laps, 400 mi (643.738 km)
- Average speed: 128.629 miles per hour (207.008 km/h)

Pole position
Driver	Kyle Busch	Joe Gibbs Racing

Most laps led
Drivers	Clint Bowyer	Stewart–Haas Racing
	Denny Hamlin	Joe Gibbs Racing
- Laps: 37

Winner
No. 2	Brad Keselowski	Team Penske

Television in the United States
- Network: NBCSN
- Announcers: Rick Allen, Steve Letarte (booth), Mike Bagley (Turn 2), Dale Earnhardt Jr. (Turn 3), Jeff Burton (Turn 4)

Radio in the United States
- Radio: IndyCar Radio Network
- Booth announcers: Doug Rice, Pat Patterson and Jeff Hammond
- Turn announcers: Mark Jaynes (1), Nick Yeoman (2), Jake Query (3) and Chris Denari (4)

The 2018 Brickyard 400, branded as Big Machine Vodka 400 at the Brickyard, was a Monster Energy NASCAR Cup Series race held on September 10, 2018, at Indianapolis Motor Speedway in Speedway, Indiana. The 25th running of the Brickyard 400, it was contested over 160 laps on the 2.5-mile (4.0-kilometre) speedway, and was the 26th race of the 2018 Monster Energy NASCAR Cup Series season, and the final race of the regular season before the playoffs.

== Report ==
=== Background ===
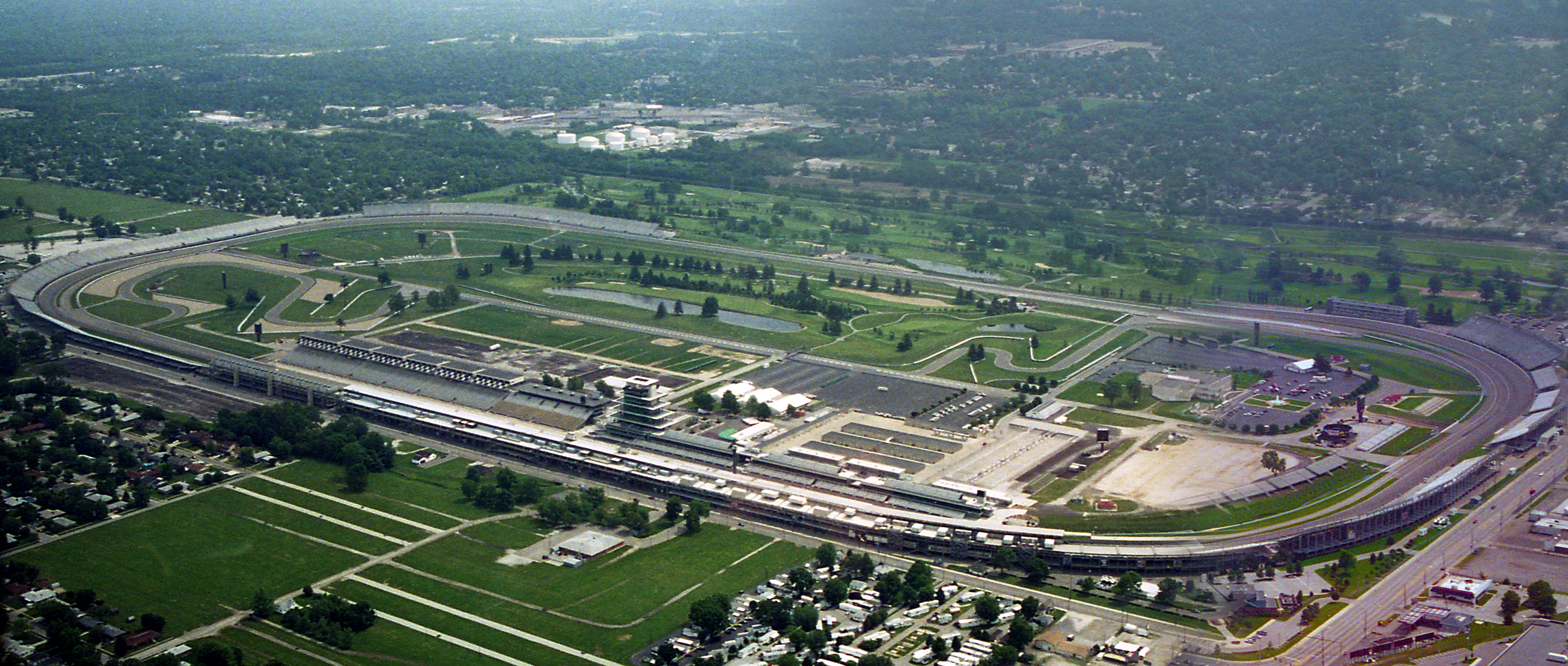
Indianapolis Motor Speedway, the track where the race will be held.

The Indianapolis Motor Speedway, located in Speedway, Indiana, (an enclave suburb of Indianapolis) in the United States, is the home of the Indianapolis 500 and the Brickyard 400. It is located on the corner of 16th Street and Georgetown Road, approximately 6 miles (10 kilometres) west of Downtown Indianapolis.

Constructed in 1909, it is the original speedway, the first racing facility so named. It has a permanent seating capacity estimated at 235,000 with infield seating raising capacity to an approximate 400,000. It is the highest-capacity sports venue in the world.

Considered relatively flat by American standards, the track is a 2.5-mile (4.0-kilometre), nearly rectangular oval with dimensions that have remained essentially unchanged since its inception: four 0.25-mile (0.40-kilometre) turns, two 0.625-mile-long (1.006-kilometre) straightaways between the fourth and first turns and the second and third turns, and two 0.125-mile (0.201-kilometre) short straightaways – termed "short chutes" – between the first and second, and third and fourth turns.

==== Entry list ====
No.	Driver	Team	Manufacturer
00	Landon Cassill (i)	StarCom Racing	Chevrolet
1	Jamie McMurray (W)	Chip Ganassi Racing	Chevrolet
2	Brad Keselowski	Team Penske	Ford
3	Austin Dillon	Richard Childress Racing	Chevrolet
4	Kevin Harvick (W)	Stewart–Haas Racing	Ford
6	Matt Kenseth	Roush Fenway Racing	Ford
7	Reed Sorenson	Premium Motorsports	Chevrolet
9	Chase Elliott	Hendrick Motorsports	Chevrolet
10	Aric Almirola	Stewart–Haas Racing	Ford
11	Denny Hamlin	Joe Gibbs Racing	Toyota
12	Ryan Blaney	Team Penske	Ford
13	Ty Dillon	Germain Racing	Chevrolet
14	Clint Bowyer	Stewart–Haas Racing	Ford
15	Ross Chastain (i)	Premium Motorsports	Chevrolet
17	Ricky Stenhouse Jr.	Roush Fenway Racing	Ford
18	Kyle Busch (W)	Joe Gibbs Racing	Toyota
19	Daniel Suárez	Joe Gibbs Racing	Toyota
20	Erik Jones	Joe Gibbs Racing	Toyota
21	Paul Menard (W)	Wood Brothers Racing	Ford
22	Joey Logano	Team Penske	Ford
23	J. J. Yeley (i)	BK Racing	Toyota
24	William Byron (R)	Hendrick Motorsports	Chevrolet
31	Ryan Newman (W)	Richard Childress Racing	Chevrolet
32	Matt DiBenedetto	Go Fas Racing	Ford
34	Michael McDowell	Front Row Motorsports	Ford
37	Chris Buescher	JTG Daugherty Racing	Chevrolet
38	David Ragan	Front Row Motorsports	Ford
41	Kurt Busch	Stewart–Haas Racing	Ford
42	Kyle Larson	Chip Ganassi Racing	Chevrolet
43	Bubba Wallace (R)	Richard Petty Motorsports	Chevrolet
47	A. J. Allmendinger	JTG Daugherty Racing	Chevrolet
48	Jimmie Johnson (W)	Hendrick Motorsports	Chevrolet
51	David Starr (i)	Rick Ware Racing	Chevrolet
52	B. J. McLeod (i)	Rick Ware Racing	Ford
66	Timmy Hill (i)	MBM Motorsports	Toyota
72	Corey LaJoie	TriStar Motorsports	Chevrolet
78	Martin Truex Jr.	Furniture Row Racing	Toyota
88	Alex Bowman	Hendrick Motorsports	Chevrolet
95	Regan Smith (Note: Regan Smith replaced Kasey Kahne in the No. 95 Leavine Family Racing Chevrolet after the latter stood down due to an ongoing hydration issue that came to a head at the Southern 500 the weekend prior.)	Leavine Family Racing	Chevrolet
96	Jeffrey Earnhardt	Gaunt Brothers Racing	Toyota
(R) denotes driver is eligible for NASCAR Rookie of the Year (i) denotes driver is ineligible to score driver points due to competing for either the Xfinity or Truck Series championships (W) denotes past winner of event.
Official entry list

== Practice ==
Both practice sessions on Saturday were cancelled due to rain.

== Qualifying ==
Qualifying on Saturday was cancelled due to rain and Kyle Busch, the point leader, was awarded the pole as a result.

=== Starting lineup ===
Pos	No.	Driver	Team	Manufacturer
1	18	Kyle Busch	Joe Gibbs Racing	Toyota
2	4	Kevin Harvick	Stewart–Haas Racing	Ford
3	78	Martin Truex Jr.	Furniture Row Racing	Toyota
4	41	Kurt Busch	Stewart–Haas Racing	Ford
5	22	Joey Logano	Team Penske	Ford
6	2	Brad Keselowski	Team Penske	Ford
7	42	Kyle Larson	Chip Ganassi Racing	Chevrolet
8	14	Clint Bowyer	Stewart–Haas Racing	Ford
9	12	Ryan Blaney	Team Penske	Ford
10	11	Denny Hamlin	Joe Gibbs Racing	Toyota
11	9	Chase Elliott	Hendrick Motorsports	Chevrolet
12	10	Aric Almirola	Stewart–Haas Racing	Ford
13	20	Erik Jones	Joe Gibbs Racing	Toyota
14	48	Jimmie Johnson	Hendrick Motorsports	Chevrolet
15	88	Alex Bowman	Hendrick Motorsports	Chevrolet
16	17	Ricky Stenhouse Jr.	Roush Fenway Racing	Ford
17	31	Ryan Newman	Richard Childress Racing	Chevrolet
18	3	Austin Dillon	Richard Childress Racing	Chevrolet
19	21	Paul Menard	Wood Brothers Racing	Ford
20	19	Daniel Suárez	Joe Gibbs Racing	Toyota
21	1	Jamie McMurray	Chip Ganassi Racing	Chevrolet
22	24	William Byron (R)	Hendrick Motorsports	Chevrolet
23	37	Chris Buescher	JTG Daugherty Racing	Chevrolet
24	47	A. J. Allmendinger	JTG Daugherty Racing	Chevrolet
25	38	David Ragan	Front Row Motorsports	Ford
26	34	Michael McDowell	Front Row Motorsports	Ford
27	95	Regan Smith	Leavine Family Racing	Chevrolet
28	43	Bubba Wallace (R)	Richard Petty Motorsports	Chevrolet
29	6	Matt Kenseth	Roush Fenway Racing	Ford
30	13	Ty Dillon	Germain Racing	Chevrolet
31	32	Matt DiBenedetto	Go Fas Racing	Ford
32	15	Ross Chastain (i)	Premium Motorsports	Chevrolet
33	72	Corey LaJoie	Tri-Star Motorsports	Chevrolet
34	00	Landon Cassill (i)	StarCom Racing	Chevrolet
35	23	J. J. Yeley (i)	BK Racing	Toyota
36	51	David Starr (i)	Rick Ware Racing	Chevrolet
37	96	Jeffrey Earnhardt	Gaunt Brothers Racing	Toyota
38	7	Reed Sorenson	Premium Motorsports	Chevrolet
39	66	Timmy Hill (i)	MBM Motorsports	Toyota
40	52	B. J. McLeod (i)	Rick Ware Racing	Ford
Official starting lineup

== Race ==
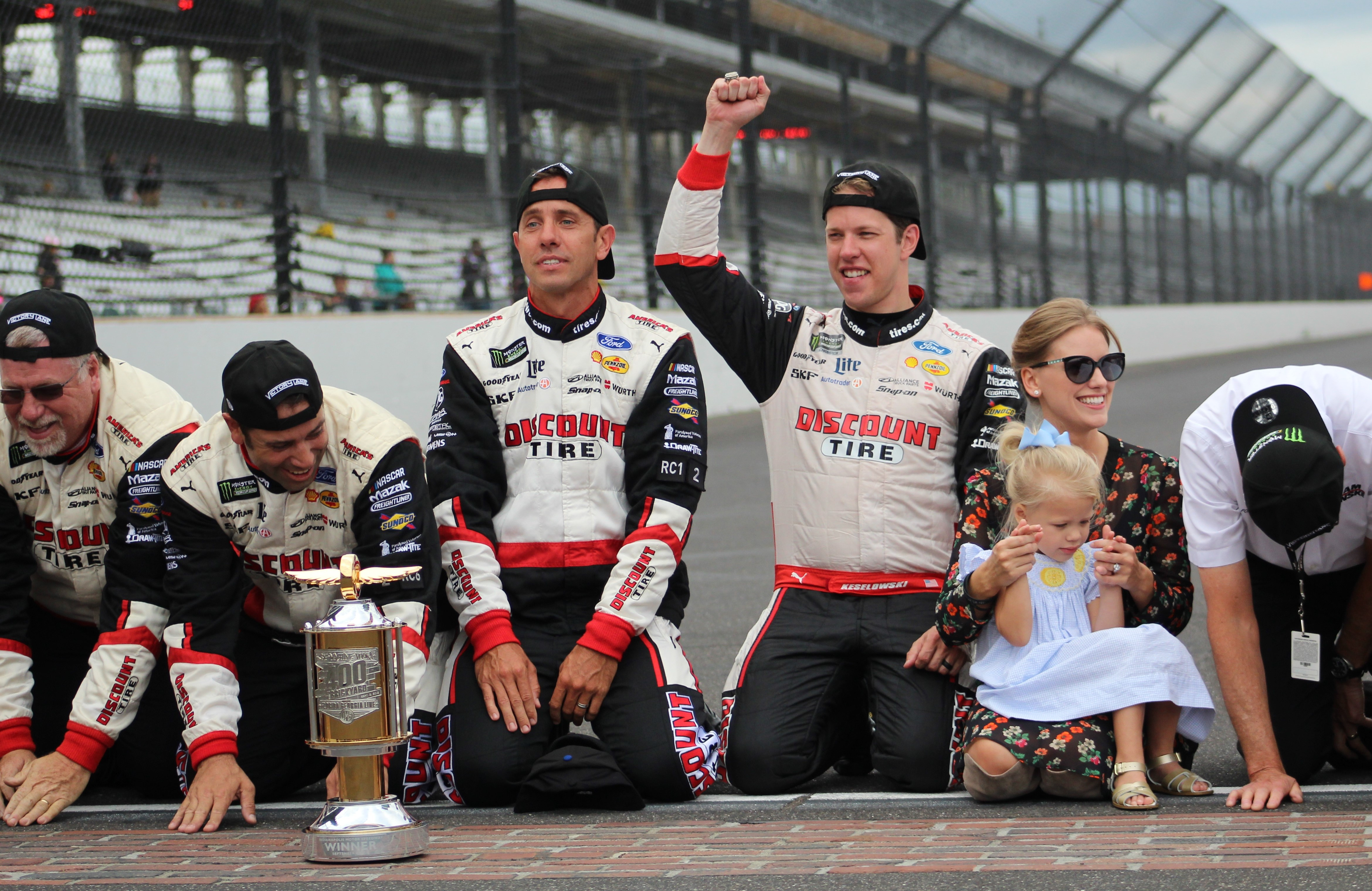
Brad Keselowski won the race.

=== Stage results ===
Stage 1 Laps: 50

Pos	No	Driver	Team	Manufacturer	Points
1	14	Clint Bowyer	Stewart–Haas Racing	Ford	10
2	41	Kurt Busch	Stewart–Haas Racing	Ford	9
3	11	Denny Hamlin	Joe Gibbs Racing	Toyota	8
4	42	Kyle Larson	Chip Ganassi Racing	Chevrolet	7
5	18	Kyle Busch	Joe Gibbs Racing	Toyota	6
6	2	Brad Keselowski	Team Penske	Ford	5
7	10	Aric Almirola	Stewart–Haas Racing	Ford	4
8	21	Paul Menard	Wood Brothers Racing	Ford	3
9	9	Chase Elliott	Hendrick Motorsports	Chevrolet	2
10	20	Erik Jones	Joe Gibbs Racing	Toyota	1
Official stage one results

Stage 2 Laps: 50

Pos	No	Driver	Team	Manufacturer	Points
1	6	Matt Kenseth	Roush Fenway Racing	Ford	10
2	9	Chase Elliott	Hendrick Motorsports	Chevrolet	9
3	20	Erik Jones	Joe Gibbs Racing	Toyota	8
4	22	Joey Logano	Team Penske	Ford	7
5	41	Kurt Busch	Stewart–Haas Racing	Ford	6
6	19	Daniel Suárez	Joe Gibbs Racing	Toyota	5
7	2	Brad Keselowski	Team Penske	Ford	4
8	24	William Byron	Hendrick Motorsports	Chevrolet	3
9	31	Ryan Newman	Richard Childress Racing	Chevrolet	2
10	48	Jimmie Johnson	Hendrick Motorsports	Chevrolet	1
Official stage two results

=== Final stage results ===
Stage 3 Laps: 60

Pos	Grid	No	Driver	Team	Manufacturer	Laps	Points
1	6	2	Brad Keselowski	Team Penske	Ford	160	49
2	13	20	Erik Jones	Joe Gibbs Racing	Toyota	160	44
3	10	11	Denny Hamlin	Joe Gibbs Racing	Toyota	160	42
4	2	4	Kevin Harvick	Stewart–Haas Racing	Ford	160	33
5	8	14	Clint Bowyer	Stewart–Haas Racing	Ford	160	42
6	4	41	Kurt Busch	Stewart–Haas Racing	Ford	160	46
7	21	1	Jamie McMurray	Chip Ganassi Racing	Chevrolet	160	30
8	1	18	Kyle Busch	Joe Gibbs Racing	Toyota	160	35
9	19	21	Paul Menard	Wood Brothers Racing	Ford	160	31
10	17	31	Ryan Newman	Richard Childress Racing	Chevrolet	160	29
11	9	12	Ryan Blaney	Team Penske	Ford	160	26
12	29	6	Matt Kenseth	Roush Fenway Racing	Ford	160	35
13	5	22	Joey Logano	Team Penske	Ford	160	31
14	7	42	Kyle Larson	Chip Ganassi Racing	Chevrolet	160	30
15	11	9	Chase Elliott	Hendrick Motorsports	Chevrolet	160	33
16	14	48	Jimmie Johnson	Hendrick Motorsports	Chevrolet	160	22
17	26	34	Michael McDowell	Front Row Motorsports	Ford	160	20
18	20	19	Daniel Suárez	Joe Gibbs Racing	Toyota	160	24
19	22	24	William Byron (R)	Hendrick Motorsports	Chevrolet	160	21
20	27	95	Regan Smith	Leavine Family Racing	Chevrolet	160	17
21	30	13	Ty Dillon	Germain Racing	Chevrolet	160	16
22	18	3	Austin Dillon	Richard Childress Racing	Chevrolet	160	15
23	12	10	Aric Almirola	Stewart–Haas Racing	Ford	159	18
24	25	38	David Ragan	Front Row Motorsports	Ford	159	13
25	23	37	Chris Buescher	JTG Daugherty Racing	Chevrolet	158	12
26	32	15	Ross Chastain (i)	Premium Motorsports	Chevrolet	158	0
27	33	72	Corey LaJoie	TriStar Motorsports	Chevrolet	158	10
28	38	7	Reed Sorenson	Premium Motorsports	Chevrolet	158	9
29	35	23	J. J. Yeley (i)	BK Racing	Toyota	157	0
30	40	52	B. J. McLeod (i)	Rick Ware Racing	Ford	157	0
31	34	00	Landon Cassill (i)	StarCom Racing	Chevrolet	150	0
32	37	96	Jeffrey Earnhardt	Gaunt Brothers Racing	Toyota	150	5
33	15	88	Alex Bowman	Hendrick Motorsports	Chevrolet	142	4
34	16	17	Ricky Stenhouse Jr.	Roush Fenway Racing	Ford	136	3
35	39	66	Timmy Hill (i)	MBM Motorsports	Toyota	124	0
36	31	32	Matt DiBenedetto	Go Fas Racing	Ford	89	1
37	24	47	A. J. Allmendinger	JTG Daugherty Racing	Chevrolet	66	1
38	28	43	Bubba Wallace (R)	Richard Petty Motorsports	Chevrolet	57	1
39	36	51	David Starr (i)	Rick Ware Racing	Chevrolet	57	0
40	3	78	Martin Truex Jr.	Furniture Row Racing	Toyota	41	1
Official race results

=== Race statistics ===
- Lead changes: 14 among 9 different drivers
- Cautions/Laps: 10 for 39 laps
- Red flags: 0
- Time of race: 3 hours, 6 minutes and 35 seconds
- Average speed: 128.629 miles per hour (207.008 km/h)

== Media ==
=== Television ===
NBC Sports covered the race on the television side, with a broadcast produced similarly to their Watkins Glen International race broadcasts. Rick Allen and Steve Letarte called the race from the broadcast booth, with individual turn announcers calling as the drivers passed them – Motor Racing Network broadcaster Mike Bagley in turn 2, Dale Earnhardt Jr. in turn 3, and Jeff Burton in turn 4. Dave Burns, Parker Kligerman, Marty Snider and Kelli Stavast reported from pit lane.

NBCSN
Booth announcers	Turn announcers	Pit reporters
Lap-by-lap: Rick Allen; Color commentator: Steve Letarte	Turn 2: Mike Bagley; Turn 3: Dale Earnhardt Jr. Turn 4: Jeff Burton	Dave Burns; Parker Kligerman; Marty Snider; Kelli Stavast

=== Radio ===
Indianapolis Motor Speedway Radio Network and the Performance Racing Network jointly co-produced the radio broadcast for the race, which was simulcast on Sirius XM NASCAR Radio, and aired on IMS or PRN stations, depending on contractual obligations. The lead announcers and two pit reporters were PRN staff, while the turns and two pit reporters were from IMS.

PRN/IMS Radio
Booth announcers	Turn announcers	Pit reporters
Lead announcer: Doug Rice; Announcer: Pat Patterson; Announcer: Jeff Hammond; Historian: Donald Davidson	Turn 1: Mark Jaynes; Turn 2: Nick Yeoman; Turn 3: Jake Query; Turn 4: Chris Denari	Brad Gillie; Brett McMillan; Ryan Myrehn; Michael Young

== Standings after the race ==
Drivers' Championship standings after Playoffs reset

	Pos	Driver	Points
	1	Kyle Busch	2,050
	2	Kevin Harvick	2,050 (−0)
	3	Martin Truex Jr.	2,035 (−15)
2	4	Brad Keselowski	2,019 (−31)
3	5	Clint Bowyer	2,015 (−35)
1	6	Joey Logano	2,014 (−36)
3	7	Kurt Busch	2,014 (−36)
3	8	Chase Elliott	2,008 (−42)
	9	Ryan Blaney	2,007 (−43)
3	10	Erik Jones	2,005 (−45)
7	11	Austin Dillon	2,005 (−45)
5	12	Kyle Larson	2,005 (−45)
3	13	Denny Hamlin	2,003 (−47)
2	14	Aric Almirola	2,001 (−49)
1	15	Jimmie Johnson	2,000 (−50)
1	16	Alex Bowman	2,000 (−50)
Official driver's standings

Manufacturers' Championship standings

Pos	Manufacturer	Points
1	Toyota	941
2	Ford	935 (−6)
3	Chevrolet	847 (−94)
Official manufacturers' standings

- Note: Only the first 16 positions are included for the driver standings.

== Notes ==
Previous race: 2018 Bojangles' Southern 500	Monster Energy NASCAR Cup Series; 2018 season	Next race: 2018 South Point 400
