= 2018 South Point 400 =

Race details
- Race 27 of 36 in the 2018 Monster Energy NASCAR Cup Series
- The 2018 South Point 400 program cover. "It All Starts Here!"
- Date: September 16, 2018
- Location: Las Vegas Motor Speedway in Las Vegas
- Course: Permanent racing facility
- Course length: 1.5 miles (2.414 km)
- Distance: 272 laps, 408 mi (656.612 km)
- Scheduled distance: 267 laps, 400.5 mi (644.542 km)
- Average speed: 111.849 miles per hour (180.004 km/h)

Pole position
| Driver | Erik Jones | Joe Gibbs Racing |
- Time: 28.705

Most laps led
| Driver | Martin Truex Jr. | Furniture Row Racing |
- Laps: 96

Winner
| No. 2 | Brad Keselowski | Team Penske |

Television in the United States
- Network: NBC
- Announcers: Rick Allen, Jeff Burton, Steve Letarte and Dale Earnhardt Jr.
- Nielsen ratings: 1.3 (Overnight)

Radio in the United States
- Radio: PRN
- Booth announcers: Doug Rice, Mark Garrow and Wendy Venturini
- Turn announcers: Rob Albright (1 & 2) and Pat Patterson (3 & 4)

The 2018 South Point 400 was a Monster Energy NASCAR Cup Series race held on September 16, 2018 at Las Vegas Motor Speedway in Las Vegas. Contested over 272 laps – extended from 267 laps due to an overtime finish – on the 1.5-mile (2.4-kilometre) asphalt intermediate speedway, it was the 27th race of the 2018 Monster Energy NASCAR Cup Series season, and the opening race of the Playoffs (and its initial Round of 16).

Team Penske driver Brad Keselowski won his 3rd consecutive race to advance to the Round of 12, taking the lead from Kyle Larson (Hendrick Motorsports) on lap 251, recording Team Penske's 500th victory across their auto racing endeavors.

== Report ==
=== Background ===
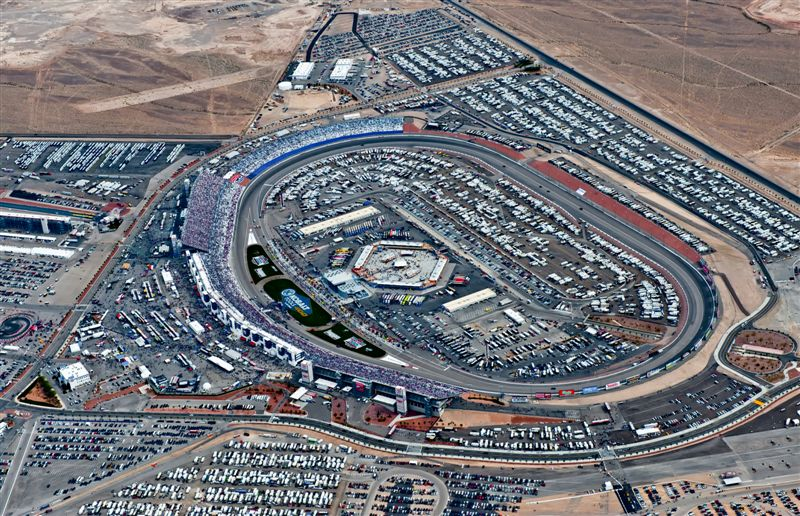
Las Vegas Motor Speedway, the track where the race is held.

Las Vegas Motor Speedway, located in Clark County, Nevada outside the Las Vegas city limits and about 15 miles (24 kilometres) northeast of the Las Vegas Strip, is a 1,200-acre (490-hectare) complex of multiple tracks for motorsports racing. The complex is owned by Speedway Motorsports, Inc., which is headquartered in Charlotte, North Carolina.

==== Entry list ====
| No. | Driver | Team | Manufacturer |
|---|---|---|---|
| 00 | Landon Cassill (i) | StarCom Racing | Chevrolet |
| 1 | Jamie McMurray | Chip Ganassi Racing | Chevrolet |
| 2 | Brad Keselowski | Team Penske | Ford |
| 3 | Austin Dillon | Richard Childress Racing | Chevrolet |
| 4 | Kevin Harvick | Stewart–Haas Racing | Ford |
| 6 | Trevor Bayne | Roush Fenway Racing | Ford |
| 7 | Reed Sorenson | Premium Motorsports | Chevrolet |
| 9 | Chase Elliott | Hendrick Motorsports | Chevrolet |
| 10 | Aric Almirola | Stewart–Haas Racing | Ford |
| 11 | Denny Hamlin | Joe Gibbs Racing | Toyota |
| 12 | Ryan Blaney | Team Penske | Ford |
| 13 | Ty Dillon | Germain Racing | Chevrolet |
| 14 | Clint Bowyer | Stewart–Haas Racing | Ford |
| 15 | Ross Chastain (i) | Premium Motorsports | Chevrolet |
| 17 | Ricky Stenhouse Jr. | Roush Fenway Racing | Ford |
| 18 | Kyle Busch | Joe Gibbs Racing | Toyota |
| 19 | Daniel Suárez | Joe Gibbs Racing | Toyota |
| 20 | Erik Jones | Joe Gibbs Racing | Toyota |
| 21 | Paul Menard | Wood Brothers Racing | Ford |
| 22 | Joey Logano | Team Penske | Ford |
| 23 | J. J. Yeley (i) | BK Racing | Toyota |
| 24 | William Byron (R) | Hendrick Motorsports | Chevrolet |
| 31 | Ryan Newman | Richard Childress Racing | Chevrolet |
| 32 | Matt DiBenedetto | Go Fas Racing | Ford |
| 34 | Michael McDowell | Front Row Motorsports | Ford |
| 37 | Chris Buescher | JTG Daugherty Racing | Chevrolet |
| 38 | David Ragan | Front Row Motorsports | Ford |
| 41 | Kurt Busch | Stewart–Haas Racing | Ford |
| 42 | Kyle Larson | Chip Ganassi Racing | Chevrolet |
| 43 | Bubba Wallace (R) | Richard Petty Motorsports | Chevrolet |
| 47 | A. J. Allmendinger | JTG Daugherty Racing | Chevrolet |
| 48 | Jimmie Johnson | Hendrick Motorsports | Chevrolet |
| 51 | B. J. McLeod (i) | Rick Ware Racing | Ford |
| 66 | Timmy Hill (i) | MBM Motorsports | Toyota |
| 72 | Corey LaJoie | TriStar Motorsports | Chevrolet |
| 78 | Martin Truex Jr. | Furniture Row Racing | Toyota |
| 88 | Alex Bowman | Hendrick Motorsports | Chevrolet |
| 95 | Regan Smith | Leavine Family Racing | Chevrolet |
| 96 | Jeffrey Earnhardt | Gaunt Brothers Racing | Toyota |
| 99 | Kyle Weatherman | StarCom Racing | Chevrolet |
Official entry list

== First practice ==
Joey Logano was the fastest in the first practice session with a time of 28.473 seconds and a speed of 189.653 mph (305.217 km/h).

| Pos | No. | Driver | Team | Manufacturer | Time | Speed |
|---|---|---|---|---|---|---|
| 1 | 22 | Joey Logano | Team Penske | Ford | 28.473 | 189.653 |
| 2 | 4 | Kevin Harvick | Stewart–Haas Racing | Ford | 28.502 | 189.460 |
| 3 | 10 | Aric Almirola | Stewart–Haas Racing | Ford | 28.592 | 188.864 |
Official first practice results

== Qualifying ==
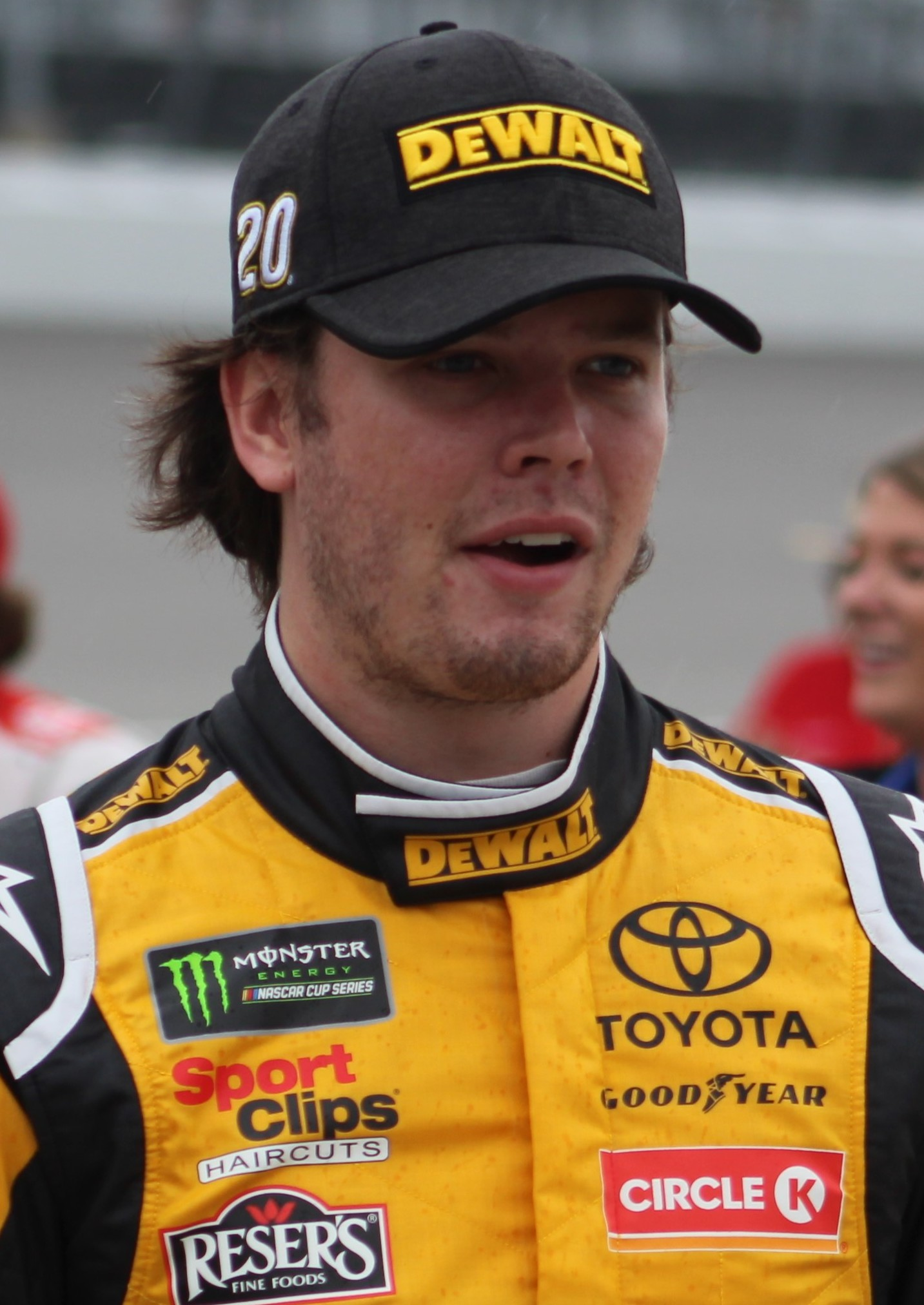
Erik Jones scored the pole position.

Erik Jones scored the pole for the race with a time of 28.705 and a speed of 188.121 mph (302.751 km/h).

=== Qualifying results ===
| Pos | No. | Driver | Team | Manufacturer | R1 | R2 | R3 |
|---|---|---|---|---|---|---|---|
| 1 | 20 | Erik Jones | Joe Gibbs Racing | Toyota | 28.766 | 28.737 | 28.705 |
| 2 | 22 | Joey Logano | Team Penske | Ford | 28.617 | 28.751 | 28.708 |
| 3 | 11 | Denny Hamlin | Joe Gibbs Racing | Toyota | 28.907 | 28.775 | 28.781 |
| 4 | 18 | Kyle Busch | Joe Gibbs Racing | Toyota | 29.155 | 28.892 | 28.815 |
| 5 | 4 | Kevin Harvick | Stewart–Haas Racing | Ford | 28.605 | 28.749 | 28.816 |
| 6 | 12 | Ryan Blaney | Team Penske | Ford | 28.752 | 28.904 | 28.864 |
| 7 | 9 | Chase Elliott | Hendrick Motorsports | Chevrolet | 29.098 | 28.865 | 28.918 |
| 8 | 41 | Kurt Busch | Stewart–Haas Racing | Ford | 28.831 | 28.935 | 28.957 |
| 9 | 88 | Alex Bowman | Hendrick Motorsports | Chevrolet | 28.684 | 28.915 | 28.974 |
| 10 | 78 | Martin Truex Jr. | Furniture Row Racing | Toyota | 29.072 | 28.891 | 29.017 |
| 11 | 42 | Kyle Larson | Chip Ganassi Racing | Chevrolet | 28.725 | 28.846 | 29.040 |
| 12 | 1 | Jamie McMurray | Chip Ganassi Racing | Chevrolet | 29.025 | 28.931 | 29.488 |
| 13 | 2 | Brad Keselowski | Team Penske | Ford | 28.802 | 28.936 | — |
| 14 | 17 | Ricky Stenhouse Jr. | Roush Fenway Racing | Ford | 29.034 | 28.939 | — |
| 15 | 14 | Clint Bowyer | Stewart–Haas Racing | Ford | 28.729 | 28.942 | — |
| 16 | 10 | Aric Almirola | Stewart–Haas Racing | Ford | 28.735 | 28.947 | — |
| 17 | 48 | Jimmie Johnson | Hendrick Motorsports | Chevrolet | 28.784 | 28.953 | — |
| 18 | 3 | Austin Dillon | Richard Childress Racing | Chevrolet | 28.824 | 28.957 | — |
| 19 | 19 | Daniel Suárez | Joe Gibbs Racing | Toyota | 28.995 | 28.962 | — |
| 20 | 21 | Paul Menard | Wood Brothers Racing | Ford | 28.866 | 28.965 | — |
| 21 | 24 | William Byron (R) | Hendrick Motorsports | Chevrolet | 28.830 | 28.970 | — |
| 22 | 31 | Ryan Newman | Richard Childress Racing | Chevrolet | 28.889 | 29.054 | — |
| 23 | 6 | Trevor Bayne | Roush Fenway Racing | Ford | 28.933 | 29.088 | — |
| 24 | 34 | Michael McDowell | Front Row Motorsports | Ford | 29.120 | 29.203 | — |
| 25 | 95 | Regan Smith | Leavine Family Racing | Chevrolet | 29.160 | — | — |
| 26 | 32 | Matt DiBenedetto | Go Fas Racing | Ford | 29.199 | — | — |
| 27 | 38 | David Ragan | Front Row Motorsports | Ford | 29.233 | — | — |
| 28 | 37 | Chris Buescher | JTG Daugherty Racing | Chevrolet | 29.243 | — | — |
| 29 | 47 | A. J. Allmendinger | JTG Daugherty Racing | Chevrolet | 29.252 | — | — |
| 30 | 13 | Ty Dillon | Germain Racing | Chevrolet | 29.311 | — | — |
| 31 | 43 | Bubba Wallace (R) | Richard Petty Motorsports | Chevrolet | 29.538 | — | — |
| 32 | 72 | Corey LaJoie | TriStar Motorsports | Chevrolet | 29.890 | — | — |
| 33 | 99 | Kyle Weatherman | StarCom Racing | Chevrolet | 29.903 | — | — |
| 34 | 15 | Ross Chastain (i) | Premium Motorsports | Chevrolet | 29.944 | — | — |
| 35 | 96 | Jeffrey Earnhardt | Gaunt Brothers Racing | Toyota | 30.004 | — | — |
| 36 | 23 | J. J. Yeley (i) | BK Racing | Toyota | 30.095 | — | — |
| 37 | 00 | Landon Cassill (i) | StarCom Racing | Chevrolet | 30.289 | — | — |
| 38 | 51 | B. J. McLeod (i) | Rick Ware Racing | Ford | 30.416 | — | — |
| 39 | 66 | Timmy Hill (i) | MBM Motorsports | Toyota | 30.667 | — | — |
| 40 | 7 | Reed Sorenson | Premium Motorsports | Chevrolet | 0.000 | — | — |
Official qualifying results

== Practice (post-qualifying) ==
=== Second practice ===
Ryan Newman was the fastest in the second practice session with a time of 29.365 seconds and a speed of 183.892 mph (295.945 km/h).

| Pos | No. | Driver | Team | Manufacturer | Time | Speed |
|---|---|---|---|---|---|---|
| 1 | 31 | Ryan Newman | Richard Childress Racing | Chevrolet | 29.365 | 183.892 |
| 2 | 12 | Ryan Blaney | Team Penske | Ford | 29.465 | 183.268 |
| 3 | 10 | Aric Almirola | Stewart–Haas Racing | Ford | 29.477 | 183.194 |
Official second practice results

=== Final practice ===
Erik Jones was the fastest in the final practice session with a time of 29.793 seconds and a speed of 181.251 mph (291.695 km/h).

| Pos | No. | Driver | Team | Manufacturer | Time | Speed |
|---|---|---|---|---|---|---|
| 1 | 20 | Erik Jones | Joe Gibbs Racing | Toyota | 29.793 | 181.251 |
| 2 | 12 | Ryan Blaney | Team Penske | Ford | 29.795 | 181.238 |
| 3 | 88 | Alex Bowman | Hendrick Motorsports | Chevrolet | 29.801 | 181.202 |
Official final practice results

== Race ==
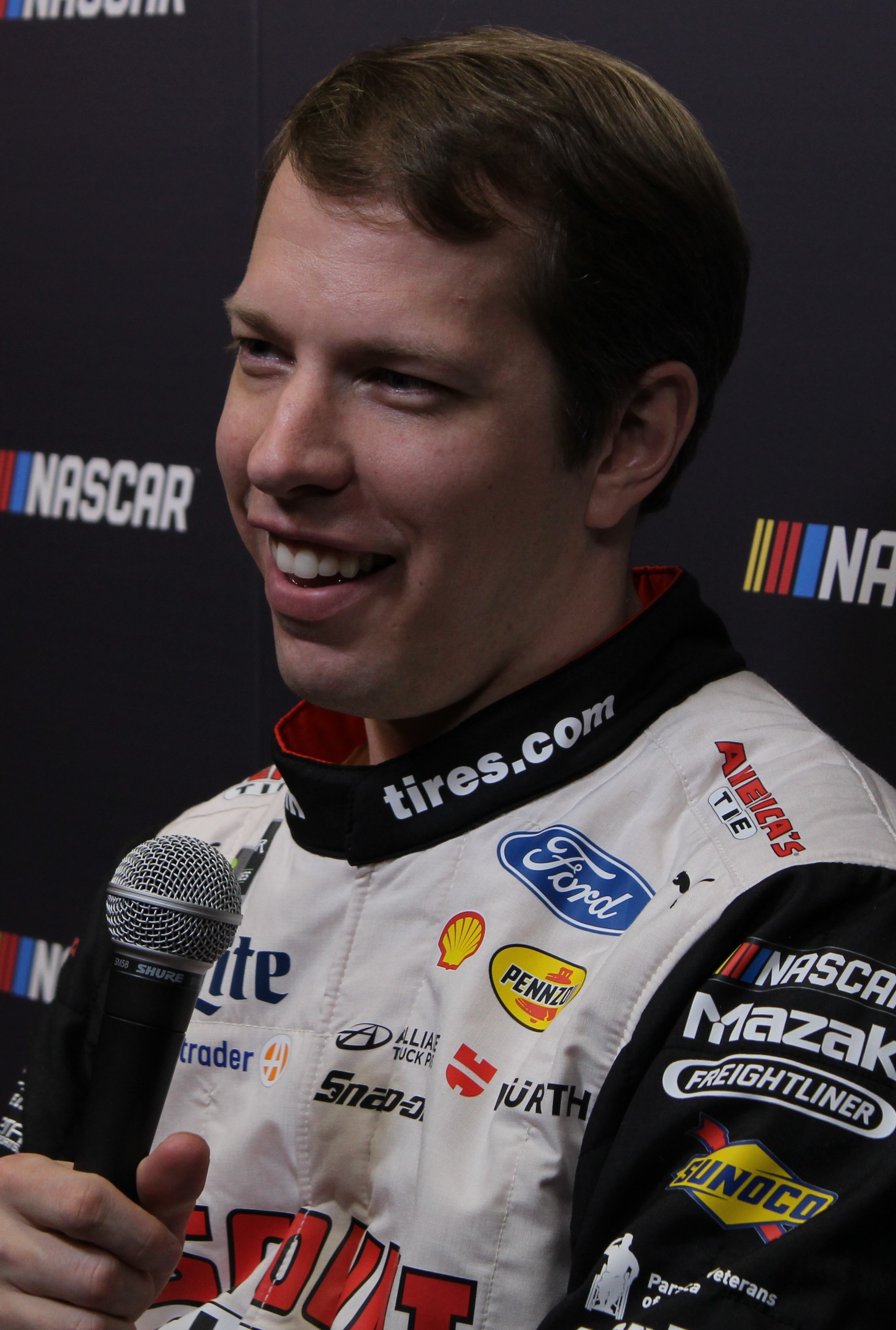
Brad Keselowski won the race.

Having started from pole position, Erik Jones ceded the lead on the opening lap to Joey Logano, who led the race up until the opening set of pit stops, which were conducted under green flag conditions. Kevin Harvick took the lead following the end of the pit stop cycle, but was surpassed by Martin Truex Jr. on lap 59, who ultimately went on to win the first stage ahead of Harvick and Alex Bowman. Following a restart at the end of lap 87, the first non-stage yellow flag was thrown on lap 90, when Ricky Stenhouse Jr. hit the wall in turn 3 which resulted in debris on track. Truex Jr. maintained the lead until the next caution period, at lap 112, when Ty Dillon suffered a tire failure on the frontstretch. Brad Keselowski moved ahead of Truex Jr. during the pit stop cycle, leading to the restart on lap 116, before Truex Jr. re-assumed the lead on lap 125. The race's fourth caution period occurred on lap 148, when Harvick's car suffered a right front blowout and went into the wall, with Jones collecting Harvick; both drivers retired from the race as a result. Keselowski retook the lead during the pit stop cycle, and ultimately won the second stage ahead of Kurt Busch and Truex Jr. after a five-lap run to the end of the stage.

Jamie McMurray led the field at the start of the final stage, having not pitted, but was overtaken by Kyle Larson upon the restart. Larson and Keselowski traded the lead over the next portion of the race, which included a caution period at lap 184 for rookie William Byron, who hit the wall in turn 3 after suffering a flat tire. Truex Jr. regained the lead on lap 202 before the next yellow flag period on lap 212, when McMurray's car spun following a failed tire, and in the process, collected the car of Chase Elliott, with both drivers forced out of the race. After Keselowski took the lead during the pit stops, Logano led at the restart on lap 222, holding the lead to the next caution period on lap 234, when Kyle Busch's car got loose coming out of turn 4 and spun down to the frontstretch grass. Keselowski jumped Logano and Truex Jr. during the pit stops before Larson cleared them all on the restart at the start of lap 238 to take the lead, before Denny Hamlin caused the next caution on lap 247, with a similar crash to Kyle Busch and forcing his retirement from the race. Keselowski gained the lead from Larson upon the restart, before another caution on lap 253, when Stenhouse Jr. got loose on the exit of turn 2 and A. J. Allmendinger made contact which saw Stenhouse Jr. hit the wall on the inside of the backstretch. Following further tire problems for Bowman and Jimmie Johnson on the next restart, the yellow flag was flown with six laps to go. Following the restart at the start of lap 266, and as the leaders were rounding turn 4 at the end of the lap, contact between Front Row Motorsports teammates David Ragan and Michael McDowell resulted in them both hitting the wall, and also collecting Ross Chastain, Matt DiBenedetto and Kurt Busch. After a red flag period of 10 minutes, racing ultimately resumed for a green–white–checkered finish, with Keselowski ultimately prevailing for his 3rd consecutive victory and Team Penske's 500th overall.

=== Stage results ===
Stage 1 Laps: 80

| Pos | No | Driver | Team | Manufacturer | Points |
|---|---|---|---|---|---|
| 1 | 78 | Martin Truex Jr. | Furniture Row Racing | Toyota | 10 |
| 2 | 4 | Kevin Harvick | Stewart–Haas Racing | Ford | 9 |
| 3 | 88 | Alex Bowman | Hendrick Motorsports | Chevrolet | 8 |
| 4 | 41 | Kurt Busch | Stewart–Haas Racing | Ford | 7 |
| 5 | 18 | Kyle Busch | Joe Gibbs Racing | Toyota | 6 |
| 6 | 9 | Chase Elliott | Hendrick Motorsports | Chevrolet | 5 |
| 7 | 22 | Joey Logano | Team Penske | Ford | 4 |
| 8 | 20 | Erik Jones | Joe Gibbs Racing | Toyota | 3 |
| 9 | 10 | Aric Almirola | Stewart–Haas Racing | Ford | 2 |
| 10 | 31 | Ryan Newman | Richard Childress Racing | Chevrolet | 1 |
Official stage one results

Stage 2 Laps: 80

| Pos | No | Driver | Team | Manufacturer | Points |
|---|---|---|---|---|---|
| 1 | 2 | Brad Keselowski | Team Penske | Ford | 10 |
| 2 | 41 | Kurt Busch | Stewart–Haas Racing | Ford | 9 |
| 3 | 78 | Martin Truex Jr. | Furniture Row Racing | Toyota | 8 |
| 4 | 48 | Jimmie Johnson | Hendrick Motorsports | Chevrolet | 7 |
| 5 | 1 | Jamie McMurray | Chip Ganassi Racing | Chevrolet | 6 |
| 6 | 22 | Joey Logano | Team Penske | Ford | 5 |
| 7 | 9 | Chase Elliott | Hendrick Motorsports | Chevrolet | 4 |
| 8 | 12 | Ryan Blaney | Team Penske | Ford | 3 |
| 9 | 88 | Alex Bowman | Hendrick Motorsports | Chevrolet | 2 |
| 10 | 42 | Kyle Larson | Chip Ganassi Racing | Chevrolet | 1 |
Official stage two results

=== Final stage results ===
Stage 3 Laps: 107

| Pos | Grid | No | Driver | Team | Manufacturer | Laps | Points |
|---|---|---|---|---|---|---|---|
| 1 | 13 | 2 | Brad Keselowski | Team Penske | Ford | 272 | 50 |
| 2 | 11 | 42 | Kyle Larson | Chip Ganassi Racing | Chevrolet | 272 | 36 |
| 3 | 10 | 78 | Martin Truex Jr. | Furniture Row Racing | Toyota | 272 | 52 |
| 4 | 2 | 22 | Joey Logano | Team Penske | Ford | 272 | 42 |
| 5 | 6 | 12 | Ryan Blaney | Team Penske | Ford | 272 | 35 |
| 6 | 16 | 10 | Aric Almirola | Stewart–Haas Racing | Ford | 272 | 33 |
| 7 | 4 | 18 | Kyle Busch | Joe Gibbs Racing | Toyota | 272 | 35 |
| 8 | 19 | 19 | Daniel Suárez | Joe Gibbs Racing | Toyota | 272 | 29 |
| 9 | 22 | 31 | Ryan Newman | Richard Childress Racing | Chevrolet | 272 | 29 |
| 10 | 20 | 21 | Paul Menard | Wood Brothers Racing | Ford | 272 | 27 |
| 11 | 18 | 3 | Austin Dillon | Richard Childress Racing | Chevrolet | 272 | 26 |
| 12 | 25 | 95 | Regan Smith | Leavine Family Racing | Chevrolet | 272 | 25 |
| 13 | 23 | 6 | Trevor Bayne | Roush Fenway Racing | Ford | 272 | 24 |
| 14 | 29 | 47 | A. J. Allmendinger | JTG Daugherty Racing | Chevrolet | 272 | 23 |
| 15 | 28 | 37 | Chris Buescher | JTG Daugherty Racing | Chevrolet | 272 | 22 |
| 16 | 32 | 72 | Corey LaJoie | TriStar Motorsports | Chevrolet | 272 | 21 |
| 17 | 36 | 23 | J. J. Yeley (i) | BK Racing | Toyota | 272 | 0 |
| 18 | 37 | 00 | Landon Cassill (i) | StarCom Racing | Chevrolet | 272 | 0 |
| 19 | 9 | 88 | Alex Bowman | Hendrick Motorsports | Chevrolet | 271 | 28 |
| 20 | 34 | 15 | Ross Chastain (i) | Premium Motorsports | Chevrolet | 271 | 0 |
| 21 | 8 | 41 | Kurt Busch | Stewart–Haas Racing | Ford | 271 | 32 |
| 22 | 17 | 48 | Jimmie Johnson | Hendrick Motorsports | Chevrolet | 270 | 22 |
| 23 | 15 | 14 | Clint Bowyer | Stewart–Haas Racing | Ford | 270 | 14 |
| 24 | 26 | 32 | Matt DiBenedetto | Go Fas Racing | Ford | 269 | 13 |
| 25 | 35 | 96 | Jeffrey Earnhardt | Gaunt Brothers Racing | Toyota | 269 | 12 |
| 26 | 33 | 99 | Kyle Weatherman | StarCom Racing | Chevrolet | 269 | 11 |
| 27 | 27 | 38 | David Ragan | Front Row Motorsports | Ford | 268 | 10 |
| 28 | 38 | 51 | B. J. McLeod (i) | Rick Ware Racing | Ford | 268 | 0 |
| 29 | 24 | 34 | Michael McDowell | Front Row Motorsports | Ford | 265 | 8 |
| 30 | 14 | 17 | Ricky Stenhouse Jr. | Roush Fenway Racing | Ford | 251 | 7 |
| 31 | 40 | 7 | Reed Sorenson | Premium Motorsports | Chevrolet | 246 | 6 |
| 32 | 3 | 11 | Denny Hamlin | Joe Gibbs Racing | Toyota | 245 | 5 |
| 33 | 39 | 66 | Timmy Hill (i) | MBM Motorsports | Toyota | 231 | 0 |
| 34 | 30 | 13 | Ty Dillon | Germain Racing | Chevrolet | 218 | 3 |
| 35 | 12 | 1 | Jamie McMurray | Chip Ganassi Racing | Chevrolet | 211 | 8 |
| 36 | 7 | 9 | Chase Elliott | Hendrick Motorsports | Chevrolet | 211 | 11 |
| 37 | 21 | 24 | William Byron (R) | Hendrick Motorsports | Chevrolet | 210 | 1 |
| 38 | 31 | 43 | Bubba Wallace (R) | Richard Petty Motorsports | Chevrolet | 164 | 1 |
| 39 | 5 | 4 | Kevin Harvick | Stewart–Haas Racing | Ford | 147 | 10 |
| 40 | 1 | 20 | Erik Jones | Joe Gibbs Racing | Toyota | 147 | 4 |
Official race results

=== Race statistics ===
- Lead changes: 23 among 9 different drivers
- Cautions/Laps: 12 for 59 laps
- Red flags: 1 for 10 minutes and 37 seconds
- Time of race: 3 hours, 28 minutes and 15 seconds
- Average speed: 111.849 miles per hour (180.004 km/h)

== Media ==
=== Television ===
NBC Sports called the race on the television side. Rick Allen, Jeff Burton, Steve Letarte and Dale Earnhardt Jr. called the race from the broadcast booth, while Dave Burns, Parker Kligerman, Marty Snider and Kelli Stavast reported from pit lane.

NBC
| Booth announcers | Pit reporters |
|---|---|
| Lap-by-lap: Rick Allen; Color commentator: Jeff Burton; Color commentator: Steve Letarte; Color commentator: Dale Earnhardt Jr. | Dave Burns; Parker Kligerman; Marty Snider; Kelli Stavast |

=== Radio ===
PRN covered the radio call for the race which was also simulcast on SiriusXM's NASCAR Radio channel. Doug Rice, Mark Garrow and Wendy Venturini called the race in the booth when the field raced through the tri-oval. Rob Albright called the race from a billboard in turn 2 when the field raced through turns 1 and 2. Pat Patterson called the race from a billboard outside of turn 3 when the field raced through turns 3 and 4. Brad Gillie, Brett McMillan, Jim Noble and Heather DeBeaux worked pit road for the radio side.

PRN
| Booth announcers | Turn announcers | Pit reporters |
|---|---|---|
| Lead announcer: Doug Rice; Announcer: Mark Garrow; Announcer: Wendy Venturini | Turns 1 & 2: Rob Albright; Turns 3 & 4: Pat Patterson | Brad Gillie; Brett McMillan; Jim Noble; Heather DeBeaux |

== Standings after the race ==
| | Pos | Driver | Points |
|---|---|---|---|
| 2 | 1 | Martin Truex Jr. | 2,087 |
| 1 | 2 | Kyle Busch | 2,085 (–2) |
| 1 | 3 | Brad Keselowski | 2,069 (–18) |
| 2 | 4 | Kevin Harvick | 2,060 (–27) |
| 1 | 5 | Joey Logano | 2,056 (–31) |
| 1 | 6 | Kurt Busch | 2,046 (–41) |
| 2 | 7 | Ryan Blaney | 2,042 (–45) |
| 4 | 8 | Kyle Larson | 2,041 (–46) |
| 5 | 9 | Aric Almirola | 2,034 (–53) |
| 1 | 10 | Austin Dillon | 2,031 (–56) |
| 6 | 11 | Clint Bowyer | 2,029 (–58) |
| 4 | 12 | Alex Bowman | 2,028 (–59) |
| 2 | 13 | Jimmie Johnson | 2,022 (–65) |
| 6 | 14 | Chase Elliott | 2,019 (–68) |
| 5 | 15 | Erik Jones | 2,009 (–78) |
| 3 | 16 | Denny Hamlin | 2,008 (–79) |
Official driver's standings

Manufacturers' Championship standings

| | Pos | Manufacturer | Points |
|---|---|---|---|
| 1 | 1 | Ford | 975 |
| 1 | 2 | Toyota | 975 (–0) |
| | 3 | Chevrolet | 882 (–93) |
Official manufacturers' standings

- Note: Only the first 16 positions are included for the driver standings.

| Previous race: 2018 Brickyard 400 | Monster Energy NASCAR Cup Series; 2018 season | Next race: 2018 Federated Auto Parts 400 |
