= 2018 Bojangles' Southern 500 =

Race details
- Race 25 of 36 in the 2018 Monster Energy NASCAR Cup Series
- The 2018 Bojangles' Southern 500 program cover.
- Date: September 2, 2018
- Location: Darlington Raceway in Darlington, South Carolina
- Course: Permanent racing facility
- Course length: 1.366 miles (2.198 km)
- Distance: 367 laps, 501.322 mi (806.666 km)
- Average speed: 131.408 miles per hour (211.481 km/h)

Pole position
Driver	Denny Hamlin	Joe Gibbs Racing
- Time: 28.332

Most laps led
Driver	Kyle Larson	Chip Ganassi Racing
- Laps: 284

Winner
No. 2	Brad Keselowski	Team Penske

Television in the United States
- Network: NBC
- Announcers: Steve Letarte, Jeff Burton and Dale Earnhardt Jr. (booth); Rick Allen, Dale Jarrett and Kyle Petty (NBC Peacock Pitbox)
- Nielsen ratings: 1.5 (Overnight)

Radio in the United States
- Radio: MRN
- Booth announcers: Joe Moore, Jeff Striegle and Rusty Wallace
- Turn announcers: Dave Moody (1 & 2) and Mike Bagley (3 & 4)

The 2018 Bojangles' Southern 500, the 69th running of the event was a Monster Energy NASCAR Cup Series race held on September 2, 2018, at Darlington Raceway in Darlington, South Carolina. Contested over 367 laps on the 1.366-mile (2.198 km) egg-shaped oval, it was the 25th race of the 2018 Monster Energy NASCAR Cup Series season. This race marked the final career start for Kasey Kahne.

== Report ==
=== Background ===
Layout of Darlington Raceway, the track where the race is held.

Darlington Raceway is a race track built for NASCAR racing located near Darlington, South Carolina. It is nicknamed "The Lady in Black" and "The Track Too Tough to Tame" by many NASCAR fans and drivers and advertised as "A NASCAR Tradition." It is of a unique, somewhat egg-shaped design, an oval with the ends of very different configurations, a condition which supposedly arose from the proximity of one end of the track to a minnow pond the owner refused to relocate. This situation makes it very challenging for the crews to set up their cars' handling in a way that is effective at both ends.

==== Entry list ====
No.	Driver	Team	Manufacturer	Sponsor or Throwback
00	Landon Cassill (i)	StarCom Racing	Chevrolet	StarCom Fiber – Bobby Allison's 1988 Daytona 500 winning car
1	Jamie McMurray	Chip Ganassi Racing	Chevrolet	McDonald's – Bill Elliott's 1998 car, scheme dedicated to the 50th anniversary of McDonald's Big Mac
2	Brad Keselowski	Team Penske	Ford	Miller Genuine Draft – Rusty Wallace's 1990 car
3	Austin Dillon	Richard Childress Racing	Chevrolet	American Ethanol E15 – Dale Earnhardt's 1995 Silver Monster Energy NASCAR All-Star Race car
4	Kevin Harvick	Stewart–Haas Racing	Ford	1996 Busch Beer design
6	Matt Kenseth	Roush Fenway Racing	Ford	Oscar Mayer
9	Chase Elliott	Hendrick Motorsports	Chevrolet	NAPA Auto Parts – Cousin Casey Elliott's 1993 All Pro Series-inspired car.
10	Aric Almirola	Stewart–Haas Racing	Ford	Smithfield Foods Helping Hungry Homes
11	Denny Hamlin	Joe Gibbs Racing	Toyota	FedEx – Hamlin's first-ever car that he ran in mini stock in 1997 at Langley Speedway and Southside Speedway in Virginia.
12	Ryan Blaney	Team Penske	Ford	Duracell – Father Dave Blaney's 2003 car
13	Ty Dillon	Germain Racing	Chevrolet	GEICO – 2009–2011 team car
14	Clint Bowyer	Stewart–Haas Racing	Ford	Ned Jarrett's 1965 Southern 500 winning car
15	Ross Chastain (i)	Premium Motorsports	Chevrolet	None
17	Ricky Stenhouse Jr.	Roush Fenway Racing	Ford	John Deere – Chad Little's 1997–2000 car
18	Kyle Busch	Joe Gibbs Racing	Toyota	Skittles – Derrike Cope & Ernie Irvan's 1997–1998 car
19	Daniel Suárez	Joe Gibbs Racing	Toyota	Arris
20	Erik Jones	Joe Gibbs Racing	Toyota	Sport Clips – Rick Carelli Camping World Truck Series inspired car
21	Paul Menard	Wood Brothers Racing	Ford	Ford Motorcraft/Quick Lane Tire & Auto Center – Cale Yarborough's 1968 Southern 500 winning car
22	Joey Logano	Team Penske	Ford	Pennzoil – Steve Park's 1998 – 2002 car
23	Joey Gase (i)	BK Racing	Toyota	Sparks Energy – Scheme duplicates his father Bob Gase, had when he won the 2003 championship in his modified at Hawkeye Downs Speedway.
24	William Byron (R)	Hendrick Motorsports	Chevrolet	Axalta Coating Systems – Jeff Gordon's iconic 1993–2000 “Rainbow Warriors” car
31	Ryan Newman	Richard Childress Racing	Chevrolet	Caterpillar Inc. – Neil Bonnett's 1993 car
32	Matt DiBenedetto	Go Fas Racing	Ford	Keen Parts/CorvetteParts.net – Jeff Burton's 2000 car
34	Michael McDowell	Front Row Motorsports	Ford	Love's Travel Stops & Country Stores – Scheme pays tribute to Love's first travel stop in Amarillo, Texas in 1981.
37	Chris Buescher	JTG Daugherty Racing	Chevrolet	Scheme dedicated to the 110th anniversary of Bush's Best Beans.
38	David Ragan	Front Row Motorsports	Ford	Citgo – Dale Jarrett's 1991 Champion Spark Plug 400 winning car, which was his first cup win.
41	Kurt Busch	Stewart–Haas Racing	Ford	Haas Automation – Busch's 2003 Carolina Dodge Dealers 400 car, where he was part of one of the closest finishes in NASCAR history at Darlington Raceway.
42	Kyle Larson	Chip Ganassi Racing	Chevrolet	DC Solar – Davey Allison inspired car
43	Bubba Wallace (R)	Richard Petty Motorsports	Chevrolet	STP – Richard Petty's 1972 car with STP day glo red
47	A. J. Allmendinger	JTG Daugherty Racing	Chevrolet	Kroger – Robert Pressley's 1998 NASCAR Busch Series car
48	Jimmie Johnson	Hendrick Motorsports	Chevrolet	Lowe's/Kobalt (tools) – Johnson's 2012 Bojangles' Southern 500 winning car
51	B. J. McLeod (i)	Rick Ware Racing	Chevrolet	Jacob Companies – Days of Thunder antagonist Russ Wheeler's Hardee's-themed replica car
52	J. J. Yeley (i)	Rick Ware Racing	Chevrolet	Trading View
66	Timmy Hill (i)	MBM Motorsports	Toyota	Rewards.com – Darrell Waltrip's 2000 car.
72	Corey LaJoie	TriStar Motorsports	Chevrolet	Blockchain Terminal – Father Randy LaJoie's 1996–1998 NASCAR Busch Series car
78	Martin Truex Jr.	Furniture Row Racing	Toyota	Bass Pro Shops/5-hour Energy
88	Alex Bowman	Hendrick Motorsports	Chevrolet	LLumar
95	Kasey Kahne	Leavine Family Racing	Chevrolet	Dumont Jets – Kahne's 2006 car
96	Jeffrey Earnhardt	Gaunt Brothers Racing	Toyota	Xtreme Concepts/Project K9 Hero/Nine Line Apparel – Grandfather Dale Earnhardt's 1978 car
99	Derrike Cope	StarCom Racing	Chevrolet	Bojangles' Famous Chicken 'n Biscuits – Cope's 1993 car
Official entry list

== Practice ==
=== First practice ===
Denny Hamlin was the fastest in the first practice session with a time of 28.543 seconds and a speed of 172.287 mph (277.269 km/h).

Pos	No.	Driver	Team	Manufacturer	Time	Speed
1	11	Denny Hamlin	Joe Gibbs Racing	Toyota	28.543	172.287
2	42	Kyle Larson	Chip Ganassi Racing	Chevrolet	28.585	172.034
3	2	Brad Keselowski	Team Penske	Ford	28.591	171.998
Official first practice results

=== Final practice ===
Ryan Newman was the fastest in the final practice session with a time of 28.641 seconds and a speed of 171.698 mph (276.321 km/h).

Pos	No.	Driver	Team	Manufacturer	Time	Speed
1	31	Ryan Newman	Richard Childress Racing	Chevrolet	28.641	171.698
2	9	Chase Elliott	Hendrick Motorsports	Chevrolet	28.672	171.512
3	48	Jimmie Johnson	Hendrick Motorsports	Chevrolet	28.754	171.023
Official final practice results

== Qualifying ==
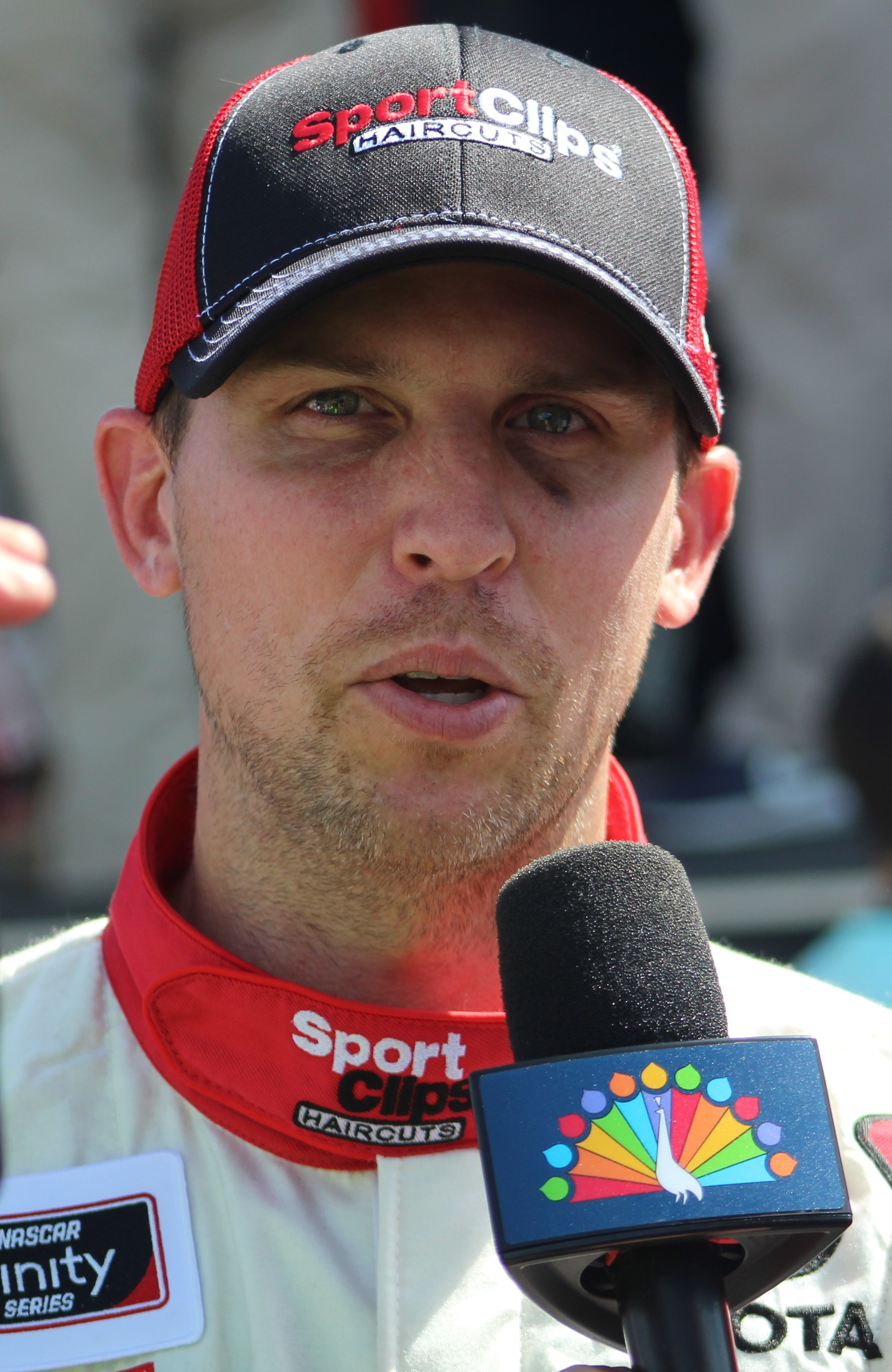
Denny Hamlin scored the pole position.

Denny Hamlin scored the pole for the race with a time of 28.332 and a speed of 173.571 mph (279.335 km/h).

=== Qualifying results ===
Pos	No.	Driver	Team	Manufacturer	R1	R2	R3
1	11	Denny Hamlin	Joe Gibbs Racing	Toyota	28.207	28.266	28.332
2	42	Kyle Larson	Chip Ganassi Racing	Chevrolet	27.908	28.217	28.358
3	78	Martin Truex Jr.	Furniture Row Racing	Toyota	28.381	28.376	28.392
4	88	Alex Bowman	Hendrick Motorsports	Chevrolet	28.006	28.161	28.400
5	18	Kyle Busch	Joe Gibbs Racing	Toyota	28.255	28.314	28.415
6	31	Ryan Newman	Richard Childress Racing	Chevrolet	28.215	28.313	28.453
7	20	Erik Jones	Joe Gibbs Racing	Toyota	28.422	28.344	28.506
8	22	Joey Logano	Team Penske	Ford	28.219	28.347	28.507
9	41	Kurt Busch	Stewart–Haas Racing	Ford	28.191	28.411	28.535
10	24	William Byron (R)	Hendrick Motorsports	Chevrolet	27.997	28.390	28.550
11	9	Chase Elliott	Hendrick Motorsports	Chevrolet	28.116	28.236	28.694
12	10	Aric Almirola	Stewart–Haas Racing	Ford	28.405	28.420	28.922
13	2	Brad Keselowski	Team Penske	Ford	28.360	28.460	—
14	21	Paul Menard	Wood Brothers Racing	Ford	28.250	28.505	—
15	6	Matt Kenseth	Roush Fenway Racing	Ford	28.299	28.512	—
16	19	Daniel Suárez	Joe Gibbs Racing	Toyota	28.375	28.523	—
17	14	Clint Bowyer	Stewart–Haas Racing	Ford	28.356	28.547	—
18	3	Austin Dillon	Richard Childress Racing	Chevrolet	28.421	28.585	—
19	37	Chris Buescher	JTG Daugherty Racing	Chevrolet	28.433	28.621	—
20	48	Jimmie Johnson	Hendrick Motorsports	Chevrolet	28.180	28.635	—
21	12	Ryan Blaney	Team Penske	Ford	28.217	28.663	—
22	4	Kevin Harvick	Stewart–Haas Racing	Ford	28.279	28.667	—
23	38	David Ragan	Front Row Motorsports	Ford	28.365	28.810	—
24	47	A. J. Allmendinger	JTG Daugherty Racing	Chevrolet	28.371	28.830	—
25	17	Ricky Stenhouse Jr.	Roush Fenway Racing	Ford	28.439	—	—
26	34	Michael McDowell	Front Row Motorsports	Ford	28.445	—	—
27	43	Bubba Wallace (R)	Richard Petty Motorsports	Chevrolet	28.489	—	—
28	13	Ty Dillon	Germain Racing	Chevrolet	28.542	—	—
29	95	Kasey Kahne	Leavine Family Racing	Chevrolet	28.585	—	—
30	32	Matt DiBenedetto	Go Fas Racing	Ford	28.622	—	—
31	1	Jamie McMurray	Chip Ganassi Racing	Chevrolet	28.819	—	—
32	52	J. J. Yeley (i)	Rick Ware Racing	Chevrolet	28.854	—	—
33	15	Ross Chastain (i)	Premium Motorsports	Chevrolet	28.928	—	—
34	72	Corey LaJoie	TriStar Motorsports	Chevrolet	29.091	—	—
35	00	Landon Cassill (i)	StarCom Racing	Chevrolet	29.330	—	—
36	66	Timmy Hill (i)	MBM Motorsports	Toyota	30.018	—	—
37	51	B. J. McLeod (i)	Rick Ware Racing	Chevrolet	30.038	—	—
38	99	Derrike Cope	StarCom Racing	Chevrolet	30.662	—	—
39	23	Joey Gase (i)	BK Racing	Toyota	31.781	—	—
40	96	Jeffrey Earnhardt	Gaunt Brothers Racing	Toyota	0.000	—	—
Official qualifying results

== Race ==
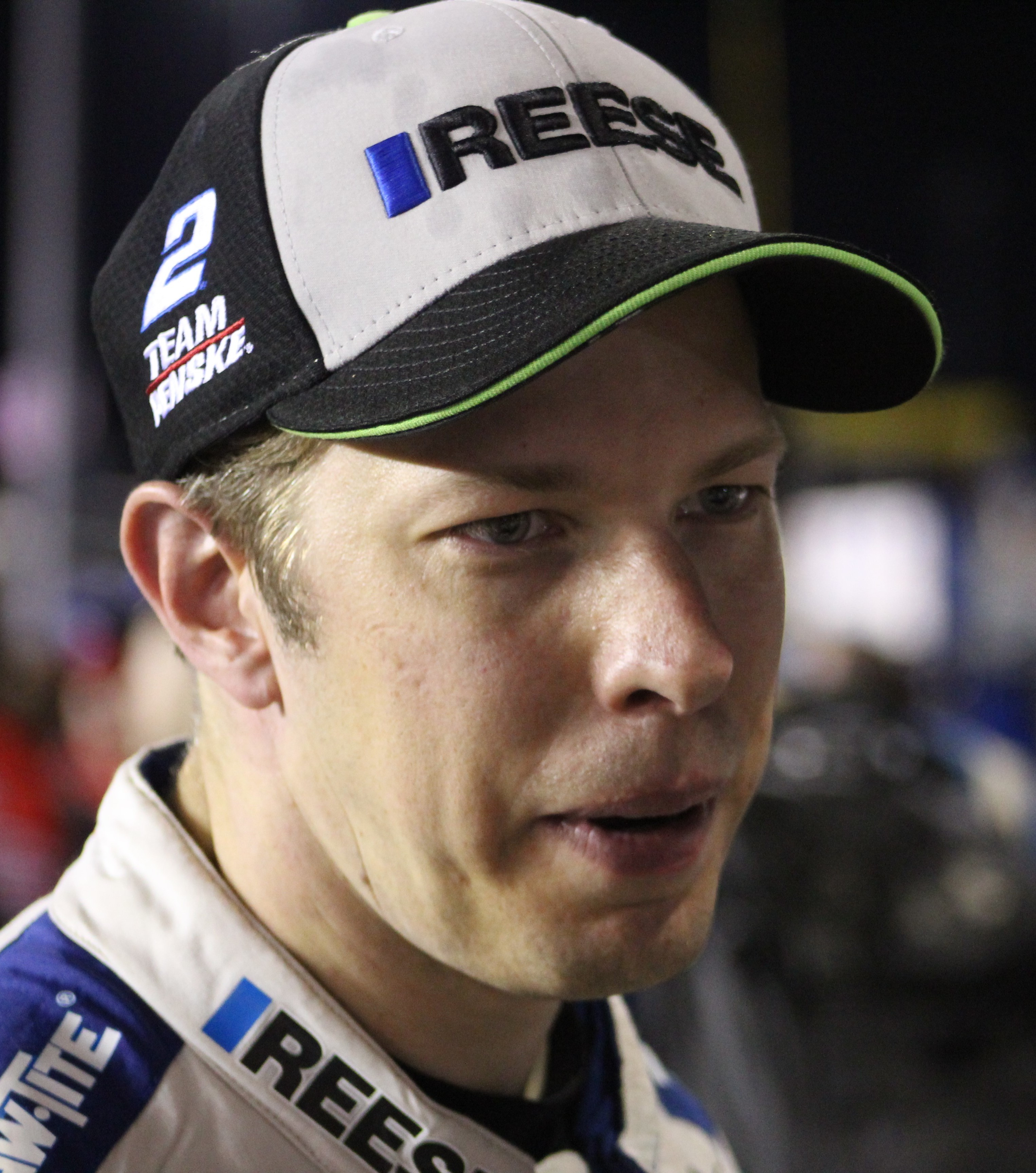
Brad Keselowski won the race.

=== Stage Results ===
Stage 1 Laps: 100

Pos	No	Driver	Team	Manufacturer	Points
1	42	Kyle Larson	Chip Ganassi Racing	Chevrolet	10
2	20	Erik Jones	Joe Gibbs Racing	Toyota	9
3	78	Martin Truex Jr.	Furniture Row Racing	Toyota	8
4	22	Joey Logano	Team Penske	Ford	7
5	2	Brad Keselowski	Team Penske	Ford	6
6	4	Kevin Harvick	Stewart–Haas Racing	Ford	5
7	11	Denny Hamlin	Joe Gibbs Racing	Toyota	4
8	41	Kurt Busch	Stewart–Haas Racing	Ford	3
9	18	Kyle Busch	Joe Gibbs Racing	Toyota	2
10	9	Chase Elliott	Hendrick Motorsports	Chevrolet	1
Official stage one results

Stage 2 Laps: 100

Pos	No	Driver	Team	Manufacturer	Points
1	42	Kyle Larson	Chip Ganassi Racing	Chevrolet	10
2	2	Brad Keselowski	Team Penske	Ford	9
3	22	Joey Logano	Team Penske	Ford	8
4	9	Chase Elliott	Hendrick Motorsports	Chevrolet	7
5	20	Erik Jones	Joe Gibbs Racing	Toyota	6
6	41	Kurt Busch	Stewart–Haas Racing	Ford	5
7	31	Ryan Newman	Richard Childress Racing	Chevrolet	4
8	18	Kyle Busch	Joe Gibbs Racing	Toyota	3
9	1	Jamie McMurray	Chip Ganassi Racing	Chevrolet	2
10	4	Kevin Harvick	Stewart–Haas Racing	Ford	1
Official stage two results

=== Final Stage Results ===
Stage 3 Laps: 167

Pos	Grid	No	Driver	Team	Manufacturer	Laps	Points
1	13	2	Brad Keselowski	Team Penske	Ford	367	55
2	8	22	Joey Logano	Team Penske	Ford	367	50
3	2	42	Kyle Larson	Chip Ganassi Racing	Chevrolet	367	54
4	22	4	Kevin Harvick	Stewart–Haas Racing	Ford	367	39
5	11	9	Chase Elliott	Hendrick Motorsports	Chevrolet	367	40
6	9	41	Kurt Busch	Stewart–Haas Racing	Ford	367	39
7	5	18	Kyle Busch	Joe Gibbs Racing	Toyota	367	35
8	7	20	Erik Jones	Joe Gibbs Racing	Toyota	367	44
9	31	1	Jamie McMurray	Chip Ganassi Racing	Chevrolet	367	30
10	1	11	Denny Hamlin	Joe Gibbs Racing	Toyota	367	31
11	3	78	Martin Truex Jr.	Furniture Row Racing	Toyota	367	34
12	25	17	Ricky Stenhouse Jr.	Roush Fenway Racing	Ford	367	25
13	19	37	Chris Buescher	JTG Daugherty Racing	Chevrolet	367	24
14	12	10	Aric Almirola	Stewart–Haas Racing	Ford	367	23
15	21	12	Ryan Blaney	Team Penske	Ford	367	22
16	18	3	Austin Dillon	Richard Childress Racing	Chevrolet	367	21
17	14	21	Paul Menard	Wood Brothers Racing	Ford	366	20
18	23	38	David Ragan	Front Row Motorsports	Ford	366	19
19	6	31	Ryan Newman	Richard Childress Racing	Chevrolet	366	22
20	26	34	Michael McDowell	Front Row Motorsports	Ford	365	17
21	28	13	Ty Dillon	Germain Racing	Chevrolet	365	16
22	24	47	A. J. Allmendinger	JTG Daugherty Racing	Chevrolet	365	15
23	4	88	Alex Bowman	Hendrick Motorsports	Chevrolet	365	14
24	29	95	Kasey Kahne	Leavine Family Racing	Chevrolet	364	13
25	15	6	Matt Kenseth	Roush Fenway Racing	Ford	364	12
26	27	43	Bubba Wallace (R)	Richard Petty Motorsports	Chevrolet	363	11
27	34	72	Corey LaJoie	TriStar Motorsports	Chevrolet	360	10
28	33	15	Ross Chastain (i)	Premium Motorsports	Chevrolet	360	0
29	16	19	Daniel Suárez	Joe Gibbs Racing	Toyota	358	8
30	35	00	Landon Cassill (i)	StarCom Racing	Chevrolet	357	0
31	32	52	J. J. Yeley (i)	Rick Ware Racing	Chevrolet	350	0
32	37	51	B. J. McLeod (i)	Rick Ware Racing	Chevrolet	347	0
33	38	99	Derrike Cope	StarCom Racing	Chevrolet	346	4
34	40	96	Jeffrey Earnhardt	Gaunt Brothers Racing	Toyota	344	3
35	10	24	William Byron (R)	Hendrick Motorsports	Chevrolet	329	2
36	17	14	Clint Bowyer	Stewart–Haas Racing	Ford	309	1
37	36	66	Timmy Hill (i)	MBM Motorsports	Toyota	268	0
38	30	32	Matt DiBenedetto	Go Fas Racing	Ford	254	1
39	20	48	Jimmie Johnson	Hendrick Motorsports	Chevrolet	227	1
40	39	23	Joey Gase (i)	BK Racing	Toyota	120	0
Official race results

=== Race statistics ===
- Lead changes: 5 among different drivers
- Cautions/Laps: 6 for 35
- Red flags: 0
- Time of race: 3 hours, 48 minutes and 54 seconds
- Average speed: 131.408 miles per hour (211.481 km/h)

== Media ==
=== Television ===
NBC Sports covered the race on the television side. Steve Letarte, two–time Darlington winner Jeff Burton and Dale Earnhardt Jr. had the call in the booth for the race. Rick Allen, three-time Darlington winner Dale Jarrett and Kyle Petty called from the NBC Peacock Pit Box on pit road. Jarrett and Petty also join Earnhardt in the booth for a portion of the race. Dave Burns, Parker Kligerman, Marty Snider and Kelli Stavast reported from pit lane during the race.

NBCSN
Booth announcers	Pit reporters
Lap-by-lap: Steve Letarte; Color-commentator: Jeff Burton; Color-commentator: Dale Earnhardt Jr. NBC Peacock Pitbox: Rick Allen; NBC Peacock Pitbox: Dale Jarrett; NBC Peacock Pitbox: Kyle Petty	Dave Burns; Parker Kligerman; Marty Snider; Kelli Stavast

=== Radio ===
The Motor Racing Network had the radio call for the race, which was simulcast on Sirius XM NASCAR Radio. Dave Moody called the race from a Billboard outside of turn when the field raced through turns 1 and 2, and Mike Bagley had the call of the race atop of the Darlington Raceway Club outside of turn 3 when the field raced through turns 3 and 4

MRN
Booth announcers	Turn announcers	Pit reporters
Lead announcer: Joe Moore; Announcer: Jeff Striegle; Announcer: Rusty Wallace	Turns 1 & 2: Dave Moody; Turns 3 & 4: Mike Bagley	Alex Hayden; Winston Kelley; Steve Post

== Standings after the race ==
Drivers' Championship standings

	Pos	Driver	Points
	1	Kyle Busch	1,038
	2	Kevin Harvick	999 (–39)
	3	Martin Truex Jr.	883 (–155)
	4	Kurt Busch	835 (–203)
1	5	Joey Logano	818 (–220)
2	6	Brad Keselowski	785 (–253)
2	7	Kyle Larson	783 (–255)
3	8	Clint Bowyer	777 (–261)
2	9	Ryan Blaney	755 (–283)
	10	Denny Hamlin	738 (–300)
	11	Chase Elliott	737 (–301)
	12	Aric Almirola	681 (–357)
	13	Erik Jones	679 (–359)
	14	Jimmie Johnson	605 (–433)
	15	Alex Bowman	586 (–452)
	16	Ricky Stenhouse Jr.	518 (–520)
Official driver's standings

Manufacturers' Championship standings

Pos	Manufacturer	Points
1	Toyota	906
2	Ford	895 (–11)
3	Chevrolet	817 (–89)
Official manufacturers' standings

- Note: Only the first 16 positions are included for the driver standings.
- . – Driver has clinched a position in the Monster Energy NASCAR Cup Series playoffs.

Previous race: 2018 Bass Pro Shops NRA Night Race	Monster Energy NASCAR Cup Series; 2018 season	Next race: 2018 Brickyard 400
