= 2023 NASCAR Whelen Euro Series =

European auto racing season

Locations of the circuits that hosted a NASCAR Whelen Euro Series race in 2023

The 2023 NASCAR Whelen Euro Series was the fifteenth Racecar Euro Series season, and the eleventh under the NASCAR Whelen Euro Series branding. The season started on 6 May with the Valencia NASCAR Fest at Circuit Ricardo Tormo and ended on 15 October with the EuroNASCAR Finals at Circuit Zolder.

Alon Day and Liam Hezemans did not defend their championship titles in the EuroNASCAR PRO and EuroNASCAR 2 divisions respectively, making it the first season since 2015 where neither of the reigning champion competed in the season that followed. Gianmarco Ercoli, who scored three victories in 2023, secured his first EuroNASCAR PRO championship title after he finished fourth in the final race at Zolder. Ercoli became the first driver to win the championship title in both divisions as he had already previously won the EuroNASCAR 2 title in the aforementioned 2015 season.

The championship battle did see some controversy as SpeedHouse Racing's owner-driver Lucas Lasserre, who entered the final race as the championship leader, had a late collision with Gianmarco's younger brother Mario Ercoli. It was later announced that the collision had no effect on the final standings because Lasserre was hit with a post-race penalty for start procedure infringements. Lasserre managed to finish second regardless with two victories, securing his best championship finish in the NASCAR sanctioned years of EuroNASCAR. Vittorio Ghirelli finished third after scoring two victories, one a piece in Vallelunga and Most. Anthony Kumpen was fourth in his first full-season campaign since 2017 ahead of Hezemans, who won the season opening race at Valencia. Tobias Dauenhauer and Paul Jouffreau took two race wins each, with the latter becoming the youngest race winner in EuroNASCAR PRO at the age of 19.

Jouffreau was also crowned as the EuroNASCAR 2 champion after winning the final race, giving him enough points to overhaul long-time season leader Vladimiros Tziortzis. Jouffreau had three wins compared to Tziortzis' five, but the Frenchman finished every single race inside the top-10 while Tziortzis had three results where he was classified outside of the top-10. Gil Linster finished third after securing his first victory of his career at Zolder. He was followed by Patrick Schober, who also took his first career victory at Oschersleben, and 2021 champion Martin Doubek. Italian YouTuber Alberto Naska scored two victories, but a disastrous final races of the season resulted in him only finishing sixth in the standings.

Hendriks' four-year streak in the Team's Championship was stopped by RDV Competition, who claimed their second Team's title with the No. 3 team of Jouffreau and Frédéric Gabillon. CAAL Racing's No. 54 team, driven by Ercoli and Naska, finished second while Hendriks was third with the No. 50 team of Hezemans and Linster.

== Teams and drivers ==
NASCAR Whelen Euro Series released a provisional 31-car entry list for the teams participating on 5 April 2023.

=== EuroNASCAR PRO ===
Team	No.	Body Style	Race Driver	Rounds
(Italy) Academy Motorsport	1	Ford Mustang	(India) Advait Deodhar	1–3
(Italy) Academy Motorsport	1	Ford Mustang	(Slovakia) Michaela Dorcikova	4
(Italy) Academy Motorsport	5	EuroNASCAR FJ 2020	(Cyprus) Vladimiros Tziortzis	All
(France) RDV Competition	3	Ford Mustang	(France) Frédéric Gabillon	1–2
(France) RDV Competition	3	Ford Mustang	(France) Paul Jouffreau	3–6
(France) Panasport	4	Chevrolet Camaro	(France) Yannick Panagiotis	3
(Netherlands) Hendriks Motorsport	7	Ford Mustang	(Czech Republic) Martin Doubek	All
(Netherlands) Hendriks Motorsport	50	Toyota Camry	(Netherlands) Liam Hezemans	All
(Italy) Vict Motorsport	8	Chevrolet Camaro	(Italy) Dario Caso	1, 3–6
(Italy) Vict Motorsport	9	Chevrolet Camaro	(Italy) Simone Laureti	1, 3
(Italy) Vict Motorsport	9	Chevrolet Camaro	(Italy) Mario Ercoli	6
(France) SpeedHouse Racing	14	Ford Mustang	(France) Ulysse Delsaux	All
(France) SpeedHouse Racing	40	Ford Mustang	(France) Néo Lambert	1–4, 6
(France) SpeedHouse Racing	64	Ford Mustang	(France) Lucas Lasserre	All
(Switzerland) Race Art Technology	18	Ford Mustang	(Switzerland) Giorgio Maggi	All
(Switzerland) Race Art Technology	34	Chevrolet Camaro	(Switzerland) Thomas Toffel	All
(Belgium) PK Carsport	24	Chevrolet Camaro	(Belgium) Anthony Kumpen	All
(Italy) Double V Racing	27	Ford Mustang	(Italy) Stefano Attianese	1–3
(Germany) 3F Racing	30	Chevrolet Camaro	(United States) Ryan Vargas	5–6
(Italy) Double T	38	Chevrolet Camaro	(Italy) Cesare Balistreri	3
(Germany) Marko Stipp Motorsport	46	Chevrolet Camaro	(Greece) Thomas Krasonis	All
(Germany) Marko Stipp Motorsport	48	Chevrolet Camaro	(Portugal) Miguel Gomes	1
(Germany) Marko Stipp Motorsport	48	Chevrolet Camaro	(Ukraine) Yevgen Sokolovskiy	2, 6
(Germany) Marko Stipp Motorsport	48	Chevrolet Camaro	(Finland) Tuomas Pöntinen	3, 5
(Germany) Marko Stipp Motorsport	48	Chevrolet Camaro	(United Kingdom) Jack Davidson	4
(Italy) CAAL Racing	54	Chevrolet Camaro	(Italy) Gianmarco Ercoli	All
(Italy) CAAL Racing	56	Chevrolet Camaro	(Belgium) Marc Goossens	1–3, 5–6
(Italy) CAAL Racing	88	Chevrolet Camaro	(Italy) Max Lanza	1–5
(Italy) The Club Motorsport	55	Chevrolet Camaro	(Italy) Fabrizio Armetta	All
(Italy) The Club Motorsport	65	Chevrolet Camaro	(Italy) Riccardo Romagnoli	All
(Switzerland) Racingfuel Motorsport	58	Chevrolet Camaro	(Switzerland) Christoph Lenz	1, 3
(Switzerland) Racingfuel Motorsport	58	Chevrolet Camaro	(United Kingdom) Matthew Ellis	2
(Switzerland) Racingfuel Motorsport	94	Chevrolet Camaro	(Austria) Alina Loibnegger	1–3
(Netherlands) Team Bleekemolen	66	Chevrolet Camaro	(France) Thomas Dombrowski	1–2, 5–6
(Netherlands) Team Bleekemolen	69	Ford Mustang	(Netherlands) Sebastiaan Bleekemolen	All
(Netherlands) Team Bleekemolen	72	Chevrolet Camaro 1 Toyota Camry 5	(Italy) Vittorio Ghirelli	All
Team Japan Needs24	74	Toyota Camry	(Japan) Kenko Miura	1
(France) Uber Modern Racing	75	Chevrolet Camaro	(France) Hugo Fleury	3, 6
(Bulgaria) Bulgarian Team	90	Chevrolet Camaro	(Slovakia) Michaela Dorcikova	1
(Germany) Bremotion	99	Chevrolet Camaro	(Germany) Tobias Dauenhauer	2–6

=== EuroNASCAR 2 ===
Team	No.	Body Style	Race Driver	Rounds
(Italy) Academy Motorsport	1	Ford Mustang	(Australia) Max Mason	2–3
(Italy) Academy Motorsport	1	Ford Mustang	(Croatia) Stefani Mogorović	4
(Italy) Academy Motorsport	1	Ford Mustang	(Italy) Federico Monti	6
(Italy) Academy Motorsport	5	EuroNASCAR FJ 2020	(Cyprus) Vladimiros Tziortzis	All
(France) RDV Competition	3	Ford Mustang	(France) Paul Jouffreau	All
(France) Panasport	4	Chevrolet Camaro	(France) Olivier Panagiotis	3
(Netherlands) Hendriks Motorsport	7	Ford Mustang	(Czech Republic) Martin Doubek	All
(Netherlands) Hendriks Motorsport	50	Toyota Camry	(Luxembourg) Gil Linster	All
(Italy) Vict Motorsport	8	Chevrolet Camaro	(Italy) Paolo Valeri	1, 3–4, 6
(Italy) Vict Motorsport	8	Chevrolet Camaro	(Italy) Mario Ercoli	5
(Italy) Vict Motorsport	9	Chevrolet Camaro	(Italy) Dario Caso	1
(Italy) Vict Motorsport	9	Chevrolet Camaro	(Italy) Valerio Marzi	3–4
(Italy) Vict Motorsport	9	Chevrolet Camaro	(Italy) Mario Ercoli	6
(France) SpeedHouse Racing	14	Ford Mustang	(Italy) Arianna Casoli	All
(France) SpeedHouse Racing	40	Ford Mustang	(Germany) Matthias Hauer	1–2, 4–6
(France) SpeedHouse Racing	40	Ford Mustang	(Italy) Igor Sicuro	3
(France) SpeedHouse Racing	64	Ford Mustang	(France) Eric Quintal	1, 3–6
(France) SpeedHouse Racing	64	Ford Mustang	(Italy) Igor Sicuro	2
(Switzerland) Race Art Technology	18	Ford Mustang	(Italy) Claudio Remigio Cappelli	All
(Switzerland) Race Art Technology	34	Chevrolet Camaro	(Switzerland) Thomas Toffel	All
(Italy) Double V Racing	27	Ford Mustang	(Austria) Patrick Schober	All
(Italy) Double T	38	Chevrolet Camaro	(Italy) Cesare Balistreri	3
(Germany) Marko Stipp Motorsport	46	Chevrolet Camaro	(Brazil) Nick Schneider	1–5
(Germany) Marko Stipp Motorsport	46	Chevrolet Camaro	(United States) Nick Strickler	6
(Germany) Marko Stipp Motorsport	48	Chevrolet Camaro	(United Kingdom) Jack Davidson	All
(Italy) CAAL Racing	54	Chevrolet Camaro	(Italy) Alberto "Naska" Fontana	All
(Italy) CAAL Racing	56	Chevrolet Camaro	(Belgium) Sven van Laere	All
(Italy) CAAL Racing	88	Chevrolet Camaro	(Italy) Roberto Benedetti	All
(Italy) The Club Motorsport	55	Chevrolet Camaro	(Italy) Fabrizio Armetta	1, 6
(Italy) The Club Motorsport	55	Chevrolet Camaro	(France) Victor Neumann	2
(Italy) The Club Motorsport	65	Chevrolet Camaro	(Italy) Riccardo Romagnoli	All
(Switzerland) Racingfuel Motorsport	58	Chevrolet Camaro	(Australia) Max Mason	1
(Switzerland) Racingfuel Motorsport	94	Chevrolet Camaro	(United States) Nick Strickler	1–3
(Netherlands) Team Bleekemolen	66	Chevrolet Camaro	(France) Thomas Dombrowski	All
(Netherlands) Team Bleekemolen	69	Ford Mustang	(Netherlands) Melvin de Groot	2–6
(Netherlands) Team Bleekemolen	72	Chevrolet Camaro 1 Toyota Camry 5	(Netherlands) Michael Bleekemolen	All
Team Japan Needs24	74	Toyota Camry	(Japan) Kenko Miura	1
(France) Uber Modern Racing	75	Chevrolet Camaro	(France) Olivier Bec	3, 6
(Germany) Bremotion	99	Chevrolet Camaro	(United Kingdom) Gordon Barnes	2
(Germany) Bremotion	99	Chevrolet Camaro	(Austria) Alina Loibnegger	4
(Germany) Bremotion	99	Chevrolet Camaro	(Germany) Dominique Schaak	5
(Germany) Bremotion	99	Chevrolet Camaro	(Belgium) Eric de Doncker	6

=== EuroNASCAR Club Challenge ===
Team	No.	Body Style	Race Driver	Rounds
(Italy) Academy Motorsport	1	Ford Mustang	(Italy) Federico Monti	All
(Italy) Academy Motorsport	5	EuroNASCAR FJ 2020	(Cyprus) Vladimiros Tziortzis	4–5
(France) RDV Competition	4	Chevrolet Camaro	(France) Yann Schar	1
(France) RDV Competition	74	Toyota Camry	(France) Frédéric Rouvière	5
(Italy) Vict Motorsport	8	Chevrolet Camaro	(Italy) Mario Ercoli	4
(France) SpeedHouse	14	Ford Mustang	(Italy) Arianna Casoli	All
(France) SpeedHouse	40	Ford Mustang	(France) Alain Mosqueron	All
(France) SpeedHouse	64	Ford Mustang	(France) Florian Richard	All
(Switzerland) Race Art Technology	18	Ford Mustang	(Switzerland) Giorgio Maggi	4–5
(Switzerland) Race Art Technology	34	Chevrolet Camaro	(Switzerland) Edouard Fatio	All
(Belgium) PK Carsport	24	Chevrolet Camaro	(Belgium) Anthony Kumpen	2, 4–5
(Italy) Double V Racing	27	Ford Mustang	(Austria) Viktor Schiffer	All
(Germany) 3F Racing	30	Chevrolet Camaro	(United States) Ryan Vargas	4–5
(Germany) Marko Stipp Motorsport	46	Chevrolet Camaro	(United Kingdom) Gordon Barnes	2–5
(Germany) Marko Stipp Motorsport	48	Chevrolet Camaro	(United Kingdom) Gordon Barnes	1
(Germany) Marko Stipp Motorsport	48	Chevrolet Camaro	(United Kingdom) Jack Davidson	2, 5
(Italy) CAAL Racing	54	Chevrolet Camaro	(Italy) Gianmarco Ercoli	4–5
(Italy) CAAL Racing	54	Chevrolet Camaro	(Italy) Alberto "Naska" Fontana	4–5
(Italy) CAAL Racing	56	Chevrolet Camaro	(Belgium) Marc Goossens	4
(Italy) CAAL Racing	56	Chevrolet Camaro	(Belgium) Sven van Laere	4–5
(Italy) CAAL Racing	88	Chevrolet Camaro	(Italy) Max Lanza	4
(Italy) CAAL Racing	88	Chevrolet Camaro	(Italy) Roberto Benedetti	4
(Italy) CAAL Racing	88	Chevrolet Camaro	(Netherlands) Reza Sardeha	5
(Netherlands) Team Bleekemolen	66	Chevrolet Camaro	(France) Thomas Dombrowski	3–5
(Netherlands) Team Bleekemolen	69	Ford Mustang	(Netherlands) Sebastiaan Bleekemolen	3–5
(Netherlands) Team Bleekemolen	69	Ford Mustang	(Netherlands) Melvin de Groot	5
(Netherlands) Team Bleekemolen	72	Toyota Camry	(Italy) Vittorio Ghirelli	3–5
(Netherlands) Team Bleekemolen	72	Toyota Camry	(Netherlands) Michael Bleekemolen	5
Team Japan Needs24	74	Toyota Camry	(Japan) Kenko Miura	1
(France) Uber Modern Racing	75	Chevrolet Camaro	(France) Hugo Fleury	2, 5
(France) Uber Modern Racing	75	Chevrolet Camaro	(France) Olivier Bec	2, 5
(Switzerland) Racingfuel Motorsport	94	Chevrolet Camaro	(Italy) Loris Cencetti	2
(Germany) Bremotion	99	Chevrolet Camaro	(Austria) Constantin Schöll	5

=== Confirmed changes ===
==== Drivers ====
- On 5 October 2022, former two-time series champion Anthony Kumpen announced to Autosport.be that he will be returning to the series on a full-time basis in 2023, having previously made his return to the NASCAR Whelen Euro Series during last year's round at Circuit Zolder. It is scheduled to be Kumpen's first full-time season since 2017 and his first planned full-time season participation since 2018, which he was unable to complete after he was suspended for four years by the Royal Automobile Club of Belgium for failing a drug test during the 2018 24 Hours of Zolder. The announcement of the provisional Entry List on 4 April 2023 confirmed that Kumpen will be replacing Alon Day as PK Carsport's sole full-time driver in EuroNASCAR PRO. Day's status for 2023 is currently unknown.
- On 10 October 2022, Thomas Krasonis announced that he would be leaving the series to compete in the United States in 2023. Krasonis is currently scheduled to make his ARCA Menards Series and NASCAR Craftsman Truck Series debut in 2023 for a currently unannounced team.
- On 28 October 2022, just after the conclusion of the 2022 EuroNASCAR Club Challenge season, Néo Lambert announced his plans to compete in the EuroNASCAR 2 season with SpeedHouse for 2023. It was subsequently revealed on 28 April 2023 that Lambert will be racing in EuroNASCAR PRO instead of EuroNASCAR 2, where he is due to race the No. 40 Ford Mustang.
- On 5 December 2022, it was announced that Vladimiros Tziortzis will be stepping up to the EuroNASCAR PRO class for 2023. Tziortzis will become the new EuroNASCAR PRO driver of Academy's No. 5 team, replacing Patrick Lemarié whose status for 2023 is currently unknown.
- On 15 December 2022, Double T Racing announced that Leonardo Colavita and Double T Racing will be leaving NASCAR Whelen Euro Series to join the Italian GT Championship's GT Cup class in 2023.
- On 16 February 2023, it was announced that Australian driver Max Mason will be joining the EuroNASCAR 2 championship in 2023. It was subsequently announced on 21 March 2023 that Mason will be joining Racingfuel Motorsport as the full-time driver of the No. 58 Chevrolet in 2023. He will be joined by American driver Nick Strickler, who is set to compete with the No. 94 Chevrolet in 2023.
- On 9 March 2023, it was announced that reigning EuroNASCAR 2 champion Liam Hezemans will be moving up to the EuroNASCAR PRO division for a full-time switch in 2023. Liam previously competed double duty on both EuroNASCAR PRO and EuroNASCAR 2 in 2022.
- On 15 March 2023, Marko Stipp Motorsport announced that the team has signed German-Brazilian driver Nick Schneider for the 2023 season. Schneider, who competed in the DMV BMW 318ti Cup last year under a Brazilian racing license, is set to compete in the EuroNASCAR 2 division.
- On 24 March 2023, it was announced that Alberto Naska will be driving CAAL Racing's No. 54 team for the 2023 season. Naska competed with CAAL's No. 88 team in 2022.
- On 25 March 2023, it was announced that Paul Jouffreau will be switching teams to RDV Competition despite having a two-year contract with SpeedHouse. Jouffreau will be replacing Ulysse Delsaux as RDV's new EuroNASCAR 2 driver. Delsaux himself will be moving to SpeedHouse Racing, with the former EuroNASCAR 2 champion being set to replace Alexander Graff as the EuroNASCAR PRO class driver of the No. 64 team.
- On 27 March 2023, it was announced that Marc Goossens will be returning to CAAL Racing after spending a season with SpeedHouse. Goossens will be joined by Sven van Laere, who is set to make his first full-season campaign in EuroNASCAR after making his debut at Circuit Zolder in 2019.
- On 29 March 2023, it was announced that Alina Loibnegger is set to compete in EuroNASCAR PRO with Racingfuel Motorsport after two seasons of competition in the EuroNASCAR 2 division.
- On 8 April 2023, it was announced that Gil Linster will be switching teams to Hendriks Motorsport. Linster is set to partner Liam Hezemans in the No. 50 Toyota Camry team, which will carry sponsorship from Chinese cryptocurrency company Binance.
- On 9 April 2023, Marko Stipp Motorsport announced that the team has signed Greek driver Thomas Krasonis as one of their drivers in the EuroNASCAR PRO division for the 2023 season.
- On 13 April 2023, it was announced that Kenko Miura will be making his full-time return in EuroNASCAR as an owner-driver for Team Japan Needs24.
- On 17 April 2023, Team Bleekemolen announced that they have signed Vittorio Ghirelli to race the team's No. 72 Chevrolet Camaro in the EuroNASCAR PRO division for 2023. Ghirelli had previously raced with Not Only Motorsport in 2022.
- On 23 April 2023, Race Art Technology announced that Claudio Remigio Cappelli and Thomas Toffel will be joining the team as full-time competitors in the No. 18 and No. 34 cars respectively. Cappelli, who raced for both Race Art and MK1 Racing Italia in 2022, will be focusing his efforts solely in the EuroNASCAR 2 division while Toffel is set to be competing in both EuroNASCAR PRO and EuroNASCAR 2.
- On 28 April 2023, Italian motorsport news website Erregimedia reports that Advait Deodhar has been signed by Academy Motorsport to race the team's No. 1 car in the EuroNASCAR PRO division. Deodhar, who competed in EuroNASCAR 2 last year, will be scheduled to make his debut in EuroNASCAR's top division as a result.

==== Teams ====
- On 15 December 2022, Double T Racing announced that they will be leaving the series and make the switch to the Italian GT Championship in 2023.
- On 29 December 2022, German automotive tuning firm Bremotion announced their intention to enter NASCAR Whelen Euro Series as a single-car team in 2023. Bremotion will be receiving technical support and cooperation from both Hendriks Motorsport and Team Hezeberg for their debut season.
- On 24 February 2023, Team Bulgaria announced that they will be joining the NASCAR Whelen Euro Series in 2023, fielding the No. 90 Toyota Camry for their debut season.
- The announcement of the provisional Entry List on 4 April 2023 revealed the following changes:
  - Buggyra ZM Racing and MK1 Racing Italia will be leaving the series after a year and a three-year stay respectively.
  - Team Bulgaria acquired a second entry in the No. 89 team, effectively taking over the entries from Not Only Motorsport who fielded both the No. 89 and the No. 90 teams in 2022.
  - Team Japan Needs24 will be attempting their first full-season campaign in EuroNASCAR. Team Japan had previously entered the 2022 round at Circuit Zolder as a one-off entry.
  - Racers Motorsport will be rebranded back to Vict Motorsport.
  - Academy Motorsport is downscaling to two cars with the decision to shut down the No. 2 team for 2023.
  - Team Bleekemolen will be downscaling to three cars, losing the No. 23 and No. 44 teams that were entered in a collaboration with Finnish racing firm Iceboys and replacing it with a new team in the No. 66 car.
  - Race Art Technology will expand their team with the addition of the No. 34 car in 2023.

==== Mid-season changes ====
- Max Mason switched teams to Academy Motorsport for both the Brands Hatch and Vallelunga rounds, racing the team's No. 1 Ford Mustang instead of Racingfuel Motorsport's No. 58 Chevrolet Camaro.
- On 27 June 2023, it was announced that Frédéric Gabillon will not complete his planned 2023 EuroNASCAR PRO season campaign due to sponsorship issues. Paul Jouffreau will be running double duty and replace Gabillon in RDV Competition's No. 3 EuroNASCAR PRO seat for the rest of the season.
- On 19 August 2023, it was announced that Academy Motorsport will be fielding an all-female driver line-up in the team's No. 1 Ford Mustang for NASCAR GP Czech Republic, the first all-female line-up in ten years. Michaela Dorcikova returns to the team in EuroNASCAR PRO while Stefani Mogorović will make her debut in EuroNASCAR 2.
- Alina Loibnegger briefly returned to the EuroNASCAR 2 division for the NASCAR GP Czech Republic as her main team Racingfuel Motorsport did not enter the round due to the damage sustained by the team's chassis in the previous round at Vallelunga. Loibnegger joined Bremotion and acted as the teammate of Tobias Dauenhauer in the No. 99 Chevrolet Camaro.
- Marc Goossens missed the NASCAR GP Czech Republic because of a schedule clash with the 24 Hours of Zolder. He was not replaced, leaving Sven van Laere as the sole competitor of the No. 56 CAAL Racing Chevrolet at Most.
- Max Lanza did not take part in the EuroNASCAR Finals at Circuit Zolder for family reasons. He was not replaced, leaving Roberto Benedetti as the sole driver of the No. 88 CAAL Racing Chevrolet.

== Schedule ==
The provisional calendar for the 2023 season was announced on 25 October 2022. All races of the 2023 season will be held on road courses, although the Arctic Ice Race non-championship event would be planned to be held on an ice surface.

=== EuroNASCAR PRO ===
Round		Race title	Track	Date
1	R1	NASCAR GP Spain – Valencia NASCAR Fest	(Spain) Circuit Ricardo Tormo, Valencia	6 May
1	R2	NASCAR GP Spain – Valencia NASCAR Fest	(Spain) Circuit Ricardo Tormo, Valencia	7 May
2	R3	NASCAR GP UK – American SpeedFest 10, Powered by Lucas Oil	(United Kingdom) Brands Hatch (Indy), West Kingsdown	17 June
2	R4	NASCAR GP UK – American SpeedFest 10, Powered by Lucas Oil	(United Kingdom) Brands Hatch (Indy), West Kingsdown	18 June
3	R5	NASCAR GP Italy – American Festival of Rome	(Italy) Autodromo Vallelunga, Campagnano di Roma	8 July
3	R6	NASCAR GP Italy – American Festival of Rome	(Italy) Autodromo Vallelunga, Campagnano di Roma	9 July
4	R7	NASCAR GP Czech Republic – Autodrom Most NASCAR Show	(Czech Republic) Autodrom Most, Most	26 August
4	R8	NASCAR GP Czech Republic – Autodrom Most NASCAR Show	(Czech Republic) Autodrom Most, Most	27 August
5	R9	NASCAR GP Germany	(Germany) Motorsport Arena Oschersleben, Oschersleben	23 September
5	R10	NASCAR GP Germany	(Germany) Motorsport Arena Oschersleben, Oschersleben	24 September
6	R11	EuroNASCAR Finals – NASCAR GP Belgium	(Belgium) Circuit Zolder, Heusden-Zolder	14 October
6	R12	EuroNASCAR Finals – NASCAR GP Belgium	(Belgium) Circuit Zolder, Heusden-Zolder	15 October

=== EuroNASCAR 2 ===
Round		Race title	Track	Date
1	R1	NASCAR GP Spain – Valencia NASCAR Fest	(Spain) Circuit Ricardo Tormo, Valencia	6 May
1	R2	NASCAR GP Spain – Valencia NASCAR Fest	(Spain) Circuit Ricardo Tormo, Valencia	7 May
2	R3	NASCAR GP UK – American SpeedFest 10, Powered by Lucas Oil	(United Kingdom) Brands Hatch (Indy), West Kingsdown	17 June
2	R4	NASCAR GP UK – American SpeedFest 10, Powered by Lucas Oil	(United Kingdom) Brands Hatch (Indy), West Kingsdown	18 June
3	R5	NASCAR GP Italy – American Festival of Rome	(Italy) Autodromo Vallelunga, Campagnano di Roma	8 July
3	R6	NASCAR GP Italy – American Festival of Rome	(Italy) Autodromo Vallelunga, Campagnano di Roma	9 July
4	R7	NASCAR GP Czech Republic – Autodrom Most NASCAR Show	(Czech Republic) Autodrom Most, Most	26 August
4	R8	NASCAR GP Czech Republic – Autodrom Most NASCAR Show	(Czech Republic) Autodrom Most, Most	27 August
5	R9	NASCAR GP Germany	(Germany) Motorsport Arena Oschersleben, Oschersleben	23 September
5	R10	NASCAR GP Germany	(Germany) Motorsport Arena Oschersleben, Oschersleben	24 September
6	R11	EuroNASCAR Finals – NASCAR GP Belgium	(Belgium) Circuit Zolder, Heusden-Zolder	14 October
6	R12	EuroNASCAR Finals – NASCAR GP Belgium	(Belgium) Circuit Zolder, Heusden-Zolder	15 October

=== Calendar changes ===
- NASCAR Whelen Euro Series was initially scheduled to be hosting NASCAR's first event on ice with the NASCAR Arctic Ice Race, which was initially scheduled to open the season as an exhibition event on 4–5 March. The announcement follows upon what NASCAR Whelen Euro Series had announced last year where the series plans to host a non-championship Winter Classic event at some point between late 2022 and early 2023. However, on 10 January 2023 it was announced that the race was postponed indefinitely due to global supply chain issues. Had the NASCAR Arctic Ice Race went underway, the race would use the following format that was first announced on 3 December 2022:
  - Six 30-minute long free practice sessions was planned to be held on Friday on a 3.2 km (2.0 mi) long track.
  - A Time Attack tournament was planned to be held on a 2.4 km (1.5 mi) track layout on Saturday, with the results of the tournament determined the starting grid for Sunday's event.
  - A rallycross-style shootout event was planned to be held on Sunday on a 2.0 km (1.2 mi) layout of the track. The shootout would include heat races, semi-finals and finals to determine the overall winner of the event.
- NASCAR GP Germany will be returning to the series after a three-year hiatus. The round will be held on Motorsport Arena Oschersleben for the first time and is currently scheduled to fifth round of the season on 23–24 September.
- NASCAR GP Belgium regained its former status as the final round of the season. Circuit Zolder is scheduled to host EuroNASCAR's season finale for the first time since 2019 and the sixth time in history, having hosted the final round of the season from 2015 to 2019.
- Automotodrom Grobnik loses its status as a championship round and will be scheduled to host an All Star Endurance Race on 11 November. The Endurance Race was later quietly dropped from the schedule, leaving the series with just the six championship rounds.
- NASCAR GP Czech Republic was initially scheduled to be held on 3–4 September, but on 26 November 2022 it was announced that the round will be moved one week ahead to 26–27 August instead.

== Results ==
=== EuroNASCAR PRO ===
Round		Race	Pole position	Fastest lap	Most laps led	Winning driver	Winning team	Winning manufacturer
1	R1	Valencia NASCAR Fest	(Cyprus) Vladimiros Tziortzis	(Italy) Gianmarco Ercoli	(Netherlands) Liam Hezemans	(Netherlands) Liam Hezemans	(Netherlands) Hendriks Motorsport	Toyota
1	R2	Valencia NASCAR Fest	(Italy) Gianmarco Ercoli	(Netherlands) Liam Hezemans	(Italy) Gianmarco Ercoli	(France) Lucas Lasserre	(France) SpeedHouse Racing	Ford
2	R3	American SpeedFest 10	(Italy) Gianmarco Ercoli	(Italy) Gianmarco Ercoli	(Italy) Gianmarco Ercoli	(Italy) Gianmarco Ercoli	(Italy) CAAL Racing	Chevrolet
2	R4	American SpeedFest 10	(Italy) Gianmarco Ercoli	(Netherlands) Liam Hezemans	(Italy) Gianmarco Ercoli	(Italy) Gianmarco Ercoli	(Italy) CAAL Racing	Chevrolet
3	R5	American Festival of Rome	(Italy) Gianmarco Ercoli	(France) Paul Jouffreau	(Italy) Gianmarco Ercoli	(Italy) Gianmarco Ercoli	(Italy) CAAL Racing	Chevrolet
3	R6	American Festival of Rome	(France) Paul Jouffreau	(Italy) Gianmarco Ercoli	(Italy) Vittorio Ghirelli	(Italy) Vittorio Ghirelli	(Netherlands) Team Bleekemolen	Toyota
4	R7	Autodrom Most NASCAR Show	(Italy) Vittorio Ghirelli	(Italy) Vittorio Ghirelli	(Italy) Vittorio Ghirelli	(Italy) Vittorio Ghirelli	(Netherlands) Team Bleekemolen	Toyota
4	R8	Autodrom Most NASCAR Show	(Italy) Vittorio Ghirelli	(Netherlands) Liam Hezemans	(France) Paul Jouffreau	(France) Paul Jouffreau	(France) RDV Competition	Ford
5	R9	NASCAR GP Germany	(Germany) Tobias Dauenhauer	(Germany) Tobias Dauenhauer	(Italy) Vittorio Ghirelli	(France) Paul Jouffreau (Note: Vittorio Ghirelli originally won the race, but he was stripped of the win after receiving a 3-place position drop penalty post-race for usage of a non-compliant air filter.)	(France) RDV Competition	Ford
5	R10	NASCAR GP Germany	(Germany) Tobias Dauenhauer	(Netherlands) Liam Hezemans	(Germany) Tobias Dauenhauer	(Germany) Tobias Dauenhauer	(Germany) Bremotion	Chevrolet
6	R11	NASCAR GP Belgium	(France) Paul Jouffreau	(France) Lucas Lasserre	(France) Paul Jouffreau	(France) Lucas Lasserre	(France) SpeedHouse Racing	Ford
6	R12	NASCAR GP Belgium	(France) Lucas Lasserre	(Germany) Tobias Dauenhauer	(Germany) Tobias Dauenhauer	(Germany) Tobias Dauenhauer	(Germany) Bremotion	Chevrolet

=== EuroNASCAR 2 ===
Round		Race	Pole position	Fastest lap	Most laps led	Winning driver	Winning team	Winning manufacturer
1	R1	Valencia NASCAR Fest	(Cyprus) Vladimiros Tziortzis	(Cyprus) Vladimiros Tziortzis	(Cyprus) Vladimiros Tziortzis	(Cyprus) Vladimiros Tziortzis	(Italy) Academy Motorsport	EuroNASCAR FJ
1	R2	Valencia NASCAR Fest	(Cyprus) Vladimiros Tziortzis	(Cyprus) Vladimiros Tziortzis	(Cyprus) Vladimiros Tziortzis	(Cyprus) Vladimiros Tziortzis	(Italy) Academy Motorsport	EuroNASCAR FJ
2	R3	American SpeedFest 10	(Italy) Alberto "Naska" Fontana	(Cyprus) Vladimiros Tziortzis	(Cyprus) Vladimiros Tziortzis	(Cyprus) Vladimiros Tziortzis	(Italy) Academy Motorsport	EuroNASCAR FJ
2	R4	American SpeedFest 10	(Cyprus) Vladimiros Tziortzis	(Cyprus) Vladimiros Tziortzis	(France) Paul Jouffreau	(Cyprus) Vladimiros Tziortzis	(Italy) Academy Motorsport	EuroNASCAR FJ
3	R5	American Festival of Rome	(France) Paul Jouffreau	(Italy) Alberto "Naska" Fontana	(Italy) Alberto "Naska" Fontana	(Italy) Alberto "Naska" Fontana	(Italy) CAAL Racing	Chevrolet
3	R6	American Festival of Rome	(Italy) Alberto "Naska" Fontana	(France) Paul Jouffreau	(France) Paul Jouffreau	(France) Paul Jouffreau	(France) RDV Competition	Ford
4	R7	Autodrom Most NASCAR Show	(Cyprus) Vladimiros Tziortzis	(Czech Republic) Martin Doubek	(Cyprus) Vladimiros Tziortzis	(Cyprus) Vladimiros Tziortzis	(Italy) Academy Motorsport	EuroNASCAR FJ
4	R8	Autodrom Most NASCAR Show	(Czech Republic) Martin Doubek	(Italy) Alberto "Naska" Fontana	(Italy) Alberto "Naska" Fontana	(Italy) Alberto "Naska" Fontana	(Italy) CAAL Racing	Chevrolet
5	R9	NASCAR GP Germany	(France) Paul Jouffreau	(Italy) Alberto "Naska" Fontana	(France) Paul Jouffreau	(France) Paul Jouffreau	(France) RDV Competition	Ford
5	R10	NASCAR GP Germany	(Italy) Alberto "Naska" Fontana	(Cyprus) Vladimiros Tziortzis	(Austria) Patrick Schober	(Austria) Patrick Schober	(Italy) Double V Racing	Ford
6	R11	NASCAR GP Belgium	(France) Paul Jouffreau	(France) Paul Jouffreau	(France) Paul Jouffreau	(Luxembourg) Gil Linster (Note: Paul Jouffreau originally won the race, but he was stripped of the win after receiving a 30-second time penalty for causing an avoidable collision with Alberto Naska.)	(Netherlands) Hendriks Motorsport	Toyota
6	R12	NASCAR GP Belgium	(France) Paul Jouffreau	(France) Paul Jouffreau	(France) Paul Jouffreau	(France) Paul Jouffreau	(France) RDV Competition	Ford

== Standings ==
Points are awarded to drivers and team using the current point system used in NASCAR Cup Series, NASCAR Xfinity Series, and NASCAR Camping World Truck Series, excluding the Stage and Race Winner bonus points. For the final round at Zolder, double points are awarded. In addition, the driver that gained the most positions in a race will receive 4 bonus championship points.

For the EuroNASCAR PRO and EuroNASCAR 2 driver's championship, only the best 8 results from the first 10 races and the results from the double-points rewarding final round at Zolder will count towards the final standings. For the Club Challenge championships, points are awarded per session and the results listed from each round in the standings are the combined results. For the Teams Championship, all points scored by a team's drivers will be counted with no dropped scores.

=== EuroNASCAR PRO ===
(key) Bold - Pole position awarded by fastest qualifying time (in Race 1) or by previous race's fastest lap (in Race 2). Italics - Fastest lap. * – Most laps led. ^ – Most positions gained.

Pos	Driver	(Spain) ESP		(United Kingdom) GBR		(Italy) ITA		(Czech Republic) CZE		(Germany) GER		(Belgium) BEL		Points
1	(Italy) Gianmarco Ercoli	3	(**14**)*	**1***	**1***	**1***	2	(15)	5	5	5	10	4^	413 (458)
2	(France) Lucas Lasserre	6	1	8	4	4	3	4	6	(17)	(22)	1	**10**	398 (433)
3	(Italy) Vittorio Ghirelli	4	(16)	2	(14)	5	1*	**1***	**2**	4*	4	6	13	391 (435)
4	(Belgium) Anthony Kumpen	7	4	4	2	(12)	6	2	(12)	6	3	5	6	388 (438)
5	(Netherlands) Liam Hezemans	1*	(24)	3	(22)	2	16	14	3	7	6	8^	2	384 (412)
6	(Germany) Tobias Dauenhauer			7	18	10	10	20	4^	**2**	**1***	4	1*	378
7	(France) Ulysse Delsaux	11	6	(12)	10	6	7	6	9	8	(11)	9	9	345 (396)
8	(Czech Republic) Martin Doubek	12	2^	(21)	5	11	11	5	17	(20)	12^	11	7	341 (374)
9	(France) Paul Jouffreau					3	**5**	16	1*	1	2	**2***	8	330
10	(Switzerland) Giorgio Maggi	10	7	6	15	22	18	(DNS)^{2}	(DNS)^{2}	19	8	3	5	323 (337)
11	(Cyprus) Vladimiros Tziortzis	**2**	13	(25)	8^	7	4	3	8	(22)	17	13	20	322 (347)
12	(Netherlands) Sebastiaan Bleekemolen	5	(26)	5	3	13	(DNS)^{2}	18	18	9	9	7	21	310 (328)
13	(Italy) Fabrizio Armetta	14	15	9	6	14	(20)	17	7	18	(20)	14	3	310 (344)
14	(Greece) Thomas Krasonis	13	8	14	12	(15)	12	7	10	(14)	13	16	17	289 (334)
15	(Switzerland) Thomas Toffel	19^	25	15	16	(28)	(DNS)^{2}	8	19	11	15	12	15	266 (282)
16	(Belgium) Marc Goossens	8	3	11	11	8	10			3	7	DNS^{3}	DNS^{4}	262
17	(Italy) Riccardo Romagnoli	(26)	9	24	7	21	(DNS)^{2}	9	14	15^	18	19	16	261 (279)
18	(Italy) Dario Caso	18	21			24	21	11	15	21	21	20	18	204
19	(France) Thomas Dombrowski	27	19	16^	17					13	14	18	14	204
20	(Italy) Max Lanza	15	(28)	17	21	(25)	13^	12	13	16	19			174 (193)
21	(France) Néo Lambert	25	11	13	9	18	DNS^{2}	19	11					160
22	(United States) Ryan Vargas									10	10	15	11	150
23	(Ukraine) Yevgen Sokolovskiy			18	24							17	12	122
24	(India) Advait Deodhar	16	10	22	13	27	DNS^{2}							104
25	(Finland) Tuomas Pöntinen					9	8			12	16			103
26	(France) Frédéric Gabillon	9	5	10	23									101
27	(Austria) Alina Loibnegger	22	17	23	19	17^	DNS^{2}							98
28	(Italy) Simone Laureti	21	22			16	14							75
29	(Slovakia) Michaela Dorcikova	23	20					13	20					72
30	(Italy) Stefano Attianese	24	18	19	DNS^{1}	26	DNS^{2}							71
31	(Italy) Mario Ercoli											21	19	68
32	(United Kingdom) Jack Davidson							10	16					48
33	(Japan) Kenko Miura	17	12											45
34	(France) Yannick Panagiotis					19	15							40
35	(Italy) Cesare Balistreri					21	19							35
36	(France) Hugo Fleury					23	17							34
37	(United Kingdom) Matthew Ellis			20	20									34
38	(Portugal) Miguel Gomes	20	23											31
39	(Switzerland) Christoph Lenz	DNS	27											10

Notes

- ^{1} – Stefano Attianese received 3 championship points despite being a non-starter.
- ^{2} – Sebastiaan Bleekemolen, Néo Lambert, Riccardo Romagnoli, Advait Deodhar, Alina Loibnegger, Thomas Toffel, Stefano Attianese, and Giorgio Maggi received 7 championship points despite being a non-starter.
- ^{3} – Marc Goossens received 12 championship points despite being a non-starter.
- ^{4} – Marc Goossens received 14 championship points despite being a non-starter.

=== EuroNASCAR 2 ===
(key) Bold - Pole position awarded by fastest qualifying time (in Race 1) or by previous race's fastest lap (in Race 2). Italics - Fastest lap. * – Most laps led. ^ – Most positions gained.

Pos	Driver	(Spain) ESP		(United Kingdom) GBR		(Italy) ITA		(Czech Republic) CZE		(Germany) GER		(Belgium) BEL		Points
1	(France) Paul Jouffreau	3	3	(5)	2*	**2**	1*	2	2	**1***	(4)	**7***	**1***	428 (493)
2	(Cyprus) Vladimiros Tziortzis	**1***	**1***	1*	**1**	4	3	**1***	(21)	(DNS)^{5}	12	4	4	424 (447)
3	(Luxembourg) Gil Linster	4	4	4	5	3	4	4	4	(18)	(7)	1	6	406 (455)
4	(Austria) Patrick Schober	6	5	18	(DNS)^{2}	5	7	3	(20)	5	1*	2	3	388 (411)
5	(Czech Republic) Martin Doubek	5	12	3	6	(22)	6	(13)	**3**	3	11	9	2	373 (412)
6	(Italy) Alberto "Naska" Fontana	2	2	**2**	3	1*	**2**	(14)	1*	2	(**15**)	18	19	371 (416)
7	(United Kingdom) Jack Davidson	11	9	(19)	7	(25)	12^	5	6	11	5	6	7	356 (377)
8	(Netherlands) Melvin de Groot			14	4	7	20	19	9	6	3	3	5	344
9	(France) Thomas Dombrowski	9	7	7^	11	8	5	6	(17)	8	(16)	20	8	335 (376)
10	(Italy) Claudio Remigio Cappelli	(21)	6	6	9	6	10	(18)	5	4	8	22	10	334 (369)
11	(Italy) Roberto Benedetti	8^	22	9	(DNS)^{2}	(23)	17	10	8	10	9	5	13	321 (347)
12	(Netherlands) Michael Bleekemolen	14	15	(21)	10	10^	9	(16)	11	12	10	8	20	305 (342)
13	(Italy) Riccardo Romagnoli	7	10	8	8	(DNS)^{3}	(23)	21	10^	9	20	10	21	296 (314)
14	(Switzerland) Thomas Toffel	10	(21)	(20)	19	11	26^{6}	15	7	7	2	23^{7}	11^	260 (276)
15	(Germany) Matthias Hauer	22	20	15	16			12	23	17	19	16	16	244
16	(Italy) Arianna Casoli	19	17	17	(20)	16	16	17	16	(20)	18	19	18	242 (276)
17	(United States) Nick Strickler	17	19	12	12	21	18					12^	12	235
18	(France) Eric Quintal	18	18			17	15	DNS^{4}	19	19	17	17	17	232
19	(Italy) Paolo Valeri	16	23			9	11	20	13			14	22	210
20	(Belgium) Sven van Laere	(20)	16	13	(18)	15	14	11	14	14	14	DNS^{8}	DNS^{4}	209 (245)
21	(Brazil) Nick Schneider	12	13	(22)	14	12	8	7	(22)	15	21			194 (224)
22	(Italy) Mario Ercoli									16	13	13	14	143
23	(Australia) Max Mason	DNS^{1}	14^	DNS^{1}	13^	18	24							99
24	(Italy) Fabrizio Armetta	PO	PO									21	9	88
25	(Italy) Federico Monti											15	15	88
26	(Italy) Igor Sicuro			11	15	19	22							81
27	(Belgium) Eric de Doncker											11	23	80
28	(Italy) Valerio Marzi					24	25	8^	12					71
29	(Germany) Dominique Schaak									13^	6^			63
30	(Italy) Dario Caso	15	8											51
31	(Austria) Alina Loibnegger							9	15					50
32	(Japan) Kenko Miura	13	11											50
33	(France) Olivier Bec					14	13							47
34	(France) Victor Neumann			10	21									43
35	(France) Olivier Panagiotis					13	19							42
36	(United Kingdom) Gordon Barnes			16	17									41
37	(Croatia) Stefani Mogorović							22	18					34
38	(Italy) Cesare Balistreri					20	21							32

Notes

- ^{1} – Max Mason received 5 championship points despite being a non-starter.
- ^{2} – Patrick Schober and Roberto Benedetti received 6 championship points despite being a non-starter.
- ^{3} – Riccardo Romagnoli received 3 championship points despite being a non-starter.
- ^{4} – Eric Quintal and Sven van Laere received 8 championship points despite being a non-starter.
- ^{5} – Vladimiros Tziortzis received 7 championship points despite being a non-starter.
- ^{6} – Thomas Toffel's disqualification from Vallelunga is declared to be ineligible to be dropped from his final points tally.
- ^{7} – Thomas Toffel only received 10 points, equal to the results of a non-starter, despite having started the race.
- ^{8} – Sven van Laere received 16 championship points despite being a non-starter.

=== Team's Championship (Top 15) ===
Pos	No.	Team	Body Style	EuroNASCAR PRO Driver(s)	EuroNASCAR 2 Driver(s)	Points
1	3	(France) RDV Competition	Ford	(France) Frédéric Gabillon (France) Paul Jouffreau	(France) Paul Jouffreau	924
2	54	(Italy) CAAL Racing	Chevrolet	(Italy) Gianmarco Ercoli	(Italy) Alberto "Naska" Fontana	874
3	50	(Netherlands) Hendriks Motorsport	Toyota	(Netherlands) Liam Hezemans	(Luxembourg) Gil Linster	867
4	5	(Italy) Academy Motorsport	EuroNASCAR FJ	(Cyprus) Vladimiros Tziortzis	(Cyprus) Vladimiros Tziortzis	794
5	7	(Netherlands) Hendriks Motorsport	Ford	(Czech Republic) Martin Doubek	(Czech Republic) Martin Doubek	786
6	72	(Netherlands) Team Bleekemolen	Chevrolet 1 Toyota 5	(Italy) Vittorio Ghirelli	(Netherlands) Michael Bleekemolen	777
7	64	(France) SpeedHouse Racing	Ford	(France) Lucas Lasserre	(France) Eric Quintal (Italy) Igor Sicuro	713
8	18	(Switzerland) Race Art Technology	Ford	(Switzerland) Giorgio Maggi	(Italy) Claudio Remigio Cappelli	706
9	48	(Germany) Marko Stipp Motorsport	Chevrolet	(Portugal) Miguel Gomes (Ukraine) Yevgen Sokolovskiy (Finland) Tuomas Pöntinen (United Kingdom) Jack Davidson	(United Kingdom) Jack Davidson	681
10	69	(Netherlands) Team Bleekemolen	Ford	(Netherlands) Sebastiaan Bleekemolen	(Netherlands) Melvin de Groot	672
11	14	(France) SpeedHouse Racing	Ford	(France) Ulysse Delsaux	(Italy) Arianna Casoli	672
12	46	(Germany) Marko Stipp Motorsport	Chevrolet	(Greece) Thomas Krasonis	(Brazil) Nick Schneider (United States) Nick Strickler	670
13	99	(Germany) Bremotion	Chevrolet	(Germany) Tobias Dauenhauer	(United Kingdom) Gordon Barnes (Austria) Alina Loibnegger (Germany) Dominique Schaak (Belgium) Eric de Doncker	612
14	65	(Italy) The Club Motorsport	Chevrolet	(Italy) Riccardo Romagnoli	(Italy) Riccardo Romagnoli	593
15	34	(Switzerland) Race Art Technology	Chevrolet	(Switzerland) Thomas Toffel	(Switzerland) Thomas Toffel	581
Pos	No.	Team	Body Style	EuroNASCAR PRO Driver(s)	EuroNASCAR 2 Driver(s)	Points

== See also ==
- 2023 NASCAR Cup Series
- 2023 NASCAR Xfinity Series
- 2023 NASCAR Craftsman Truck Series
- 2023 ARCA Menards Series
- 2023 ARCA Menards Series East
- 2023 ARCA Menards Series West
- 2023 NASCAR Whelen Modified Tour
- 2023 NASCAR Pinty's Series
- 2023 NASCAR Mexico Series
- 2023 NASCAR Brasil Sprint Race
- 2023 SRX Series
- 2023 CARS Tour
- 2023 SMART Modified Tour
