= 2016 Trofeo Angelo Caffi =

2016 Trofeo Angelo Caffi
Previous:	none	Next:	2017
Main series: NASCAR Whelen Euro Series

The 2016 Trofeo Angelo Caffi was the first edition of the Trofeo Angelo Caffi run at the 2016 Bologna Motor Show. The event featured cars and teams from the NASCAR Whelen Euro Series duelling at a temporary racetrack. The event was won by Alberto Cola who had no previous experience in the car.

== Entry list ==
Manufacturer	Car	Team	No.	Race Driver
Chevrolet	Chevrolet SS	(Italy) CAAL Racing	44	(Italy) Alberto Cola
Chevrolet	Chevrolet SS	(Italy) CAAL Racing	56	(Italy) Carlo Forte
Ford	Ford Mustang	(Italy) Double T by MRT Nocentini	7	(Italy) Claudio Giudici
Ford	Ford Mustang	(Italy) Double T by MRT Nocentini	9	(Italy) Gianmarco Ercoli
Ford	Ford Mustang	(Italy) Double T by MRT Nocentini	39	(Italy) Sergio Sambataro
Ford	Ford Mustang	(Italy) Double T by MRT Nocentini	77	(Italy) Gianni Giudici
Ford	Ford Mustang	(Italy) Vict Motorsport	8	(Italy) Dario Caso
Ford	Ford Mustang	(Monaco) Alex Caffi Motorsports	23	(Italy) Michele Imberti

== Qualifying ==
Results:

Pos.	Driver	Time
1.	(Italy) Dario Caso	00:24.50
2.	(Italy) Alberto Cola	00:24.76
3.	(Italy) Gianmarco Ercoli	00:25.07
4.	(Italy) Carlo Forte	00:25.37
5.	(Italy) Claudio Giudici	00:25.60
6.	(Italy) Michele Imberti	00:25.76
7.	(Italy) Sergio Sambataro	00:26.07
8.	(Italy) Gianni Giudici	00:27.30

== Race ==
Quarterfinals
(Italy) Dario Caso	2
(Italy) Gianni Giudici	0
(Italy) Gianmarco Ercoli	2
(Italy) Michele Imberti	0
(Italy) Carlo Forte	2
(Italy) Claudio Giudici	0
(Italy) Alberto Cola	2
(Italy) Sergio Sambataro	0

Semifinals
(Italy) Gianmarco Ercoli	2
(Italy) Dario Caso	0
(Italy) Alberto Cola	2
(Italy) Carlo Forte	0

Final
(Italy) Alberto Cola	2
(Italy) Gianmarco Ercoli	0
