= Tziortzis =

Tziortzis is a surname. Notable people with the surname include:

- Stavros Tziortzis (born 1948), Greek-Cypriot hurdler
- Vladimiros Tziortzis (born 1997), Cypriot racing driver
