= 2017 Trofeo TCR Italy =

2017 Trofeo TCR Italy
Previous:	none	Next:	2018
Main series: TCR Italy Touring Car Championship; Related: Trofeo Angelo Caffi

The 2017 Trofeo TCR Italy was the inaugural edition of the Trofeo TCR Italy run at the 2017 Bologna Motor Show. The event featured cars and teams from the TCR Italy Touring Car Championship duelling at a temporary racetrack. The event was won by Giacomo Altoè.

== Entry list ==
Team	Car	No.	Race Driver
Pit Lane Competizioni	SEAT León TCR	1	(Italy) Giacomo Altoè
Pit Lane Competizioni	Volkswagen Golf GTI TCR	2	(Italy) Giovanni Altoè
	SEAT León TCR	3	(Italy) Cosimo Barberini
Gruppo Piloti Forlivesi	SEAT León TCR	4	(Italy) Kevin Giacon
Gruppo Piloti Forlivesi	SEAT León TCR	5	(Italy) Alessandro Mazzolini
	SEAT León TCR	6	(Italy) Romy Dall’Antonia
Gruppo Piloti Forlivesi	SEAT León TCR	7	(Italy) Jonathan Giacon
	Peugeot 308 Racing Cup	8	(Italy) Maurizio Possumato

== Race ==
Quarterfinals
(Italy) Giacomo Altoè	2
(Italy) Maurizio Possumato	0
(Italy) Giovanni Altoè	2
(Italy) Romy Dall’Antonia	0
(Italy) Cosimo Barberini	2
(Italy) Alessandro Mazzolini	0
(Italy) Jonathan Giacon	2
(Italy) Kevin Giacon	0

Semifinals
(Italy) Giacomo Altoè	2
(Italy) Giovanni Altoè	0
(Italy) Jonathan Giacon	2
(Italy) Cosimo Barberini	0

Final
(Italy) Giacomo Altoè	2
(Italy) Jonathan Giacon	0
