= Eric De Doncker =

Belgian racing driver

Eric De Doncker (born 12 March 1962, in Brussels) is a Belgian racing driver. He won the (inaugural) GT4 European Cup in 2007 and again in 2008 with a Ford Mustang, and in 2008–2009 competed in the GT4 as well as the GT3 European Championship. He again competed in GT3 racing in 2009–10 (with a Ford GT) and 2010–11 (in a Mustang). He won the Group C Racing Series Championship 2016.

== Complete motorsports results ==
=== NASCAR ===
(key) (Bold – Pole position awarded by qualifying time. Italics – Pole position earned by points standings or practice time. * – Most laps led.)

==== Whelen Euro Series – Elite 1 ====
NASCAR Whelen Euro Series – Elite 1 results
Year	Team	No.	Make	1	2	3	4	5	6	7	8	9	10	11	12	NWES	Points
2015	Motorsport 98	98	Ford	VAL; 12	VAL; 14	VEN; 12	VEN; 13	BRH; 15	BRH; 11	TOU; 17	TOU; 19	UMB; 22	UMB; 24	ZOL; 12	ZOL; 13	15th	452
2016	Motorsport 98	98	Ford	VAL; 12	VAL; 11	VEN	VEN	BRH; 13	BRH; 12	TOU	TOU	ADR	ADR	ZOL; 11	ZOL; 12	20th	262
2017	Motorsport 98	98	Ford	VAL; 12	VAL; 23	BRH	BRH	VEN	VEN	HOC; 16	HOC; 24	FRA	FRA	ZOL	ZOL	30th	87

==== Whelen Euro Series – Elite 2 ====
NASCAR Whelen Euro Series – Elite 2 results
Year	Team	No.	Make	1	2	3	4	5	6	7	8	9	10	11	12	NWES	Points
2015	Motorsport 98	98	Ford	VAL; 7	VAL; 10	VEN; 11	VEN; 10	BRH; 6	BRH; 9	TOU; 14	TOU; 12	UMB; 17	UMB; 17	ZOL; 11	ZOL; 8	8th	537
2016	Motorsport 98	98	Ford	VAL; 8	VAL; 7	VEN	VEN	BRH; 6	BRH; 5	TOU	TOU	ADR	ADR	ZOL; 4	ZOL; 9	20th	300
2017	Motorsport 98	98	Ford	VAL; 5	VAL; 5	BRH	BRH	VEN	VEN	HOC; 22	HOC; 23	FRA	FRA	ZOL	ZOL	29th	105

=== 24 Hours of Le Mans results ===
Year	Class	No	Tyres	Car	Team	Co-Drivers	Laps	Pos.	Class Pos.
2010	GT1	61	**M**	Ford GT1; Ford 5.3L V8	(Belgium) Marc VDS Racing Team	(Belgium) Bas Leinders (Finland) Markus Palttala	26	DNF	DNF

=== Complete Le Mans Cup results ===
(key) (Races in bold indicate pole position; results in italics indicate fastest lap)

Year	Entrant	Class	Chassis	1	2	3	4	5	6	7	Rank	Points
2017	Motorsport 98	LMP3	Ligier JS P3	MNZ; 5	LMS; 1; 6	LMS; 2; 9	RBR; 4	LEC; Ret	SPA; 3	POR; 1	3rd	67
2018	Motorsport 98	LMP3	Ligier JS P3	LEC; 10	MNZ; 8	LMS; 1; 15	LMS; 2; 9	BAR; 7	SPA; 4	POR; 4	5th	36.5
2019	Motorsport98	LMP3	Ligier JS P3	LEC	MNZ	LMS; 1	LMS; 2	BAR; 5	SPA; 2	POR; 4	5th	40
2020	Motorsport98	LMP3	Ligier JS P320	RIC; 2	SPA; 6	LEC; Ret	LMS; 1	LMS; 2	MNZ; 5	POR; 8	8th	40
2021	Motorsport98	LMP3	Ligier JS P320	BAR; 12	LEC; 8	MNZ	LMS; 1; 19	LMS; 2 DNS	SPA; 7	POR	20th	11
2024	ANS Motorsport	LMP3	Ligier JS P320	BAR	LEC	LMS; 1	LMS; 2	SPA; 8	MUG; 22	ALG; Ret	28th	4
2025	Motorsport98	LMP3 Pro-Am	Ligier JS P325	BAR; 12	LEC; 2	LMS; 1; 3	LMS; 2; 4	SPA; 1	SIL; 8	ALG; 1	1st	88
2026	Motorsport98	LMP3 Pro-Am	Ligier JS P325	BAR; 6	LEC; 1	**LMS**; 1	SPA; 1	SIL; 4	POR; 4		1st	121

^{*} Season still in progress.

Sporting positions
Preceded by Eric De Doncker	GT4 European Cup champion 2007–2008	Succeeded by Joe Osborne
