= 2017 Trofeo Angelo Caffi =

2017 Trofeo Angelo Caffi
Previous:	2016	Next:	2018
Main series: NASCAR Whelen Euro Series; Related: Trofeo TCR Italy

The 2017 Trofeo Angelo Caffi was the second edition of the Trofeo Angelo Caffi run at the 2017 Bologna Motor Show. The event featured cars and teams from the NASCAR Whelen Euro Series duelling at a temporary racetrack. The event was won by Lorenzo Marcucci.

== Entry list ==
Manufacturer	Car	No.	Race Driver
Toyota	Toyota Camry	1	(Italy) Luca De Marchi
Toyota	Toyota Camry	2	(Italy) Marco Superti
Toyota	Toyota Camry	3	(Italy) Luciano Carcheri
Ford	Ford Mustang	4	(Italy) Marco Melandri
Ford	Ford Mustang	5	(Republic of Ireland) R. Hayes
Ford	Ford Mustang	6	(Switzerland) Francesco Parli
Ford	Ford Mustang	7	(Italy) Lorenzo Marcucci
Ford	Ford Mustang	8	(Italy) Massimiliano Lanza

== Race ==
Quarterfinals
(Italy) Marco Melandri	2
(Italy) Luciano Carcheri	0
(Italy) Massimiliano Lanza	1
(Italy) Luca De Marchi	1
(Italy) Marco Superti	1
(Switzerland) Francesco Parli	0
(Italy) Lorenzo Marcucci	2
(Republic of Ireland) R. Hayes	0

Semifinals
(Italy) Marco Melandri	2
(Italy) Massimilano Lanza	0
(Italy) Lorenzo Marcucci	1
(Italy) Marco Superti	0

Final
(Italy) Lorenzo Marcucci	2
(Italy) Marco Melandri	0
