= Vladimiros Tziortzis =

Cypriot auto racing driver (born 1997)

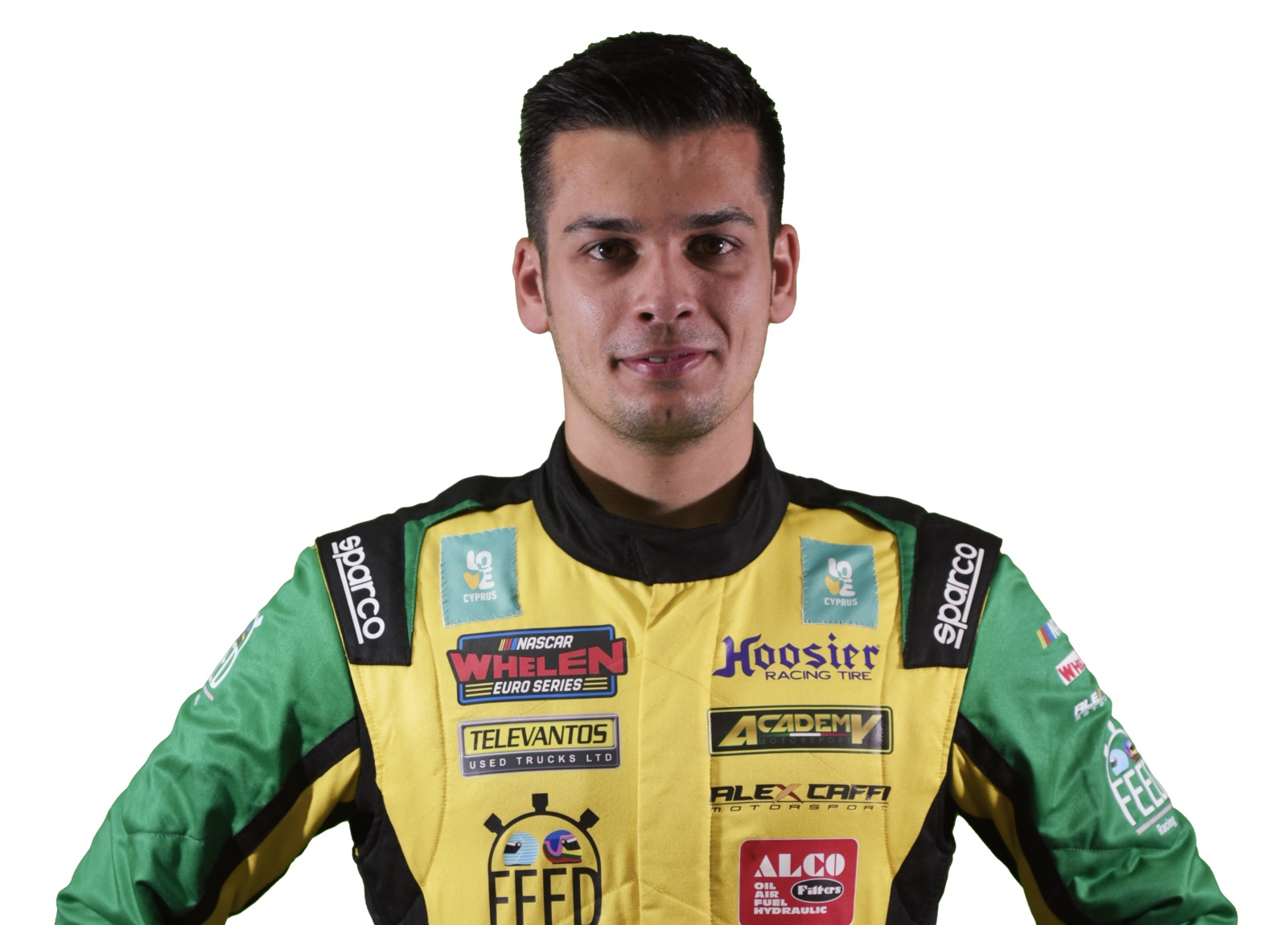
- Tziortzis in 2022
- Nationality: Cypriot
- Born: 6 April 1997 (age 29) Nicosia, Cyprus

NASCAR Whelen Euro Series career
- Debut season: 2020
- Current team: SpeedHouse Racing
- Car number: 64
- Former teams: Academy Motorsports
- Starts: 33
- Championships: 0
- Wins: 8
- Poles: 16
- Fastest laps: 16
- Best finish: 1st in 2023
- Finished last season: 2nd in 2023

Previous series
- 2018 2016–2017: Formula Renault Eurocup; SMP F4 Championship

Championship titles
- 2007-2014: 7x Cyprus Karting Champion

Awards
- 2020,2022,2023: Cyprus Motorsport Award

Vladimiros Tziortzis (born 6 April 1997) is a Cypriot professional racing driver who last competed in the NASCAR Euro Series, driving the No. 64 for SpeedHouse Racing in the PRO class. He previously competed in Formula Renault Eurocup and SMP F4 Championship before making the switch to stock car racing in 2020.

== Racing career ==
At the age of five, Tziortzis took his first driving lessons from his father in the parking lot of GSP Stadium. He began his career on karting a few months later and won the Pancyprian Karting Championship in different classes for seven consecutive years. He also represented Cyprus in the International ROK Cup Finals for three years, scoring a best result of 13th in 2008.

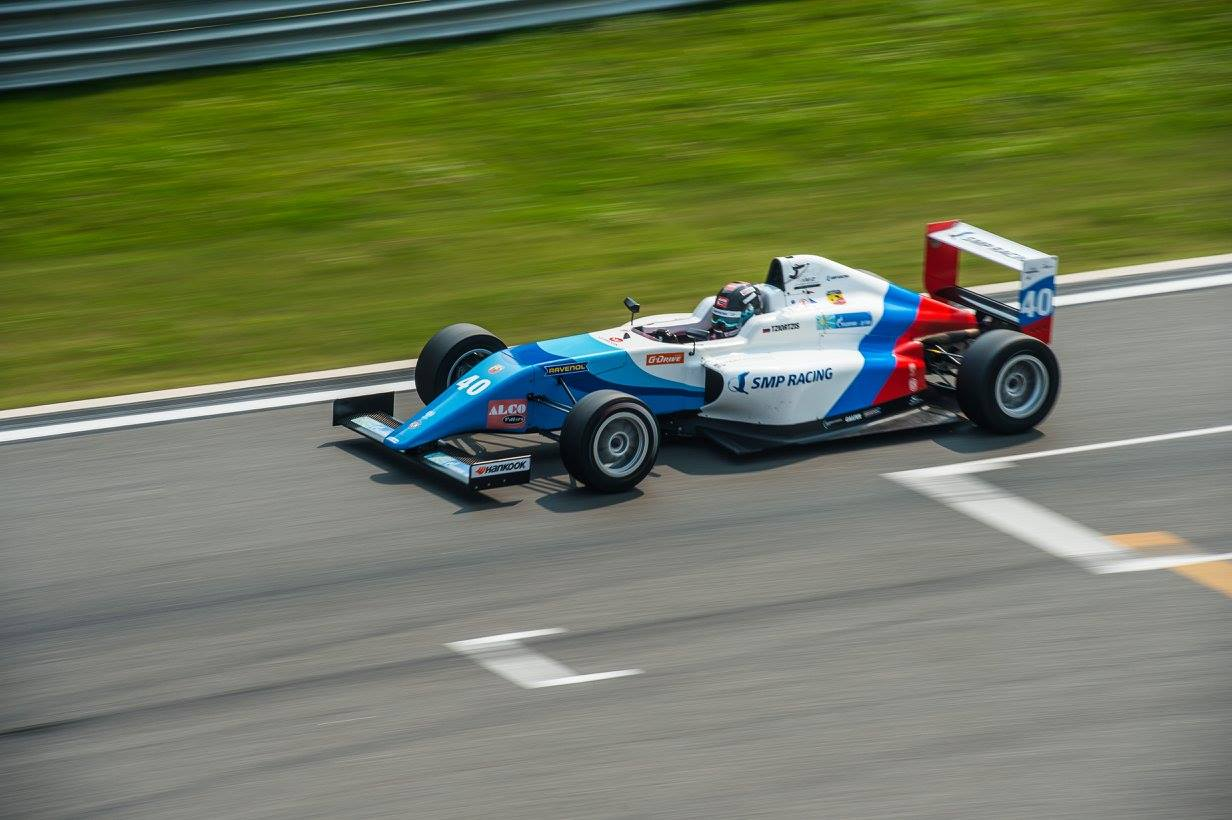
Tziortzis driving for SMP Racing in 2016.

After receiving an opportunity to test a Formula Renault 2.0 and Euroformula Open Championship car in 2014, Tziortzis made his racing career debut in the Formula Masters Russia championship in 2015 before he moved to SMP F4 Championship on the following year. He finished his first season in thirteenth place, scoring a best finishing result of two sixth places in Moscow. Tziortzis continued to race in SMP F4 for the following season and went on to finish 10th in the standings with a best result of two third-place finishes and one second-place finish, all of which were achieved in the second round at Moscow.

In 2018, Tziortzis made the move to Formula Renault Eurocup after he was signed by Fortec Motorsports. In 2019, he took part in the official Formula Renault Eurocup post-season tests at Yas Marina and Paul Ricard, driving for JD Motorsport.

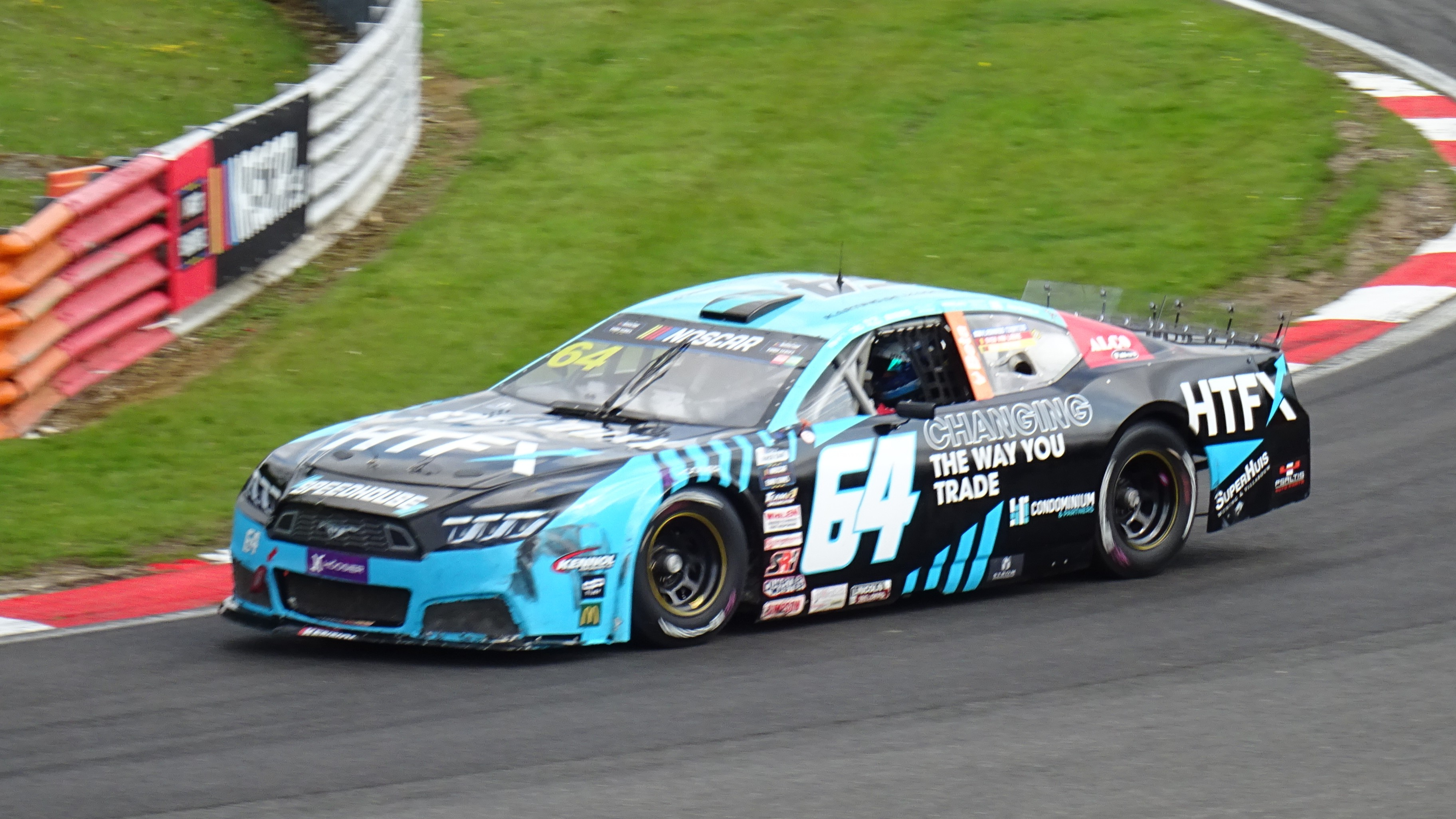
Tziortzis at Brands Hatch in 2025

Tziortzis made the switch to stock car racing in 2020 after he was signed by NASCAR Whelen Euro Series team Alex Caffi Motorsport to drive the No. 1 Ford Mustang the EuroNASCAR 2 class, becoming the first Cypriot driver to compete in NASCAR. Tziortzis impressed in his debut season, scoring two podiums and eight top-ten finishes with a best finish of second in the third race at Valencia. He finished the year fourth in the standings with 365 points, 54 points behind champion Vittorio Ghirelli. His success allowed Alex Caffi Motorsport, which undergo a rebrand to Academy Motorsport in the off-season, to resign Tziortzis for 2021. Tziortzis scored five podium finishes on his way to finish sixth in the standings that year. He also scored a pole position in the NASCAR GP Belgium at Circuit Zolder, his maiden pole result in the NASCAR Whelen Euro Series.

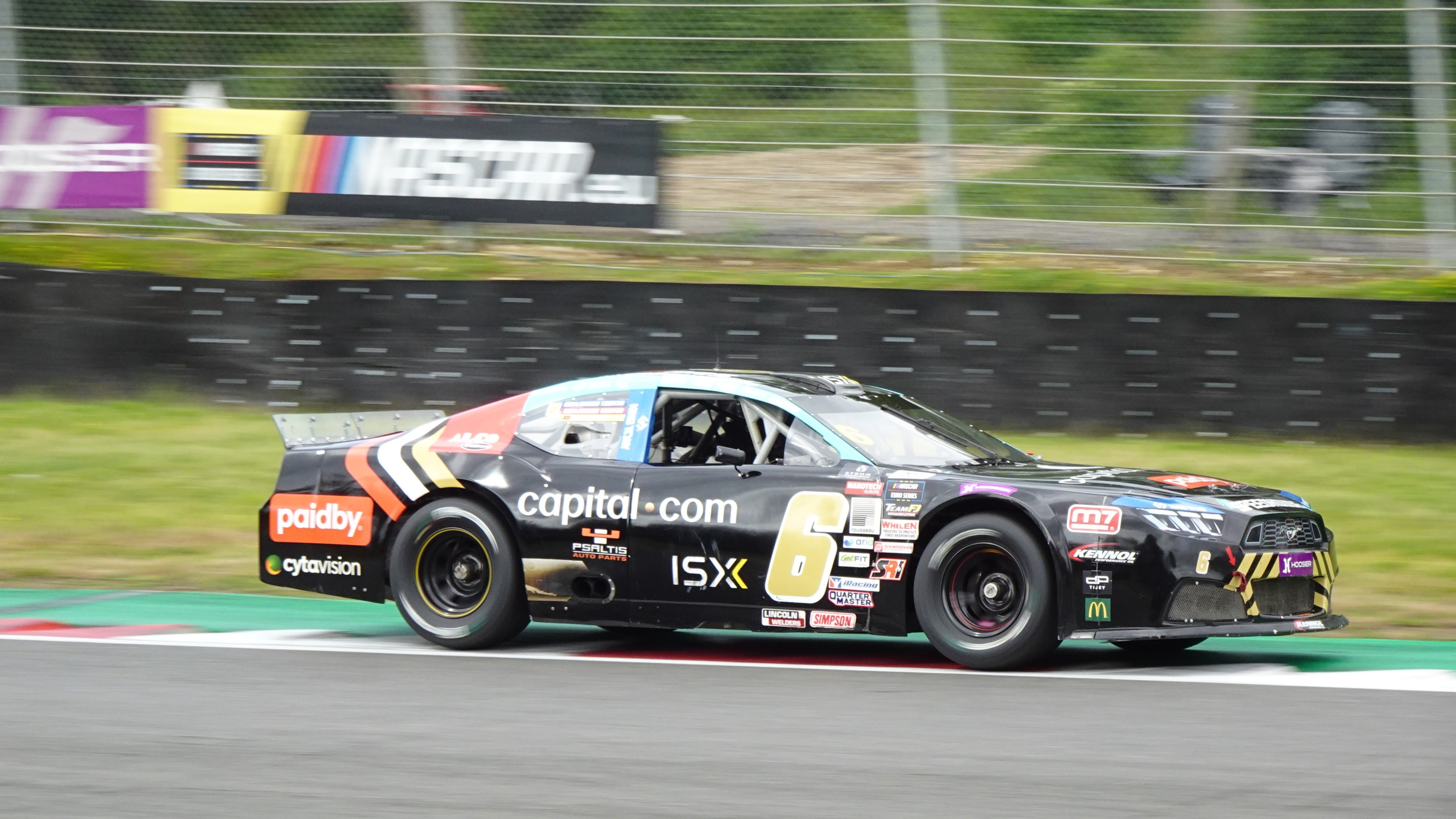
Tzrioztzis at Brands Hatch in 2026

For the 2022 season, Tziortzis renewed his contract with Academy Motorsport as he was transferred from the No. 1 car to the team's No. 5 car, acting as the teammate for Patrick Lemarié. Tziortzis finished third in the overall standings, having won the season opening race at Valencia and scored a total of seven podium finishes.

On 14 December 2022, it was announced that Tziortzis would be moving up to the EuroNASCAR PRO division for the 2023 season. Tziortzis would continue to drive Academy Motorsport's No. 5 car for his debut season in EuroNASCAR PRO.

== Racing record ==
=== Career summary ===
Season	Series	Team	Races	Wins	Poles	F/Laps	Podiums	Points	Position
2016	SMP F4 Championship	SMP Racing	20	0	0	0	0	32	13th
2017	SMP F4 Championship	SMP Racing	21	0	0	0	3	76	10th
2018	Formula Renault Eurocup	Fortec Motorsport	18	0	0	0	0	0	27th
2018	Formula Renault Northern European Cup	Fortec Motorsport	6	0	0	0	0	0	NC†
2020	NASCAR Whelen Euro Series – EuroNASCAR 2	Alex Caffi Motorsport	10	0	0	0	2	365	4th
2021	NASCAR Whelen Euro Series – EuroNASCAR 2	Academy Motorsport	12	0	1	0	5	360	6th
2022	NASCAR Whelen Euro Series – EuroNASCAR 2	Academy Motorsport	11	1	7	5	7	388	**3rd**
2023	NASCAR Whelen Euro Series – EuroNASCAR PRO	Academy Motorsport	12	0	1	0	2	322	11th
2023	NASCAR Whelen Euro Series – EuroNASCAR 2	Academy Motorsport	11	5	4	4	6	424	**2nd**
2024	NASCAR Whelen Euro Series – EuroNASCAR PRO	Academy Motorsport	13	0	0	0	0	391	12th
2025	NASCAR Euro Series - PRO	SpeedHouse Racing	12	0	0	0	0	416	8th
2026	NASCAR Euro Series - V8GP	SpeedHouse Racing	12	0	0	0	0	395	11th
2026	NASCAR Euro Series - OPEN	SpeedHouse Racing							

=== Complete SMP F4 Championship results ===
(key) (Races in bold indicate pole position) (Races in italics indicate fastest lap)

Year	Team	1	2	3	4	5	6	7	8	9	10	11	12	13	14	15	16	17	18	19	20	21	Pos	Points
2016	SMP Racing	SOC; 1; 14	SOC; 2; 11	ZAN1; 1; 7	ZAN1; 2; 14	ZAN1; 3; 10	ZAN2; 1; 13	ZAN2; 2; 12	ZAN2; 3; 12	MSC1; 1; 13	MSC1; 2; 15	MSC1; 3; 13	MSC2; 1; 6	MSC2; 2; 6	MSC2; 3; 16	AND; 1 Ret	AND; 2; 7	AND; 3; 7	AHV; 1; 12	AHV; 2; 13	AHV; 3 Ret		13th	32
2017	SMP Racing	SOC; 1 Ret	SOC; 2; 4	SOC; 3; 16	SMO; 1; 6	SMO; 2 Ret	SMO; 3; 9	AHV; 1; 16	AHV; 2; 9	AHV; 3; 10	AUD; 1; 7	AUD; 2; 4	AUD; 3; 12	MSC1; 1; 14	MSC1; 2; 11	MSC1; 3; 14	MSC2; 1; 3	MSC2; 2; 3	MSC2; 3; 2	ASS; 1 Ret	ASS; 2; 10	ASS; 3; 11	10th	76

=== Complete Formula Renault Eurocup results ===
(key) (Races in bold indicate pole position) (Races in italics indicate fastest lap)

Year	Team	1	2	3	4	5	6	7	8	9	10	11	12	13	14	15	16	17	18	19	20	Pos	Points
2018	Fortec Motorsport	LEC; 1; 21	LEC; 2; 19	MNZ; 1; 25	MNZ; 2 Ret	SIL; 1; 21	SIL; 2; 18	MON; 1; 24	MON; 2; 21	RBR; 1; 22	RBR; 2; 22	SPA; 1; 20	SPA; 2; 19	HUN; 1 Ret	HUN; 2; 16	NÜR; 1	NÜR; 2	HOC; 1; 18	HOC; 2; 18	CAT; 1; 13	CAT; 2; 21	27th	0

=== Complete Formula Renault NEC results ===
(key) (Races in bold indicate pole position) (Races in italics indicate fastest lap)

Year	Entrant	1	2	3	4	5	6	7	8	9	10	11	12	DC	Points
2018	Fortec Motorsport	PAU; 1	PAU; 2	MNZ; 1	MNZ; 2	SPA; 1; 20	SPA; 2; 19	HUN; 1 Ret	HUN; 2; 16	NÜR; 1	NÜR; 2	HOC; 1; 18	HOC; 2; 18	NC†	0

† As Tziortzis was a guest driver, he was ineligible for points

=== Complete NASCAR results ===
Whelen Euro Series - EuroNASCAR Pro

NASCAR Whelen Euro Series - EuroNASCAR Pro results
Year	Team	No.	Make	1	2	3	4	5	6	7	8	9	10	11	12	13	NWES	Pts
2023	Academy Motorsport	5	EuroNASCAR FJ	ESP; 2	ESP; 13	GBR; 25	GBR; 8	ITA; 8	ITA; 4	CZE; 3	CZE; 8	DEU; 22	DEU; 17	BEL; 13	BEL; 20		11th	322
2024	Academy Motorsport	1	Ford	ESP; 9	ESP; 22												12th	391
2024	Academy Motorsport	5	Ford			ITA; 10	ITA; 25	GBR; 9	GBR; 20	NED; 12	CZE; 11	CZE; 8	DEU; 20	DEU; 11	BEL; 16	BEL; 7	12th	391

==== Whelen Euro Series - EuroNASCAR 2 ====
(key) Bold - Pole position awarded by fastest qualifying time (in Race 1) or by previous race's fastest lap (in Race 2). Italics - Fastest lap. * – Most laps led. ^ – Most positions gained.)

NASCAR Whelen Euro Series - EuroNASCAR 2 results
Year	Team	No.	Make	1	2	3	4	5	6	7	8	9	10	11	12	NWES	Pts
2020	Alex Caffi Motorsport	1	Ford	ITA; 8	ITA; 7	BEL; 9	BEL; 10	CRO; 15	CRO; 4	ESP1; 5	ESP1; 15	ESP2; 2	ESP2; 3			4th	365
2021	Academy Motorsport	1	Ford	ESP; 2	ESP; 3	GBR; 9	GBR; 5	CZE; 20	CZE; 3^	CRO; 2	CRO; 4	**BEL**; 5	BEL; 2	ITA; 15	ITA; 18	6th	360
2022	Academy Motorsport	5	EuroNASCAR FJ	**ESP**; 1*	**ESP**; 11*	**GBR**; 2*	**GBR**; 3*	ITA; 2	**ITA**; 26	CZE; 3	CZE; 3	BEL; 25	BEL; DNS	**CRO**; 3	**CRO**; 2	3rd	388
2023	Academy Motorsport	5	EuroNASCAR FJ	**ESP**; 1*	**ESP**; 1*	**GBR**; 1*	**GBR**; 1	ITA; 4	ITA; 3	**CZE**; 1*	CZE; 21	DEU; DNS	DEU; 12	BEL; 4	BEL; 4	2nd	424
