= 2017 NASCAR Whelen Euro Series =

Locations of the European racing circuits

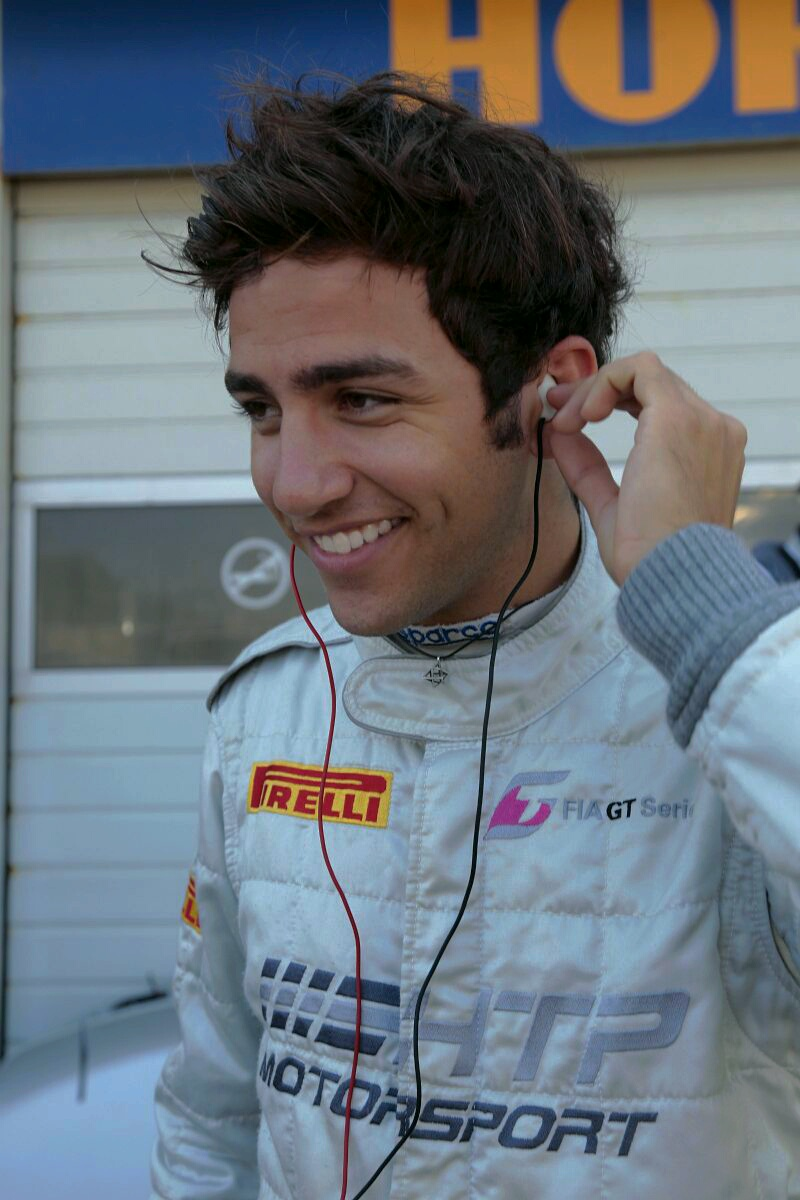
Alon Day (pictured in 2013) won his first Euro Series title in 2017.

The 2017 NASCAR Whelen Euro Series was the ninth Racecar Euro Series season, and the fifth under the NASCAR Whelen Euro Series branding. Anthony Kumpen entered the season as the defending champion in the Elite 1 class. Stienes Longin entered the season as the defending Elite 2 champion, but did not defend his title as he moved up to the Elite 1 class.

In the Elite 1 class, Alon Day won his first Elite 1 title, winning the championship by 53 points over Anthony Kumpen. In the Elite 2 class, Thomas Ferrando won his first Elite 2 title, finishing ahead of PK Carsport's Guillaume Dumarey by 91 points. Knauf Racing, represented by the No. 37 team, won their first (and only) team's championship title.

The season also included one non-championship event, the Trofeo Angelo Caffi, which was held at a temporary track that were laid down for the 2017 Bologna Motor Show and was won by Lorenzo Marcucci.

== Teams and drivers ==
=== Elite 1 Division ===
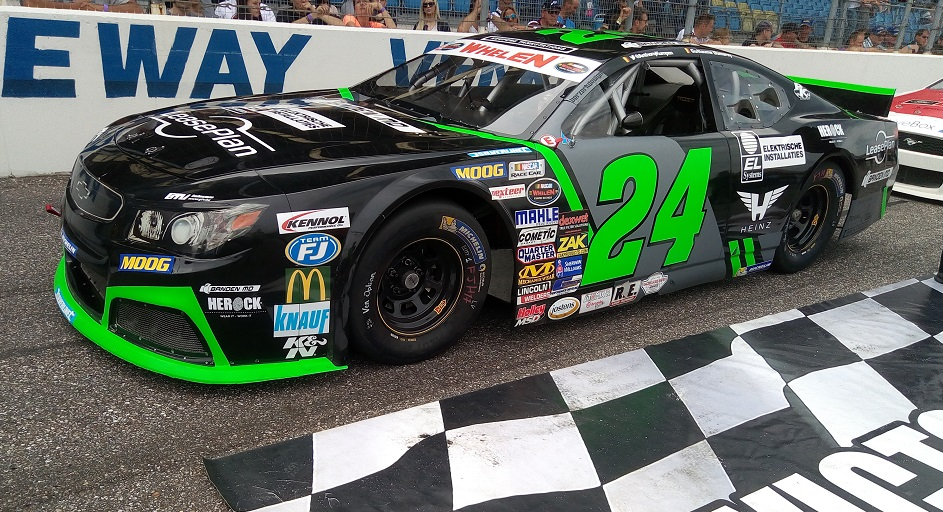
The car of Elite 1 title defender Anthony Kumpen in 2017.

Manufacturer	Car	Team	No.	Race Driver	Rounds
Chevrolet	Chevrolet SS	(Belgium) PK Carsport	11	(Belgium) Stienes Longin	All
Chevrolet	Chevrolet SS	(Belgium) PK Carsport	24	(Belgium) Anthony Kumpen	All
Chevrolet	Chevrolet SS	(Germany) Mishumotors	33	(Germany) Mirco Schultis	1
Chevrolet	Chevrolet SS	(Germany) Mishumotors	33	(Brazil) Bruno Junqueira	2
Chevrolet	Chevrolet SS	(Germany) Mishumotors	33	(Germany) Dominik Farnbacher	4
Chevrolet	Chevrolet SS	(Germany) Mishumotors	33	(France) Lucas Lasserre	5–6
Chevrolet	Chevrolet SS	(Germany) Mishumotors	70	(Germany) Patrick Simon	1, 4
Chevrolet	Chevrolet SS	(Germany) Mishumotors	70	(United Kingdom) Alex Kapadia	2
Chevrolet	Chevrolet SS	(Germany) Mishumotors	70	(Germany) Mirco Schultis	5–6 (Note: Mirco Schultis competed in the Saturday race at Zolder, while Nicki Petersen competed in the Sunday race.)
Chevrolet	Chevrolet SS	(Germany) Mishumotors	70	(Denmark) Nicki Petersen	5–6
Chevrolet	Chevrolet SS	(Italy) CAAL Racing	44	(Sweden) Freddy Nordström	All
Chevrolet	Chevrolet SS	(Italy) CAAL Racing	54	(Israel) Alon Day	All
Chevrolet	Chevrolet SS	(Italy) CAAL Racing	56	(Spain) Salvador Tineo Arroyo	All
Chevrolet	Chevrolet SS	(Germany) Racing-Total	46	(Germany) Marko Stipp	2–4, 6
Chevrolet	Chevrolet SS	(Austria) DF1 Racing	66	(France) Christophe Bouchut	1–5
Ford	Ford Mustang	(Monaco) Alex Caffi Motorsport	1	(Spain) Borja García	1
Ford	Ford Mustang	(Monaco) Alex Caffi Motorsport	1	(United States) Bobby Labonte	2
Ford	Ford Mustang	(Monaco) Alex Caffi Motorsport	1	(Spain) Carmen Boix Gil	3
Ford	Ford Mustang	(Monaco) Alex Caffi Motorsport	1	(France) Eric Van de Vyver	4
Ford	Ford Mustang	(Monaco) Alex Caffi Motorsport	1	(Italy) Nicola Larini	5
Ford	Ford Mustang	(Monaco) Alex Caffi Motorsport	1	(Switzerland) Francesco Parli	6
Ford	Ford Mustang	(Monaco) Alex Caffi Motorsport	27	(France) Jean-Baptiste Simmenauer	4
Ford	Ford Mustang	(Monaco) Alex Caffi Motorsport	27	(France) Éric Hélary	6
Ford	Ford Mustang	(France) RDV Compétition	3	(France) Frédéric Gabillon	All
Ford	Ford Mustang	(France) RDV Compétition	28	(Iran) Meisam Taheri	6
Ford	Ford Mustang	(France) RDV Compétition	31	(France) Hugo Bec	5
Ford	Ford Mustang	(France) RDV Compétition	31	(France) Didier Bec	6
Ford	Ford Mustang	(Italy) Scuderia Giudici	4	(Italy) Claudio Giudici	1–2, 5
Ford	Ford Mustang	(Austria) Renauer Motorsport	5	(Czech Republic) Martin Doubek	1–2, 4, 6
Ford	Ford Mustang	(Italy) Racers Motorsport	7	(Italy) Alessandro Ciompi	1
Ford	Ford Mustang	(Italy) Racers Motorsport	7	(Spain) Borja García	2–6
Ford	Ford Mustang	(Italy) Racers Motorsport	8	(Italy) Dario Caso	All
Ford	Ford Mustang	(Italy) Racers Motorsport	9	(Italy) Gianmarco Ercoli	All
Ford	Ford Mustang	(Italy) MRT by Nocentini	12	(Italy) Renzo Calcinati	5
Ford	Ford Mustang	(France) Dog Racing	14	(Italy) Carlo Alberto Forte	1
Ford	Ford Mustang	(France) Dog Racing	77	(Iran) Meisam Taheri	2–5
Ford	Ford Mustang	(France) Dog Racing	95	(France) Lucas Lasserre	1, 4
Ford	Ford Mustang	(France) Knauf Racing	37	(France) Thomas Ferrando	All
Ford	Ford Mustang	(France) Knauf Racing	73	(France) Wilfried Boucenna	All
Ford	Ford Mustang	(Italy) The Club Motorsports	41	(Italy) Fabrizio Armetta	4–6
Ford	Ford Mustang	(Belgium) Braxx Racing	78	(Belgium) Jerry De Weerdt	1–3, 5–6
Ford	Ford Mustang	(Belgium) Braxx Racing	90	(Belgium) Marc Goossens	2–3, 5–6
Ford	Ford Mustang	(Belgium) Motorsport 98	98	(Belgium) Eric De Doncker	1, 4
Toyota	Toyota Camry	(Monaco) Alex Caffi Motorsport	2	(Venezuela) Rodolfo González	1–2
Toyota	Toyota Camry	(Monaco) Alex Caffi Motorsport	2	(Japan) Kenko Miura	3–4, 6 (Note: Carlo Alberto Forte competed in the Saturday race, while Kenko Miura competed in the Sunday race.)
Toyota	Toyota Camry	(Monaco) Alex Caffi Motorsport	2	(Italy) Carlo Alberto Forte	4–5
Toyota	Toyota Camry	RDV Compétition Brazil	47	(Brazil) Marconi Abreu	All

=== Elite 2 Division ===
Manufacturer	Car	Team	No.	Race Driver	Rounds
Chevrolet	Chevrolet SS	(Belgium) PK Carsport	11	(Germany) Justin Kunz	All
Chevrolet	Chevrolet SS	(Belgium) PK Carsport	24	(Belgium) Guillaume Dumarey	All
Chevrolet	Chevrolet SS	(Germany) Mishumotors	33	(Germany) Günther Deutsch	1
Chevrolet	Chevrolet SS	(Germany) Mishumotors	33	(United Kingdom) Roger Bromiley	2
Chevrolet	Chevrolet SS	(Germany) Mishumotors	33	(Denmark) Nicki Petersen	5–6
Chevrolet	Chevrolet SS	(Germany) Mishumotors	70	(Germany) Mirco Schultis	1–2, 4–6
Chevrolet	Chevrolet SS	(Italy) CAAL Racing	44	(Luxembourg) Gil Linster	All
Chevrolet	Chevrolet SS	(Italy) CAAL Racing	54	(Italy) Arianna Casoli	All
Chevrolet	Chevrolet SS	(Italy) CAAL Racing	56	(Brazil) Felipe Rabello	All
Chevrolet	Chevrolet SS	(Germany) Racing-Total	46	(Spain) Carmen Boix Gil	2
Chevrolet	Chevrolet SS	(Germany) Racing-Total	46	(Germany) Marko Stipp	3
Chevrolet	Chevrolet SS	(Germany) Racing-Total	46	(Denmark) Nicki Petersen	4
Chevrolet	Chevrolet SS	(Germany) Racing-Total	46	(Belgium) Guillaume Deflandre	6
Chevrolet	Chevrolet SS	(Austria) DF1 Racing	66	(Poland) Maciej Dreszer	1–5
Ford	Ford Mustang	(Monaco) Alex Caffi Motorsport	1	(Spain) Carmen Boix Gil	1, 3–6
Ford	Ford Mustang	(Monaco) Alex Caffi Motorsport	27	(France) Jean-Baptiste Simmenauer	4
Ford	Ford Mustang	(Monaco) Alex Caffi Motorsport	27	(France) Pierre-Yves Rosoux	6
Ford	Ford Mustang	(France) RDV Compétition	3	(France) Ulysse Delsaux	All
Ford	Ford Mustang	(France) RDV Compétition	28	(Iran) Meisam Taheri	6
Ford	Ford Mustang	(France) RDV Compétition	31	(France) Didier Bec	5
Ford	Ford Mustang	(France) RDV Compétition	31	(France) Hugo Bec	6
Ford	Ford Mustang	(Italy) Scuderia Giudici	4	(Italy) Andrea Perlini	1–2
Ford	Ford Mustang	(Italy) Scuderia Giudici	4	(Italy) Claudio Giudici	5
Ford	Ford Mustang	(Austria) Renauer Motorsport	5	(Czech Republic) Martin Doubek	1–2, 4, 6
Ford	Ford Mustang	(Italy) Racers Motorsport	7	(Italy) Simone Laureti	All
Ford	Ford Mustang	(Italy) Racers Motorsport	8	(Italy) Dario Caso	All
Ford	Ford Mustang	(Italy) Racers Motorsport	9	(Italy) Gianmarco Ercoli	1
Ford	Ford Mustang	(Italy) Racers Motorsport	9	(Italy) Marco Spinelli	5
Ford	Ford Mustang	(Italy) Racers Motorsport	9	(Poland) Maciej Dreszer	6
Ford	Ford Mustang	(Italy) MRT by Nocentini	12	(Italy) Renzo Calcinati	5
Ford	Ford Mustang	(France) Dog Racing	14	(France) Evan Pichard Arnaud	1
Ford	Ford Mustang	(France) Dog Racing	77	(Iran) Meisam Taheri	2–5
Ford	Ford Mustang	(France) Dog Racing	95	(Iran) Meisam Taheri	1
Ford	Ford Mustang	(France) Dog Racing	95	(France) Evan Pichard Arnaud	2, 4
Ford	Ford Mustang	(France) Knauf Racing	37	(France) Thomas Ferrando	All
Ford	Ford Mustang	(France) Knauf Racing	73	(France) Paul Guiod	All
Ford	Ford Mustang	(Italy) The Club Motorsports	41	(Italy) Roberto Benedetti	4–6
Ford	Ford Mustang	(Belgium) Braxx Racing	78	(Belgium) Jerry De Weerdt	1–3, 5–6
Ford	Ford Mustang	(Belgium) Motorsport 98	98	(Belgium) Eric De Doncker	1, 4
Toyota	Toyota Camry	(Monaco) Alex Caffi Motorsport	2	(Japan) Kenko Miura	1, 3–4, 6
Toyota	Toyota Camry	(Monaco) Alex Caffi Motorsport	2	(Japan) Yuya Sakamoto	2
Toyota	Toyota Camry	(Monaco) Alex Caffi Motorsport	2	(Italy) Denny Zardo	5
Toyota	Toyota Camry	RDV Compétition Brazil	47	(Brazil) Marconi Abreu	All

=== Elite Club Division ===
Manufacturer	Car	Team	No.	Race Driver	Rounds
Chevrolet	Chevrolet SS	(Austria) Gruber Racing	26	(Austria) Willy Gruber	1
Chevrolet	Chevrolet SS	(Austria) DF1 Racing	66	(Brazil) Deo Alves	1
Ford	Ford Mustang	(Monaco) Alex Caffi Motorsport	1	(France) Eric Muet	1
Ford	Ford Mustang	(Austria) Renauer Motorsport	5	(Austria) Andreas Kuchelbacher	1
Ford	Ford Mustang	(France) Dog Racing	14	(Brazil) Marcelo Silva	1
Ford	Ford Mustang	(France) Dog Racing	95	(Brazil) Alfredo Cardoso	1
Ford	Ford Mustang	(France) RDV Compétition	31	(Switzerland) Yann Schar	1
Toyota	Toyota Camry	(Monaco) Alex Caffi Motorsport	2	(Italy) Luciano Carcheri	1

=== Team changes ===
- PK Carsports's Elite 1 driver Bert Longin left the series after three seasons to focus on his European Le Mans Series and Belcar campaigns. His seat was filled by his son Stienes who won the Elite 2 championship in 2016. In the Elite 2 class, Guillaume Dumarey joined the series.
- Brass Racing was forced to make a name change. As the name was EU registered by another company, the racing team is now called "Braxx Racing" for 2017.
- German endurance racing team Mishumotors made their NASCAR Euro Series debut in 2017.

== Schedule and results ==
=== Calendar changes ===
- Raceway Venray announced its date on October 25, switching from the Pinkster weekend (June 2 through 4th in 2017) to an entirely new date on 15th and 16 July, held in conjunction with the LMV8 Eurocup.
- Tours Speedway will not return to the schedule for 2017 after being a staple of the series for five consecutive seasons and the first oval the series visited.
- The series returns to Germany during the last weekend of July using the National Circuit at the Hockenheimring.
- Franciacorta has replaced Adria as the host for the Semi-Finals.

=== Elite 1 ===
Round		Race title	Track	Date	Pole position	Fastest lap	Winning driver	Winning manufacturer
1	R1	Valencia NASCAR Fest	(Spain) Circuit Ricardo Tormo, Cheste	8 April	(Spain) Borja García	(Spain) Borja García	(Spain) Borja García	Ford
1	R2	Valencia NASCAR Fest	(Spain) Circuit Ricardo Tormo, Cheste	9 April	(Spain) Borja García	(Spain) Borja García	(Spain) Borja García	Ford
2	R3	American SpeedFest	(United Kingdom) Brands Hatch (Indy), Swanley	10 June	(Belgium) Anthony Kumpen	(Belgium) Anthony Kumpen	(Belgium) Anthony Kumpen	Chevrolet
2	R4	American SpeedFest	(United Kingdom) Brands Hatch (Indy), Swanley	11 June	(Belgium) Anthony Kumpen	(France) Frédéric Gabillon	(Israel) Alon Day	Chevrolet
3	R5	Autospeedway American Style	(Netherlands) Raceway Venray, Venray	15 July	(Belgium) Anthony Kumpen	(Spain) Borja García	(Belgium) Anthony Kumpen	Chevrolet
3	R6	Autospeedway American Style	(Netherlands) Raceway Venray, Venray	16 July	(Spain) Borja García	(Spain) Borja García	(Spain) Borja García	Ford
4	R7	American Fan Fest	(Germany) Hockenheimring (National), Hockenheim	29 July	(Israel) Alon Day	(Israel) Alon Day	(Spain) Borja García	Ford
4	R8	American Fan Fest	(Germany) Hockenheimring (National), Hockenheim	30 July	(Israel) Alon Day	(Belgium) Anthony Kumpen	(Belgium) Anthony Kumpen	Chevrolet
5	R9	American NASCAR Weekend	(Italy) Autodromo di Franciacorta, Castrezzato	16 September	(France) Frédéric Gabillon	(Israel) Alon Day	(Israel) Alon Day	Chevrolet
5	R10	American NASCAR Weekend	(Italy) Autodromo di Franciacorta, Castrezzato	17 September	(Israel) Alon Day	(Israel) Alon Day	(Israel) Alon Day	Chevrolet
6	R11	American Festival NASCAR Finals	(Belgium) Circuit Zolder, Heusden-Zolder	14 October	(Israel) Alon Day	(Israel) Alon Day	(Israel) Alon Day	Chevrolet
6	R12	American Festival NASCAR Finals	(Belgium) Circuit Zolder, Heusden-Zolder	15 October	(Israel) Alon Day	(Belgium) Marc Goossens	(Belgium) Marc Goossens	Ford

Oval/Speedway
Road Course

=== Elite 2 ===
Round		Race title	Track	Date	Pole position	Fastest lap	Winning driver	Winning manufacturer
1	R1	Valencia NASCAR Fest	(Spain) Circuit Ricardo Tormo, Cheste	8 April	(France) Thomas Ferrando	(France) Thomas Ferrando	(France) Thomas Ferrando	Ford
1	R2	Valencia NASCAR Fest	(Spain) Circuit Ricardo Tormo, Cheste	9 April	(France) Thomas Ferrando	(France) Ulysse Delsaux	(France) Ulysse Delsaux	Ford
2	R3	American SpeedFest	(United Kingdom) Brands Hatch (Indy), Swanley	10 June	(Belgium) Guillaume Dumarey	(France) Thomas Ferrando	(France) Thomas Ferrando	Ford
2	R4	American SpeedFest	(United Kingdom) Brands Hatch (Indy), Swanley	11 June	(France) Thomas Ferrando	(France) Thomas Ferrando	(France) Thomas Ferrando	Ford
3	R5	Autospeedway American Style	(Netherlands) Raceway Venray, Venray	15 July	(Belgium) Guillaume Dumarey	(Brazil) Felipe Rabello	(Brazil) Felipe Rabello	Chevrolet
3	R6	Autospeedway American Style	(Netherlands) Raceway Venray, Venray	16 July	(Brazil) Felipe Rabello	(France) Ulysse Delsaux	(Brazil) Felipe Rabello	Chevrolet
4	R7	American Fan Fest	(Germany) Hockenheimring (National), Hockenheim	29 July	(France) Ulysse Delsaux	(Brazil) Felipe Rabello	(France) Thomas Ferrando	Ford
4	R8	American Fan Fest	(Germany) Hockenheimring (National), Hockenheim	30 July	(Brazil) Felipe Rabello	(France) Ulysse Delsaux	(France) Thomas Ferrando	Ford
5	R9	American NASCAR Weekend	(Italy) Autodromo di Franciacorta, Castrezzato	16 September	(France) Ulysse Delsaux	(Italy) Denny Zardo	(France) Thomas Ferrando	Ford
5	R10	American NASCAR Weekend	(Italy) Autodromo di Franciacorta, Castrezzato	17 September	(Italy) Denny Zardo	(France) Thomas Ferrando	(Italy) Denny Zardo	Toyota
6	R11	American Festival NASCAR Finals	(Belgium) Circuit Zolder, Heusden-Zolder	14 October	(France) Thomas Ferrando	(Belgium) Guillaume Dumarey	(France) Thomas Ferrando	Ford
6	R12	American Festival NASCAR Finals	(Belgium) Circuit Zolder, Heusden-Zolder	15 October	(Belgium) Guillaume Dumarey	(France) Thomas Ferrando	(France) Guillaume Deflandre	Chevrolet

Oval/Speedway
Road Course

== Standings ==
=== Elite 1 ===
(key) Bold - Pole position awarded by fastest qualifying time (in Race 1) or by previous race's fastest lap (in Race 2). Italics - Fastest lap. * – Most laps led.

Pos	Driver	(Spain) VAL		(United Kingdom) BRH		(Netherlands) VEN		(Germany) HOC		(Italy) FRA		(Belgium) ZOL		Points
1	(Israel) Alon Day	20	3	3	1*	3	5	**4**	**2**	1*	**1***	**1***	**4**	661
2	(Belgium) Anthony Kumpen	23	4	**1***	**7**	**1***	2	2	1*	6	16	3	3	609
3	(Spain) Borja García	**1***	**1***	2	9	2	**1***	1*	6	9	15	6	6	600
4	(France) Frédéric Gabillon	14	2	22	2	11	8	3	3	**2**	4	4	2	596
5	(Belgium) Stienes Longin	2	19	7	22	8	3	7	7	5	3	5	5	569
6	(Spain) Salvador Tineo Arroyo	2	19	7	22	8	3	7	7	5	3	5	5	557
7	(Italy) Gianmarco Ercoli	9	15	5	6	DNS	6	6	8	7	6	11	11	535
8	(France) Thomas Ferrando	6	7	6	5	5	16	8	12	8	5	9	14	531
9	(France) Wilfried Boucenna	5	10	16	20	12	13	9	9	10	20	12	10	492
10	(Belgium) Marc Goossens			4	3	13	7			3	2	2	1*	491
11	(Brazil) Marconi Abreu	13	12	21	15	6	10	11	13	15	8	23	23	454
12	(Sweden) Freddy Nordström	7	9	17	8	14	11	19	10	19	DNS	8	21	439
13	(Italy) Dario Caso	19	16	18	19	Wth	15	14	20	13	21	17	12	430
14	(Belgium) Jerry De Weerdt	17	13	23	14	7	12			18	17	16	18	408
15	(Iran) Meisam Taheri			19	17			13	22			22	20	392
16	(France) Lucas Lasserre	8	DNS					23	17	4	18	7	7	386
17	(France) Christophe Bouchut	3	5	8	23	Wth	17	21	5	16	11			357
18	(Germany) Marko Stipp			20	13	15	9	12	19			18	13	295
19	(Czech Republic) Martin Doubek	16	DNS	13	12			24	16			13	15	276
20	(Italy) Fabrizio Armetta							22	23	22	22	15	24	247
21	(Italy) Carlo Alberto Forte	21	18					17	DNS		14			192
22	(Venezuela) Rodolfo González	11	8	15	11									187
23	(France) Hugo Bec									17	10			170
24	(Italy) Claudio Giudice	18	17	12	16					DNS	DNS			136
25	(Japan) Kenko Miura					9	DNS	DNS	18			19	17	130
26	(Denmark) Nicki Petersen									14	12		16	124
27	(Germany) Patrick Simon	10	11					20	14					121
28	(Italy) Renzo Calcinati									20	9			118
29	(Italy) Nicola Larini									11	19			116
30	(Germany) Mirco Schultis	15	14									DNS	Wth	87
30	(Belgium) Eric De Doncker	12	DNS					16	24					87
32	(United States) Bobby Labonte			14	10									64
32	(France) Jean-Baptiste Simmenauer							10	15					64
34	(United Kingdom) Alex Kapadia			10	18									61
35	(France) Éric Hélary											14	9	60
36	(Germany) Dominik Farnbacher							18	11					59
37	(Brazil) Bruno Junqueira			11	21									57
38	(France) Eric van de Vyver							15	21					53
39	(Italy) Francesco Parli											21	22	46
40	(Italy) Alessandro Ciompi	22	DNS											38

== See also ==
- 2017 Monster Energy NASCAR Cup Series
- 2017 NASCAR Xfinity Series
- 2017 NASCAR Camping World Truck Series
- 2017 NASCAR K&N Pro Series East
- 2017 NASCAR K&N Pro Series West
- 2017 NASCAR Whelen Modified Tour
- 2017 NASCAR Pinty's Series
- 2017 NASCAR PEAK Mexico Series
