= Kenko Miura =

Japanese racing driver (born 1979)

- Born: 30 July 1979 (age 47); Tokyo, Japan

NASCAR FedEx Freight Truck Series career
- 1 race run over 1 year
- 2022 position: 79th
- Best finish: 79th (2022)
- First race: 2022 O'Reilly Auto Parts 150 (Mid-Ohio)
Wins	Top tens	Poles
0	0	0

NASCAR Whelen Euro Series career
- Debut season: 2017
- Former teams: Alex Caffi Motorsport, DF1 Racing
- Starts: 29 (Elite 1), 21 (EN2)
- Wins: 0
- Poles: 0
- Fastest laps: 0
- Best finish: 11th in 2018
- Finished last season: 16th in 2020
- Statistics up to date as of 5 November 2022.

Kenko Miura (三浦 健光, Miura Kenko; born 30 July 1979) is a Japanese racing driver who competes part-time in the NASCAR Craftsman Truck Series, driving the No. 63 Toyota Tundra for Akinori Performance. Miura has also previously competed in the NASCAR Xfinity Series, Asian Formula 3 Series and the NASCAR Whelen Euro Series. Miura has competed in a total of 22 Euro Elite 1 races since 2017 and in 17 Euro Elite 2 races between 2017 and 2018. He won the 2018 Challenger's Trophy over Dario Caso.

== Motorsports career results ==
=== NASCAR ===
(key) (Bold – Pole position awarded by qualifying time. Italics – Pole position earned by points standings or practice time. * – Most laps led.)

==== Xfinity Series ====
NASCAR Xfinity Series results
Year	Team	No.	Make	1	2	3	4	5	6	7	8	9	10	11	12	13	14	15	16	17	18	19	20	21	22	23	24	25	26	27	28	29	30	31	32	33	NXSC	Pts	Ref
2024	Joey Gase Motorsports	53	Toyota	DAY	ATL	LVS	PHO	COA	RCH	MAR	TEX	TAL	DOV	DAR	CLT	PIR	SON	IOW	NHA	NSH	CSC; DNQ	POC	IND	MCH	DAY	DAR	ATL	GLN	BRI	KAN	TAL	ROV	LVS	HOM	MAR	PHO	N/A	0	

==== Camping World Truck Series ====
NASCAR Camping World Truck Series results
Year	Team	No.	Make	1	2	3	4	5	6	7	8	9	10	11	12	13	14	15	16	17	18	19	20	21	22	23	NCWTC	Pts	Ref
2022	Reaume Brothers Racing	33	Toyota	DAY	LVS	ATL	COA	MAR	BRI	DAR	KAN	TEX	CLT	GTW	SON	KNX	NSH	MOH; 33	POC	IRP	RCH	KAN	BRI	TAL	HOM	PHO	79th	4	

==== Whelen Euro Series – Elite 1 ====
(key) (Bold – Pole position. Italics – Fastest lap. * – Most laps led. ^ – Most positions gained)

NASCAR Whelen Euro Series – Elite 1 results
Year	Team	No.	Make	1	2	3	4	5	6	7	8	9	10	11	12	13	NWES	Pts
2017	Alex Caffi Motorsport	2	Ford	VAL	VAL	BRH	BRH	VEN; 9	VEN; DNS								25th	130
2017	Alex Caffi Motorsport	2	Toyota							HOC	HOC; 18	FRA	FRA	ZOL; 19	ZOL; 17		25th	130
2018	Alex Caffi Motorsport	2	Toyota	VAL; 17	VAL; 23	FRA; 28	FRA; 15	BRH; 15	BRH; 11	TOU; 14	TOU; 11	HOC; 23	HOC; 11	ZOL; 18	ZOL; 15		15th	333
2019	Alex Caffi Motorsport	2	Chevy	VAL; 22	VAL; 16	FRA; 22	FRA; 27	BRH; 19	BRH; 21	MOS; 23	MOS; 20	VEN; 12	HOC; 26	HOC; 17	ZOL; 22	ZOL; 19	19th	303

==== Whelen Euro Series - EuroNASCAR 2 ====
(key) (Bold – Pole position. Italics – Fastest lap. * – Most laps led. ^ – Most positions gained)

NASCAR Whelen Euro Series - EuroNASCAR 2 results
Year	Team	No.	Make	1	2	3	4	5	6	7	8	9	10	11	12	NWES	Pts
2017	Alex Caffi Motorsport	2	Ford	VAL; 20	VAL; 11	BRH	BRH	VEN; 10	VEN; 10							19th	315
2017	Alex Caffi Motorsport	2	Toyota							HOC; DNS	HOC; 13	FRA	FRA	ZOL; 11	ZOL; 6	19th	315
2018	Alex Caffi Motorsport	2	Toyota	VAL; 5	VAL; 13	FRA	FRA	BRH; 21	BRH; 7^	TOU; 7	TOU; 20	HOC; 8	HOC; 24	ZOL; 3	ZOL; 7	11th	369
2020	DF1 Racing	99	Chevy	ITA	ITA	BEL	BEL	CRO	CRO	ESP1; 9	ESP1; 9	ESP2; 6	ESP2; 13			16th	152
