= Gianmarco Ercoli =

Italian racing driver (born 1995)

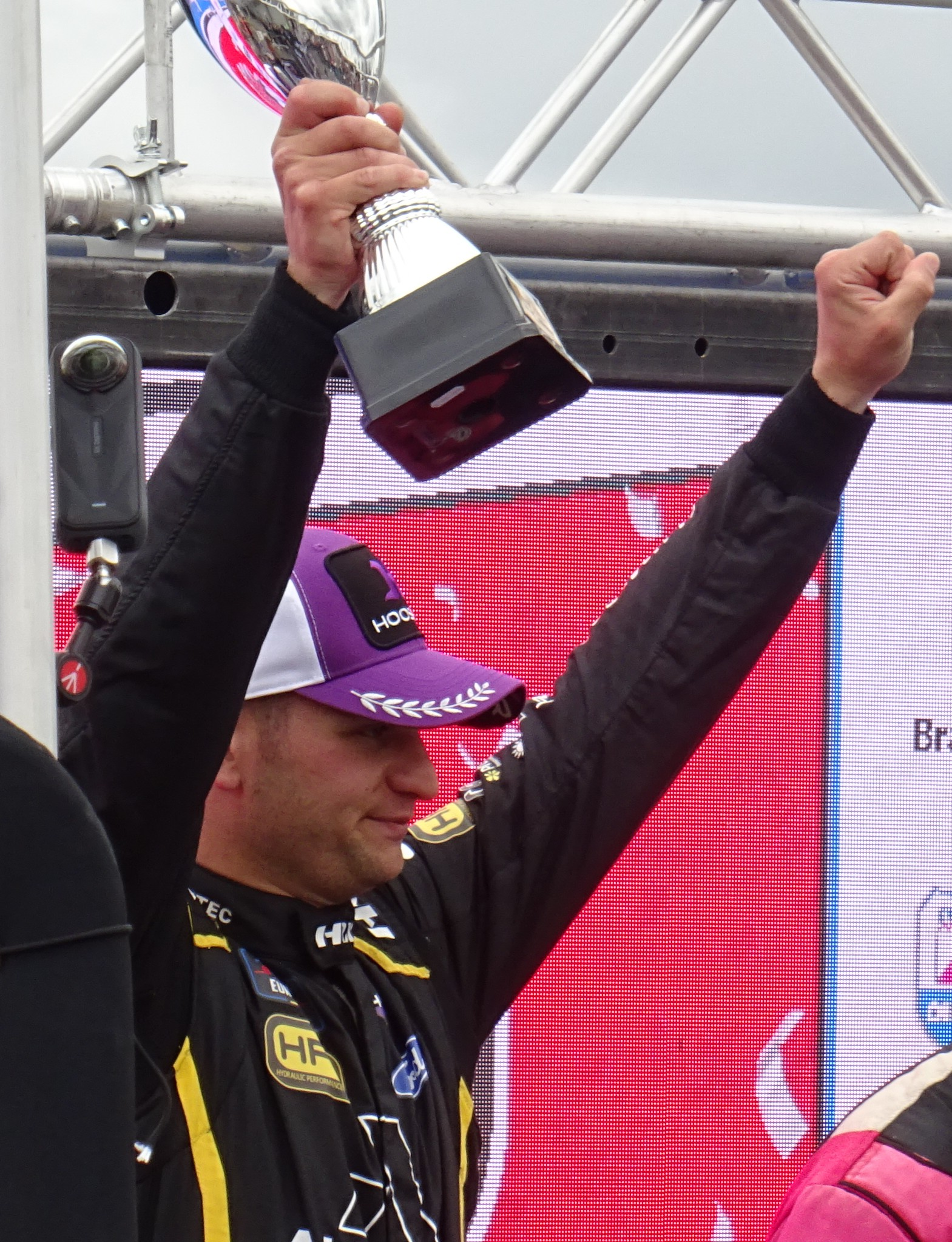
- Ercoli celebrates victory at Brands Hatch in 2025
- Nationality: (Italy) Italian
- Born: May 5, 1995 (age 31) Rome, Lazio, Italy

NASCAR Whelen Euro Series career
- Debut season: 2014
- Current team: CAAL Racing
- Car number: 54
- Starts: 61 (EuroNASCAR PRO); 22 (EuroNASCAR 2)
- Championships: 2 (2015 Elite 2) (2023 PRO)
- Wins: 2 (EuroNASCAR PRO); 4 (EuroNASCAR 2)
- Poles: 0 (EuroNASCAR PRO); 1 (EuroNASCAR 2)
- Fastest laps: 1 (EuroNASCAR PRO); 2 (EuroNASCAR 2)
- Best finish: 1st in 2023 (PRO)
- Finished last season: 1st in 2023

Previous series
- 2003–13: Karting

Championship titles
- 2015 & 2023: NASCAR Whelen Euro Series – Elite 2 & NASCAR Whelen Euro Series – PRO

Gianmarco Ercoli (born 5 May 1995 in Rome) is an Italian professional racing driver that currently competes in the NASCAR Whelen Euro Series, driving the No. 11 Ford Mustang for Alumitec Racing, a new team with technical support from CAAL Racing in the EuroNASCAR PRO class. He previously drove No. 54 Chevrolet Camaro. He is a two-time champion in the Euro Series, having won the Elite 2 championship title in 2015 and the PRO Class championship title in 2023.

== Racing career ==
Ercoli started his racing career in 2003 on karting. During his karting career, he won the 2009 Italian Open Masters in the KF3 class. He made his racing debut in 2014 when CAAL Racing entered him in the second round of the 2014 NASCAR Whelen Euro Series season at Brands Hatch. He scored his career podium finish in his home race at Magione. Ercoli would finish his debut season in 11th place with two podium finishes and five top-ten finishes.

Driving for Double T by MRT Nocentini in the No. 9 team in 2015, Ercoli beat Stienes Longin by 0.3 seconds to score a victory in the first Elite 2 race of the season at Valencia, his first career win in the Euro Series. At Tours, he scored his first win on an oval when he beat Ulysse Delsaux in a green-white-checkered finish on the Sunday race. Ercoli would sweep the season finale round at Zolder to claim the Elite 2 title despite he entered the race in fourth place in the championship. Ercoli would finish his season with four wins, ten Top-5s, and eleven Top-10 finishes.

As a reward for winning the Elite 2 title, Ercoli made his racing debut in the United States in 2016 when he took part in a NASCAR Whelen All-American Series late model race at New Smyrna. He moved up to the Elite 1 class for the 2016 season, staying with the No. 9 Double T team. Ercoli finished his debut season in Elite 1 in eighth place with four top-fives and six top-tens finishes, achieving a best finishing result of fourth in the second race at Venray and the first race at Zolder.

In 2017, Ercoli stayed in the No. 9 team as Double T and Vict Motorsport merged to form Racers Motorsport. Ercoli would improve his position in the Elite 1 championship as he finished the 2017 season in seventh place with eight top-ten finishes with a best finish of fifth at Brands Hatch.

In 2018, Ercoli scored his first Elite 1 podium finish in his home race at Franciacorta before he became the first Elite 2 alumnus to win a race in the Elite 1 class after he scored a victory from pole position in the Sunday race at Brands Hatch. Ercoli would finish the season in 8th place once again, having scored one victory, three top-fives, and eight top-ten finishes.

Ercoli began the 2019 NASCAR Whelen Euro Series season with two finishes outside of the top-20 in the season opening round at Valencia. His first top-ten finish of the season came at his home race at Franciacorta, where he finished in seventh place on the Saturday race. His first top-five finish came during the Playoff races at Hockenheim, where he finished fourth in the Saturday race before he scored his only podium finish of the season with a third-place finish in the Sunday race. He closed his season with a double top-five finish at Zolder to secure sixth place in the championship, his best championship finish in Elite 1 so far. He finished the 2019 season with 1 podium, for top-fives, and eight top-ten finishes.

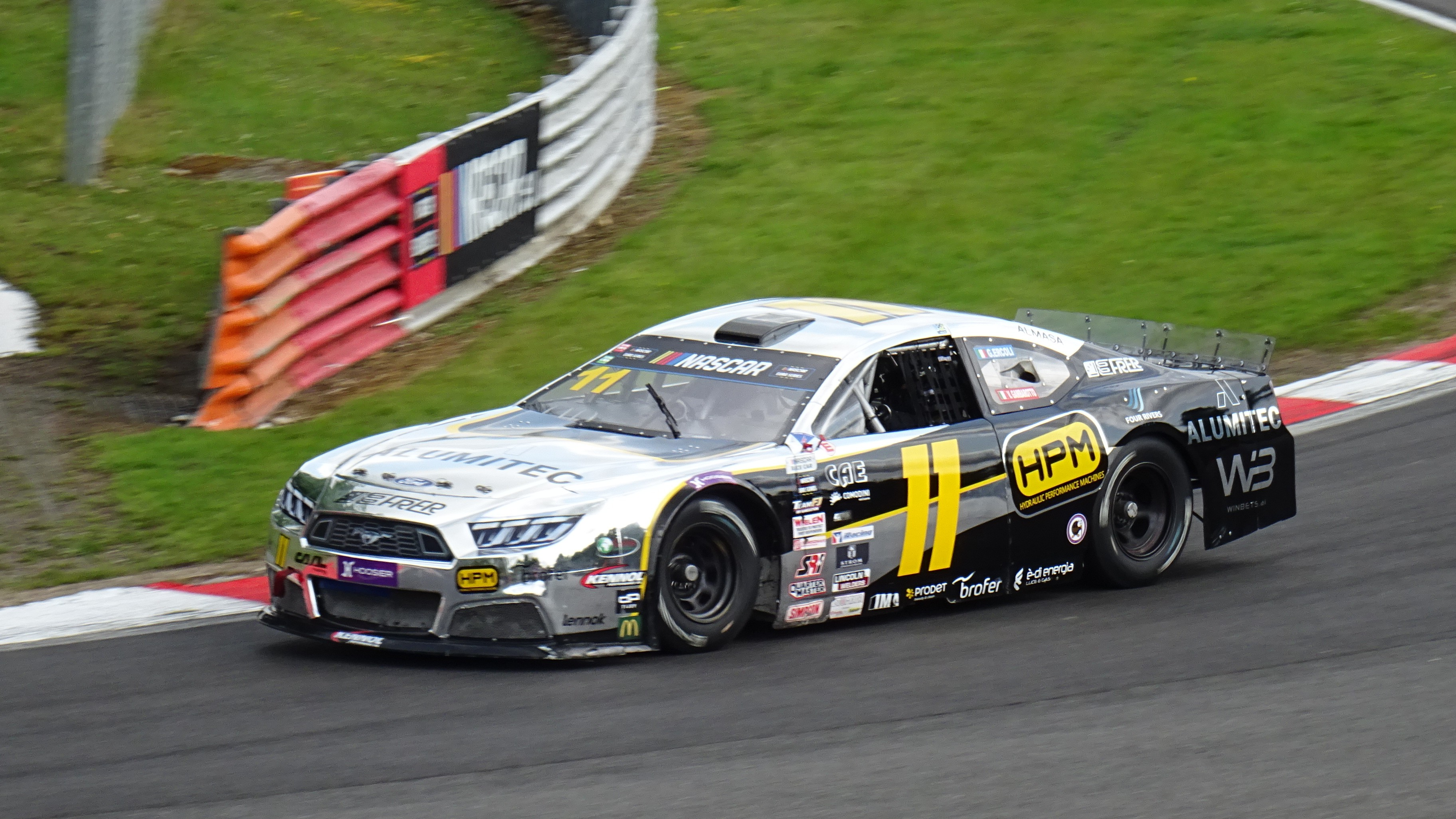
Ercoli at Brands Hatch in 2025

Ercoli rejoined CAAL Racing on 2020 as the replacement driver for Alon Day, who left the team to join PK Carsport. He won on just his second race with CAAL at Vallelunga, but he later received a ten-point penalty for jumping the start. For the third round at Rijeka, Ercoli temporarily raced Mishumotors' No. 70 car after teammate Arianna Casoli suffered a heavy crash in EuroNASCAR 2 Qualifying that wrote off the No. 54 car's chassis. He would eventually finish the year in sixth with one win, three podiums, and eight top-five finishes. After losing the title fight at the NASCAR Whelen Euro Finals in Rijeka against Alon Day in the 2022 season, his iron-maiden title came in the next year, after a solid run of results and an unreal battle till to the last lap of the last appointment in Zolder, against Lucas Lasserre and Vittorio Ghirelli.

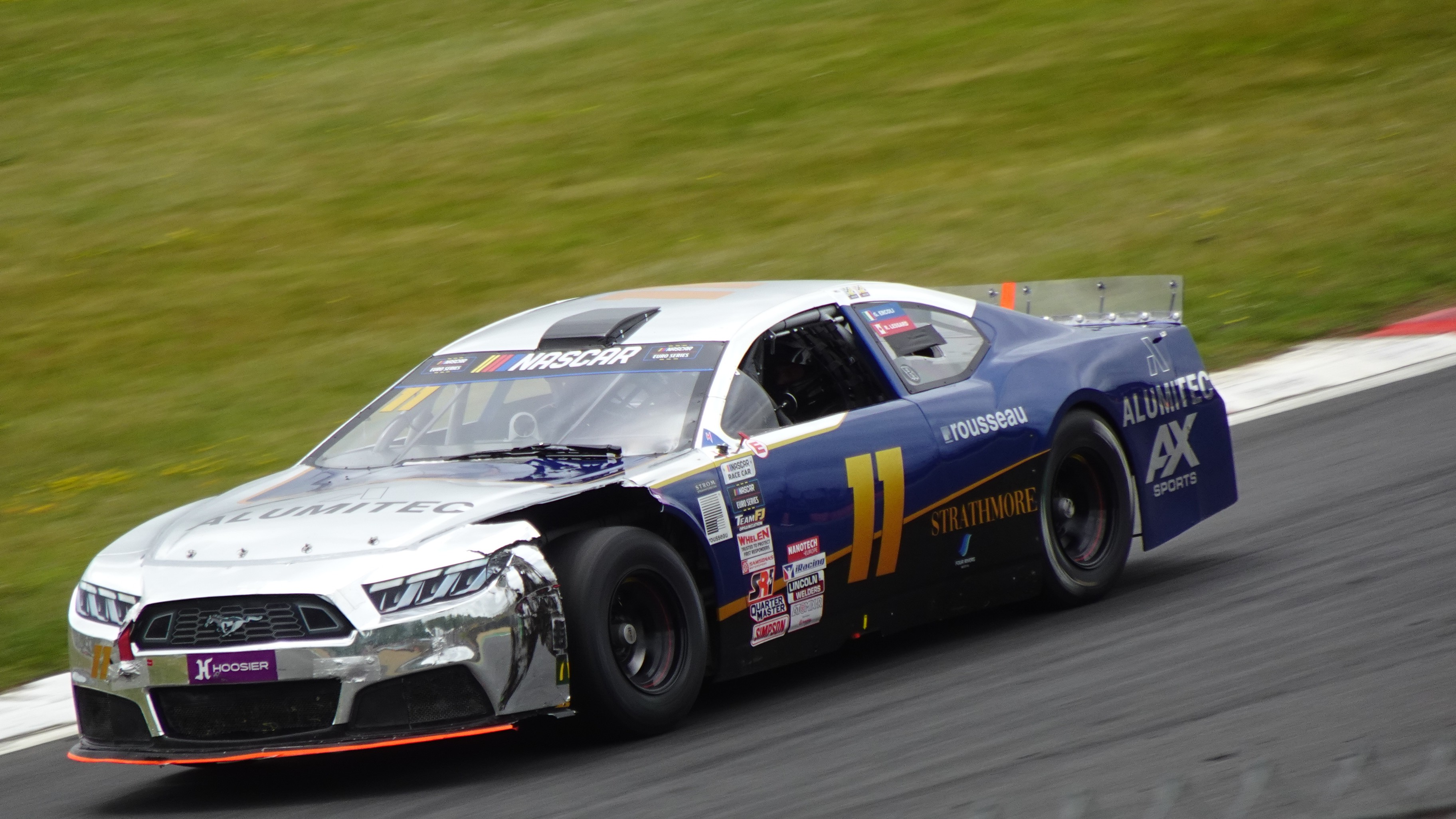
Ercoli racing at Brands Hatch in 2026

In 2023, Ercoli earned his first EuroNASCAR PRO championship on the No. 54 CAAL Racing Chevrolet Camaro. In the last race of the season, Ercoli started the race 17th and ended under the chequered flag in fourth. This gave him eight bonus for the most gained positions in the 18-lap race.

In 2025, it was announced that the Alumitec Racing team, a new team from Canada, would be entering the NASCAR Euro Series with Ercoli leading the charge in the PRO division. Velentino Gambarotto also joined the team, making his international racing debut.

== Complete motorsports results ==
=== NASCAR ===
==== Whelen Euro Series - EuroNASCAR PRO ====
(key) Bold - Pole position awarded by fastest qualifying time (in Race 1) or by previous race's fastest lap (in Race 2). Italics - Fastest lap. * – Most laps led. ^ – Most positions gained.)

NASCAR Whelen Euro Series - EuroNASCAR PRO results
Year	Team	No.	Make	1	2	3	4	5	6	7	8	9	10	11	12	13	NWES	Pts
2015	Double T by MRT Nocentini	9	Chevy	VAL	VAL	VEN; 14	VEN; DNS	BRH	BRH	TOU; DNS	TOU; DNS	UMB; DNS	UMB; DNS	ZOL; DNS	ZOL; DNS		20th	207
2016	Double T by MRT Nocentini	9	Ford	VAL; 5	VAL; 13	VEN; 14	VEN; 4	BRH; 11	BRH; 9	TOU; 11	TOU; 13	ADR; 22	ADR; 10	ZOL; 4	ZOL; 5		8th	525
2017	Racers Motorsport	9	Ford	VAL; 9	VAL; 15	BRH; 5	BRH; 6	VEN; DNS	VEN; 6	HOC; 6	HOC; 8	FRA; 7	FRA; 6	ZOL; 11	ZOL; 11		7th	535
2018	Racers Motorsport	9	Ford	VAL; 10	VAL; 7	FRA; 3	FRA; 23	BRH; 25	**BRH**; 1*	TOU; 10	TOU; 9	HOC; 19	HOC; 5	ZOL; 8	ZOL; 13		8th	407
2019	Racers Motorsport	9	Ford	VAL; 25	VAL; 21	FRA; 7	FRA; 19	BRH; 7	BRH; 7	MOS; 7	MOS; 16	VEN; 15	HOC; 4	HOC; 3	ZOL; 4	ZOL; 5	6th	452
2020	CAAL Racing	54	Chevy	ITA; 3	ITA; 1*	BEL; 5	BEL; 2			ESP1; 5	ESP1; 5	ESP2; 4	ESP2; 20				6th	350
2020	Mishumotors	70	Chevy					CRO; 12^	CRO; 5								6th	350
2021	CAAL Racing	54	Chevy	ESP; 3	ESP; 2	GBR	GBR	CZE	CZE	CRO	CRO	BEL	BEL	ITA	ITA		2nd	409
2023	CAAL Racing	54	Chevy	VAL 3	VAL 14	GBR 1	GBR 1	ITA 1	ITA 2	CZE 15	CZE 5	GER 5	GER 5	BEL; 10	BEL; 4		1st	413

==== Whelen Euro Series - Elite 2 ====
(key) Bold - Pole position awarded by fastest qualifying time (in Race 1) or by previous race's fastest lap (in Race 2). Italics - Fastest lap. * – Most laps led. ^ – Most positions gained.)

NASCAR Whelen Euro Series - Elite 2 results
Year	Team	No.	Make	1	2	3	4	5	6	7	8	9	10	11	12	NWES	Pts
2014	CAAL Racing	31	Chevy	VAL	VAL	BRH; 25	BRH; 7	TOU; 10	TOU; 24	NÜR; 4	NÜR; 17					11th	487
2014	CAAL Racing	25	Chevy									UMB; 2	UMB; 13	BUG; 2	BUG; 16	11th	487
2015	Double T by MRT Nocentini	9	Chevy	VAL; 1*	VAL; 2*	VEN; 5	VEN; 3	BRH; 5	BRH; 8	TOU; 5	**TOU**; 1*	UMB; 22	UMB; 5	**ZOL**; 1*	**ZOL**; 1*	1st	663

^{*} Season still in progress

Sporting positions
Preceded by Maxime Dumarey	NASCAR Whelen Euro Series Elite 2 Champion; 2015	Succeeded by Stienes Longin
