= Franciacorta =

Franciacorta may refer to:

- Franciacorta (region), historical region in Italy
- Franciacorta (wine)
