= Lucas Lasserre =

French racing driver

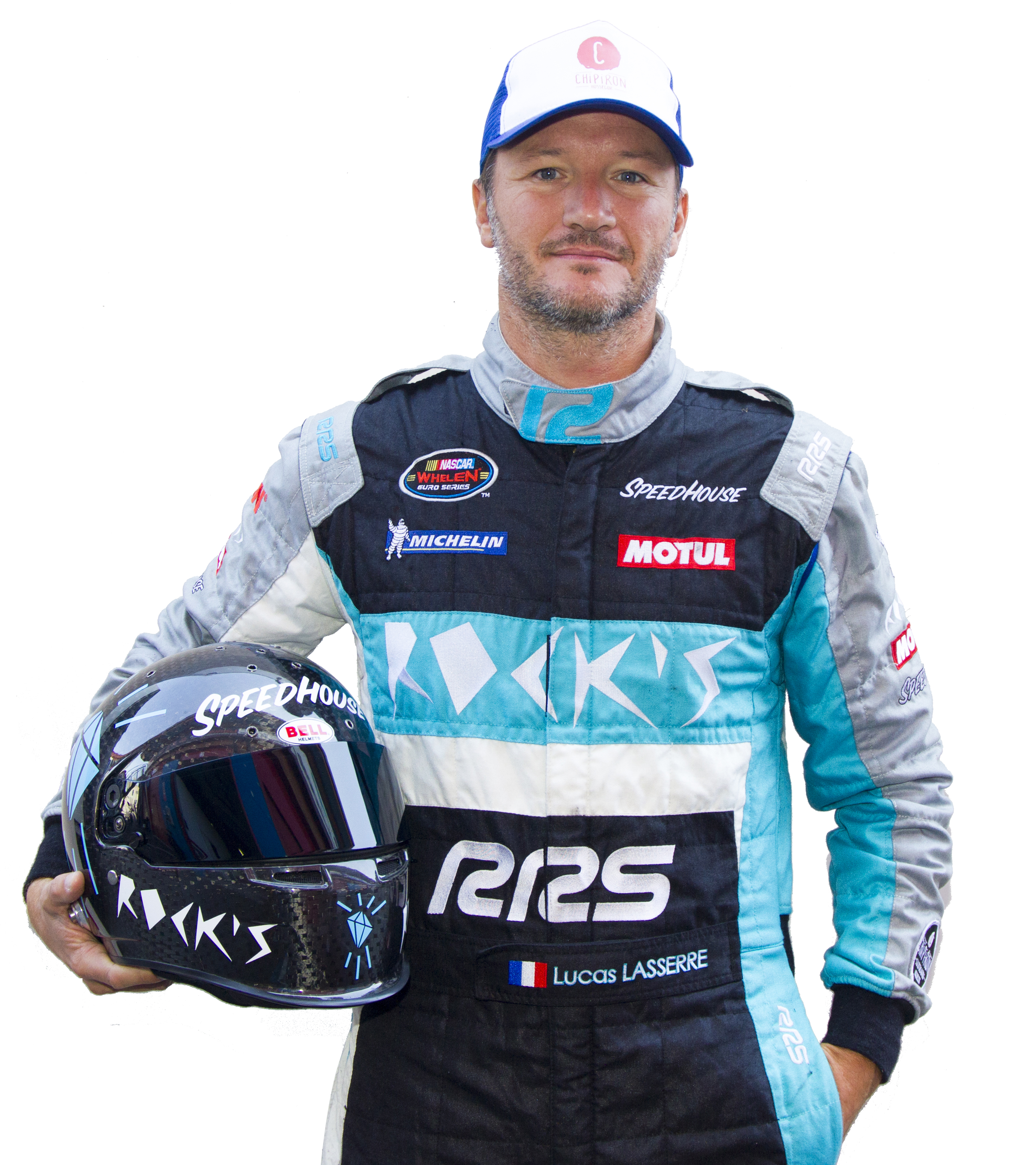
- Lucas Lasserre in 2017
- Nationality: (France) French
- Born: Lucas Paul André René Lasserre; 9 March 1978 (age 48) Pau, Nouvelle-Aquitaine

NASCAR Whelen Euro Series career
- Debut season: 2017
- Current team: Speedhouse
- Car number: 64
- Engine: Ford
- Starts: 52
- Wins: 1
- Poles: 0
- Fastest laps: 0
- Best finish: 3rd in 2018, 2021
- Finished last season: 3rd in 2021

Championship titles
- 2009 – 2010: Racecar Euro Series

Lucas Paul André René Lasserre (born 9 March 1978) is a French racing driver who competes in the NASCAR Whelen Euro Series. He is currently driving the No. 64 Ford Mustang as the owner-driver of SpeedHouse.

== Racing career ==
Lasserre started racing karts in France and dominated Formula Renault and Spanish Formula Three before moving to sports cars and GT cars for Panoz in European Le Mans Series and Lamborghini Japan in Super GT. He also worked as a manufacturer for Renault Sport, Michelin, Oreca, and Norma Auto Concept from 2003 to 2008. He has also raced in the 24 Hours of Le Mans' LMP1 class.

In July 2008, Lasserre created the event promotion company Carre Sport, which oversaw the EffiTIC-Carre Sport cars. The company, in default, was put into liquidation in February 2012.

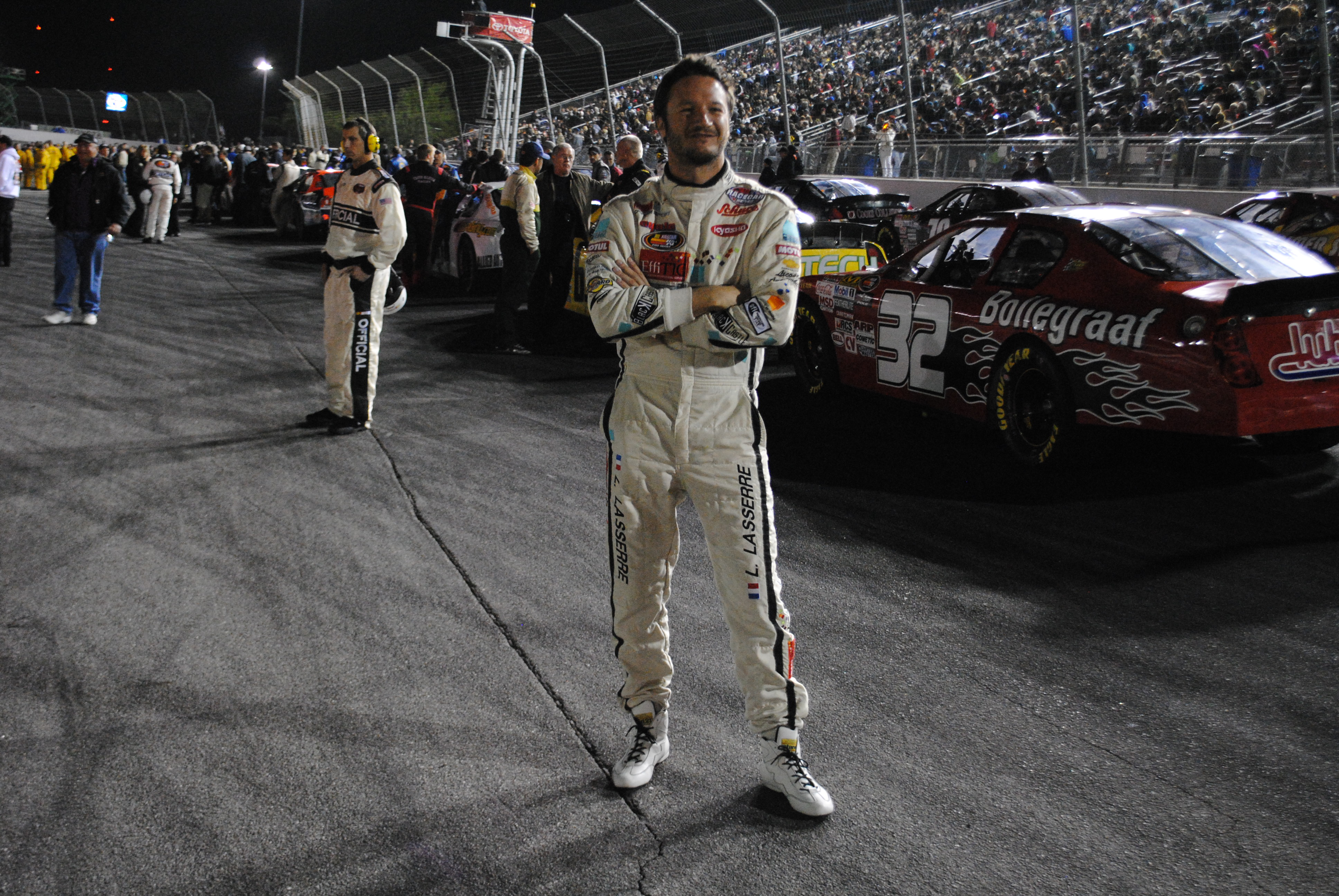
Lasserre during the 2011 Toyota Allstars Showdown at Irwindale

In 2009, Lasserre joined the new Racecar Euro Series and he won the Elite class title to become the inaugural champions of the series. Lasserre successfully defended his title in 2010. As a reward for becoming a double champion, he received an invitation to compete in the 2011 edition of the Toyota All-Star Showdown at Irwindale Speedway and despite qualifying in 38th, he would finish the race in 15th place.

After leaving the Euro Series in 2011, Lasserre returned in 2017 for his first season in the Euro Series under NASCAR official sanctioning. He initially competes with Dog Racing before switching to Mishumotors mid-season. The following year, he returned to compete full-time with Mishumotors in the No. 33 team. He scored his first victory in the NASCAR-sanctioned era of Euro Series at the second Elite 1 race at Franciacorta after initial race winner Alon Day was disqualified for failing post-race inspection. Lasserre would finish third in the standings after scoring two further podiums at Hockenheim.

Lasserre continued to compete with Mishumotors for the next two seasons, finishing 17th in the overall standings in 2019 and fourth in 2020. During the 2019 season, Lasserre started to field his own team SpeedHouse in the series. SpeedHouse competed part-time for the 2019 and 2020 seasons using a variety of drivers before the team made the step up to full-time competition in 2021, with Lasserre now acting as the team's primary driver. Lasserre went on to finish third in the championship once again after scoring three podiums and ten top-ten finishes.

== Racing record ==
=== Career summary ===
- 1995: French Formula Renault ELF Campus – Finished 7th of the Championship
- 1998: French Formula Renault Championship – Finished 3rd of the Championship
- 1999: Winner of the Championship – French Formula Renault Championship – Won 8 out of 12 events
- 2000: French Formula 3 series – Finish 5th of the championship
- 2001: French Formula 3 series – Team Signature
- 2002: Spanish Formula 3 series – Team Racing Engineering – 3 wins & 5podiums finishes
- 2003:
  - French GT Championship – Driving for DDO Organisation – Porsche GT3 RSR
  - 24 Hours of Le Mans with Sezio Florida Racing Team – Qualified for the 24 Hours of Le Mans
- 2004: French Tourism Championship: Team Tarrés
- 2005: French Tourism Championship – Team Tarrés – Chrystler Viper GTS-R
- 2006: French Tourism Championship – Team Tarrés
- 2007:
  - Official Driver Panoz Esperante GT LM – LMS Championship – Team LNT
  - French Tourism Championship – Team Mirabeau Competition
- 2009: Winner of the Elite Championship – NASCAR Whelen Euro Series
- 2010: Winner of the Elite Championship – NASCAR Whelen Euro Series
- 2011:
  - Finished 3rd in the Championship – Porsche Carrera Cup
  - NASCAR K&N Pro Series – Toyota Allstars Showdown at Irwindale: Finish 15th (First time on an Oval Race)
- 2014:
  - European Le Mans Series
  - 24 Heures de spa with Team Pro GT by Almeras: 7th Pro Am
- 2017: NASCAR Whelen Euro Series – Team Dog Racing & Mishumotors
- 2018: NASCAR Whelen Euro Series – Team Mishumotors
- 2019: NASCAR Whelen Euro Series – Team Mishumotors
- 2020: NASCAR Whelen Euro Series – Team Mishumotors
- 2021: NASCAR Whelen Euro Series – Team SpeedHouse
- 2022: NASCAR Whelen Euro Series – Team SpeedHouse
- 2023: NASCAR Whelen Euro Series – Team SpeedHouse
- 2024: NASCAR Whelen Euro Series – Team SpeedHouse

=== NASCAR ===
(key) (Bold – Pole position awarded by qualifying time. Italics – Pole position earned by points standings or practice time. * – Most laps led.)

==== Whelen Euro Series – EuroNASCAR PRO ====
NASCAR Whelen Euro Series – EuroNASCAR PRO results
Year	Team	No.	Make	1	2	3	4	5	6	7	8	9	10	11	12	13	NWES	Pts
2017	Dog Racing	95	Ford	VAL; 8	VAL; DNS	BRH	BRH	VEN	VEN	TOU; 23	TOU; 17						16th	386
2017	Mishumotors	33	Chevrolet									FRA; 4	FRA; 18	ZOL; 7	ZOL; 7		16th	386
2018	Mishumotors	33	Chevrolet	VAL; 6	VAL; 10	FRA; 5	FRA; 1	BRH; 5	BRH; 15	TOU; 6	TOU; 12	HOC; 3	HOC; 3	ZOL; 28	ZOL; 6		3rd	446
2019	Mishumotors	33	Chevrolet	VAL; 4	VAL; 24	FRA; 17	FRA; 8	BRH; 5	BRH; 24	MOS; 4	MOS; 17	VEN	HOC; 6	HOC; DNS	ZOL; 25	ZOL; 10	17th	336
2020	Mishumotors	33	Chevrolet	ITA; 4	ITA; 3	BEL; 14	BEL; 14	CRO; 9	CRO; 20	ESP1; 3	ESP1; 9	ESP2; 3	ESP2; 7				4th	256
2021	SpeedHouse	64	Ford	ESP; 8	ESP; 6	GBR; 12	GBR; 7	CZE; 9	CZE; 5	CRO; 4	CRO; 11	BEL; 2	BEL; 3	ITA; 4	ITA; 3		3rd	399
