= 2020 eNASCAR iRacing Pro Invitational Series =

First season of the eNASCAR iRacing Pro Invitational Series

The 2020 eNASCAR iRacing Pro Invitational Series was the first season of the eNASCAR iRacing Pro Invitational Series, a series of iRacing sim racing events originally organized for NASCAR drivers to compete in after its 2020 seasons were put on hold due to the COVID-19 pandemic. Drivers from all of NASCAR's series competed in races, including Hall of Fame drivers Dale Earnhardt Jr., Bobby Labonte, and Jeff Gordon. Each weekend, the series would race on virtual versions of the racetracks that the NASCAR Cup Series would have raced at that weekend had the real races not been postponed, except for the final race at North Wilkesboro, a former NASCAR track which last hosted a NASCAR race in 1996, to launch the track joining iRacing. The series began at March 22 with a race at the virtual Homestead-Miami Speedway, and concluded with a race at the virtual North Wilkesboro Speedway on May 9.

Originally supposed to be a one-time event, it quickly became a weekly series, and later included the Saturday Night Thunder series of races for drivers in NASCAR's lower series.

== Teams and drivers ==
=== Main events ===
==== Complete schedule ====
Manufacturer	Team	No.	Race driver
Chevrolet	Germain Racing	13	Ty Dillon
Chevrolet	Hendrick Motorsports	24	William Byron 6
Chevrolet	Hendrick Motorsports	24	Jeff Gordon 1
Chevrolet	JR Motorsports	8	Dale Earnhardt Jr.
Chevrolet	JTG Daugherty Racing	37	Ryan Preece
Chevrolet	Richard Childress Racing	3	Austin Dillon
Chevrolet	Rick Ware Racing	51	Garrett Smithley
Chevrolet	Shepherd Racing Ventures	89	Landon Cassill
Ford	Front Row Motorsports	34	Michael McDowell
Ford	Front Row Motorsports	38	John Hunter Nemechek
Ford	Roush Fenway Racing	6	Ross Chastain
Ford	Roush Fenway Racing	17	Chris Buescher
Ford	Wood Brothers Racing	21	Matt DiBenedetto 6
Ford	Wood Brothers Racing	21	Jon Wood 1
Toyota	Burton-Kligerman eSports	77	Parker Kligerman
Toyota	Joe Gibbs Racing	11	Denny Hamlin
Toyota	Joe Gibbs Racing	18	Kyle Busch
Toyota	Joe Gibbs Racing	19	Bobby Labonte 6
Toyota	Joe Gibbs Racing	19	Martin Truex Jr. 1
Toyota	Joe Gibbs Racing	20	Erik Jones
Toyota	Leavine Family Racing	95	Christopher Bell
Toyota	MBM Motorsports	66	Timmy Hill

==== Limited schedule ====
Manufacturer	Team	No.	Race driver	Rounds
Chevrolet	Brandonbilt Motorsports	68	Brandon Brown	1
Chevrolet	Chip Ganassi Racing	1	Kurt Busch	6
Chevrolet	Chip Ganassi Racing	42	Kyle Larson	3
Chevrolet	DGM Racing	90	Alex Labbé	1
Chevrolet	Furniture Row Racing	78	Regan Smith	1
Chevrolet	GMS Racing	23	Sam Mayer	1
Chevrolet	GMS Racing	26	Tyler Ankrum	1
Chevrolet	Hendrick Motorsports	9	Chase Elliott	5
Chevrolet	Hendrick Motorsports	024	Jeff Gordon	1
Chevrolet	Hendrick Motorsports	48	Jimmie Johnson	6
Chevrolet	Hendrick Motorsports	88	Alex Bowman	6
Chevrolet	Jesse Iwuji Motorsports	36	Jesse Iwuji	2
Chevrolet	JR Motorsports	7	Justin Allgaier	2
Chevrolet	JR Motorsports	08	Jeb Burton	1
Chevrolet	JTG Daugherty Racing	47	Ricky Stenhouse Jr.	4
Chevrolet	Kaulig Racing	10	Justin Haley	2
Chevrolet	Niece Motorsports	40	Ryan Truex	2
Chevrolet	Niece Motorsports	45	Ty Majeski	2
Chevrolet	Premium Motorsports	15	Brennan Poole	5
Chevrolet	Richard Childress Racing	29	Kaz Grala	1
Chevrolet	Richard Childress Racing	31	Tyler Reddick	6
Chevrolet	Richard Childress Racing	33	Anthony Alfredo	2
Chevrolet	Richard Childress Racing	93	Myatt Snider	2
Chevrolet	Richard Petty Motorsports	43	Bubba Wallace	4
Chevrolet	SS-Green Light Racing	80	Joe Graf Jr.	1
Chevrolet	The Money Team Racing (Note: Entries were fielded in a collaboration with JD Motorsports.)	50	Jeffrey Earnhardt	2
Chevrolet	Young's Motorsports	02	Spencer Boyd	1
Ford	Bayne Motorsports	29A	Trevor Bayne	1
Ford	B. J. McLeod Motorsports	78	Ryan Ellis	1
Ford	Canel's Racing	27	Rubén García Jr.	1
Ford	Front Row Motorsports	35	Todd Gilliland	1
Ford	Go Fas Racing	32	Corey LaJoie	4
Ford	Roush Fenway Racing	16	Greg Biffle	1
Ford	Rick Ware Racing	52	J. J. Yeley	5
Ford	Rick Ware Racing	54	Kyle Weatherman	1
Ford	Stewart–Haas Racing	4	Kevin Harvick	4
Ford	Stewart–Haas Racing	10	Aric Almirola	3
Ford	Stewart–Haas Racing	14	Clint Bowyer	6
Ford	Stewart–Haas Racing	41	Cole Custer	4
Ford	Stewart–Haas Racing	98	Chase Briscoe	2
Ford	Team Penske	2	Brad Keselowski	5
Ford	Team Penske	12	Austin Cindric	1
Ford	Team Penske	12	Ryan Blaney	5
Ford	Team Penske	22	Joey Logano	5
Ford	Team Penske	22	Austin Cindric	1
Toyota	Gaunt Brothers Racing	96	Daniel Suárez	5
Toyota	Halmar Friesen Racing	52	Stewart Friesen	2
Toyota	Joe Gibbs Racing	018	Bobby Labonte	1
Toyota	Joe Gibbs Racing	99	Harrison Burton (Note: Entry was fielded in a collaboration with Burton-Kligerman eSports.)	1
Toyota	Kyle Busch Motorsports	46	Chandler Smith	1
Toyota	Kyle Busch Motorsports	81	Christian Eckes	1
Toyota	MBM Motorsports	49	Chad Finchum	2
Toyota	McAnally–Hilgemann Racing	5	Derek Kraus	1
Toyota	Spraker Racing Enterprises	63	Scott Stenzel	1
Ford 4 Chevrolet 1	Rick Ware Racing	53	Joey Gase	5

=== Thunder races ===
==== Complete schedule ====
Manufacturer	Team	No.	Race driver
Chevrolet	B. J. McLeod Motorsports	5	Matt Mills
Chevrolet	B. J. McLeod Motorsports	99	Josh Bilicki
Chevrolet	DGM Racing	90	Alex Labbé
Chevrolet	Jesse Iwuji Motorsports	36	Jesse Iwuji
Chevrolet	JR Motorsports	8	Jeb Burton
Chevrolet	Niece Motorsports	40	Ryan Truex
Chevrolet	Richard Childress Racing	29	Kaz Grala
Chevrolet	Richard Childress Racing	33	Anthony Alfredo
Chevrolet	Richard Childress Racing	93	Myatt Snider
Chevrolet	Rodgers Motorsports	55	Will Rodgers
Chevrolet	Spraker Racing Enterprises	63	Scott Stenzel
Chevrolet	Young's Motorsports	02	Spencer Boyd
Ford	Canel's Racing	27	Rubén García Jr.
Toyota	Joe Gibbs Racing	20	Harrison Burton
Toyota	Kyle Busch Motorsports	81	Christian Eckes
Toyota	MBM Motorsports	25	Stephen Leicht
Toyota	McAnally–Hilgemann Racing	19	Derek Kraus
Toyota	Rev Racing	4	Chase Cabre
Chevrolet 4 Ford 1	B. J. McLeod Motorsports	78	Ryan Ellis

==== Limited schedule ====
Manufacturer	Team	No.	Race driver	Rounds
Chevrolet	Brandonbilt Motorsports	68	Brandon Brown	4
Chevrolet	Currey Motorsports	05	Bayley Currey (Note: Currey ran the full season split between Currey Motorsports' No. 05 and Mike Harmon Racing's No. 74.)	1
Chevrolet	CMI Motorsports	83	Stefan Parsons	1
Chevrolet	Dean Motorsports	56	Gus Dean	1
Chevrolet	DGM Racing	92	Josh Williams	2
Chevrolet	Elliott Sadler eSports	99	Elliott Sadler	1
Chevrolet	GMS Racing	16	Sheldon Creed	1
Chevrolet	GMS Racing	21	Sam Mayer	1
Chevrolet	GMS Racing	23	Sam Mayer	1
Chevrolet	GMS Racing	23	Brett Moffitt	3
Chevrolet	GMS Racing	26	Tyler Ankrum	3
Chevrolet	JD Motorsports	0	Jeffrey Earnhardt	3
Chevrolet	JD Motorsports	51	Ryan Vargas	3
Chevrolet	JR Motorsports	1	Michael Annett	3
Chevrolet	JR Motorsports	7	Justin Allgaier	4
Chevrolet	JR Motorsports	9	Noah Gragson	4
Chevrolet	JR Motorsports	88	Josh Berry	4
Chevrolet	Kaulig Racing	11	Justin Haley	2
Chevrolet	Koch Motorsports	57	Blake Koch	4
Chevrolet	Martins Motorsports	44	Tommy Joe Martins	2
Chevrolet	Mike Harmon Racing	74	Bayley Currey	4
Chevrolet	Niece Motorsports	45	Ty Majeski	4
Chevrolet	Premium Motorsports	15	Brennan Poole	2
Chevrolet	Reaume Brothers Racing	00	Angela Ruch	2
Chevrolet	Rick Ware Racing	53	Joey Gase	2
Chevrolet	RSS Racing	39	C. J. McLaughlin	3
Chevrolet	Shepherd Racing Ventures	89	Landon Cassill	1
Chevrolet	Shepherd Racing Ventures	89	Landon Huffman (Note: Huffman ran the full season split between Total Advantage Motorsports' No. 75 and Shepherd Racing Ventures' No. 89, which was in a collaboration with TAM.) (Note: Entry was fielded in a collaboration with Total Advantage Motorsports.)	1
Chevrolet	SS-Green Light Racing	08	Joe Graf Jr.	3
Ford	Bayne Motorsports	29	Trevor Bayne	1
Ford	DGR-Crosley	46	Thad Moffitt	2
Ford	Front Row Motorsports	34	Michael McDowell	1
Ford	Front Row Motorsports	38	Todd Gilliland	4
Ford	Rick Ware Racing	85	J. J. Yeley	2
Ford	Seavey Motorsports	67	Logan Seavey	4
Ford	Stewart–Haas Racing	41	Cole Custer	1
Ford	Stewart–Haas Racing	98	Chase Briscoe	4
Ford	Team Penske	22	Austin Cindric	4
Ford	ThorSport Racing	98	Grant Enfinger	1
Toyota	Halmar Friesen Racing	52	Stewart Friesen	2
Toyota	Herring Motorsports	3	Drew Herring	3
Toyota	Joe Gibbs Racing	18	Ty Gibbs	3
Toyota	Kyle Busch Motorsports	04	Raphaël Lessard	1
Toyota	Kyle Busch Motorsports	46	Chandler Smith	1
Toyota	MBM Motorsports	13	Chad Finchum	1
Toyota	SS-Green Light Racing	07	Donny Lia	3
Toyota	Venturini Motorsports	15	Drew Dollar	3
Chevrolet 2 Ford 2	Rick Ware Racing	54	Kyle Weatherman	4
Toyota 1 Chevrolet 3	Total Advantage Motorsports	75	Landon Huffman	4

== Races ==
=== Dixie Vodka 150 (Homestead–Miami) ===
This was the first race of the series. Garrett Smithley won the pole and was passed by William Byron on the first lap, who would go on to lead the most laps in the race. Denny Hamlin passed then-leader Dale Earnhardt Jr. in a photo finish on the final lap to win.

Top ten finishers:

Pos	No	Driver	Manufacturer
1	11	Denny Hamlin	Toyota
2	8	Dale Earnhardt Jr.	Chevrolet
3	66	Timmy Hill	Toyota
4	98	Chase Briscoe	Ford
5	51	Garrett Smithley	Chevrolet
6	88	Alex Bowman	Chevrolet
7	43	Bubba Wallace	Chevrolet
8	37	Ryan Preece	Chevrolet
9	45	Ty Majeski	Chevrolet
10	20	Erik Jones	Toyota
Official race results

=== O'Reilly Auto Parts 125 (Texas) ===
==== Qualifying race ====
The qualifying race was held earlier on Sunday, March 29, before the main event. The drivers that advanced to the main event were Alex Labbé, Anthony Alfredo, Ty Majeski, and Rubén García Jr., who finished first through fourth, respectively.

Top ten finishers:

Pos	No	Driver	Manufacturer
1	90	Alex Labbé	Chevrolet
2	33	Anthony Alfredo	Chevrolet
3	45	Ty Majeski	Chevrolet
4	27	Rubén García Jr.	Ford
5	08	Jeb Burton	Chevrolet
6	5	Derek Kraus	Toyota
7	15	Brennan Poole	Chevrolet
8	29	Kaz Grala	Chevrolet
9	52	Stewart Friesen	Toyota
10	80	Joe Graf Jr.	Chevrolet

Note: Kaz Grala and Trevor Bayne both used the No. 29 in this race. On the official race results, Bayne was listed as the No. 29A to differentiate the two.

==== Main event ====
Timmy Hill won the race after executing a late bump-and-run maneuver on then-leader William Byron.

Top ten finishers:

Pos	No	Driver	Manufacturer
1	66	Timmy Hill	Toyota
2	37	Ryan Preece	Chevrolet
3	51	Garrett Smithley	Chevrolet
4	89	Landon Cassill	Chevrolet
5	88	Alex Bowman	Chevrolet
6	8	Dale Earnhardt Jr.	Chevrolet
7	24	William Byron	Chevrolet
8	38	John Hunter Nemechek	Ford
9	42	Kyle Larson	Chevrolet
10	1	Kurt Busch	Chevrolet
Official race results

=== Food City Showdown (Bristol) ===
==== Saturday Night Thunder ====
After heat races determined a 24 car starting field for the race, Logan Seavey (No. 67), in his first Pro Invitational Series start, won the race after passing Chase Cabre (No. 4) with thirteen laps to go.

Heat Race results: Drivers listed advanced to the main event.

Pos	No	Driver	Manufacturer
1	57	Blake Koch	Chevrolet
2	67	Logan Seavey	Toyota
3	4	Chase Cabre	Chevrolet
4	29	Kaz Grala	Chevrolet

Pos	No	Driver	Manufacturer
1	54	Kyle Weatherman	Ford
2	90	Alex Labbé	Chevrolet
3	99	Josh Bilicki	Chevrolet
4	36	Jesse Iwuji	Chevrolet

Pos	No	Driver	Manufacturer
1	33	Anthony Alfredo	Chevrolet
2	55	Will Rodgers	Chevrolet
3	7	Justin Allgaier	Chevrolet
4	45	Ty Majeski	Chevrolet

Last chance qualifying race results:

Pos	No	Driver	Manufacturer
1	19	Derek Kraus	Toyota
2	40	Ryan Truex	Chevrolet
3	68	Brandon Brown	Chevrolet
4	53	Joey Gase	Ford
5	08	Jeb Burton	Chevrolet
6	93	Myatt Snider	Chevrolet

Pos	No	Driver	Manufacturer
1	75	Landon Huffman	Chevrolet
2	27	Rubén García Jr.	Ford
3	10	Justin Haley	Chevrolet
4	20	Harrison Burton	Toyota
5	52	Stewart Friesen	Toyota
6	46	Chandler Smith	Toyota

Top ten finishers (main event):

Pos	No	Driver	Manufacturer
1	67	Logan Seavey	Toyota
2	4	Chase Cabre	Chevrolet
3	90	Alex Labbé	Chevrolet
4	33	Anthony Alfredo	Chevrolet
5	54	Kyle Weatherman	Ford
6	45	Ty Majeski	Chevrolet
7	7	Justin Allgaier	Chevrolet
8	57	Blake Koch	Chevrolet
9	53	Joey Gase	Ford
10	08	Jeb Burton	Chevrolet
Official race results

Note: Kaz Grala and Trevor Bayne both used the No. 29 in this race. On the official race results, Bayne was listed as the No. 29A to differentiate the two.

==== Main event ====
Two heat races determined the starting lineup for the main event. William Byron won heat race #1, while John Hunter Nemechek won heat race #2 in a photo finish over Ryan Preece, so they started 1–2 in the race, which they coincidentally also finished 1–2 in. This was Byron's first win in the Pro Invitational Series after having strong runs in the previous two races.

Top ten finishers:

Pos	No	Driver	Manufacturer
1	24	William Byron	Chevrolet
2	38	John Hunter Nemechek	Ford
3	66	Timmy Hill	Toyota
4	11	Denny Hamlin	Toyota
5	21	Matt DiBenedetto	Ford
6	37	Ryan Preece	Chevrolet
7	77	Parker Kligerman	Toyota
8	31	Tyler Reddick	Chevrolet
9	51	Garrett Smithley	Chevrolet
10	34	Michael McDowell	Ford
Official race results

=== Toyota Owners 150 (Richmond) ===
==== Saturday Night Thunder ====
Similar to the Bristol race, this was the undercard event of the weekend, with drivers from all NASCAR series racing in the event. After the three heat races were held, which in order were won by Landon Cassill (No. 89), Ty Majeski (No. 45), and Josh Berry (No. 88). Justin Allgaier (No. 7) would go on to win the last-chance qualifier. In the race itself, Berry won again. This was his first iRacing Pro Invitational Series start.

Top ten finishers:

Pos	No	Driver	Manufacturer
1	88	Josh Berry	Chevrolet
2	45	Ty Majeski	Chevrolet
3	4	Chase Cabre	Toyota
4	18	Ty Gibbs	Toyota
5	89	Landon Cassill	Chevrolet
6	55	Will Rodgers	Ford
7	33	Anthony Alfredo	Chevrolet
8	29	Kaz Grala	Chevrolet
9	67	Logan Seavey	Ford
10	74	Bayley Currey	Chevrolet
Official race results

==== Main event ====
Ryan Preece won the pole and led the race for 59 laps. William Byron dominated again, leading the most laps, and holding off Timmy Hill and Parker Kligerman on the last lap to win his second Pro Invitational race in a row.

Top ten finishers:

Pos	No	Driver	Manufacturer
1	24	William Byron	Chevrolet
2	66	Timmy Hill	Toyota
3	77	Parker Kligerman	Toyota
4	89	Landon Cassill	Chevrolet
5	18	Kyle Busch	Toyota
6	11	Denny Hamlin	Toyota
7	20	Erik Jones	Toyota
8	8	Dale Earnhardt Jr.	Chevrolet
9	43	Bubba Wallace	Chevrolet
10	2	Brad Keselowski	Ford
Official race results

=== Geico 70 (Talladega) ===
==== Saturday Night Thunder ====
This race saw a 51 car entry list, with two heat races determining the starting lineup, and the top 20 finishers in each heat racing in the main event for a field of 40 cars. Kyle Weatherman (No. 54) won Heat #1, which gave him the pole in the main event, and Chase Briscoe (No. 98) won Heat #2.

After multiple big ones during the race, Landon Huffman was able to win after inheriting the lead from Logan Seavey (No. 67) on the last lap after Seavey and some other cars crashed on the frontstretch.

Top ten finishers:

Pos	No	Driver	Manufacturer
1	75	Landon Huffman	Chevrolet
2	88	Josh Berry	Chevrolet
3	80	Joe Graf Jr.	Chevrolet
4	44	Tommy Joe Martins	Chevrolet
5	02	Spencer Boyd	Chevrolet
6	23	Brett Moffitt	Chevrolet
7	22	Austin Cindric	Ford
8	63	Scott Stenzel	Chevrolet
9	39	C. J. McLaughlin	Chevrolet
10	26	Tyler Ankrum	Chevrolet
Official race results

==== Main event ====
Alex Bowman won after Ty Dillon spun through the infield on the last lap from the lead. Polesitter Corey LaJoie finished second over third-place Ryan Preece in a photo finish.

Jeff Gordon competed in this race, and was involved in the big one, where his No. 24 flipped into the catchfence. After using his one reset, he was involved in another incident later in the race, which ended his chances of competing for the win as he finished nine laps down in 38th place. Clint Bowyer, who provided the sim rig Jeff was using, finished 33rd after getting caught up in a last-lap crash (he had also blown an engine while leading, having spent too long behind Bowman who was on the tail end of the lead lap at that time). The one DNF of the race was Denny Hamlin, who was booted from the race during the caution period for Jeff's second crash for a pit lane violation caused in part by his daughter turning his sim rig's screen off having gotten hold of the remote.

Top ten finishers:

Pos	No	Driver	Manufacturer
1	88	Alex Bowman	Chevrolet
2	32	Corey LaJoie	Ford
3	37	Ryan Preece	Chevrolet
4	51	Garrett Smithley	Chevrolet
5	89	Landon Cassill	Chevrolet
6	24	William Byron	Chevrolet
7	15	Brennan Poole	Chevrolet
8	18	Kyle Busch	Toyota
9	1	Kurt Busch	Chevrolet
10	96	Daniel Suárez	Toyota
Official race results

Note: William Byron and Jeff Gordon both used the No. 24 in this race. On the official race results, Gordon was listed as the No. 024 to differentiate the two.

=== Finish Line 150 (Dover) ===
==== Saturday Night Thunder ====
Like with the previous race, there were four heat races, which in numerical order, were won by Josh Berry, Anthony Alfredo, Ty Majeski, and Kaz Grala. After that, two last-chance qualifying races were held, which were won by GMS Racing teammates Sam Mayer (the first LCQ) and Brett Moffitt (the second LCQ). However, unlike the previous weeks, only the winner of each last chance qualifier advanced to the race.

This week's Saturday Night Thunder was the first to feature Elliott Sadler, who did not qualify his No. 99 into the field as he failed to finish high enough in his qualifying race and also the last chance qualifying race he was in.

Top ten finishers:

Pos	No	Driver	Manufacturer
1	33	Anthony Alfredo	Chevrolet
2	90	Alex Labbé	Chevrolet
3	04	Raphaël Lessard	Toyota
4	4	Chase Cabre	Toyota
5	75	Landon Huffman	Chevrolet
6	23	Brett Moffitt	Chevrolet
7	27	Rubén García Jr.	Ford
8	40	Ryan Truex	Chevrolet
9	29	Kaz Grala	Chevrolet
10	07	Donny Lia	Chevrolet
Official race results

Note: Raphaël Lessard and Chase Cabre both used the No. 4 in this race. However, Lessard was listed as the No. 04 on the entry list, broadcast graphics, and official results despite how his paint scheme in the race used just the No. 4 (without the zero in front of it).

==== Main event ====
Byron won his third PIS race after passing Timmy Hill for the lead during the last ten laps. Hill would finish third after Christopher Bell passed him for second. This was Bell's first top-10 finish in the series.

Regan Smith, one of Fox's pit reporters who also is a driver, participated in this race. He drove a No. 78 car which was a throwback to his time driving for the former Furniture Row Racing (then a Richard Childress Racing satellite team) team from 2009 to 2012 in the Cup Series (including a win in the 2011 Southern 500). He was involved in a crash during the race and finished 36 laps down in 31st.

Top ten finishers:

Pos	No	Driver	Manufacturer
1	24	William Byron	Chevrolet
2	95	Christopher Bell	Toyota
3	66	Timmy Hill	Toyota
4	20	Erik Jones	Toyota
5	34	Michael McDowell	Ford
6	11	Denny Hamlin	Toyota
7	12	Ryan Blaney	Ford
8	88	Alex Bowman	Chevrolet
9	51	Garrett Smithley	Chevrolet
10	10	Aric Almirola	Ford
Official race results

=== Friday Night Thunder (Martinsville) ===
It was announced on the day of the Dover race that the season finale for the Pro Invitational Series would be at North Wilkesboro Speedway, a track which is currently abandoned, and which NASCAR last raced at in 1996. The race was held on Saturday instead of Sunday so that drivers would not race on Mother's Day as is tradition in the real Cup Series schedule. For that reason, Saturday Night Thunder became Friday Night Thunder for this week only. That race was held at Martinsville, the track that weekend's real race would have been at, instead of also at North Wilkesboro.

Ty Majeski, who statistically is one of the best drivers in all of iRacing, won this race after having many strong runs in the previous races of the series. Majeski crushed the competition, leading all but one lap in the race. (The lone lap he didn't lead was led by Justin Allgaier.)

Top ten finishers:

Pos	No	Driver	Manufacturer
1	45	Ty Majeski	Chevrolet
2	90	Alex Labbé	Chevrolet
3	83	Stefan Parsons	Chevrolet
4	07	Donny Lia	Toyota
5	88	Josh Berry	Chevrolet
6	4	Chase Cabre	Toyota
7	19	Derek Kraus	Toyota
8	33	Anthony Alfredo	Chevrolet
9	9	Noah Gragson	Chevrolet
10	3	Drew Herring	Toyota
Official race results

=== North Wilkesboro 160 (North Wilkesboro) ===
It was announced on the day of the Dover race that the season finale for the Pro Invitational Series would be at North Wilkesboro Speedway, a track which is currently abandoned, and which NASCAR last raced at in 1996, as part of iRacing launching both the 1987 Ford Thunderbird and Chevrolet Monte Carlo Generation 3 cars into the game, and also the track for its servers after research and a track cleanup led by Dale Earnhardt Jr. led to a scan of the circuit that allowed it to be programmed. The race was held on Saturday instead of Sunday so that drivers would not race on Mother's Day, a longstanding tradition with the real Cup Series schedule. For that reason, Saturday Night Thunder became Friday Night Thunder for this week only.

Denny Hamlin bookended the series by winning this race. He inherited the lead from Ross Chastain after spinning him in the last few laps. Coming off a second-place finish at Dover the previous week, Christopher Bell led the most laps in this race.

This was also the first and only PIS race for Martin Truex Jr. In an interview with him during the pre-race show, Truex stated that he was not home over the long break (where his simulator was), and that was why he didn't participate in any races until this one. Bobby Labonte, who drove Truex's normal No. 19 for the whole series until this weekend, still participated in this race, driving a throwback paint scheme, his old No. 018 Interstate Batteries car.

Both RCR cars, the No. 52 and No. 53 Rick Ware cars, Dale Earnhardt Jr.'s No. 8, the Wood Brothers No. 21, as well as Timmy Hill's No. 66 also all ran throwback paint schemes to go with the throwback racetrack. The other throwback scheme was Jeff Gordon's August 2015 Bristol paint scheme, based on the one used from start of his Cup career until 2000. Gordon, the only driver representing Hendrick Motorsports for this round as the four real-life current drivers did not participate, drove in the last real-life Cup Series race at the venue in 1996, which he won. This was Gordon's second race in the PIS after his first one at Talladega. He finished 18th.

Another noteworthy participant in this race was Jon Wood, a team principal for Wood Brothers Racing who last drove in NASCAR in 2008. He substituted for Matt DiBenedetto in the No. 21, who took off for this race.

In addition to DiBenedetto, Daniel Suárez, Kurt Busch, all Hendrick Motorsports drivers, and all Team Penske drivers did not participate in this race, opting to take a week off to prepare for regular racing to resume the following Sunday with The Real Heroes 400 at Darlington Raceway.

Top ten finishers:

Pos	No	Driver	Manufacturer
1	11	Denny Hamlin	Toyota
2	66	Timmy Hill	Toyota
3	31	Tyler Reddick	Chevrolet
4	6	Ross Chastain	Ford
5	3	Austin Dillon	Chevrolet
6	51	Garrett Smithley	Chevrolet
7	15	Brennan Poole	Chevrolet
8	77	Parker Kligerman	Toyota
9	4	Kevin Harvick	Ford
10	89	Landon Cassill	Chevrolet
Official race results

Note: Kyle Busch and Bobby Labonte both used the No. 18 in this race. On the official race results, Labonte was listed as the No. 018 to differentiate the two.

== Rule changes ==
After cars were allowed two resets if they became damaged during the race at Homestead, it was decreased to only one reset allowed for the Texas race.

Not all Cup Series drivers were locked into the main event at Texas, as Joey Gase, Brennan Poole, and J. J. Yeley were placed in the qualifying race and had to attempt to race their way in.

The Saturday Night Thunder race from Bristol used gen-4 (old style) ARCA cars. This changed for the next one of those races at Richmond, where Xfinity Series cars were used.

== Media ==
It was announced that Fox, which normally carries this part of the NASCAR's racing season, would broadcast all iRacing Pro Invitational Series events, which fall in a portion of the timeslots where the actual races would have been at. Fox's booth announcers Mike Joy and Jeff Gordon broadcast from Fox's NASCAR studio in Charlotte, North Carolina (as did then-driver Clint Bowyer, who would join them full-time the following year, for the Talladega race as he provided a sim rig for Gordon), which would also serve as the broadcast headquarters for main booth commentators (who did not travel to the racetracks) when real-life competition resumed.

The Saturday Night Thunder races and the qualifying race for the race at Texas were not televised on Fox and were instead livestreamed on NASCAR's YouTube channel, and the commentators for the eNASCAR Coca-Cola iRacing Series events, play-by-play Evan Posocco, and color commentators Tim Terry and Justin Prince, served as the broadcast team for those races.

=== Television viewership ===
903,000 viewers watched the first race at Homestead, while 1,339,000 watched the second race at Texas. These races became the most-watched televised eSports broadcasts ever.

== See also ==
- 2020 NASCAR Cup Series
- 2020 NASCAR Xfinity Series
- 2020 NASCAR Gander RV & Outdoors Truck Series
- 2020 ARCA Menards Series
- 2020 ARCA Menards Series East
- 2020 ARCA Menards Series West
- 2020 NASCAR Whelen Modified Tour
- 2020 NASCAR Pinty's Series
- 2020 NASCAR Whelen Euro Series
- 2020 EuroNASCAR Esports Series
