= 2020 NASCAR Whelen Euro Series =

European auto racing season

Locations of the circuits that hosted a NASCAR Whelen Euro Series race in 2020

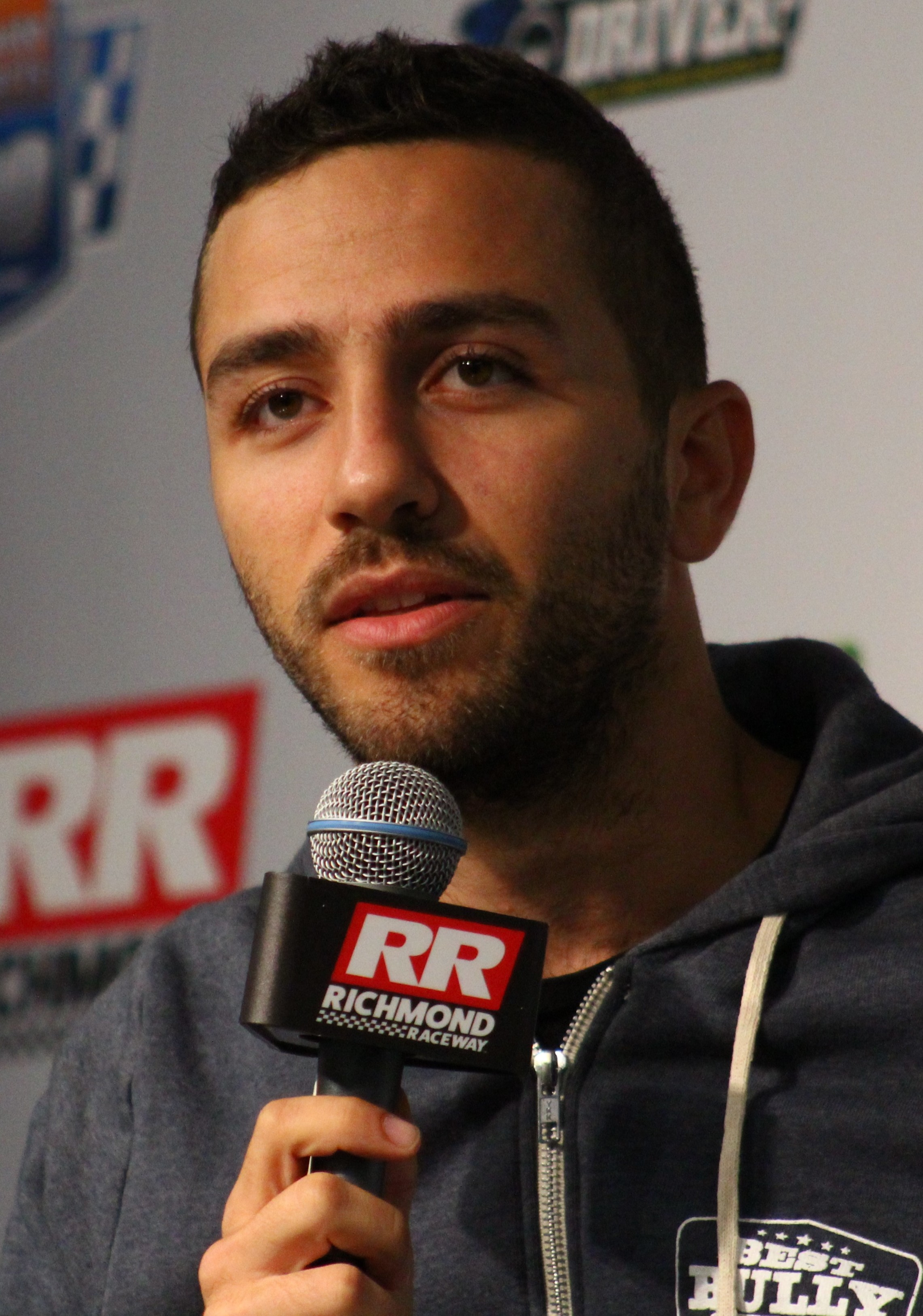
Alon Day won his third Euro Series championship title in 2020.

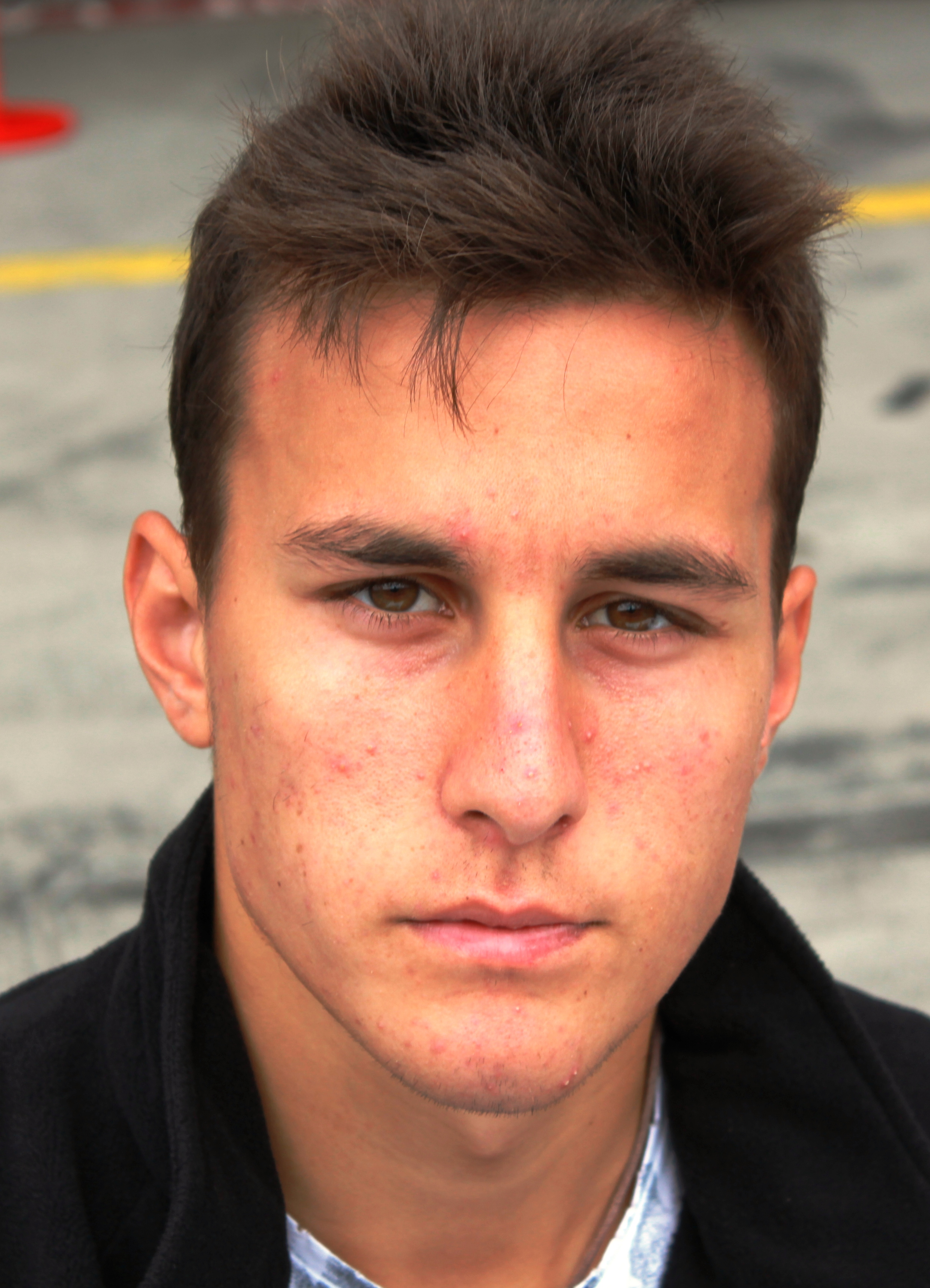
Vittorio Ghirelli (pictured in 2012) was crowned champion in the EuroNASCAR 2 division.

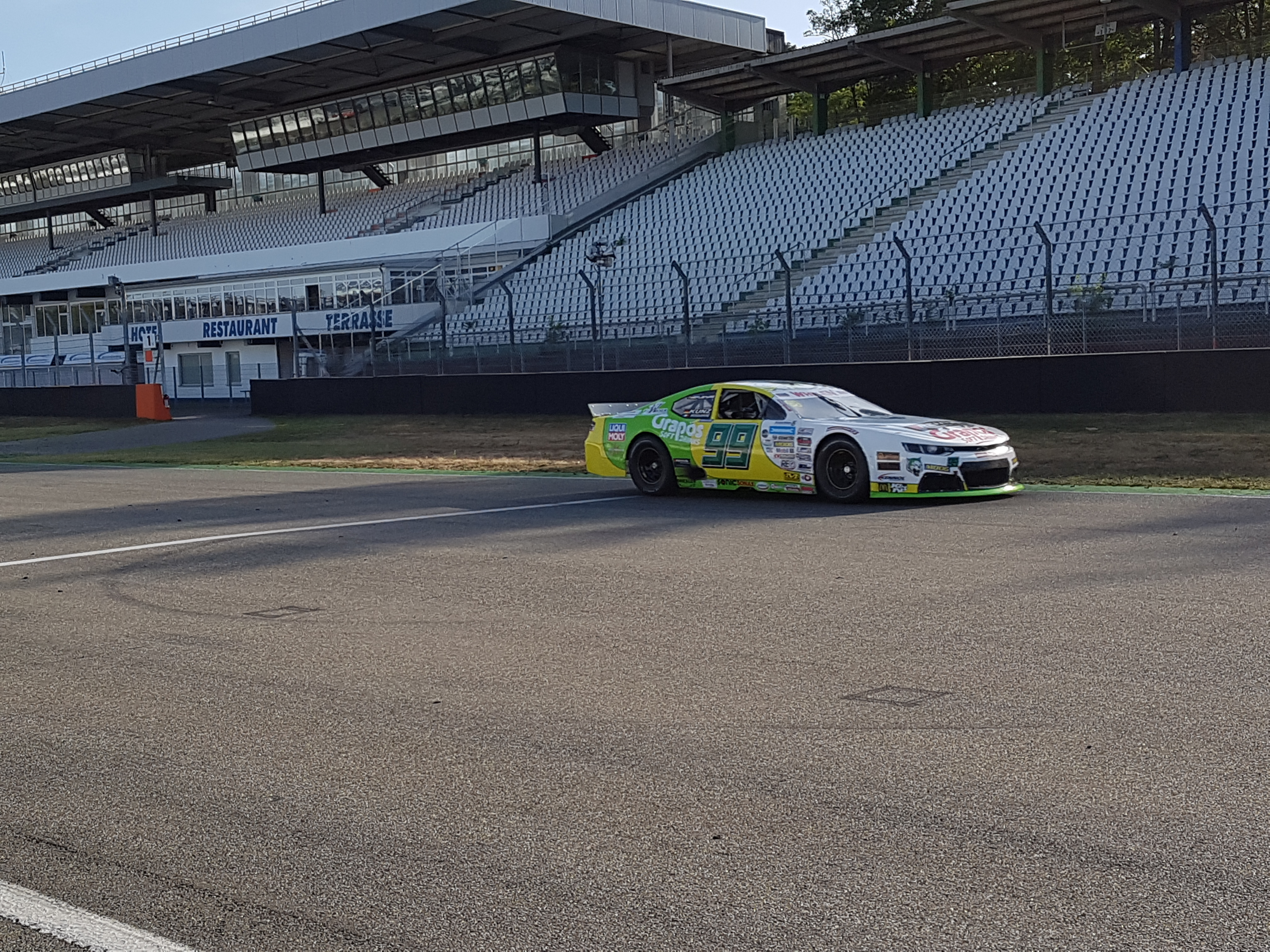
Alain Mosqueron defended his Club Challenge title in 2020.

The 2020 NASCAR Whelen Euro Series was the twelfth Racecar Euro Series season, and the eighth under the NASCAR Whelen Euro Series branding. Loris Hezemans and Lasse Sørensen entered the season as the defending champion in the EuroNASCAR PRO and EuroNASCAR 2 category respectively, although Sørensen did not defend his title as he moved up to the EuroNASCAR PRO class in 2020. Hendriks Motorsport entered the season as the defending team's champion.

Alon Day was crowned as the champion after winning 4 races and finishing all 10 races inside the Top-10. Day becomes the second three-time champion of Euro Series, tying Ander Vilariño for the most titles in history. During the course of the season, Day broke Vilariño's record for the most wins in the series when he won his 23rd career victory in the second race at Valencia. Rookie Lasse Sørensen finished second after scoring two race wins on his debut year in the EuroNASCAR PRO division, while defending champion Loris Hezemans finished third having scored two race wins. Gianmarco Ercoli and Stienes Longin were the other two race winners of 2020 after winning a single race at Vallelunga and Rijeka respectively.

In the EuroNASCAR 2 division, Hendriks Motorsport driver Vittorio Ghirelli won the title after winning 5 races and finished 9 races inside the Top-10. Series debutant and teammate Tobias Dauenhauer finished second after winning 3 races while Alessandro Brigatti finished third after scoring 4 podiums, both drivers also finished 9 races inside the Top-10. Vladimiros Tziortzis, the first Cypriot driver in NASCAR, finished fourth while Julia Landauer finished fifth. Landauer's podium finish in the third race at Valencia is the first for a female driver in Euro Series since Carole Perrin scored a third-place finish in the first Elite division race at Spa-Francorchamps in 2012. Martin Doubek was the only other race winner of the season, having swept the weekend at Zolder.

Hendriks Motorsport's No. 50 team, driven by Hezemans and Dauenhauer, successfully defended the Teams Championship title after scoring 835 points, finishing 88 points ahead of the sister No. 18 car driven Giorgio Maggi and Ghirelli. PK Carsport's No. 11 team, driven by Longin and Landauer, finished third with 713 points, 122 points behind Hendriks' No. 50 team.

== Teams and drivers ==
NASCAR Whelen Euro Series released a provisional 33-car entry list for the teams participating on 27 March 2020.

=== EuroNASCAR PRO ===
Team	No.	Body Style	Race Driver	Rounds
(Switzerland) Alex Caffi Motorsport with Race Art Tech	1	Ford Mustang	(Italy) Stefano Attianese	1
(Switzerland) Alex Caffi Motorsport with Race Art Tech	1	Ford Mustang	(Croatia) Niko Pulić	3
(Switzerland) Alex Caffi Motorsport with Race Art Tech	1	Ford Mustang	(France) Thomas Ferrando	4–5
(Italy) FEED Vict Racing	5	EuroNASCAR FJ 2020 (Note: Chevrolet SS-styled bodies are rebadged as the EuroNASCAR FJ's starting from 2020.)	(Canada) Jacques Villeneuve	1–2
(Italy) FEED Vict Racing	6	EuroNASCAR FJ 2020	(France) Patrick Lemarié	1–2, 4–5
(Italy) FEED Vict Racing	6	EuroNASCAR FJ 2020	(Belgium) Simon Pilate	3
(Italy) FEED Vict Racing	8	Chevrolet Camaro	(Italy) Dario Caso	All
(Netherlands) Hendriks Motorsport	7	Ford Mustang	(United Kingdom) Daniel Rowbottom	1
(Netherlands) Hendriks Motorsport	7	Ford Mustang	(Czech Republic) Martin Doubek	2–3
(Netherlands) Hendriks Motorsport	7	Ford Mustang	(Netherlands) Olivier Hart	4–5
(Netherlands) Hendriks Motorsport	18	Ford Mustang	(Switzerland) Giorgio Maggi	All
(Netherlands) Hendriks Motorsport	50	Ford Mustang	(Netherlands) Loris Hezemans	All
(Italy) Not Only Motorsports	10	Ford Mustang	(Italy) Alberto Panebianco	4–5
(Italy) Not Only Motorsports	89	Chevrolet Camaro	(Malta) Fabio Spatafora	1 (Note: Fabio Spatafora drove the car in Practice and Qualifying at Vallelunga before he was replaced by Davide Dallara during the race.)
(Italy) Not Only Motorsports	89	Chevrolet Camaro	(Italy) Davide Dallara	All
(Belgium) PK Carsport	11	Chevrolet Camaro	(Belgium) Stienes Longin	All
(Belgium) PK Carsport	24	Chevrolet Camaro	(Israel) Alon Day	All
(Italy) Solaris Motorsport by CAAL Racing	12	Chevrolet Camaro	(Italy) Francesco Sini	All
(Switzerland) Shadow Racing Cars by 42 Racing	17	Ford Mustang	(Italy) Bernardo Manfrè	1–2
(Switzerland) Shadow Racing Cars by 42 Racing	42	Ford Mustang	(Italy) Luigi Ferrara	1–2
(Austria) DF1 Racing	22	Chevrolet Camaro	(Italy) Nicolò Rocca	All
(Austria) DF1 Racing	66	Chevrolet Camaro	(Denmark) Lasse Sørensen	All
(Austria) DF1 Racing	99	Chevrolet Camaro	(Germany) Justin Kunz	All
(Italy) CAAL Racing	31	EuroNASCAR FJ 2020	(Switzerland) Mauro Trione	All
(Italy) CAAL Racing	54	Chevrolet Camaro	(Italy) Gianmarco Ercoli	All (Note: Gianmarco Ercoli initially entered and qualified in CAAL Racing's No. 54 team for Croatia, but due to a crash in EuroNASCAR 2 Qualifying the No. 54 car was damaged beyond repair. A deal with Mishumotors allowed Ercoli to drive the No. 70 car for the races.)
(Italy) CAAL Racing	88	EuroNASCAR FJ 2020	(France) Thomas Ferrando	1–2
(Italy) CAAL Racing	88	EuroNASCAR FJ 2020	(Slovenia) Mark Škulj	3
(Italy) CAAL Racing	98	Ford Mustang	(Belgium) Marc Goossens	All
(Germany) Mishumotors	33	EuroNASCAR FJ 2020 2 Chevrolet Camaro 3	(France) Lucas Lasserre	All
(Germany) Mishumotors	70	Chevrolet Camaro	(Italy) Gianmarco Ercoli	3
(Germany) Mishumotors	70	Chevrolet Camaro	(Germany) Mirco Schultis	5
(Germany) Marko Stipp Motorsport (Note: Car No. 46 entered as Marko Stipp Motorsport and car No. 48 entered as DF1-MSM Racing.) (Germany) DF1-MSM Racing	46	Chevrolet Camaro	(France) Wilfried Boucenna	3
(Germany) Marko Stipp Motorsport (Germany) DF1-MSM Racing	46	Chevrolet Camaro	(Ukraine) Evgeny Sokolovsky	4–5
(Germany) Marko Stipp Motorsport (Germany) DF1-MSM Racing	48	Chevrolet Camaro	(Ukraine) Evgeny Sokolovsky	1–3 (Note: Sokolovsky was initially entered in the No. 46 car for Vallelunga, but he was transferred to the No. 48 car after the No. 46 car was heavily damaged in the EuroNASCAR 2 races.)
(Germany) Marko Stipp Motorsport (Germany) DF1-MSM Racing	48	Chevrolet Camaro	(Spain) Ander Vilariño	4–5

=== EuroNASCAR 2 ===
Team	No.	Body Style	Race Driver	Rounds
(Switzerland) Alex Caffi Motorsport with Race Art Tech	1	Ford Mustang	(Cyprus) Vladimiros Tziortzis	All
(Italy) FEED Vict Racing	6	EuroNASCAR FJ 2020	(Belgium) Simon Pilate	All
(Italy) FEED Vict Racing	8	Chevrolet Camaro	(Italy) Alessandro Brigatti	All
(Netherlands) Hendriks Motorsport	7	Ford Mustang	(Czech Republic) Martin Doubek	2–5
(Netherlands) Hendriks Motorsport	18	Ford Mustang	(Italy) Vittorio Ghirelli	All
(Netherlands) Hendriks Motorsport	50	Ford Mustang	(Germany) Tobias Dauenhauer	All
(Italy) Not Only Motorsports	10	Ford Mustang	(Finland) Leevi Lintukanto	4–5
(Italy) Not Only Motorsports	89	Chevrolet Camaro	(Italy) Davide Dallara	1
(Italy) Not Only Motorsports	89	Chevrolet Camaro	(Ukraine) Igor Romanov	2–3
(Italy) Not Only Motorsports	89	Chevrolet Camaro	(Israel) Naveh Talor	4–5
(Belgium) PK Carsport	11	Chevrolet Camaro	(United States) Julia Landauer	All
(Belgium) PK Carsport	24	Chevrolet Camaro	(Belgium) Guillaume Dumarey	1–2
(Belgium) PK Carsport	43	Chevrolet Camaro	(Belgium) Pol van Pollaert	2
(Italy) Solaris Motorsport by CAAL Racing	12	Chevrolet Camaro	(Italy) Nicholas Risitano	All
(Switzerland) Shadow Racing Cars by 42 Racing	17	Ford Mustang	(Italy) Alex Ciompi	1–2
(Switzerland) Shadow Racing Cars by 42 Racing	42	Ford Mustang	(Italy) Francesco Garisto	1–2
(Austria) DF1 Racing	22	Chevrolet Camaro	(United States) Andre Castro	1–2
(Austria) DF1 Racing	22	Chevrolet Camaro	(Spain) Zihara Esteban	4–5
(Austria) DF1 Racing	66	Chevrolet Camaro	(Denmark) Andreas Jochimsen	1–2
(Austria) DF1 Racing	99	Chevrolet Camaro	(Germany) Marcel Lenerz	1
(Austria) DF1 Racing	99	Chevrolet Camaro	(Germany) Frank Riedel	3
(Austria) DF1 Racing	99	Chevrolet Camaro	(Japan) Kenko Miura	4–5
(Italy) CAAL Racing	31	EuroNASCAR FJ 2020	(Switzerland) Giovanni Trione	1, 3–5
(Italy) CAAL Racing	54	Chevrolet Camaro	(Italy) Arianna Casoli	All (Note: Arianna Casoli and Max Lanza were initially entered in the No. 54 and No. 88 entries respectively, but crashes for both drivers in Qualifying resulted in Lanza receiving a wrist injury and the No. 54 car being damaged beyond repair. Lanza's entry was subsequently withdrawn for Race 2 while Casoli raced the No. 88 car for Race 2.)
(Italy) CAAL Racing	88	EuroNASCAR FJ 2020	(Italy) Max Lanza	1–3
(Italy) CAAL Racing	88	EuroNASCAR FJ 2020	(Italy) Arianna Casoli	3
(Italy) CAAL Racing	98	Ford Mustang	(Belgium) Dylan Derdaele	All
(Germany) Mishumotors	33	EuroNASCAR FJ 2020 2 Chevrolet Camaro 2	(France) Eric Quintal	1–2, 4–5
(Germany) Mishumotors	70	Chevrolet Camaro	(Germany) Mirco Schultis	3–5
(Italy) The Club Motorsports	41	Chevrolet Camaro	(Italy) Roberto Benedetti	1
(Germany) Marko Stipp Motorsport (Germany) DF1-MSM Racing	46	Chevrolet Camaro	(Slovenia) Gašper Dernovšek	1
(Germany) Marko Stipp Motorsport (Germany) DF1-MSM Racing	46	Chevrolet Camaro	(Italy) Francesco Garisto	3
(Germany) Marko Stipp Motorsport (Germany) DF1-MSM Racing	46	Chevrolet Camaro	(Ukraine) Evgeny Sokolovsky	4–5
(Germany) Marko Stipp Motorsport (Germany) DF1-MSM Racing	48	Chevrolet Camaro	(Switzerland) Kris Richard	1
(Germany) Marko Stipp Motorsport (Germany) DF1-MSM Racing	48	Chevrolet Camaro	(Ukraine) Evgeny Sokolovsky	2–3
(Germany) Marko Stipp Motorsport (Germany) DF1-MSM Racing	48	Chevrolet Camaro	(Italy) Francesco Garisto	4–5
(France) Speedhouse	64	EuroNASCAR FJ 2020	(Germany) Matthias Hauer	2

=== EuroNASCAR Club Challenge ===
Team	No.	Body Style	Race Driver	Rounds
(Switzerland) Alex Caffi Motorsport with Race Art Tech	1	Ford Mustang	(Cyprus) Vladimiros Tziortzis	All
(Netherlands) Hendriks Motorsport	7	Ford Mustang	(Netherlands) Olivier Hart	3
(Italy) Not Only Motorsports	10	EuroNASCAR FJ 2020	(Finland) Leevi Lintukanto	3
(Italy) Not Only Motorsports	89	Chevrolet Camaro	(Italy) Federico Monti	All
(Belgium) PK Carsport	11	Chevrolet Camaro	(United States) Julia Landauer	All
(Switzerland) Shadow Racing Cars by 42 Racing	17	Ford Mustang	(Italy) Bernardo Manfrè	1
(Switzerland) Shadow Racing Cars by 42 Racing	42	Ford Mustang	(Italy) Francesco Garisto	1–2
(Austria) DF1 Racing	22	Chevrolet Camaro	(Germany) Frank Riedel	1
(Austria) DF1 Racing	22	Chevrolet Camaro	(Germany) Thomas Blumberger	2
(Austria) DF1 Racing	22	Chevrolet Camaro	(Spain) Zihara Esteban	3
(Austria) DF1 Racing	99	Chevrolet Camaro	(France) Alain Mosqueron	All
(Germany) Marko Stipp Motorsport	46	Chevrolet Camaro	(United Kingdom) Gordon Barnes	1, 3
(Germany) Marko Stipp Motorsport	46	Chevrolet Camaro	(Italy) Francesco Garisto	2
(Germany) Marko Stipp Motorsport	48	Chevrolet Camaro	(United Kingdom) Gordon Barnes	2
(Germany) Marko Stipp Motorsport	48	Chevrolet Camaro	(Italy) Francesco Garisto	3
(Germany) Mishumotors	70	Chevrolet Camaro	(Germany) Mirco Schultis	2

==== Driver changes ====
- On 25 October 2019, Ander Vilariño announced that he won't be competing with Racing Engineering in 2020. It was originally announced on 16 January 2020 that Vilariño will be switching teams to DF1 Racing for the 2020 season, but he later announced his withdrawal from the season on 26 June 2020 due to family and business concerns caused by the COVID-19 pandemic. He would be replaced by Nicolò Rocca for the 2020 season. Vilariño, however, does not rule out the possibility for a wildcard entry at Valencia and it was later announced on 1 December that he will be competing at Valencia as the driver of the No. 48 DF1-MSM Racing entry.
- On 21 November 2019, DF1 Racing announced that they will promote Justin Kunz to the EuroNASCAR PRO class in 2020. Kunz had previously competed in the then-Elite 1 class in 2018.
- On 21 November 2019, it was announced that Myatt Snider will leave the series to compete in the NASCAR Xfinity Series with Richard Childress Racing and RSS Racing, initially planning to compete part-time before committing to running the full schedule after the first eight races of the season.
- On 26 November 2019, Alessio Bacci announced on Instagram that he has signed a contract to compete with Alex Caffi Motorsport in the EuroNASCAR 2 class for 2020.
- On 12 December 2019, it was announced that Alain Mosqueron, the champion of the regularity-based EuroNASCAR Club Challenge, plans to run a part-time schedule in the EuroNASCAR 2 class with DF1 Racing for the 2020 season. He will also stay in Club Challenge to defend his title.
- On 27 December 2019, it was announced that Jacques Villeneuve, Patrick Lemarié, and Simon Pilate will be competing full-time for FEED Racing in 2020. Villeneuve will be driving the No. 5 car in the EuroNASCAR PRO class while Lemarié and Pilate will be making their Euro Series debuts in the EuroNASCAR PRO and EuroNASCAR 2 class respectively in the No. 6 team.
- On 6 January 2020, Julia Landauer announced that she will be making a move to the NASCAR Whelen Euro Series in 2020. She will be competing full-time with PK Carsport in the EuroNASCAR 2 class.
- On 20 January 2020, Igor Romanov announced that he would make his Euro Series debut in the regularity-based EuroNASCAR Club Challenge class.
- On 22 January 2020, Alon Day announced on social media that he will be leaving CAAL Racing after five years with the team. Five days later on 27 January, it was announced that Day will be switching teams to PK Carsport as the new driver for the No. 24 team, replacing Nicolò Rocca who went to DF1 to replace the withdrawing Ander Vilariño. Monster Energy will be sponsoring Day and the No. 24 team for the full season.
- On 25 January 2020, it was announced that Gianmarco Ercoli will be switching teams to CAAL Racing after five years with Racers Motorsport. Ercoli had previously competed for CAAL Racing on his debut season in 2014.
- On 30 January 2020, it was announced that Guillaume Dumarey will be returning to the series with PK Carsport after a one-year absence to compete in the GT4 European Series in 2019.
- On 30 January 2020, it was reported that Giovanni Trione will move up to the EuroNASCAR 2 class after several years of competing in Elite Club. He is scheduled to be the teammate of his father Mauro in CAAL Racing's No. 31 team.
- As a result of the merger between FEED Racing and Racers Motorsport that was announced on 30 January 2020, Dario Caso and Alessandro Brigatti will be switching teams to FEED Vict Racing for the 2020 season.
- On 3 February 2020, it was announced that Scott Jeffs was planned to move up to the EuroNASCAR PRO class full-time for the 2020 season. However, Jeffs would not race in Euro Series this year following Braxx Racing's withdrawal from the 2020 season due to the ongoing COVID-19 pandemic.
- On 4 February 2020, it was announced that Andreas Jochimsen will be making his series debut with DF1 Racing in the EuroNASCAR 2 class for 2020.
- On 8 February 2020, it was announced that Max Lanza will be switching teams to CAAL Racing, with Lanza scheduled to drive the No. 88 Chevrolet SS full-time in the EuroNASCAR 2 class.
- On 27 February 2020, it was announced that Ulysse Delsaux plans to compete in both classes with the renumbered No. 10 Chevrolet Camaro for 2020. However, on 4 September 2020, Delsaux announced his withdrawal from the 2020 season due to the ongoing COVID-19 pandemic.
- On 3 March 2020, it was announced that Marcel Lenerz, who competed in VLN in 2019, will be making his series debut as the driver of DF1 Racing's No. 99 Chevrolet Camaro in the EuroNASCAR 2 class.
- On 3 March 2020, it was announced that Tobias Dauenhauer will be making a switch from ADAC GT4 Germany to the NASCAR Whelen Euro Series in 2020. Dauenhauer is set to make his series debut as the driver of Hendriks Motorsport's No. 50 Ford Mustang in the EuroNASCAR 2 class.
- On 4 March 2020, it was announced that Sven van Laere will be competing full-time in the EuroNASCAR 2 class as the driver of Braxx Racing's No. 91 team as Marc Goossens' teammate. However, it was later announced on 21 August 2020 that such plans were cancelled because of the COVID-19 pandemic.
- On 5 March 2020, it was reported that former Formula One driver and four-time Superstars Series champion Gianni Morbidelli plans to make his debut in the series as the EuroNASCAR PRO class driver of CAAL Racing's No. 88 team. However, Morbidelli would later withdrawn his entry from the season due to the ongoing COVID-19 pandemic. This would have marked Morbidelli's return to stock car racing since the 2008–09 Speedcar Series season. Thomas Ferrando will be replacing Morbidelli as the No. 88 team's PRO class driver.
- On 6 March 2020, Hendriks Motorsport announced that Giorgio Maggi and Vittorio Ghirelli will be driving the team's newly expanded third car in 2020. Maggi will be promoted to the EuroNASCAR PRO class while Ghirelli will be staying in the EuroNASCAR 2 class to compete for the championship title.
- On 7 March 2020, Andre Castro announced that he will be switching teams to DF1 Racing for 2020. He previously competed for both PK Carsport and Marko Stipp Motorsport in 2019.
- Defending EuroNASCAR 2 champion Lasse Sørensen is scheduled to make his full-season debut in the EuroNASCAR PRO class in 2020 after he received a promotion from DF1 Racing to race the team's No. 66 Chevrolet Camaro in the PRO class.
- Henri Tuomaala will be switching teams to DF1 Racing following DF1's acquisition of the No. 23 entry from Memphis Racing.
- On 16 March 2020, it was announced that former Supersport team owner Evgeny Sokolovsky will be making a switch from Raceway Venray's Late Model V8 Oval Series to the NASCAR Whelen Euro Series in 2020. Sokolovsky will be competing for Marko Stipp Motorsport in the EuroNASCAR PRO class.
- On 16 March 2020, it was announced that Lotus Italia Cup driver Francesco Garisto will be making his series debut and compete for 42 Racing in the EuroNASCAR 2 class for 2020.
- On 27 March 2020, it was announced that Fabio Spatafora will be returning to the series after a six-year absence, while Davide Dallara will be making his series debut this year. Both drivers will be competing with Not Only Motorsports for 2020.
- On 8 April 2020, it was announced that Romain Iannetta will be leaving the series to compete for Mirage Racing in the French GT4 Cup.
- On 15 April 2020, it was announced that Kenko Miura will be switching teams from Alex Caffi Motorsport to DF1 Racing. Miura was originally scheduled to compete full-time EuroNASCAR 2 class in 2020, but travel restrictions due to the pandemic meant that he can only compete in the Valencia doubleheaders.
- On 27 April 2020, it was announced that Henri Tuomaala will be competing in both classes for the 2020 season, although his entry was later withdrawn as Tuomaala opted to compete in V8 Thunder NEZ for 2020.
- On 12 May 2020, it was announced that Cypriot driver Vladimiros Tziortzis will be making his full-time debut in the series with Alex Caffi Motorsport in the EuroNASCAR 2 class.
- On 27 July 2020, it was reported that Bernardo Manfrè will be entering the series in 2020 as part of his plans to relaunch the Shadow Racing Cars brand. Later on 13 August 2020, it was confirmed that he will be driving the No. 17 Ford Mustang for 42 Racing in the EuroNASCAR PRO class.
- On 5 August 2020, it was announced that Marko Stipp Motorsport has signed Gordon Barnes, who will be making his debut in the Club Challenge class.
- On 13 August 2020, it was announced that Luigi Ferrara will be competing with 42 Racing for the full season.
- On 21 August 2020, it was announced that Marc Goossens will be switching teams to CAAL Racing after previously planning to compete with Braxx Racing, while Dylan Derdaele will be making his full-time debut in the EuroNASCAR 2 class as Goossens' teammate. Both drivers will be competing with the No. 98 team for 2020.
- On 26 August 2020, it was announced that Nicholas Risitano will be switching teams to Solaris Motorsport after a two-year stay at Racers Motorsport.
- On 2 September 2020, Alexander Graff announced that he won't be competing in the series in 2020. Graff will be joining the Scandinavian Touring Car Championship commentary team for 2020.
- On 6 September 2020, it was reported that Frédéric Gabillon will not be competing the 2020 season due to the ongoing COVID-19 pandemic. Gabillon was initially scheduled to compete full-time in the No. 3 RDV Competition team for 2020.
- On 6 September 2020, it was announced that Gašper Dernovšek will be joining Marko Stipp Motorsport to make his series debut in the EuroNASCAR 2 class.
- On 10 September 2020, it was announced that Kris Richard will be making his debut in the series as a replacement driver for Kenko Miura in Vallelunga and Zolder.
- On 11 September 2020, it is announced that Daniel Rowbottom would make his debut in the series as the driver of Hendriks Motorsport's No. 7 car in the EuroNASCAR PRO class. Rowbottom was initially supposed to compete in British Touring Car Championship this year before he was replaced by Jack Butel days before the season started.

==== Team changes ====
- On 15 November 2019, it was announced that Alex Caffi Motorsport will form a partnership with Race Art Technology for the 2020 season. Race Art Technology previously competed in the 2018 season under the Race Art - Blue Mot banner.
- On 27 December 2019, it was announced that FEED Racing, Jacques Villeneuve and Patrick Lemarié's junior formula academy team, will be entering the series in 2020. The team initially announced that they will field the No. 5 and No. 6 teams. Later, on 30 January 2020, it was announced that FEED Racing and Racers Motorsport will merge its operations to form FEED Vict Racing and confirms that it will expand its operations into a four-car team as a result of the merger. The official entry list announcement would reveal that Racers' former No. 9 team will be renumbered to the No. 4 team for 2020.
- On 16 January 2020, it was announced that the No. 22 team, previously ran as a joint effort between Marko Stipp Motorsport and DF1 Racing in 2019, will solely be run by DF1 Racing as part of the team's expansion for the 2020 season. The team's official website would later reveal that the team will also field a fourth car in 2020 following the team's acquisition the No. 23 entry from Memphis Racing.
- On 8 February 2020, it was announced that CAAL Racing will be expanding its operations into a four-car team with the addition of the No. 88 Chevrolet SS to its roster. Later on 21 August 2020, it was announced that CAAL Racing will be renumbering the No. 27 team into the No. 98 team for 2020.
- On 12 February 2020, it was revealed through social media that RDV Competition's No. 36 team would be renumbered to the No. 10 for 2020.
- On 26 February 2020, it was announced that Solaris Motorsport has formed a technical alliance with CAAL Racing starting from the 2020 season.
- On 3 March 2020, it was revealed that Hendriks Motorsport is scheduled to expand into a three-car team in 2020 with the addition of the No. 18 Ford Mustang that will be driven by Giorgio Maggi and Vittorio Ghirelli.
- 42 Racing, who competed in a part-time schedule in 2019, is scheduled to make their full-time debut in the series in 2020. 42 Racing will be fielding the No. 17 and No. 42 teams for 2020.
- On 27 March 2020, it was announced that Italian team Not Only Motorsport will be joining the series with the No. 89 team.
- The official entry list announcement on 27 March 2020 reveals the following changes:
  - Both Mishumotors and Memphis Racing will downsize into a one-car team in 2020.
  - Marko Stipp Motorsport will be expanding into a two-car team, as the second entry that the team run in conjunction with DF1 Racing at Hockenheim last year will be competing full-time as the No. 48 team.
  - Go Fas Racing, The Club Motorsports, and Racing Engineering will be leaving the series after a two, three, and one-year stay in the series respectively, while Motorsport 98 will be leaving the series after a one-year return in 2019. The club would reverse their decision and reenter the series, while Racing Engineering left the series to compete in the European Le Mans Series for 2020.
  - Braxx Racing's No. 78 entry will be renumbered to the No. 91 in 2020.
- On 13 August 2020, it was announced that the relaunched Shadow Racing Cars brand will be entering the series as a partner of 42 Racing. The 42 Racing team was subsequently rebranded into Shadow Racing Cars with 42 Racing for 2020.
- Due to the ongoing COVID-19 pandemic, several teams opted to either withdrawn their entries or downscale their efforts for 2020:
  - On 6 September 2020, it was reported that both RDV Competition and Braxx Racing will be withdrawing all of their entries for the 2020 season due to the ongoing COVID-19 pandemic.
  - Team Bleekemolen withdrawn their single entry for Sebastiaan and Michael Bleekemolen despite initially announcing their plans to compete for the full season in 2020.
  - Memphis Racing quietly withdrawn their entries for 2020 after not making an appearance in the first three rounds of the season.
  - Alex Caffi Motorsport downscaled into a single-car team for 2020, while both DF1 Racing and FEED Vict Racing downscaled into a three-car team.

==== Mid-season changes ====
- Martin Doubek was forced to miss the American Festival of Rome at Vallelunga after he was tested positive for COVID-19 prior to the weekend. Hendriks Motorsport opted to not replace the Czech driver for Vallelunga.
- After competing in Vallelunga, Daniel Rowbottom missed the rest of the season due to travel restrictions. He was replaced by Martin Doubek at Belgium and Croatia, while Dutch sports car and historic racer Olivier Hart replaced him for Valencia.
- Evgeny Sokolovsky replaced Gašper Dernovšek after Dernovšek suffered a hand injury following a crash in the second EuroNASCAR 2 race at Vallelunga. Sokolovsky initially replaced Dernovšek for NASCAR GP Belgium, but he would replace the Slovak driver for the rest of the season.
- Kris Richard was prevented from taking part in NASCAR GP Belgium due to quarantine restrictions. Richard was initially planned to compete for Marko Stipp Motorsport in the EuroNASCAR PRO class at Zolder.
- On 6 November 2020, it was announced that three-time European Hill Climb Category I champion Niko Pulić is scheduled to be making his NASCAR debut for Alex Caffi Motorsport at Rijeka.
- After not making an appearance in the first two rounds of the season, Alessio Bacci will be making a switch to Porsche Carrera Cup Italia for the remainder of the 2020 season.
- Jacques Villeneuve missed the second half of the season due to his previous commitment as part of Canal+ Formula One broadcasting crew, as the dates for NASCAR GP Croatia and Valencia Super Speedweek clashed with the dates for the 2020 Turkish Grand Prix and 2020 Sakhir Grand Prix respectively. Teammate Patrick Lemarié also missed the third round at Rijeka due to a prior work obligation. FEED Vict elected to not replace Villeneuve, while Lemarié's EuroNASCAR 2 teammate Simon Pilate replaced him in the No. 6 car for Croatia.
- Shadow Racing Cars by 42 Racing withdrew from NASCAR GP Croatia and Valencia Super Speedweek after Shadow team members were tested positive for COVID-19 prior to the respective race weeks. Francesco Garisto moved to Marko Stipp Motorsport as a result of their withdrawal.
- Andre Castro and Andreas Jochimsen were forced to miss the second half of the season due to travel restrictions. Neither driver were replaced by the team for the races at Rijeka while Castro was replaced by Zihara Esteban for Valencia, marking her return to the series after seven years.

== Schedule ==
The provisional calendar for the 2020 season was announced on 22 October 2019. Following changes to the calendar as a result of the season's postponement due to the COVID-19 pandemic, all races of the 2020 season will be held on road courses.

=== EuroNASCAR PRO ===
Round		Race title	Track	Date
1	R1	NASCAR GP Italy - Delphix / NSR American Festival of Rome	(Italy) ACI Vallelunga Circuit, Campagnano di Roma	12 September
1	R2	NASCAR GP Italy - Delphix / NSR American Festival of Rome	(Italy) ACI Vallelunga Circuit, Campagnano di Roma	13 September
2	R3	NASCAR GP Belgium	(Belgium) Circuit Zolder, Heusden-Zolder	3 October
2	R4	NASCAR GP Belgium	(Belgium) Circuit Zolder, Heusden-Zolder	4 October
3	R5	NASCAR GP Croatia	(Croatia) Automotodrom Grobnik, Čavle	14 November
3	R6	NASCAR GP Croatia	(Croatia) Automotodrom Grobnik, Čavle	15 November
4	R7	Valencia Super Speedweek – NASCAR GP Spain	(Spain) Circuit Ricardo Tormo, Valencia	4 December
4	R8	Valencia Super Speedweek – NASCAR GP Spain	(Spain) Circuit Ricardo Tormo, Valencia	5 December
5	R9	Valencia Super Speedweek – EuroNASCAR Finals	(Spain) Circuit Ricardo Tormo, Valencia	6 December
5	R10	Valencia Super Speedweek – EuroNASCAR Finals	(Spain) Circuit Ricardo Tormo, Valencia	6 December

=== EuroNASCAR 2 ===
Round		Race title	Track	Date
1	R1	NASCAR GP Italy - Delphix / NSR American Festival of Rome	(Italy) ACI Vallelunga Circuit, Campagnano di Roma	12 September
1	R2	NASCAR GP Italy - Delphix / NSR American Festival of Rome	(Italy) ACI Vallelunga Circuit, Campagnano di Roma	13 September
2	R3	NASCAR GP Belgium	(Belgium) Circuit Zolder, Heusden-Zolder	3 October
2	R4	NASCAR GP Belgium	(Belgium) Circuit Zolder, Heusden-Zolder	4 October
3	R5	NASCAR GP Croatia	(Croatia) Automotodrom Grobnik, Čavle	14 November
3	R6	NASCAR GP Croatia	(Croatia) Automotodrom Grobnik, Čavle	15 November
4	R7	Valencia Super Speedweek – NASCAR GP Spain	(Spain) Circuit Ricardo Tormo, Valencia	4 December
4	R8	Valencia Super Speedweek – NASCAR GP Spain	(Spain) Circuit Ricardo Tormo, Valencia	4 December
5	R9	Valencia Super Speedweek – EuroNASCAR Finals	(Spain) Circuit Ricardo Tormo, Valencia	5 December
5	R10	Valencia Super Speedweek – EuroNASCAR Finals	(Spain) Circuit Ricardo Tormo, Valencia	6 December

=== EuroNASCAR Club Challenge ===
Round	Race title	Track	Date
1	NASCAR GP Belgium – Club Challenge Belgium Race	(Belgium) Circuit Zolder, Heusden-Zolder	1 October
2	NASCAR GP Croatia – Club Challenge Race	(Croatia) Automotodrom Grobnik, Čavle	13 November
3	NASCAR GP Spain – Club Challenge Spain Race	(Spain) Circuit Ricardo Tormo, Valencia	3 December

=== Calendar changes ===
- On October 16, 2019, NASCAR Whelen Euro Series announced that NASCAR GP Italy will move to ACI Vallelunga Circuit, ending the series' three-year stay at Autodromo di Franciacorta. Vallelunga also moves back to September as the fifth round of the season, with Brands Hatch, Most, and Venray moving one spot ahead as a result.
- The NASCAR GP Germany at Hockenheim and NASCAR GP Belgium at Zolder swapped places, with Zolder now hosting the sixth round while Hockenheim is scheduled to host the season-finale round for the first time.
- The double-points Playoffs will be extended from the last two rounds of the season to the last three rounds of the season.

=== Calendar changes due to the COVID-19 pandemic ===
- On 12 March 2020, NASCAR Whelen Euro Series announced that they will postpone the Valencia NASCAR Fest due to the COVID-19 pandemic. Valencia is originally rescheduled to 31 October-1 November but it was later rescheduled to 5–6 December in the revised calendar.
- After Motorsport UK announced on 24 March 2020 that they will extend the suspension of any motor racing activities in United Kingdom until 30 June due to the pandemic, NASCAR Whelen Euro Series announced that the American Speedfest VIII at Brands Hatch, originally scheduled to be held on 6–7 June, will be postponed.
- On 16 May 2020, Euro Series President Jérôme Galpin states in an interview with AUTOhebdo that the 2020 season will be starting in early September, with 5 of the 7 scheduled rounds are confirmed to be staying in the revised calendar.
- On 19 May 2020, NASCAR Whelen Euro Series announced that the OMV MaxxMotion NASCAR Show at Autodrom Most will be postponed until 14–15 November. On the same announcement, it's also announced that the round at Venray will be postponed while the rounds at Vallelunga, Zolder, and Hockenheim will be keeping their original dates in the revised calendar.
- On 12 June 2020, NASCAR Whelen Euro Series announced the following revisions for the 2020 season calendar:
  - The NASCAR GP Netherlands at Raceway Venray has been cancelled, leaving the series with 12 races in 6 rounds as opposed to the scheduled 13 races in 7 rounds.
  - The Valencia NASCAR Fest at Circuit Ricardo Tormo will be rescheduled to 5–6 December as the scheduled final round of the season.
  - The American Speedfest at Brands Hatch will be keeping its slot in the revised calendar, although a date for the round has not been determined yet.
- On 23 July 2020, it was announced that the American Speedfest round at Brands Hatch will be cancelled, leaving the series with 10 races in 5 rounds for the 2020 season.
- On 24 August 2020, it was announced that the 2020 edition of the American Fan Fest at Hockenheim has been cancelled. A second round at Valencia, titled NASCAR GP de la Comunitat Valenciana, is scheduled to replace Hockenheim in the revised calendar as part of the Valencia Super Speedweek doubleheader round. The Valencia NASCAR Fest round, renamed EuroNASCAR Finals Spain for 2020, will award double points. The names for both rounds were subsequently retitled into NASCAR GP Spain and EuroNASCAR Finals during the Super Speedweek itself.
- On 23 October 2020, it was announced that the 2020 edition of OMV MaxxMotion NASCAR Show at Most has been cancelled due to recent COVID-19 restrictions. A new round at Croatia's Automotodrom Grobnik, titled NASCAR GP Croatia, will replace Most in the revised calendar.

== Rule changes ==
- All classes will be rebranded starting from the 2020 season, with the Elite 1, Elite 2, and the regularity-based Elite Club classes are set to be renamed as EuroNASCAR PRO, EuroNASCAR 2, and EuroNASCAR Club Challenge respectively.
- Teams are required to use only a set of tires per driver for an entire race weekend, with two of the tires used must be reused in the next event.
- The allocation of 20 tires per driver will be extended to include tires used in practice sessions.

=== Changes due to the COVID-19 pandemic ===
- On 1 September 2020, NASCAR Whelen Euro Series announced the following changes to the sporting regulations:
  - All race results will count to the final championship standings. Previously, drivers can drop their worst result from the non-playoff races from their final points tally.
  - A race weekend can be held with two possible formats: The traditional three-day format or a compact two-day format. The two-day format will see all EuroNASCAR 2 class activities being held on Saturday, while all EuroNASCAR PRO class activities are going to be held on Sunday. Vallelunga will use the compact format, while Zolder will be using the traditional format. The race week format used for the remaining three rounds are currently unknown.
  - Teams must bring a limited number of personnel for each car they are fielding.
  - All briefings will be held online and remotely via a digital platform.
  - Each round's safety procedures will be adjusted based on each local situation and regulations, with the safety procedures used are going to be announced before each round.

== Results ==
=== EuroNASCAR PRO ===
Round		Race	Pole position	Fastest lap	Most laps led	Winning driver	Winning manufacturer
1	R1	Delphix / NSR American Festival of Rome	(Netherlands) Loris Hezemans	(Denmark) Lasse Sørensen	(Canada) Jacques Villeneuve	(Netherlands) Loris Hezemans	Ford
1	R2	Delphix / NSR American Festival of Rome	(Denmark) Lasse Sørensen	(United Kingdom) Daniel Rowbottom	(Italy) Gianmarco Ercoli	(Italy) Gianmarco Ercoli	Chevrolet
2	R3	NASCAR GP Belgium	(Denmark) Lasse Sørensen	(Belgium) Stienes Longin	(Denmark) Lasse Sørensen	(Denmark) Lasse Sørensen	Chevrolet
2	R4	NASCAR GP Belgium	(Belgium) Stienes Longin	(Israel) Alon Day	(Israel) Alon Day	(Israel) Alon Day	Chevrolet
3	R5	NASCAR GP Croatia	(Switzerland) Giorgio Maggi	(Israel) Alon Day	(Belgium) Stienes Longin	(Belgium) Stienes Longin	Chevrolet
3	R6	NASCAR GP Croatia	(Israel) Alon Day	(Israel) Alon Day	(Israel) Alon Day	(Israel) Alon Day	Chevrolet
4	R7	NASCAR GP Spain	(Israel) Alon Day	(Israel) Alon Day	(Belgium) Stienes Longin	(Denmark) Lasse Sørensen	Chevrolet
4	R8	NASCAR GP Spain	(Israel) Alon Day	(Israel) Alon Day	(Belgium) Stienes Longin	(Israel) Alon Day	Chevrolet
5	R9	EuroNASCAR Finals	(Israel) Alon Day	(Israel) Alon Day	(Israel) Alon Day	(Israel) Alon Day	Chevrolet
5	R10	EuroNASCAR Finals	(Israel) Alon Day	(Netherlands) Loris Hezemans	(Netherlands) Loris Hezemans	(Netherlands) Loris Hezemans	Ford

=== EuroNASCAR 2 ===
Round		Race	Pole position	Fastest lap	Most laps led	Winning driver	Winning manufacturer
1	R1	Delphix / NSR American Festival of Rome	(Germany) Tobias Dauenhauer	(Germany) Tobias Dauenhauer	(Germany) Tobias Dauenhauer	(Germany) Tobias Dauenhauer	Ford
1	R2	Delphix / NSR American Festival of Rome	(Germany) Tobias Dauenhauer	(Germany) Tobias Dauenhauer	(Germany) Tobias Dauenhauer	(Germany) Tobias Dauenhauer	Ford
2	R3	NASCAR GP Belgium	(Czech Republic) Martin Doubek	(Czech Republic) Martin Doubek	(Czech Republic) Martin Doubek	(Czech Republic) Martin Doubek	Ford
2	R4	NASCAR GP Belgium	(Czech Republic) Martin Doubek	(Czech Republic) Martin Doubek	(Czech Republic) Martin Doubek	(Czech Republic) Martin Doubek	Ford
3	R5	NASCAR GP Croatia	(Italy) Vittorio Ghirelli	(Italy) Vittorio Ghirelli	(Italy) Vittorio Ghirelli	(Italy) Vittorio Ghirelli	Ford
3	R6	NASCAR GP Croatia	(Italy) Vittorio Ghirelli	(Italy) Vittorio Ghirelli	(Italy) Vittorio Ghirelli	(Italy) Vittorio Ghirelli	Ford
4	R7	NASCAR GP Spain	(Italy) Vittorio Ghirelli	(Italy) Vittorio Ghirelli	(Italy) Vittorio Ghirelli	(Italy) Vittorio Ghirelli	Ford
4	R8	NASCAR GP Spain	(Italy) Vittorio Ghirelli	(Germany) Tobias Dauenhauer	(Italy) Vittorio Ghirelli	(Italy) Vittorio Ghirelli	Ford
5	R9	EuroNASCAR Finals	(Germany) Tobias Dauenhauer	(Germany) Tobias Dauenhauer	(Germany) Tobias Dauenhauer	(Germany) Tobias Dauenhauer	Ford
5	R10	EuroNASCAR Finals	(Germany) Tobias Dauenhauer	(Italy) Vittorio Ghirelli	(Italy) Vittorio Ghirelli	(Italy) Vittorio Ghirelli	Ford

== Standings ==
Points are awarded to drivers and team using the current point system used in Monster Energy NASCAR Cup Series, NASCAR Xfinity Series, and NASCAR Gander Outdoors Truck Series, excluding the Stage and Race Winner bonus points. For the final round at Valencia, double points are awarded. In addition, the driver that gained the most positions in a race will receive bonus championship points.

=== EuroNASCAR PRO ===
(key) Bold - Pole position awarded by fastest qualifying time (in Race 1) or by previous race's fastest lap (in Race 2). Italics - Fastest lap. * – Most laps led. ^ – Most positions gained.

Pos	Driver	(Italy) ITA		(Belgium) BEL		(Croatia) CRO		(Spain) ESP1		(Spain) ESP2		Points
1	(Israel) Alon Day	2	4	3	1*	5	**1***	**6**	**1**	**1***	**4**	431
2	(Denmark) Lasse Sørensen	6^	**5**	**1***	12	3	3	1	6	2	2	411
3	(Netherlands) Loris Hezemans	**1**	6	19	5	4	2	2	3	12	1*	390
4	(France) Lucas Lasserre	4	3	14	14	9	20	3	9	3^	7	356
5	(Belgium) Marc Goossens	22	11^	2	3	7	5	4	7	5	17	352
6	(Italy) Gianmarco Ercoli	3	1*	5	2	12^	5	5	5	4	20	350
7	(Italy) Francesco Sini	7	7	7	8	20	11	16	10	10	5	342
8	(Belgium) Stienes Longin	5	9	11	**4**	1*	8	18*	2*	20	13	334
9	(Italy) Nicolò Rocca	8	8	8	DNS^{2}	10	13	15	4	15	3	317
10	(Germany) Justin Kunz	21	DNS^{1}	13	10^	8	6	7	14	7	12	306
11	(Switzerland) Giorgio Maggi	15	12	16	18	**2**	17	8	12	6	19	303
12	(Italy) Davide Dallara	10	DNS	12	9	13	11	9	20	9	8^	297
13	(Switzerland) Mauro Trione	14	18	15^	13	16	9^	11	18	19	18	279
14	(Ukraine) Evgeny Sokolovsky	13	16	17	15	18	14	14	17	14	11	278
15	(Italy) Dario Caso	12	13	18	11	15	16	12^	13	11	14	275
16	(France) Thomas Ferrando	19	20	6	6			DNS	8^	16	6	247
17	(France) Patrick Lemarié	11	10	20	16			17	16	13	9	242
18	(Netherlands) Olivier Hart							10	11	8	16	153
19	(Spain) Ander Vilariño							19	19	15	17	120
20	(Czech Republic) Martin Doubek			9	7	6	18					108
21	(Canada) Jacques Villeneuve	16*	2	4	19							104
22	(Italy) Alberto Panebianco							13	15	18	DNS	98
23	(Italy) Luigi Ferrara	9	15	10	17							97
24	(Italy) Bernardo Manfrè	20	14	21	DNS^{2}							65
25	(Belgium) Simon Pilate					13	7					54
26	(Slovenia) Mark Škulj					19	10					45
27	(France) Wilfried Boucenna					17	15					42
28	(Croatia) Niko Pulić					14	19					41
29	(Italy) Stefano Attianese	18	17									39
30	(United Kingdom) Daniel Rowbottom	17	19									20
	(Malta) Fabio Spatafora	QL	QL									0
Drivers ineligible for EuroNASCAR PRO points
	(Germany) Mirco Schultis									DNS	10	

Notes

- ^{1} – Justin Kunz received 7 championship points despite being a non-starter.
- ^{2} – Nicolò Rocca and Bernardo Manfrè received 6 and 8 championship points respectively despite being a non-starter.

=== EuroNASCAR 2 ===
(key) Bold - Pole position awarded by fastest qualifying time (in Race 1) or by previous race's fastest lap (in Race 2). Italics - Fastest lap. * – Most laps led. ^ – Most positions gained.

Pos	Driver	(Italy) ITA		(Belgium) BEL		(Croatia) CRO		(Spain) ESP1		(Spain) ESP2		Points
1	(Italy) Vittorio Ghirelli	2	4	7	2	**1***	**1***	**1***	**1***	16	1*	419
2	(Germany) Tobias Dauenhauer	**1***	**1***	10	13	2	3	4	3	**1***	**4**	413
3	(Italy) Alessandro Brigatti	3	2	2	11	6	9	6	2	8	5	379
4	(Cyprus) Vladimiros Tziortzis	8	7	9	10	15	4	5	15	2	3	365
5	(United States) Julia Landauer	11	15	5	19	7	6	8	5^	3^	10	358
6	(Italy) Nicholas Risitano	5	3	3	14	3	10	3	19	5	2	350
7	(Czech Republic) Martin Doubek			**1***	**1***	4^	2^	2	4	19	8^	336
8	(Belgium) Simon Pilate	20	18	19	7	8	7	18	6	4	6	323
9	(Italy) Francesco Garisto	16	DNS^{1}	6	3	9	8	10^	17	10	11	320
10	(Belgium) Dylan Derdaele	18	16	16	6	5	5	10	8	9	19	318
11	(Italy) Arianna Casoli	13	11	15	5	DNS^{4}	16	14	14	12	14	293
12	(Switzerland) Giovanni Trione	7^	12			10	11	19	13	11	18	261
13	(Ukraine) Evgeny Sokolovsky			13	8	12	12	13	11	15	12	260
14	(France) Eric Quintal	12	13	14	9			12	18	13	15	250
15	(Germany) Mirco Schultis					11	13	16	16	7	17	209
16	(Japan) Kenko Miura							9	9	6	13	152
17	(Spain) Zihara Esteban							15	12	16	14	133
18	(Finland) Leevi Lintukanto							11	10	17	9	131
19	(Israel) Naveh Talor							17	7	18	7	130
20	(Italy) Max Lanza	10	10	12	18	DNS^{4}	Wth					110
21	(Belgium) Guillaume Dumarey	19	9^	4	16							104
22	(Denmark) Andreas Jochimsen	17	5	11	17							98
23	(Ukraine) Igor Romanov			18	12	14	15					89
24	(United States) Andre Castro	14	17	DNS^{2}	4^							88
25	(Italy) Alex Ciompi	4	6	DNS^{2}	DNS^{3}							79
26	(Italy) Davide Dallara	9	8									57
27	(Belgium) Pol van Pollaert			8^	15							55
28	(Switzerland) Kris Richard	6	14									54
29	(Germany) Frank Riedel					13	14					47
30	(Germany) Matthias Hauer			17	20							37
31	(Slovenia) Gašper Dernovšek	15	DNS^{1}									31
32	(Germany) Marcel Lenerz	DNS^{1}	Wth									9
	(Italy) Roberto Benedetti	PO	PO									0

Notes

- ^{1} – Gašper Dernovšek, Francesco Garisto, and Marcel Lenerz received 9 championship points despite being a non-starter.
- ^{2} – Andre Castro and Alex Ciompi received 8 championship points despite being a non-starter.
- ^{3} – Alex Ciompi received 7 championship points despite being a non-starter.
- ^{4} – Arianna Casoli and Max Lanza received 12 championship points despite being a non-starter.

=== EuroNASCAR Club Challenge ===
Pos	Driver	(Belgium) BEL	(Croatia) CRO	(Spain) ESP	Points
1	(France) Alain Mosqueron	2	1	1	224
2	(Italy) Federico Monti	1	2	2	220
3	(United Kingdom) Gordon Barnes	3	3	3	210
4	(Germany) Frank Riedel	4			66
5	(Germany) Thomas Blumberger		4		66
	(Cyprus) Vladimiros Tziortzis				
	(Netherlands) Olivier Hart				
	(Finland) Leevi Lintukanto				
	(United States) Julia Landauer				
	(Italy) Bernardo Manfrè				
	(Italy) Francesco Garisto				
	(Spain) Zihara Esteban				
	(Germany) Mirco Schultis				

=== Team's Championship (Top 15) ===
Pos	No.	Team	EuroNASCAR PRO Driver(s)	EuroNASCAR 2 Driver(s)	Points
1	50	(Netherlands) Hendriks Motorsport	(Netherlands) Loris Hezemans	(Germany) Tobias Dauenhauer	835
2	18	(Netherlands) Hendriks Motorsport	(Switzerland) Giorgio Maggi	(Italy) Vittorio Ghirelli	747
3	11	(Belgium) PK Carsport	(Belgium) Stienes Longin	(United States) Julia Landauer	713
4	12	(Italy) Solaris Motorsport	(Italy) Francesco Sini	(Italy) Nicholas Risitano	705
5	8	(Italy) FEED Vict Racing	(Italy) Dario Caso	(Italy) Alessandro Brigatti	685
6	6	(Italy) FEED Vict Racing	(France) Patrick Lemarié (Belgium) Simon Pilate	(Belgium) Simon Pilate	642
7	98	(Italy) CAAL Racing	(Belgium) Marc Goossens	(Belgium) Dylan Derdaele	640
8	7	(Netherlands) Hendriks Motorsport	(United Kingdom) Daniel Rowbottom (Czech Republic) Martin Doubek (Netherlands) Olivier Hart	(Czech Republic) Martin Doubek	638
9	1	(Switzerland) Alex Caffi Motorsport with Race Art Tech	(Italy) Stefano Attianese (Croatia) Niko Pulić (France) Thomas Ferrando	(Cyprus) Vladimiros Tziortzis	610
10	33	(Germany) Mishumotors	(France) Lucas Lasserre	(France) Eric Quintal	607
11	48	(Germany) Marko Stipp Motorsport (Germany) DF1-MSM Racing	(Ukraine) Evgeny Sokolovsky (Spain) Ander Vilariño	(Switzerland) Kris Richard (Ukraine) Evgeny Sokolovsky (Italy) Francesco Garisto	583
12	89	(Italy) Not Only Motorsport	(Malta) Fabio Spatafora (Italy) Davide Dallara	(Italy) Davide Dallara (Ukraine) Igor Romanov (Israel) Naveh Talor	570
13	24	(Belgium) PK Carsport	(Israel) Alon Day	(Belgium) Guillaume Dumarey	569
14	22	(Austria) DF1 Racing	(Italy) Nicolò Rocca	(United States) Andre Castro (Spain) Zihara Esteban	563
15	54	(Italy) CAAL Racing	(Italy) Gianmarco Ercoli	(Italy) Arianna Casoli	531
Pos	No.	Team	EuroNASCAR PRO Driver(s)	EuroNASCAR 2 Driver(s)	Points

== See also ==
- 2020 NASCAR Cup Series
- 2020 NASCAR Xfinity Series
- 2020 NASCAR Gander RV & Outdoors Truck Series
- 2020 ARCA Menards Series
- 2020 ARCA Menards Series East
- 2020 ARCA Menards Series West
- 2020 NASCAR Whelen Modified Tour
- 2020 NASCAR Pinty's Series
- 2020 eNASCAR iRacing Pro Invitational Series
- 2020 EuroNASCAR Esports Series
