= 2020 EuroNASCAR Esports Series =

Esports racing competition

The 2020 EuroNASCAR Esports Series was the inaugural season of the EuroNASCAR Esports Series. The series was launched after the opening rounds of the 2020 NASCAR Whelen Euro Series were postponed due to the COVID-19 pandemic. This esports racing championship used the iRacing platform with drivers racing NASCAR Cup Series machinery.

== Format ==
The series used a heat racing system. After a 2-lap qualifying session, two 10-minute Heat Races would each send the top 15 drivers to the Main Event. Those left out from the Heat Races would have one last opportunity to find their way to the final through the 10-min Last Chance Qualifier, which would award six transfer positions. The Main Event Race would be 30 minutes long and award ENES championship points using the NWES points system.

== Entry list ==
Team	No.	Race Driver	Rounds
RDV Competition	3	(France) Frederic Gabillon	1-2
RDV Competition	10	(France) Ulysse Delsaux	0, 1-2
RDV Competition	210	(Belgium) Guillaume Deflandre	1-2
RDV Competition	310	(France) Aurelien Dilliere	1-2
PK Carsport	11	(Belgium) Stienes Longin	0
PK Carsport	24	(Israel) Alon Day	0, 1-2
PK Carsport	11	(United States) Julia Landauer	
PK Carsport	311	(Belgium) Bavo Follon	0, 1-2
DF1 Racing	22	(Spain) Ander Vilarino	0, 1
DF1 Racing	23	(Finland) Henri Tuomaala	0, 1-2
DF1 Racing	48	(Finland) Santtu Vuoksenturja	2
DF1 Racing	66	(Denmark) Lasse Sørensen	1-2
DF1 Racing	99	(Germany) Justin Kunz	0, 1-2
DF1 Racing	122	(United States) Andre Castro	0, 1-2
DF1 Racing	166	(Denmark) Andreas Jochimsen	1-2
DF1 Racing	199	(Germany) Marcel Lenerz	0, 1-2
DF1 Racing	299	(France) Alain Mosqueron	0, 1-2
CAAL Racing	27	(France) Thomas Ferrando	0, 1-2
CAAL Racing	31	(India) Advait Deodhar	0, 1-2
CAAL Racing	54	(Italy) Gianmarco Ercoli	1
CAAL Racing	88	(Italy) Gianni Morbidelli	1
CAAL Racing	154	(Italy) Arianna Casoli	0, 1-2
CAAL Racing	188	(Italy) Massimiliano Lanza	0, 1-2
CAAL Racing	354	(Italy) Luca Canneori	0, 1-2
CAAL Racing	388	(Italy) Stefano Guastaveglie	0, 1-2
Mishumotors	33	(United Kingdom) Ben Creanor	0, 1-2
Mishumotors	70	(United States) Eric Filgueiras	0, 1-2
The Club Motorsports	41	(Italy) Fabrizio Armetta	1-2
The Club Motorsports	141	(Italy) Lorenzo Marcucci	1-2
42 Racing	17	(Italy) Bernardo Manfré	
42 Racing	42	(Italy) Luigi Ferrara	0, 1-2
42 Racing	117	(Italy) Alex Ciompi	
42 Racing	142	(Italy) Francesco Garisto	0, 1-2
42 Racing	342	(Italy) Alex Fontana	0, 1-2
Marko Stipp Motorsport	146	(Slovenia) Gasper Dernovsek	1-2
Marko Stipp Motorsport	46	(Ukraine) Evgeny Sokolovsky	0, 1-2
Marko Stipp Motorsport	246	(United Kingdom) Gordon Barnes	1-2
Hendriks Motorsport	18	(Switzerland) Giorgio Maggi	0, 1-2
Hendriks Motorsport	50	(Netherlands) Loris Hezemans	0, 1-2
Hendriks Motorsport	118	(Italy) Vittorio Ghirelli	0, 1-2
Hendriks Motorsport	150	(Germany) Tobias Dauenhauer	0, 1-2
Hendriks Motorsport	307	(Netherlands) Jeffrey Roeffen	0, 1-2
Hendriks Motorsport	318	(Netherlands) Roy Hendriks	0, 1-2
Team Bleekemolen	69	(Netherlands) Sebastiaan Bleekemolen	0, 1-2
Memphis Racing	77	(Sweden) Alexander Graff	0, 1-2
Memphis Racing	277	(Sweden) Gustav Berggren	1-2
Braxx Racing	78	(United Kingdom) Alex Sedgwick	0, 1-2
Braxx Racing	90	(United Kingdom) Scott Jeffs	0, 1-2
Braxx Racing	91	(Switzerland) Kris Richard	2
Braxx Racing	191	(Belgium) Sven van Laere	0, 1-2
Braxx Racing	278	(Belgium) Michiel Haverans	
Braxx Racing	378	(Belgium) Bryan Crauwels	0, 1-2
Fan Fest Motorsport	79	(Germany) Stefan Kresin	0
OMV Maxxmotion NASCAR Show	83	(Czech Republic) Jakub Krafek	0, 2
Autodrom Most NASCAR	3	(Czech Republic) Michal Fronek	1
Autodrom Most NASCAR	17	(Czech Republic) Michal Smidl	2
Not Only Motorsport	89	(Italy) Fabio Spatafora	
Not Only Motorsport	189	(Italy) Davide Dallara	0, 1-2
Not Only Motorsport	289	(Ukraine) Igor Romanov	0, 1
Not Only Motorsport	389	(Italy) Riccardo Alitta	0, 2
Not Only Motorsport	389	(Italy) Richard Busher	
Alex Caffi Motorsport	2	(Italy) Nicola Baldan	2
Alex Caffi Motorsport	101	(Cyprus) Vladimiros Tziortzis	0, 1-2
Alex Caffi Motorsport	102	(Italy) Alessio Bacci	0, 1
Alex Caffi Motorsport	202	(Italy) Federico Monti	
Feed Vict Racing	5	(Canada) Jacques Villeneuve	1
Feed Vict Racing	6	(France) Patrick Lemarie	
Feed Vict Racing	105	(Netherlands) Marijn Kremers	0, 1-2
Feed Vict Racing	106	(Belgium) Simon Pilate	0, 1-2
Feed Vict Racing	108	(Italy) Alessandro Brigati	0, 1-2
Feed Vict Racing	208	(Italy) Leonardo Colavita	1-2
Feed Vict Racing	208	(Italy) Simone Laureti	2
Solaris Motorsport	112	(Israel) Naveh Talor	0, 1-2
Solaris Motorsport	312	(Italy) Massimiliano Palumbo	2
Team Fordzilla Valencia NASCAR	727	(Spain) Iker Lecuona	0, 2
Team Fordzilla Valencia NASCAR	25	(Spain) Jose Iglesias	1
All Star Team	32	(France) Romain Iannetta	0, 1
All Star Team	423	(United States) Brett Moffitt	2
All Star Team	888	(Mexico) Rubén García Jr.	0, 1-2
Hockenheimring American Fan Fest	479	(Germany) Philipp Bereswil	2
Las Vegas Exotics Racing	499	(France) Romain Thievin	2
Privateer	79	(Germany) Michael Niemas	1

== Calendar and results ==
Round	Track	Date	Heat 1 winner	Heat 2 winner	Heat 3 winner	Last chance winner	Final winner
(0)	(United States) Daytona International Speedway (Road Course)	21 April	(Israel) Alon Day	(United States) Andre Castro	(Netherlands) Jeffrey Roeffen	(Italy) Davide Dallara	(United States) Andre Castro
1	(United Kingdom) Brands Hatch (Indy)	28 April	(Israel) Alon Day	(United States) Andre Castro	(Netherlands) Jeffrey Roeffen	(Denmark) Lasse Sørensen	(Belgium) Guillaume Deflandre
2	(United States) Watkins Glen International	5 May	(Czech Republic) Michal Šmídl	(Netherlands) Jeffrey Roeffen	(Belgium) Guillaume Deflandre	(Germany) Justin Kunz	(Czech Republic) Michal Šmídl
3	(Netherlands) Circuit Zandvoort	12 May					
4	(United States) Indianapolis Motor Speedway (Road Course)	19 May					
5	(United Kingdom) Brands Hatch (Grand Prix)	26 May					
6	(United States) Charlotte Motor Speedway (Roval)	2 June					
7	(Belgium) Circuit Zolder	9 June					

== See also ==
- 2020 NASCAR Cup Series
- 2020 NASCAR Xfinity Series
- 2020 NASCAR Gander RV & Outdoors Truck Series
- 2020 ARCA Menards Series
- 2020 ARCA Menards Series East
- 2020 ARCA Menards Series West
- 2020 NASCAR Whelen Modified Tour
- 2020 NASCAR Pinty's Series
- 2020 NASCAR Whelen Euro Series
- eNASCAR iRacing Pro Invitational Series
