= 2020 NASCAR Pinty's FanCave Challenge =

NASCAR Pinty's Series season

The 2020 NASCAR Pinty's FanCave Challenge was the fourteenth season of the Pinty's Series, the national stock car racing series in Canada sanctioned by NASCAR. It began with the QwickWick 125 at Sunset Speedway on August 15 and concluded with the Pinty's 125 at Jukasa Motor Speedway on September 28.

Andrew Ranger entered the season as the defending drivers' champion, however he did not compete in any races. Jason Hathaway won the championship, finishing 14 points ahead of Kevin Lacroix.

== Teams and drivers ==
=== Complete schedule ===
Manufacturer	Team	No.	Race Driver	Crew Chief
Chevrolet	Team 3 Red/Ed Hakonson Racing	3	Jason Hathaway	Craig Masters
Chevrolet	Team 3 Red/Ed Hakonson Racing	33	Brett Taylor	Howie Scannell Jr.
Chevrolet	Team 3 Red/Ed Hakonson Racing	92	Dexter Stacey	Bud Roy
Chevrolet	Wight Motorsports	80	Donald Theetge	David Wight
Chevrolet	22 Racing	18	Treyten Lapcevich (R) 2	Tyler Case
Chevrolet	22 Racing	18	Alex Tagliani 4	Tyler Case
Dodge	DJK Racing	17	D. J. Kennington	Rick Verbern
Dodge	DJK Racing	28	Jason White 4	Doug Devine
Dodge	DJK Racing	28	Kenny Forth 2	Doug Devine
Dodge	Dumoulin Compétition	47	Louis-Philippe Dumoulin	Robin McCluskey
Dodge	Lacroix Motorsport	74	Kevin Lacroix	Adam Marchitto
Dodge	Larry Jackson Racing 2 Jim Bray Motorsports 4	98	Larry Jackson 4	David Stephens
Dodge	Larry Jackson Racing 2 Jim Bray Motorsports 4	98	Todd Cresswell (R) 2	David Stephens
Ford	Team 3 Red/Ed Hakonson Racing	8	Connor James (R)	Jamie Wagar

=== Limited schedule ===
Manufacturer	Car Owner	No.	Race Driver	Crew Chief	Round(s)
Chevrolet	22 Racing	24	J. R. Fitzpatrick	Greg Gibson	4
Dodge	Canada's Best Racing Team	1	Anthony Simone	Joey McColm	5
Dodge	Lacroix Motorsport	75	Mathieu Kingsbury (R)	Jean-Pierre Cyr	4
Dodge	Larry Jackson Racing	84	Larry Jackson	Unknown	2
Ford	Jacombs Racing	32	Cole Powell	Ron Easton	2

== Schedule ==
On 5 December 2019, NASCAR announced the 2020 schedule. It included an inaugural race at Ohsweken Speedway, which would have become the first dirt track race in series history. The COVID-19 pandemic caused the series to make considerable schedule and format changes. The season was ultimately contested over three weekends at three different tracks, with each track holding 125 lap doubleheader races.

No.	Race title	Track	Date
1	QwickWick 125	Sunset Speedway, Innisfil	15 August
2	Canadian Tire 125	Sunset Speedway, Innisfil	15 August
3	Pinty's 125	Flamboro Speedway, Millgrove	29 August
4	PartyCasino 125	Flamboro Speedway, Millgrove	29 August
5	Motomaster 125	Jukasa Motor Speedway, Cayuga	12 September
6	Pinty's 125	Jukasa Motor Speedway, Cayuga	12 September

== Results and standings ==
=== Races ===
No.	Race	Pole position	Most laps led	Winning driver	Manufacturer
1	QwickWick 125	D. J. Kennington	Jason Hathaway	Louis-Philippe Dumoulin	Dodge
2	Canadian Tire 125	Brett Taylor	Jason Hathaway	Jason Hathaway	Chevrolet
3	Pinty's 125	Jason Hathaway	Jason Hathaway	Jason Hathaway	Chevrolet
4	PartyCasino 125	D. J. Kennington	Kevin Lacroix	Kevin Lacroix	Dodge
5	Motomaster 125	Brett Taylor	Jason Hathaway	Jason Hathaway	Chevrolet
6	Pinty's 125	D. J. Kennington	D. J. Kennington	D. J. Kennington	Chevrolet

=== Drivers' championship ===
(key) Bold – Pole position awarded by time. Italics – Pole position set by final practice results or Owners' points. * – Most laps led.

Pos.	Driver	SUN	SUN	FLA	FLA	JUK	JUK	Points
1	Jason Hathaway	9*	1*	1*	2	1*	3	265
2	Kevin Lacroix	8	3	2	1*	2	4	251
3	D. J. Kennington	4	6	5	4	4	1*	247
4	Louis-Philippe Dumoulin	1	13	7	5	3	9	231
5	Donald Theetge	6	5	8	12	8	2	225
6	Brett Taylor	3	10	3	7	7	14	222
7	Larry Jackson	7	12	10	10	6	7	212
8	Connor James **(R)**	10	2	12	8	11	10	211
9	Dexter Stacey	11	9	11	11	10	8	204
10	Anthony Simone	13	7	13		9	13	165
11	J. R. Fitzpatrick			6	3	5	11	151
12	Alex Tagliani			4	6	14	5	147
13	Jason White	12	8			12	6	138
14	Mathieu Kingsbury **(R)**	5	11			13	16	131
15	Treyten Lapcevich **(R)**	2	4					83
16	Kenny Forth			9	9			70
17	Cole Powell					15	12	61
18	Todd Cresswell **(R)**					16	15	57

== See also ==
- 2020 NASCAR Cup Series
- 2020 NASCAR Xfinity Series
- 2020 NASCAR Gander RV & Outdoors Truck Series
- 2020 ARCA Menards Series
- 2020 ARCA Menards Series East
- 2020 ARCA Menards Series West
- 2020 NASCAR Whelen Modified Tour
- 2020 NASCAR Whelen Euro Series
- 2020 eNASCAR iRacing Pro Invitational Series
- 2020 EuroNASCAR Esports Series
