= Yevgen Sokolovsky =

Ukrainian racing driver

Evgeny Sokolovsky
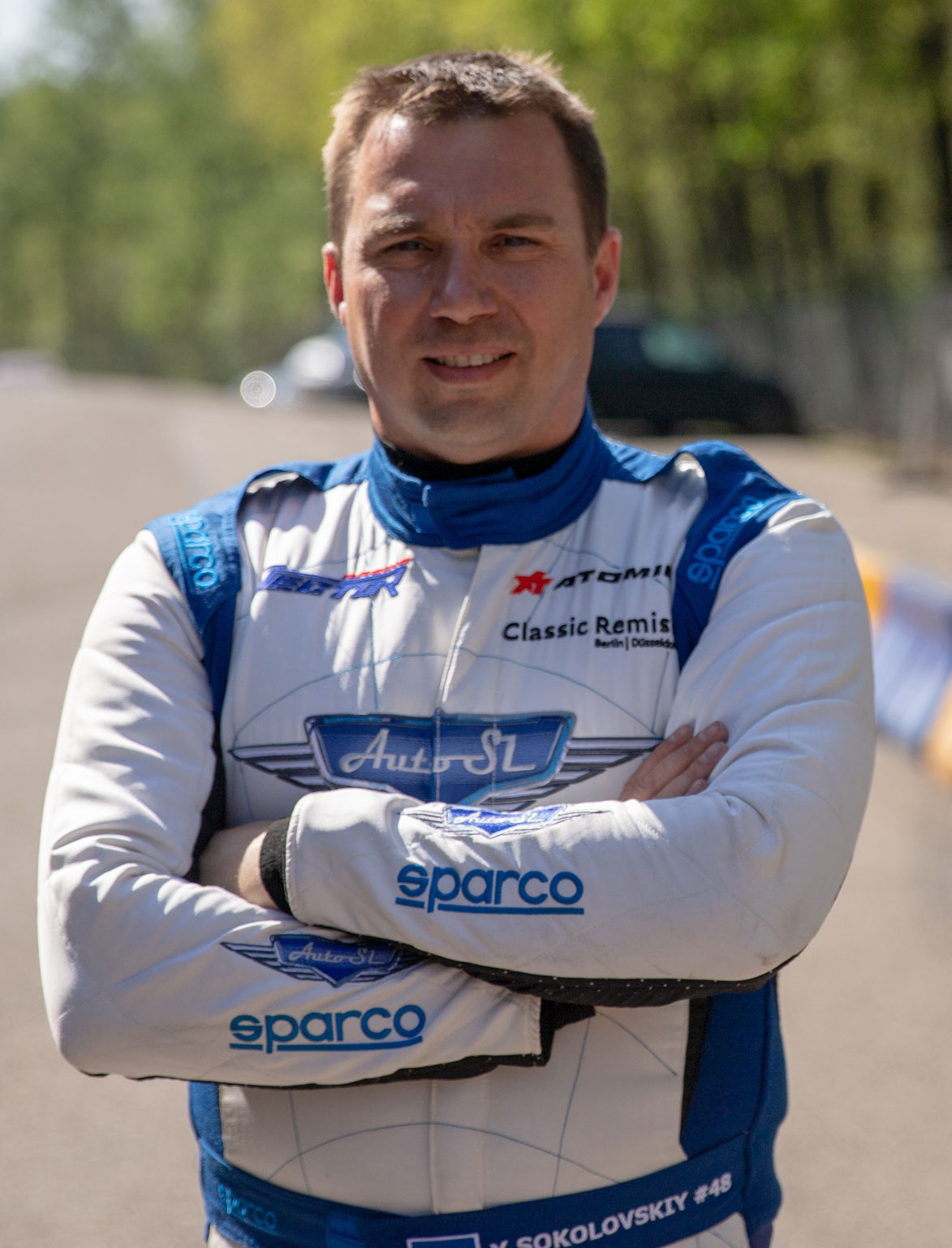
- Nationality: Ukrainian
- Born: 7 November 1978 (age 48) Odesa, Ukrainian SSR (Soviet Union)
- Categorisation: FIA Bronze

Evgeny "Zhenya" Vladimirovich Sokolovsky, also known as Yevgen Volodymyrovych Sokolovskiy (Ukrainian: Євген Володимирович Соколовський, born 7 November 1978 in Odesa), is a Ukrainian racing driver, team manager and businessman. In 2021, Sokolovsky won the Belgian touring car championship Belcar Endurance.

Sokolovsky is owner and manager of MotoGP/IDM team Vector Racing, who wins 2011 the Internationale Deutsche Motorradmeisterschaft in the 600cc Supersport class. He himself drove in the "Vector 24-7 GP Racing" team until 2012, when he changed to touring car racing after a break in 2018 and started in the NASCAR Whelen Euro Series in 2020.

== Early years ==
Sokolovsky grew up in the Ukrainian SSR in Odesa. He came to motorsport very early through his father, the Ukrainian rally driver Wladmir Sokolovsky, and started in junior races at the age of eight.

From 1995 to 2000, Sokolovsky studied at the Odesa National Economics University (now part of the Odesa National Polytechnic University) and graduated with a master's degree (Dyplom Magistra) as a commercial IT specialist.

== Motorcycle racing ==
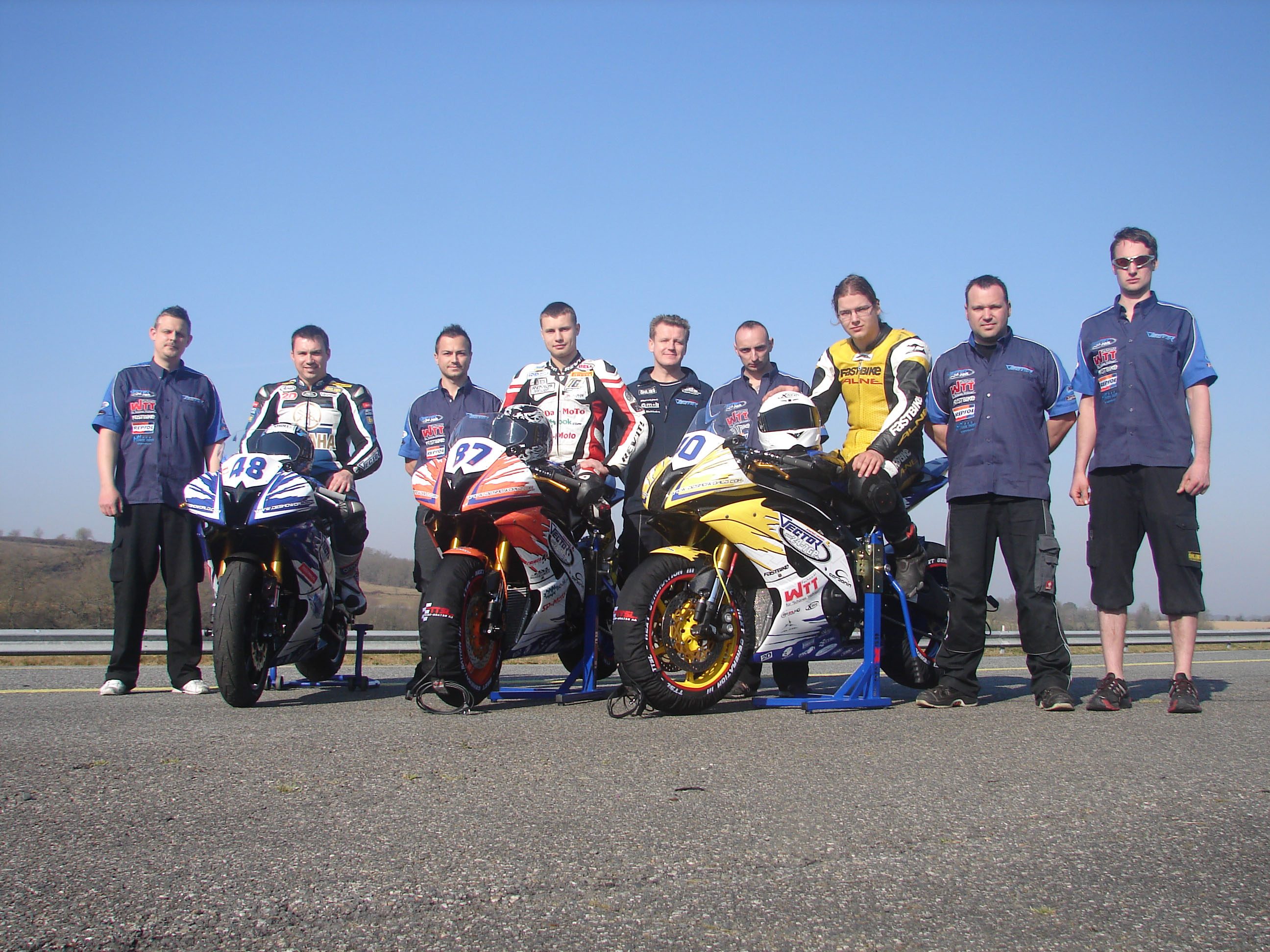
2012, Team Vector 24-7 GP, Thomas Helldobler, Konstantyn Pisarev and Sokolovkiy.

From 2003 to 2009, Sokolovsky drove in the Supersport 600 in national championships in Russia and Ukraine.

From 2009 to 2011, Sokolovsky started in the German Yamaha R6 Cup. In 2011, missions in the WorldSBK and in the German DMV circuit racing championship were added. During the 2011 IDM final run at the Hockenheimring he crashed hard.

In the 2012 season, Sokolovsky started again in the IDM Suppersport and WorldSBK UEM Coppa dei Due Paesi Trophy, but ended his two-wheeler career at the end of the season.

== Team owner and manager ==
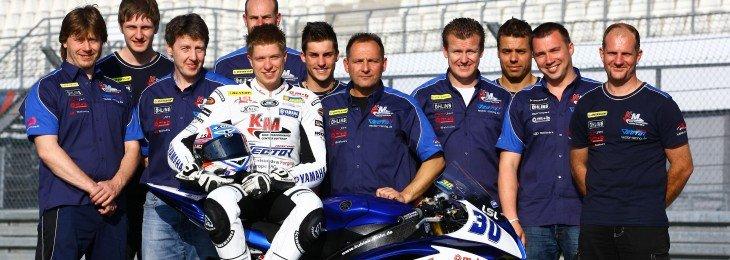
Team Vector Racing with IDM champion 2011 Jesco Günther and team manager Sokolovsky.

As team owner, Sokolovsky led the motorcycle racing team Vector Racing together with team manager Andrey Gavrilov.

Since 2001, the team has participated in various different championships, up to European and world championship races. In 2006, the team then entered the World SBK Motorcycle World Championship. In 2008, Vladimir Ivanov took second place in the IDM Supersport on a Yamaha YZF-R6 for his team.

In 2009, Vector Racing started their season with Vladimir Leonov in the MotoGP up to 250cc and in 2010 additionally started in the newly created Moto-2 class.

In the 2011 season, Vector Racing returned to the IDM and won the International German Motorcycle Championship (IDM) with the driver Jesco Günther in the Supersport class.

After the successful 2011 season, Vector Racing Team decided to launch two teams, each with two drivers, for 2012 in the IDM Supersport: Vector Bily KM Racing and Vector 24-7 GP Racing. However, the team could no longer build on the successes of previous years.

== Touring car racing ==
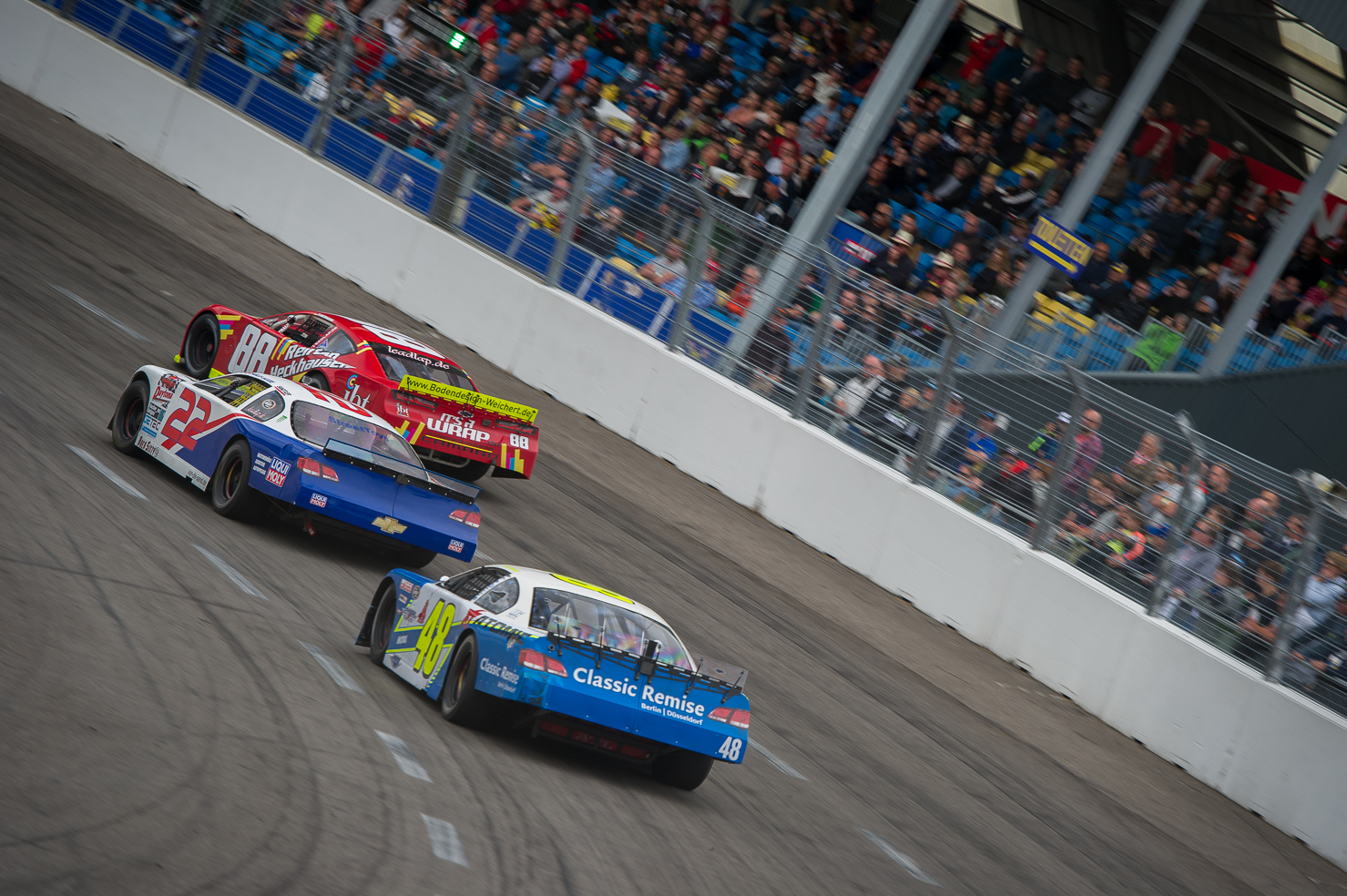
Start V8LM-Series at Raceway Venray with the start number 48.

After a break as an active driver, Sokolovsky switched to touring car racing in 2018. He entered the European oval racing series LMV8 (Late Model V8) and achieved second place in the ASCAR class in his debut year.

In 2019, Sokolovsky switched to a new vehicle in the LMV8-NASCAR class and managed to improve after getting used to it. In the final race, Sokolovsky was involved in a high-speed crash and the emergency vehicle was completely destroyed, Sokolovsky could be recovered from the vehicle unharmed.

In 2020, Sokolovsky started for Marko Stipp Motorsport in the EuroNASCAR Pro class of the NASCAR Whelen Euro Series and in the Challenger Trophy.

Because of the coronavirus pandemic, the races of the NASCAR Whelen Euro Series were suspended in March 2020 and the EuroNASCAR Esports Series was established. Results of the virtual series will also have impact on the real-life championship. Sokolovsky started in the esports championship as well with his team Marko Stipp Motorsport.

Since the second event in 2020, Sokolovsky has also started permanently in the NASCAR 2 class.

In 2021, the Belgian Touring Car Championship, the Belcar Endurance Championship, was added to EuroNASCAR. Here, Sokolovsky became Belgian champions with Joël Uylenbroeck and former Belgian cycling champion Jurgen Van Den Broeck on the TCR-Audi RS3 LMS with Team QSR-Racing.

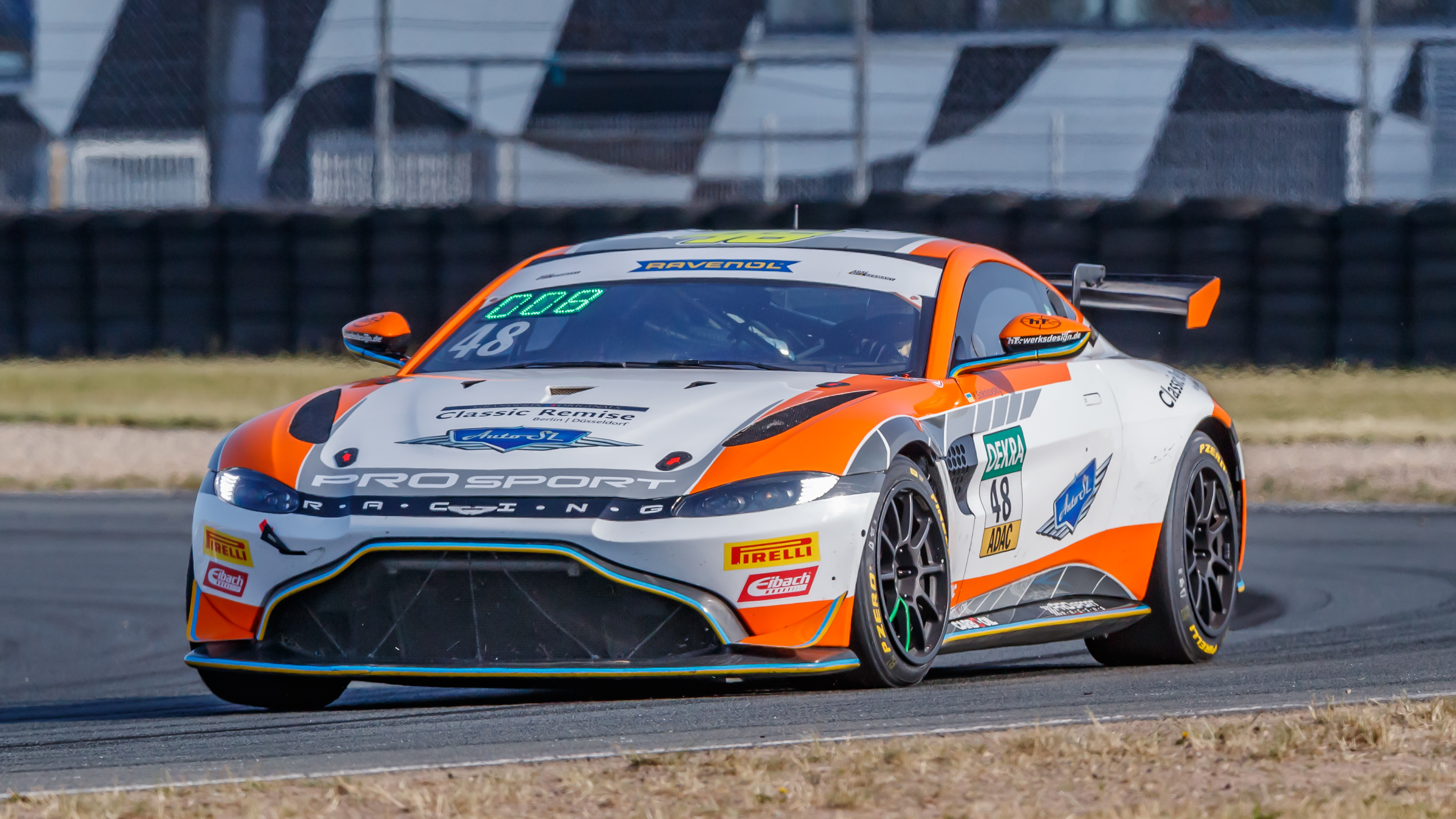
Sokolovskiy competing in the 2023 ADAC GT4 Germany Oschersleben round.

For October 2022, Sokolovsky and Ivan Pelkin are confirmed by the Ukrainian national team for the GT-Classes of the 2022 FIA Motorsport Games.

== Racing record ==
=== LMV8-Series ===
Season	Team	Class	Race (all Raceway Venray)									Points	Position	
Season	Team	Class	1	2	3	4	5	6	7	8	9	Points	Class	Total
2018	Vektor Racing	ASCAR	3	4	4	4	4	5	4			675	2	11
2019	Vector Racing	ASCAR	2									831	10	12
2019	Vector Racing	Off Set		12	13	10	6	7	10	DNF		831	10	12
2020	Vector Racing	Off Set	9	COVID-19 pandemic season break										
2021	Vector Racing	Off Set	Unknown results										9	13

=== EuroNASCAR ===
==== EuroNASCAR Pro ====
Season	Team	Race												Points	Position
Season	Team	R1	R2	R3	R4	R5	R6	R7	R8	R9	R10	R11	R12	Points	Position
2020	Marko Stipp Motorsport	Italy		Belgium		Croatia		Spain		Spain				278	14
2020	Marko Stipp Motorsport	13	16	17	15	19	14	14	17	14	11			278	14
2021	Marko Stipp Motorsport	Spain		United Kingdom		Czech Republic		Croatia		Belgium		Italy		271	12
2021	Marko Stipp Motorsport	16	15	16	18	15	14	15	15	18	16	14	16	271	12

==== EuroNASCAR 2 ====
Season	Team	Race												Points	Position
Season	Team	R1	R2	R3	R4	R5	R6	R7	R8	R9	R10	R11	R12	Points	Position
2020	Marko Stipp Motorsport	Italy		Belgium		Croatia		Spain		Spain				260	13
2020	Marko Stipp Motorsport	DNS	DNS	13	8	12	12	13	11	15	12			260	13
2021	Marko Stipp Motorsport	Spain		United Kingdom		Czech Republic		Croatia		Belgium		Italy		303	14
2021	Marko Stipp Motorsport	10	10	12	15	8	17	12	15	11	10	17	12	303	14

==== EuroNASCAR eSports Series ====
Season	Team	Race					Points	Position
Season	Team	R1	R2	R3	R4	R5	Points	Position
2020	Marko Stipp Motorsport	detailed results unknown					69	35
2021	Marko Stipp Motorsport	11	13	19	17	32	92	21

=== Belcar Endurance Championship: Touring Car Division ===
Season	Team	Class	Race						Points	Position
Season	Team	Class	1	2	3	4	5	6	Points	Position
2021	QSR Racing	TCR	Belgium	Germany	Belgium	Belgium	Belgium	Belgium	177,5	1
2021	QSR Racing	TCR	1	1	3	3	7	2	177,5	1

== Personal life ==
Sokolovsky is married and lives in Düsseldorf, Germany.

As the managing partner, Sokolovsky heads the AutoSL dealerships in Neuss and in the Classic Remise Düsseldorf.
