= Alain Mosqueron =

French racing driver

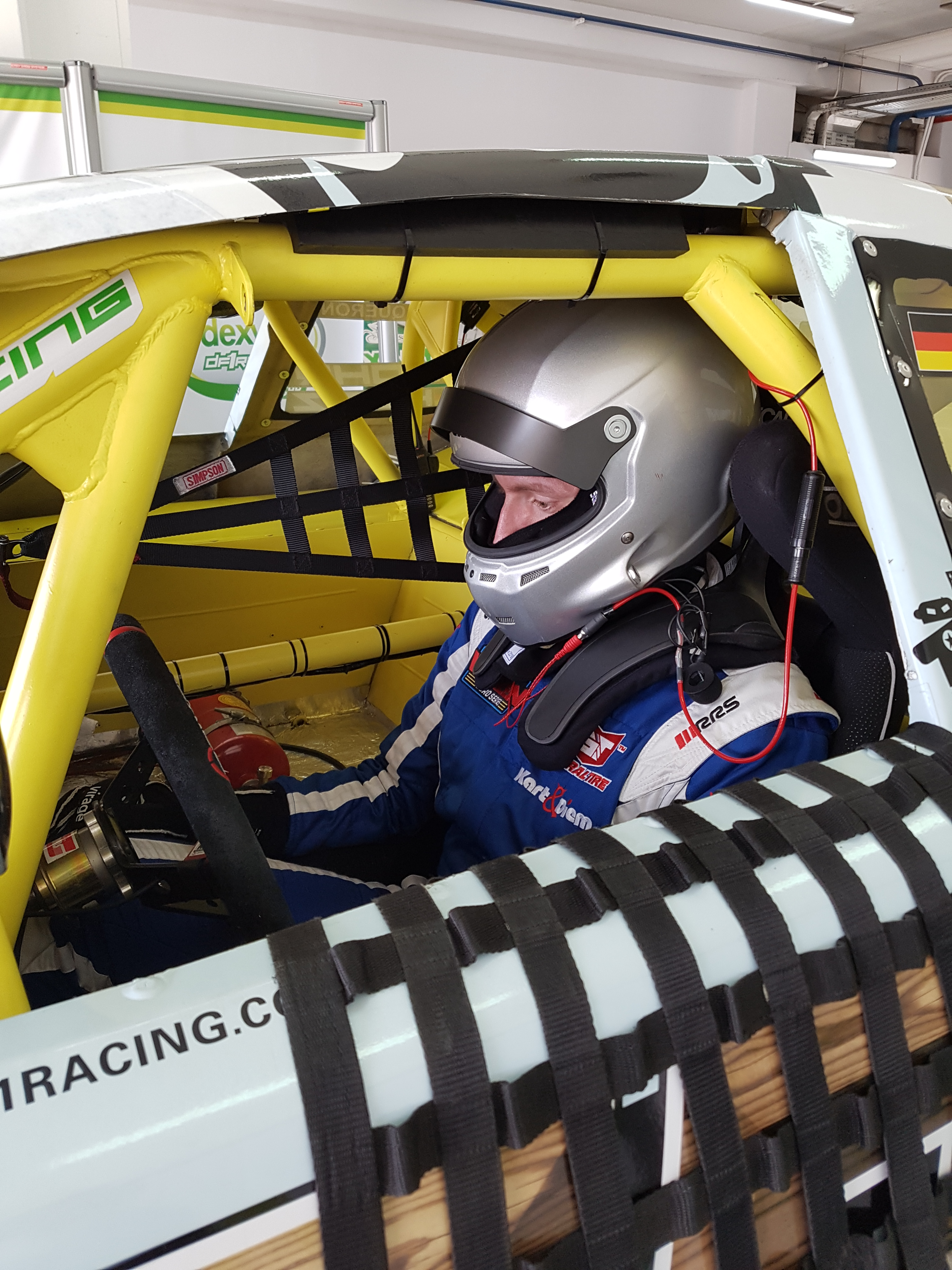
- Mosqueron ready to race at Valencia in 2019
- Nationality: (France) French
- Born: 31 January 1992 (age 34) Cherbourg-en-Cotentin, France

NASCAR Whelen Euro Series career
- Debut season: 2019
- Current team: (Austria) DF1 Racing
- Car number: 99
- Starts: 8 (Club Challenge)
- Championships: 2 (2019 & 2020 Club Challenge)
- Wins: 3 (Elite Club)
- Best finish: 1st in 2019 & 2020 (Club Challenge)

Championship titles
- 2019 & 2020: NASCAR Whelen Euro Series – Club Challenge

Alain Mosqueron (born 31 January 1992 in Cherbourg-en-Cotentin) is a French racing driver who currently competes in the NASCAR Whelen Euro Series, driving the No. 99 Chevrolet Camaro for DF1 Racing in the EuroNASCAR Club Challenge class. He is a two-time champion in the Euro Series, having won the Club Challenge championship in 2019 & 2020.

== Racing career ==
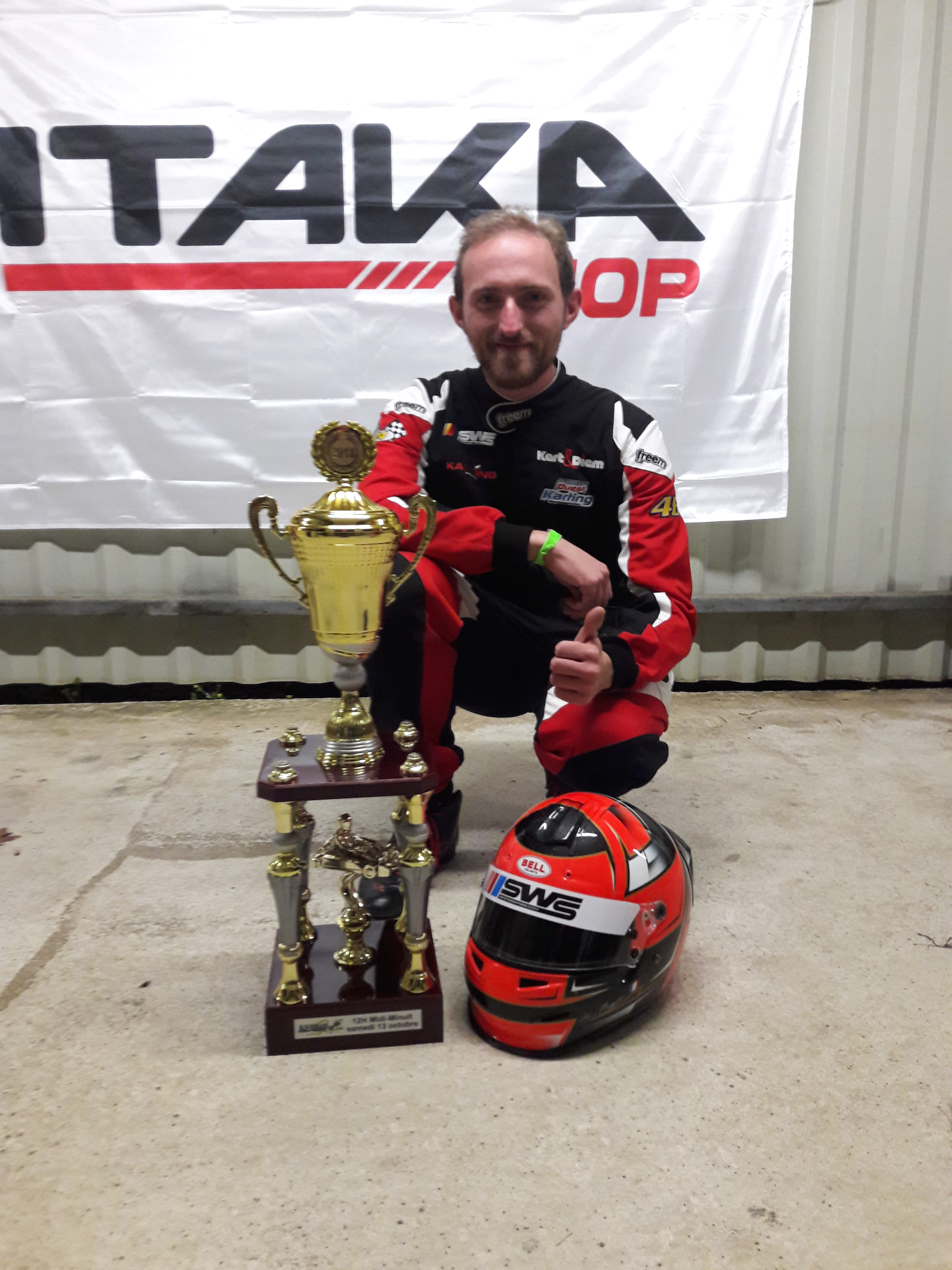
Alain Mosqueron during the 12 Hours of Dunois with Kart&Diem

=== Kart Racing ===
Alain Mosqueron made his kart racing debut in 2014 in the Sodi World Series championship. Mosqueron was selected in 2016 to participate to his first individual world final at the Racing Kart Cormeilles in 2017 in Paris where he finished 43rd.

In 2017, Mosqueron joined the Kart & Diem team in a full-time schedule. He was crowned the French Champion and Vice World Champion in the Sodi World Series championship.

In 2018, Mosqueron continued its collaboration with the Kart & Diem team and was crowned Vice Champion of France and third in the world rankings of the Sodi World Series championship.

Since 2019, Mosqueron has continued its collaboration with the Kart & Diem team on a few key endurance events during the year.

=== NASCAR Whelen Euro Series ===
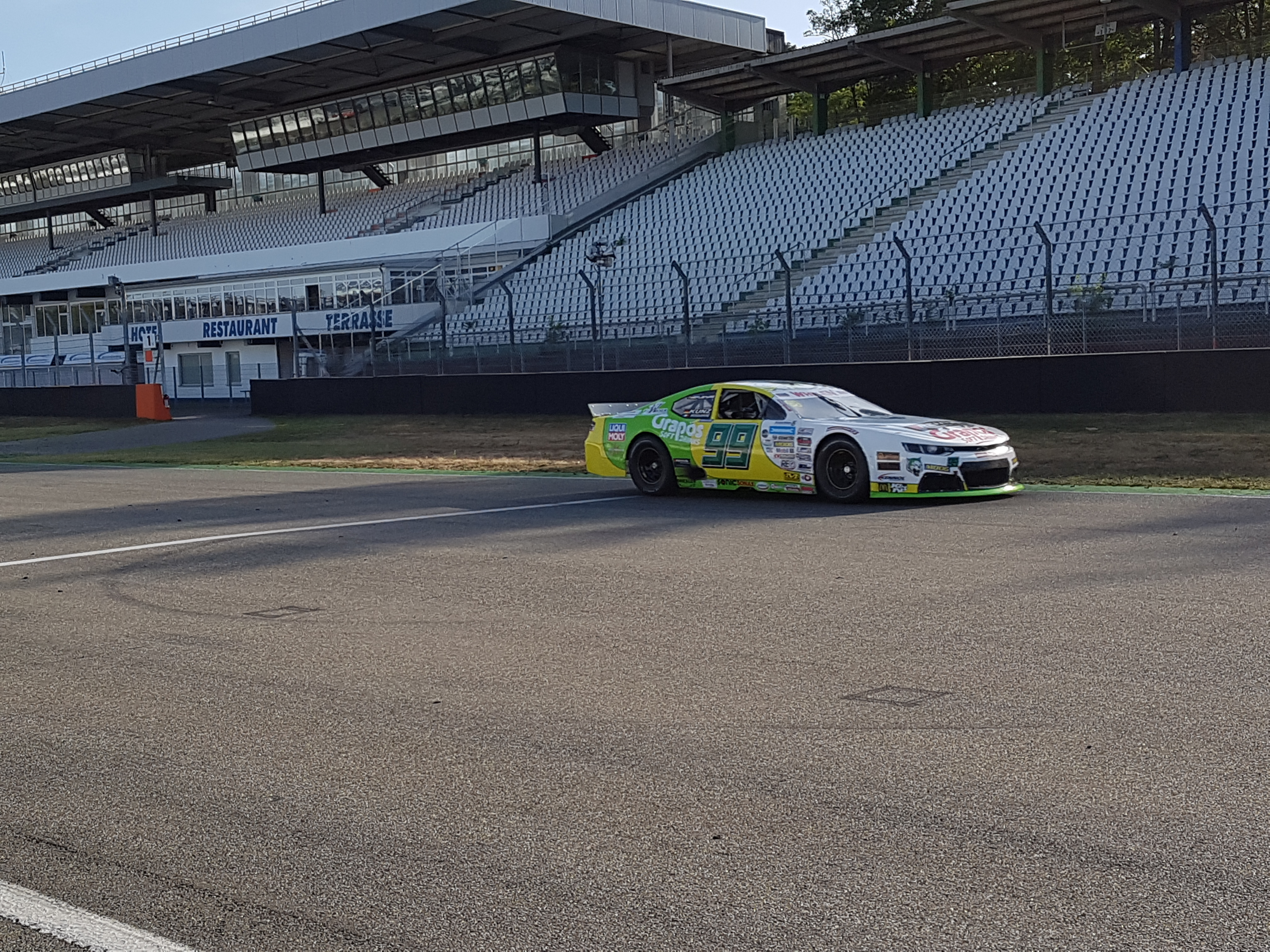
Alain Mosqueron in the No. 99 Chevrolet Camaro - DF1 Racing

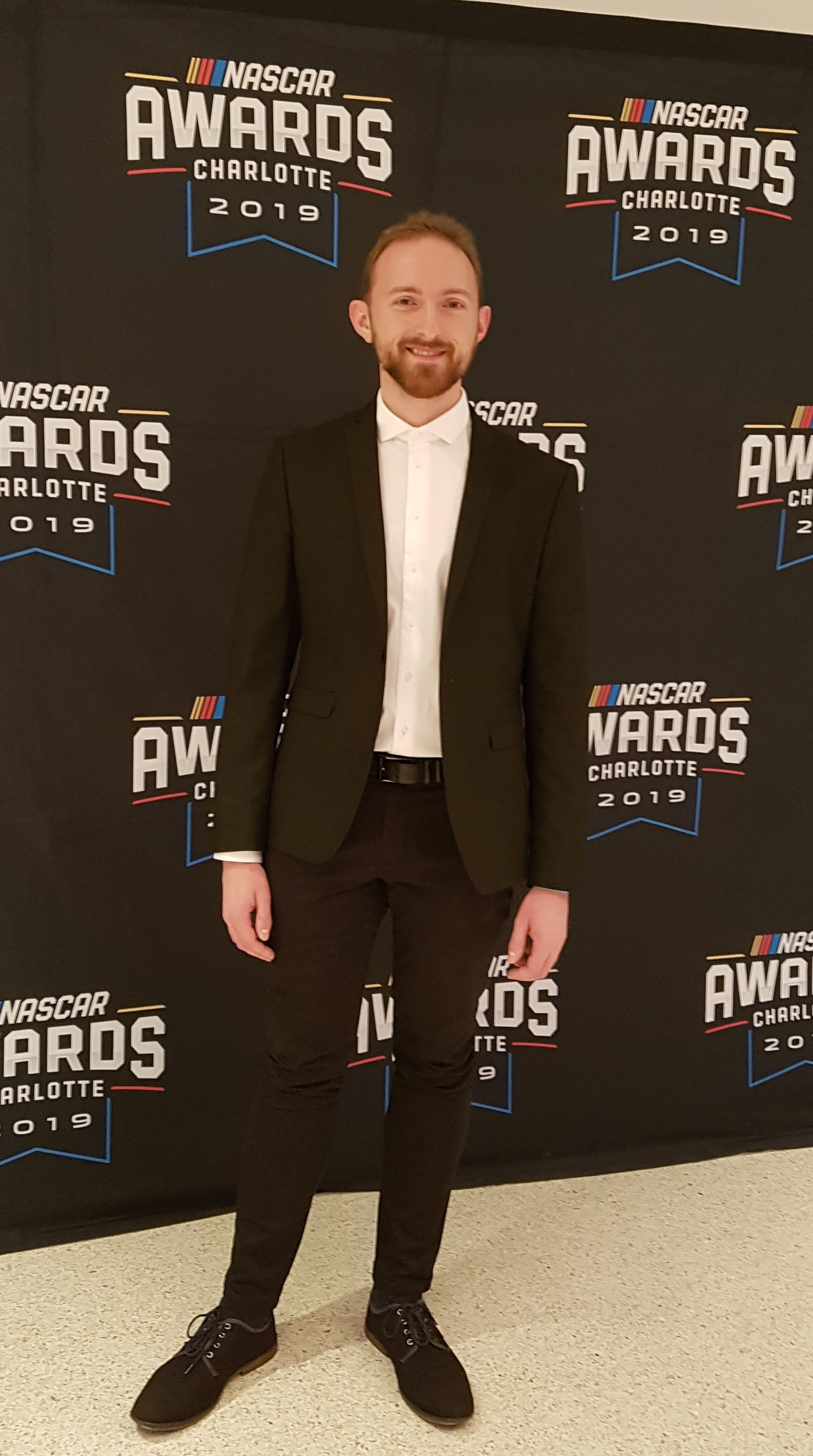
Mosqueron at the 2019 NASCAR Awards banquet

In 2019, Mosqueron began his stock car racing career and joined the NASCAR Whelen Euro Series after being selected into the 2019 recruitment program of the NASCAR Whelen Euro Series. He drove the No. 99 Chevrolet Camaro of the Austrian DF1 Racing team in the "Elite Club" division.

After a first meeting in Circuit Ricardo Tormo (Spain) with a fifth place, Mosqueron finished fourth during the meeting at Autodromo di Franciacorta (Italy) and 3rd during the third meeting at Hockenheimring (Germany). It was the first podium in his career.

On October 3, 2019, in Circuit Zolder (Belgium), Mosqueron arrived at the last event of the championship as third in the championship with a gap of 8 points behind Giovanni Trione and tied by Andreas Kuchelbacher, second in the general classification. Mosqueron won his first series race and was crowned as the 2019 NASCAR Whelen Euro Series Elite Club Division Champion in his first season competing for the NASCAR championship. On November 23, 2019, Mosqueron went to Charlotte, North Carolina in the United States as part of the European delegation to the NASCAR Awards ceremony at the NASCAR Hall Of Fame.

On December 12, 2019, Mosqueron was confirmed by DF1 Racing for the 2020 season to defend his title in the EuroNASCAR Club division and plans a part-time schedule in the EuroNASCAR 2 category.

== Motorsports results ==
- 2017 : 43rd in the Sodi World Series world final in the Individual category
- 2017 : French Champion and Vice World Champion in the Sodi World Series championship in the Endurance category - Kart & Diem team
- 2018 : Vice-champion of France and third in the world rankings in the Sodi World Series championship in the Endurance category - Kart & Diem team
- 2019 : NASCAR Whelen Euro Series Elite Club Division Champion - DF1 Racing
- 2020 : NASCAR Whelen Euro Series Club Challenge Division Champion - DF1 Racing

=== NASCAR Whelen Euro Series 2019 – Elite Club ===
NASCAR Whelen Euro Series - Club Challenge results
Year	Team	No.	Make	1	2	3	4	NWES	Pts
2019	DF1 Racing	99	Chevy	VAL; 5	FRA; 4	HOC; 3	ZOL; 1	1st	274
2020	DF1 Racing	99	Chevy	ZOL; 2	CRO; 1	ESP; 1		1st	224
