= 2026 NASCAR Euro Series =

European auto racing season

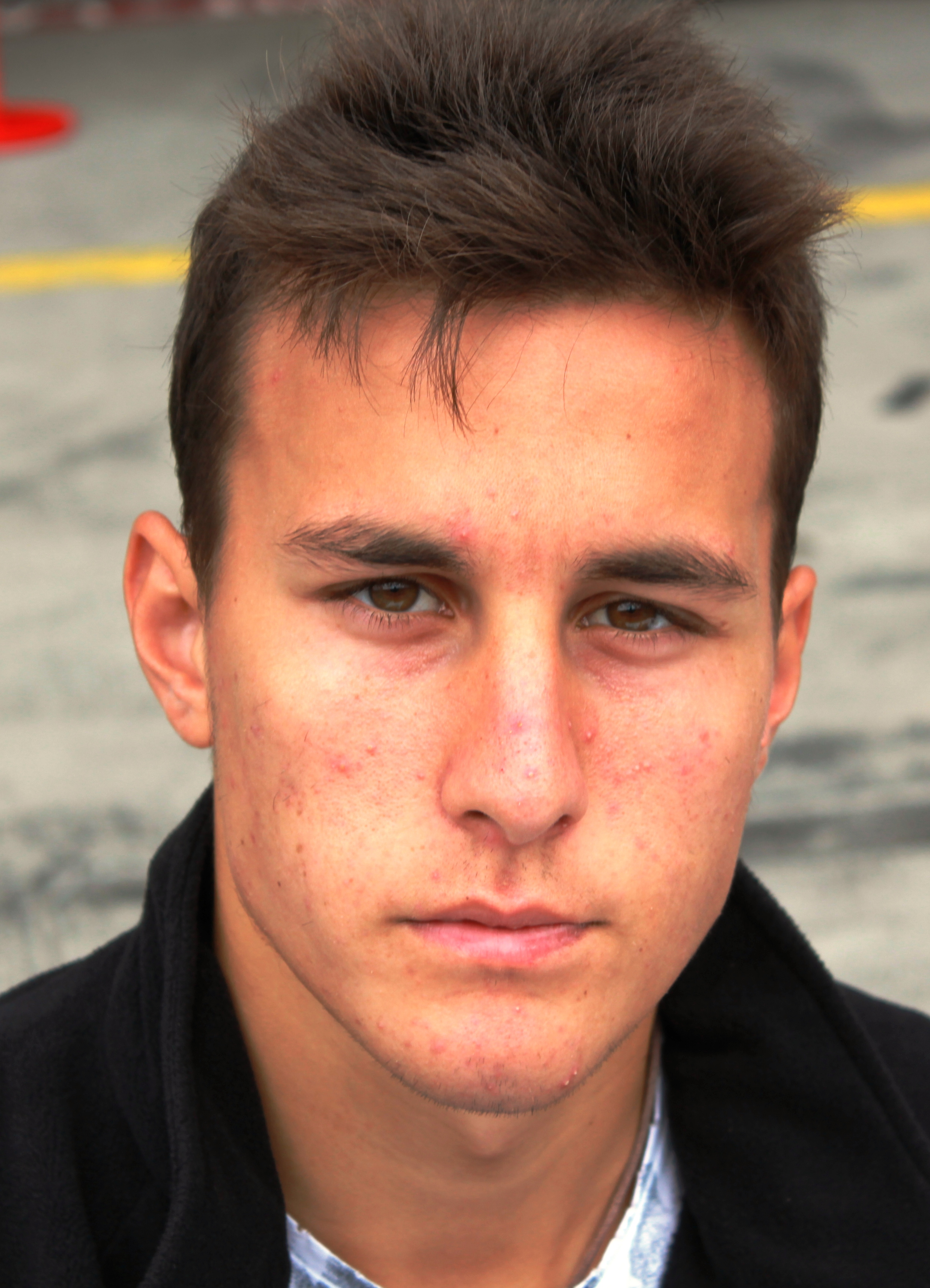
Vittorio Ghirelli, the 2026 NASCAR Euro Series Champion. This was his third consecutive championship in the series.

Locations of the circuits that hosted a NASCAR Euro Series race in 2026

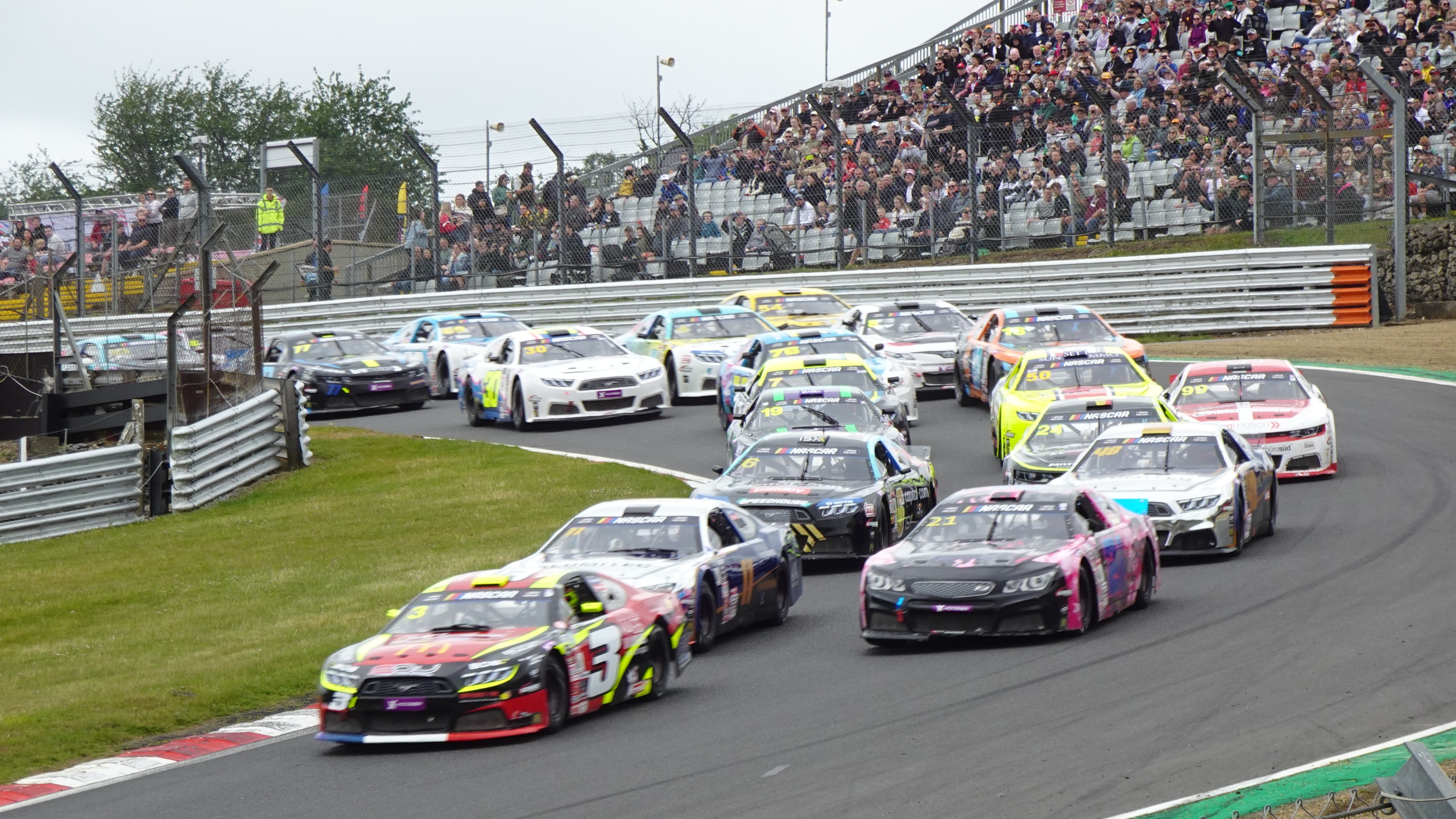
Start of the V8GP race at Brands Hatch in 2026

2026 NASCAR Euro Series at Vallelunga, Italy

The 2026 NASCAR Euro Series was the eighteenth Racecar Euro Series season, and the second under the NASCAR Euro Series branding. It was the fifteenth season of the series under official NASCAR sanctioning. The season started on 17 April with the Valencia NASCAR Fest at Circuit Ricardo Tormo and finished on 18 October with the EuroNASCAR Finals at Circuit Zolder.

Vittorio Ghirelli and Thomas Krasonis entered the season as defending champions in the PRO and OPEN divisions, respectively. Team Bleekemolen entered the season as the reigning Endurance Teams champion.

== Teams and drivers ==
=== V8GP ===
| Team | No. | Body Style | Race Driver | Rounds |
|---|---|---|---|---|
| (France) RDV Competition | 2 | Ford Mustang | (France) Olivier Deschamps | 2 |
| (France) RDV Competition | 3 | Ford Mustang | (France) Paul Jouffreau | All |
| (France) SpeedHouse Racing | 4 | Ford Mustang | (Belgium) Marc Goossens | All |
| (France) SpeedHouse Racing | 6 | Ford Mustang | (Cyprus) Vladimiros Tziortzis | All |
| (France) SpeedHouse Racing | 33 | Ford Mustang | (Canada) Brad Ranson | All |
| (Italy) Academy Motorsport | 5 | Ford Mustang | (Monaco) Alex Caffi | 1 |
| (Netherlands) Hendriks Motorsport | 7 | Ford Mustang | (Czech Republic) Martin Doubek | All |
| (Netherlands) Hendriks Motorsport | 50 | Ford Mustang | (United States) Jordan O'Brien | All |
| (Georgia (country)) Kolkhi Georgia Racing Team | 8 | Toyota Camry | (Georgia (country)) Davit Kajaia | All |
| (Canada) Alumitec Racing | 11 | Ford Mustang | (Italy) Gianmarco Ercoli | All |
| (Canada) Alumitec Racing | 48 | Ford Mustang | (Brazil) Nelson Piquet Jr. | All |
| (Belgium) PK Carsport | 13 | Chevrolet Camaro | (Greece) Thomas Krasonis | All |
| (Belgium) PK Carsport | 24 | Chevrolet Camaro | (Italy) Vittorio Ghirelli | All |
| (Canada) Hunter Aviation Racing | 16 | Chevrolet Camaro | (Canada) Andre Lortie | All |
| (United Kingdom) Lux Motorsport | 20 | FJ Racecar | (Italy) Stefano Attianese | 1 |
| (United Kingdom) Lux Motorsport | 20 | FJ Racecar | (Italy) Davide Frulio | 2 |
| (United Kingdom) Lux Motorsport | 21 | FJ Racecar | (United Kingdom) Jack Davidson | All |
| (Italy) Club Competition | 19 | Toyota Camry | (Italy) Fabrizio Armetta | 2–6 |
| (Italy) Club Competition | 22 | Toyota Camry | (Italy) Fabrizio Armetta | 1 |
| (Italy) Club Competition | 55 | Toyota Camry | (France) Ulysse Delsaux | All |
| (United States) Rette Jones Racing by Hendriks | 30 | Ford Mustang | (United States) Logan Bearden | 1–4, 6 |
| (Switzerland) THT by RaceArt Technology | 34 | Chevrolet Camaro | (Switzerland) Thomas Toffel | All |
| (Italy) CAAL Racing | 54 | Chevrolet Camaro | (Italy) Giovanni Cartechini | All |
| (Italy) CAAL Racing | 73 | Chevrolet Camaro | (France) Romain Monti | 1 |
| (Italy) CAAL Racing | 73 | Ford Mustang | (United States) Brenna Schubert | 2, 4–5 |
| (Netherlands) Team Bleekemolen | 69 | Toyota Camry | (Netherlands) Sebastiaan Bleekemolen | All |
| (Netherlands) Team Bleekemolen | 72 | Toyota Camry | (Netherlands) Jeroen Bleekemolen | 2 |
| (Netherlands) Team Bleekemolen | 76 | Toyota Camry | (United States) Vinnie Meskelis | All |
| Team Japan Needs24 by RDV | 74 | Toyota Camry | (Japan) Kenko Miura | 1–2, 5 |
| (Germany) Rehberg + Bremotion Racing | 77 | Chevrolet Camaro | (Germany) Julien Rehberg | 1–4 |
| (Germany) BS+Bremotion | 99 | Chevrolet Camaro | (United States) Garrett Lowe | All |

=== OPEN ===
| Team | No. | Body Style | Race Driver | Rounds |
|---|---|---|---|---|
| (France) RDV Competition | 2 | Ford Mustang | (France) Alain Grand | 2 |
| (France) RDV Competition | 3 | Ford Mustang | (France) Florian Richard | 1–2 |
| (France) SpeedHouse Racing | 4 | Ford Mustang | (Belgium) Maxim Van Laere | 1–2 |
| (France) SpeedHouse Racing | 6 | Ford Mustang | (Cyprus) Vladimiros Tziortzis | 1–2 |
| (France) SpeedHouse Racing | 33 | Ford Mustang | (Finland) Henri Timonen | 1–2 |
| (Italy) Academy Motorsport | 5 | Ford Mustang | (Italy) Federico Monti | 1–2 |
| (Netherlands) Hendriks Motorsport | 7 | Ford Mustang | (Czech Republic) Martin Doubek | 1–2 |
| (Netherlands) Hendriks Motorsport | 50 | Ford Mustang | (Luxembourg) Gil Linster | 1–2 |
| (Georgia (country)) Kolkhi Georgia Racing Team | 8 | Toyota Camry | (Georgia (country)) Mariam Davitidze | 1–2 |
| (Canada) Alumitec Racing | 11 | Ford Mustang | (Canada) Raphael Lessard | 1–2 |
| (Canada) Hunter Aviation Racing | 16 | Chevrolet Camaro | (Canada) Andre Lortie | 1–2 |
| (Italy) Club Competition | 19 | Toyota Camry | (Belgium) Jens Beeusaert | 2 |
| (Italy) Club Competition | 55 | Toyota Camry | (Italy) Giovanni Faraonio | 1–2 |
| (United Kingdom) Lux Motorsport | 20 | FJ Racecar | (Finland) Ossi Pohjanharju | 1–2 |
| (United Kingdom) Lux Motorsport | 21 | FJ Racecar | (Italy) Francesco Leogrande | 1–2 |
| (Belgium) PK Carsport | 24 | Chevrolet Camaro | (France) Thomas Dombrowski | 1–2 |
| (United States) Rette Jones Racing by Hendriks | 30 | Ford Mustang | (Germany) "Happinessa" | 1–2 |
| (Switzerland) THT by RaceArt Technology | 34 | Chevrolet Camaro | (Switzerland) Thomas Toffel | 1–2 |
| (Italy) CAAL Racing | 54 | Chevrolet Camaro | (Italy) Claudio Cappelli | 1–2 |
| (Italy) CAAL Racing | 73 | Chevrolet Camaro | (Italy) Valentino Gambarotto | 1–2 |
| (Netherlands) Team Bleekemolen | 69 | Toyota Camry | (Netherlands) Melvin de Groot | 1–2 |
| (Netherlands) Team Bleekemolen | 72 | Toyota Camry | (Georgia (country)) Sandro Tavartkiladze | 1–2 |
| (Netherlands) Team Bleekemolen | 76 | Toyota Camry | (Netherlands) Michael Bleekemolen | 1–2 |
| Team Japan Needs24 by RDV | 74 | Toyota Camry | (Japan) Kenko Miura | 1–2 |
| (Germany) Rehberg + Bremotion Racing | 77 | Chevrolet Camaro | (Netherlands) Beitske Visser | 1–2 |
| (Germany) BS+Bremotion | 99 | Chevrolet Camaro | (Germany) Dominique Schaak | 1–2 |

=== Rookie Challenge ===
| Team | No. | Body Style | Race Driver | Rounds |
|---|---|---|---|---|
| (France) RDV Competition | 2 | Ford Mustang | (France) Olivier Deschamps | 2 |
| (France) RDV Competition | 3 | Ford Mustang | (France) Yann Schar | 1–2 |
| (France) SpeedHouse Racing | 4 | Ford Mustang | (Portugal) Nuno Caetano | 1–2 |
| (France) SpeedHouse Racing | 6 | Ford Mustang | (Austria) Andreas Kuchelbacher | 1–2 |
| (France) SpeedHouse Racing | 33 | Ford Mustang | (France) Yann Cristovao | 1–2 |
| (Italy) Academy Motorsport | 5 | Ford Mustang | (France) Gianni Lasserre | 1–2 |
| (Canada) Alumitec Racing | 11 | Ford Mustang | (Canada) Raphael Lessard | 1–2 |
| (Canada) Alumitec Racing | 48 | Ford Mustang | (Brazil) Nelson Piquet Jr. | 1–2 |
| (Canada) Hunter Aviation Racing | 16 | Chevrolet Camaro | (Canada) Andre Lortie | 1–2 |
| (United Kingdom) Lux Motorsport | 20 | FJ Racecar | (Israel) Ofek Elyahu | 1–2 |
| (United Kingdom) Lux Motorsport | 21 | FJ Racecar | (United Kingdom) Nicole Davidson | 1–2 |
| (Italy) Club Competition | 19 | Toyota Camry | (United States) Mike Wise | 1 |
| (Italy) Club Competition | 55 | Toyota Camry | (Belgium) Jens Beeusaert | 1 |
| (Italy) Club Competition | 55 | Toyota Camry | (United States) Mike Wise | 2 |
| (United States) Rette Jones Racing by Hendriks | 30 | Ford Mustang | (Switzerland) Maral Ghazarian | 1–2 |
| (Netherlands) Hendriks Motorsport | 50 | Ford Mustang | (Germany) Henrik Peters | 1–2 |
| (Italy) CAAL Racing | 54 | Chevrolet Camaro | (Italy) Giovanni Cartechini | 1–2 |
| (Italy) CAAL Racing | 73 | Chevrolet Camaro | (United Kingdom) Jacob Parry | 1–2 |
| (Netherlands) Team Bleekemolen | 69 | Toyota Camry | (Netherlands) Robin Bleekemolen | 1–2 |
| (Netherlands) Team Bleekemolen | 72 | Toyota Camry | (Georgia (country)) Sandro Kajaia | 1–2 |
| (Netherlands) Team Bleekemolen | 76 | Toyota Camry | (United States) Vinnie Meskelis | 1–2 |
| (Germany) Rehberg + Bremotion Racing | 77 | Chevrolet Camaro | (Germany) Maximilian Seth | 1–2 |
| (Germany) BS+Bremotion | 99 | Chevrolet Camaro | (United Kingdom) Kelvin Hassell | 1–2 |

== Schedule ==
| Round | | Race title | Track | Date |
|---|---|---|---|---|
| 1 | R1 | NASCAR GP Spain | (Spain) Circuit Ricardo Tormo, Valencia | 18 April |
| 1 | R2 | NASCAR GP Spain | (Spain) Circuit Ricardo Tormo, Valencia | 19 April |
| 2 | R3 | NASCAR GP France | (France) Circuit Paul Ricard, Le Castellet | 23 May |
| 2 | R4 | NASCAR GP France | (France) Circuit Paul Ricard, Le Castellet | 24 May |
| 3 | R5 | NASCAR GP UK | (United Kingdom) Brands Hatch (Indy), West Kingsdown | 6 June |
| 3 | R6 | NASCAR GP UK | (United Kingdom) Brands Hatch (Indy), West Kingsdown | 7 June |
| 4 | R7 | NASCAR GP Czech Republic | (Czech Republic) Autodrom Most, Most | 29 August |
| 4 | R8 | NASCAR GP Czech Republic | (Czech Republic) Autodrom Most, Most | 30 August |
EuroNASCAR Playoffs
| 5 | R9 | EuroNASCAR Semi-Finals – NASCAR GP Italy | (Italy) Autodromo Vallelunga, Campagnano di Roma | 19 September |
| 5 | R10 | EuroNASCAR Semi-Finals – NASCAR GP Italy | (Italy) Autodromo Vallelunga, Campagnano di Roma | 20 September |
| 6 | R11 | EuroNASCAR Finals – NASCAR GP Belgium | (Belgium) Circuit Zolder, Heusden-Zolder | 17 October |
| 6 | R12 | EuroNASCAR Finals – NASCAR GP Belgium | (Belgium) Circuit Zolder, Heusden-Zolder | 18 October |

=== Rookie Challenge ===
| Round | Race title | Track | Date |
|---|---|---|---|
| 1 | NASCAR GP Spain | (Spain) Circuit Ricardo Tormo, Valencia | 17 April |
| 2 | NASCAR GP France | (France) Circuit Paul Ricard, Le Castellet | 22 May |
| 3 | NASCAR GP Czech Republic | (Czech Republic) Autodrom Most, Most | 28 August |
EuroNASCAR Playoffs
| 4 | EuroNASCAR Semi-Finals – NASCAR GP Italy | (Italy) Autodromo Vallelunga, Campagnano di Roma | 18 September |
| 5 | EuroNASCAR Finals – NASCAR GP Belgium | (Belgium) Circuit Zolder, Heusden-Zolder | 15 October |

== Results ==
=== V8GP ===
| Round | | Race | Pole position | Fastest lap | Most laps led | Winning driver | Winning team | Winning manufacturer |
|---|---|---|---|---|---|---|---|---|
| 1 | R1 | Valencia NASCAR Fest | (Italy) Gianmarco Ercoli | (Italy) Gianmarco Ercoli | (Italy) Gianmarco Ercoli | (Italy) Gianmarco Ercoli | (Canada) Alumitec Racing | Ford |
| 1 | R2 | Valencia NASCAR Fest | (Italy) Gianmarco Ercoli | (Italy) Gianmarco Ercoli | (Italy) Vittorio Ghirelli | (Italy) Vittorio Ghirelli | (Belgium) PK Carsport | Chevrolet |
| 2 | R3 | NASCAR GP France | (France) Paul Jouffreau | (Greece) Thomas Krasonis | (Italy) Vittorio Ghirelli | (Italy) Vittorio Ghirelli | (Belgium) PK Carsport | Chevrolet |
| 2 | R4 | NASCAR GP France | (Greece) Thomas Krasonis | (Greece) Thomas Krasonis | (France) Paul Jouffreau | (France) Paul Jouffreau | (France) RDV Competition | Ford |
| 3 | R5 | American SpeedFest 13 | (United States) Garrett Lowe | (France) Paul Jouffreau | (Italy) Gianmarco Ercoli | (Italy) Vittorio Ghirelli | (Belgium) PK Carsport | Chevrolet |
| 3 | R6 | American SpeedFest 13 | (France) Paul Jouffreau | (Italy) Gianmarco Ercoli | (France) Paul Jouffreau | (France) Paul Jouffreau | (France) RDV Competition | Ford |
| 4 | R7 | NASCAR GP Czech Republic | (Greece) Thomas Krasonis | (Switzerland) Thomas Toffel | (United States) Jordan O'Brien | (United States) Jordan O'Brien | (Netherlands) Hendriks Motorsport | Ford |
| 4 | R8 | NASCAR GP Czech Republic | (Switzerland) Thomas Toffel | (Switzerland) Thomas Toffel | (Italy) Gianmarco Ercoli | (Italy) Gianmarco Ercoli | (Canada) Alumitec Racing | Ford |
EuroNASCAR Playoffs
| 5 | R9 | NASCAR GP Italy | (Greece) Thomas Krasonis | (Brazil) Nelson Piquet Jr. | (Brazil) Nelson Piquet Jr. | (Brazil) Nelson Piquet Jr. | (Canada) Alumitec Racing | Ford |
| 5 | R10 | NASCAR GP Italy | (Brazil) Nelson Piquet Jr. | (Greece) Thomas Krasonis | (Brazil) Nelson Piquet Jr. | (Brazil) Nelson Piquet Jr. | (Canada) Alumitec Racing | Ford |
| 6 | R11 | NASCAR GP Belgium | (United States) Garrett Lowe | (United States) Garrett Lowe | | (France) Paul Jouffreau | (France) RDV Competition | Ford |
| 6 | R12 | NASCAR GP Belgium | (United States) Garrett Lowe | (United States) Vinnie Meskelis | | (France) Paul Jouffreau | (France) RDV Competition | Ford |

=== EuroNASCAR OPEN ===
| Round | | Race | Pole position | Fastest lap | Most laps led | Winning driver | Winning team | Winning manufacturer |
|---|---|---|---|---|---|---|---|---|
| 1 | R1 | Valencia NASCAR Fest | (Canada) Raphael Lessard | (Canada) Raphael Lessard | (Canada) Raphael Lessard | (Switzerland) Thomas Toffel | (Switzerland) THT by RaceArt Technology | Chevrolet |
| 1 | R2 | Valencia NASCAR Fest | (Canada) Raphael Lessard | (Canada) Raphael Lessard | (Canada) Raphael Lessard | (Switzerland) Thomas Toffel | (Switzerland) THT by RaceArt Technology | Chevrolet |
| 2 | R3 | NASCAR GP France | (Cyprus) Vladimiros Tziortzis | (Canada) Raphael Lessard | (Switzerland) Thomas Toffel | (Switzerland) Thomas Toffel | (Switzerland) THT by RaceArt Technology | Chevrolet |
| 2 | R4 | NASCAR GP France | (Canada) Raphael Lessard | (Canada) Raphael Lessard | (Canada) Raphael Lessard | (Canada) Raphael Lessard | (Canada) Alumitec Racing | Ford |
| 3 | R5 | American SpeedFest 13 | (France) Thomas Dombrowski | (Canada) Raphael Lessard | (Czech Republic) Martin Doubek | (Czech Republic) Martin Doubek | (Netherlands) Hendriks Motorsport | Ford |
| 3 | R6 | American SpeedFest 13 | (Canada) Raphael Lessard | (Belgium) Jens Beeusaert | (Georgia (country)) Sandro Tavartkiladze | (Czech Republic) Martin Doubek | (Netherlands) Hendriks Motorsport | Ford |
| 4 | R7 | NASCAR GP Czech Republic | (Switzerland) Thomas Toffel | (Switzerland) Thomas Toffel | (Switzerland) Thomas Toffel | (Canada) Raphael Lessard | (Canada) Alumitec Racing | Ford |
| 4 | R8 | NASCAR GP Czech Republic | (Switzerland) Thomas Toffel | (Switzerland) Thomas Toffel | (Canada) Raphael Lessard | (Canada) Raphael Lessard | (Canada) Alumitec Racing | Ford |
EuroNASCAR Playoffs
| 5 | R9 | NASCAR GP Italy | (Canada) Raphael Lessard | (Canada) Raphael Lessard | | (Canada) Raphael Lessard | (Canada) Alumitec Racing | Ford |
| 5 | R10 | NASCAR GP Italy | (Canada) Raphael Lessard | (Switzerland) Thomas Toffel | | (Canada) Raphael Lessard | (Canada) Alumitec Racing | Ford |
| 6 | R11 | NASCAR GP Belgium | (Switzerland) Thomas Toffel | (Canada) Raphael Lessard | | (Italy) Claudio Cappelli | (Italy) CAAL Racing | Chevrolet |
| 6 | R12 | NASCAR GP Belgium | (Canada) Raphael Lessard | (Canada) Raphael Lessard | | (Canada) Raphael Lessard | (Canada) Alumitec Racing | Ford |

=== Rookie Challenge ===
| Round | Race | Winning driver | Winning team | Winning manufacturer |
|---|---|---|---|---|
| 1 | Valencia NASCAR Fest | (United Kingdom) Jacob Parry | (Italy) CAAL Racing | Chevrolet |
| 2 | NASCAR GP France | (Georgia (country)) Sandro Kajaia | (Netherlands) Team Bleekemolen | Toyota |
| 3 | NASCAR GP Czech Republic | (United Kingdom) Jacob Parry | (Italy) CAAL Racing | Chevrolet |
EuroNASCAR Playoffs
| 4 | NASCAR GP Italy | (France) Yann Cristovao | (France) SpeedHouse Racing | Ford |
| 5 | NASCAR GP Belgium | (France) Yann Cristovao | (France) SpeedHouse Racing | Ford |

=== Endurance Teams Championship ===
| Round | Race | Overall winner | V8GP Driver | OPEN Driver |
|---|---|---|---|---|
| 1 | Valencia NASCAR Fest | (Netherlands) Team Bleekemolen | (Netherlands) Sebastiaan Bleekemolen | (Netherlands) Melvin De Groot |
| 2 | NASCAR GP France | (Belgium) PK Carsport | (Italy) Vittorio Ghirelli | (France) Thomas Dombrowski |
| 3 | American SpeedFest 13 | (Belgium) PK Carsport | (Italy) Vittorio Ghirelli | (France) Thomas Dombrowski |
| 4 | NASCAR GP Czech Republic | (Canada) Alumitec Racing | (Italy) Gianmarco Ercoli | (Canada) Raphael Lessard |
EuroNASCAR Playoffs
| 5 | NASCAR GP Italy | (Canada) Alumitec Racing | (Italy) Gianmarco Ercoli | (Canada) Raphael Lessard |
| 6 | NASCAR GP Belgium | (Netherlands) Team Bleekemolen | (Netherlands) Michael Bleekemolen | (United States) Vinnie Meskelis |

== Standings ==
Points are awarded to drivers and team using the current point system used in NASCAR Cup Series, NASCAR O'Reilly Auto Parts Series, and NASCAR Craftsman Truck Series. The driver that gained the most positions in a race will receive 4 bonus championship points. In addition, double points are awarded for the Playoff races.

For the V8GP and EuroNASCAR OPEN driver's championship, only the best 8 results from the first 9 races and the results from the Playoffs at Oschersleben and Zolder will count towards the final standings. For the Rookie Challenge championships, points are awarded per session and the results listed from each round in the standings are the combined results. For the Endurance Teams Championship, all points will be counted with no dropped scores.

=== V8GP ===
(key) Bold - Pole position awarded by fastest qualifying time (in Race 1) or by previous race's fastest lap (in Race 2). Italics - Fastest lap. * – Most laps led. ^ – Most positions gained.

| Pos | Driver | (Spain) ESP | | (France) FRA | | (United Kingdom) GBR | | (Czech Republic) CZE | | (Italy) ITA | | (Belgium) BEL | | Points |
|---|---|---|---|---|---|---|---|---|---|---|---|---|---|---|
| 1 | (Italy) Vittorio Ghirelli | 3 | 1 | 1 | 4 | 1 | 4 | 4 | 17 | 7 | 3 | 7 | 10 | 495 |
| 2 | (France) Paul Jouffreau | 2 | 20 | **14** | 1 | 17 | 1 | 20 | 7 | 11 | 5 | 1 | 1 | 480 |
| 3 | (Brazil) Nelson Piquet Jr. | 18 | 3 | 24 | 6 | 2 | 22 | 9 | 9 | 1 | **1** | 6 | 3 | 480 |
| 4 | (United States) Jordan O'Brien | 4 | 19 | 2 | 3 | 4 | 2 | 1 | 18 | 9 | 10 | 10 | 7 | 453 |
| 5 | (Greece) Thomas Krasonis | 17 | 4 | 21 | **2** | 6 | **5** | **3** | 21 | **3** | 2 | 12 | 5 | 453 |
| 6 | (United States) Garrett Lowe | 7 | 2 | 7 | 13 | **5** | 16 | 10 | 3 | 6 | 9 | **2** | **20** | 442 |
| 7 | (Italy) Gianmarco Ercoli | **1** | **12** | 23 | 5 | DSQ | DSQ | 2 | 1 | 2 | 6 | 4 | 14 | 420 |
| 8 | (Czech Republic) Martin Doubek | 11 | DNS | 3 | 9 | 11 | 3 | 5 | 5 | 8 | 7 | 11 | NC | 416 |
| 9 | (Netherlands) Sebastiaan Bleekemolen | 6 | 8 | 15 | 20 | 14 | 12 | 11 | 12 | 24 | 8 | 3 | 4 | 408 |
| 10 | (United States) Vinnie Meskelis | 24 | 7 | 25 | 11 | 7 | 8 | 7 | 6 | 22 | 11 | 8 | 2 | 402 |
| 11 | (Cyprus) Vladimiros Tziortzis | 22 | 11 | 5 | 10 | 8 | 6 | 15 | 19 | 10 | 12 | 9 | 12 | 395 |
| 12 | (United Kingdom) Jack Davidson | 5 | 9 | 11 | 25 | 3 | 19 | 8 | 10 | 17 | 13 | 23 | 9 | 378 |
| 13 | (Belgium) Marc Goossens | 10 | 13 | DNS | DNS | 9 | 7 | 21 | 11 | 12 | 14 | 5 | 6 | 377 |
| 14 | (France) Ulysse Delsaux | 8 | 18 | 10 | 24 | NC | 11 | 12 | 13 | 14 | 16 | 15 | 13 | 366 |
| 15 | (Georgia (country)) Davit Kajaia | 16 | 21 | 6 | 8 | 10 | 15 | 23 | 14 | 13 | 15 | 14 | 11 | 363 |
| 16 | (Italy) Fabrizio Armetta | 23 | Wth | 8 | 7 | 20 | 21 | 17 | 4 | 5 | 4 | 19 | 22 | 358 |
| 17 | (Canada) Brad Ranson | 19 | 16 | 18 | 17 | 13 | 14 | 16 | 15 | 15 | 19 | 21 | 16 | 309 |
| 18 | (Switzerland) Thomas Toffel | 21 | 6 | 4 | 21 | DNS | 20 | 22 | **2** | 4 | NC | 22 | 19 | 299 |
| 19 | (United States) Logan Bearden | 9 | 10 | 13 | 15 | 18 | 9 | 6 | 8 | | | 13 | 8 | 295 |
| 20 | (Italy) Giovanni Cartechini | 13 | 14 | 16 | 14 | 15 | 13 | 18 | 20 | 20 | 17 | NC | 23 | 273 |
| 21 | (Canada) Andre Lortie | Wth | Wth | 20 | 19 | 19 | 18 | 19 | 23 | 21 | 22 | 20 | 21 | 241 |
| 22 | (United States) Mike Wise | | | | | 16 | 17 | | | 19 | 21 | 18 | 18 | 194 |
| 23 | (Germany) Julien Rehberg | 20 | 5 | 12 | 12 | 12 | 10 | 24 | 22 | | | | | 166 |
| 24 | (United States) Brenna Schubert | Wth | Wth | DNS | DNS | | | 13 | 24 | 16 | 18 | | | 131 |
| 25 | (Japan) Kenko Miura | 12 | DNS | 22 | 22 | | | | | 26 | NC | | | 90 |
| 26 | (Netherlands) Michael Bleekemolen | | | | | | | 14 | 16 | 18 | NC | | | 88 |
| 27 | (Monaco) Alex Caffi | 14 | 15 | | | | | | | | | | | 45 |
| 28 | (Netherlands) Jeroen Bleekemolen | | | 9 | 23 | | | | | | | | | 42 |
| 29 | (Italy) Stefano Attianese | 15 | 17 | | | | | | | | | | | 42 |
| 30 | (Italy) Davide Frulio | | | 17 | 16 | | | | | | | | | 41 |
| 31 | (France) Alain Grand | | | 19 | 18 | | | | | | | | | 37 |
| – | (France) Romain Monti | DNS | DNS | | | | | | | | | | | — |
| Guest entries ineligible for points | | | | | | | | | | | | | | |
| – | (Netherlands) Pim VanRiet | | | | | | | | | | | 16 | 15 | — |
| – | (Belgium) Sven Van Laere | | | | | | | | | NC | NC | 17 | 17 | — |
| – | (Switzerland) Nicolas Maunier | | | | | | | | | 23 | 20 | | | — |
| – | (Luxembourg) Gil Linster | | | | | | | | | 25 | 23 | | | — |

== See also ==
- 2026 NASCAR Cup Series
- 2026 NASCAR O'Reilly Auto Parts Series
- 2026 NASCAR Craftsman Truck Series
- 2026 ARCA Menards Series
- 2026 ARCA Menards Series East
- 2026 ARCA Menards Series West
- 2026 NASCAR Whelen Modified Tour
- 2026 NASCAR Canada Series
- 2026 NASCAR Brasil Series
