= 2025 NASCAR Euro Series =

European auto racing season

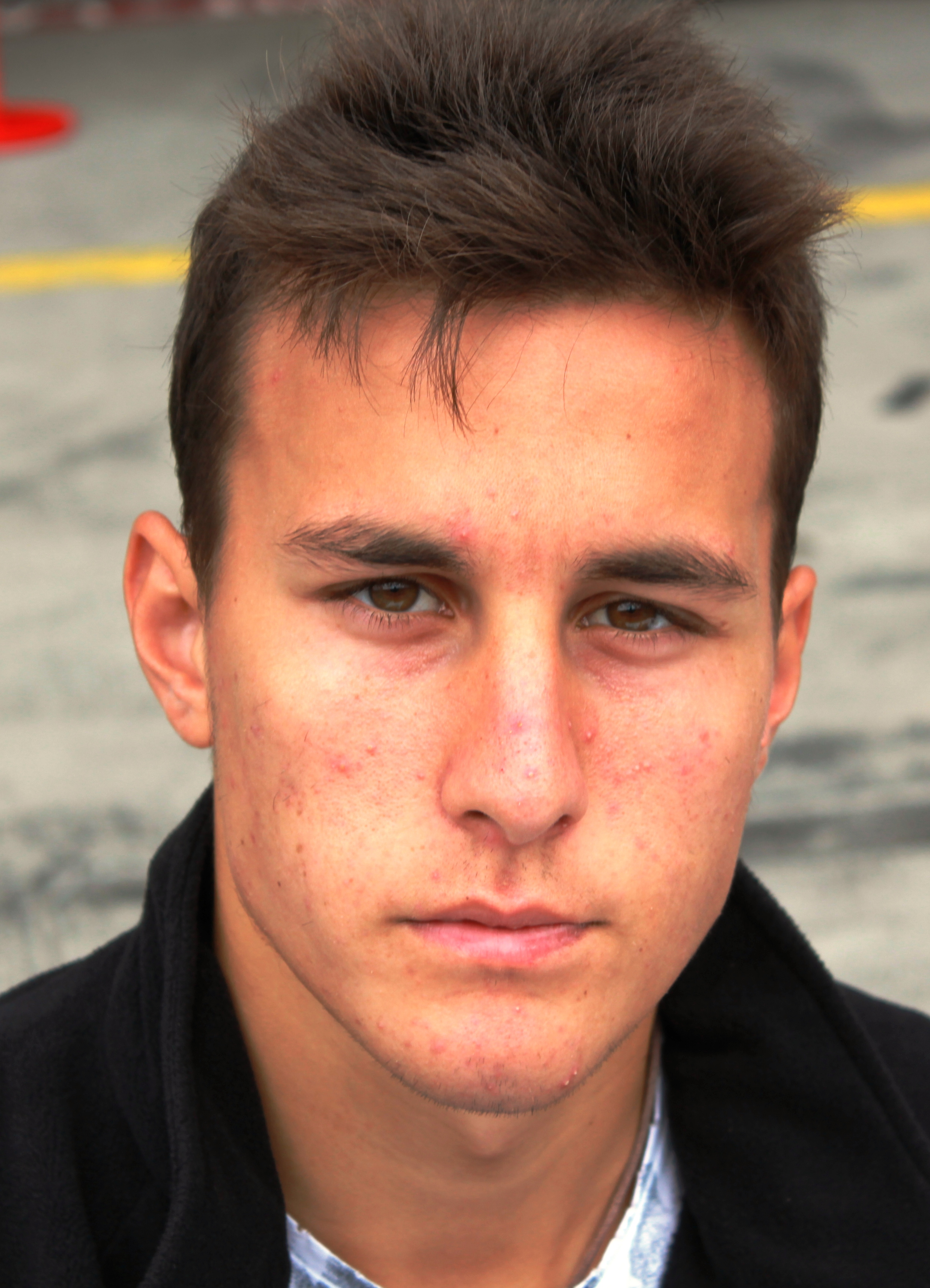
Vittorio Ghirelli, the 2025 NASCAR Euro Series Champion. This was his second consecutive championship in the series.

Locations of the circuits that hosted a NASCAR Euro Series race in 2025

The 2025 NASCAR Euro Series was the seventeenth Racecar Euro Series season, and the first under the NASCAR Euro Series branding. It was the fourteenth season of the series under official NASCAR sanctioning. The season started on 12 April with the Valencia NASCAR Fest at Circuit Ricardo Tormo and finished on 12 October with the EuroNASCAR Finals at Circuit Zolder.

Both Vittorio Ghirelli and Martin Doubek entered the season as defending champions in the PRO and OPEN divisions respectively. RDV Competition entered the season as the reigning Endurance Teams champion.

Vittorio Ghirelli secured his second consecutive EuroNASCAR PRO championship with a dominant performance in the season finale, as the Italian driver completed a perfect sweep in the Finals at Circuit Zolder in Belgium, finishing ahead of Gianmarco Ercoli and Paul Jouffreau to claim the title.

Thomas Krasonis became the first Greek NASCAR Euro Series Champion, securing the title in the OPEN division. A maiden OPEN division victory at Valencia, Spain was followed by five more visits to the Victory Lane, in his campaign to become the first Greek to win a European NASCAR title. With a total of 544 points, Krasonis closed his season with a 33-point lead over Martin Doubek in the standings.

Team Bleekemolen won their first Endurance Teams championship.

== Teams and drivers ==
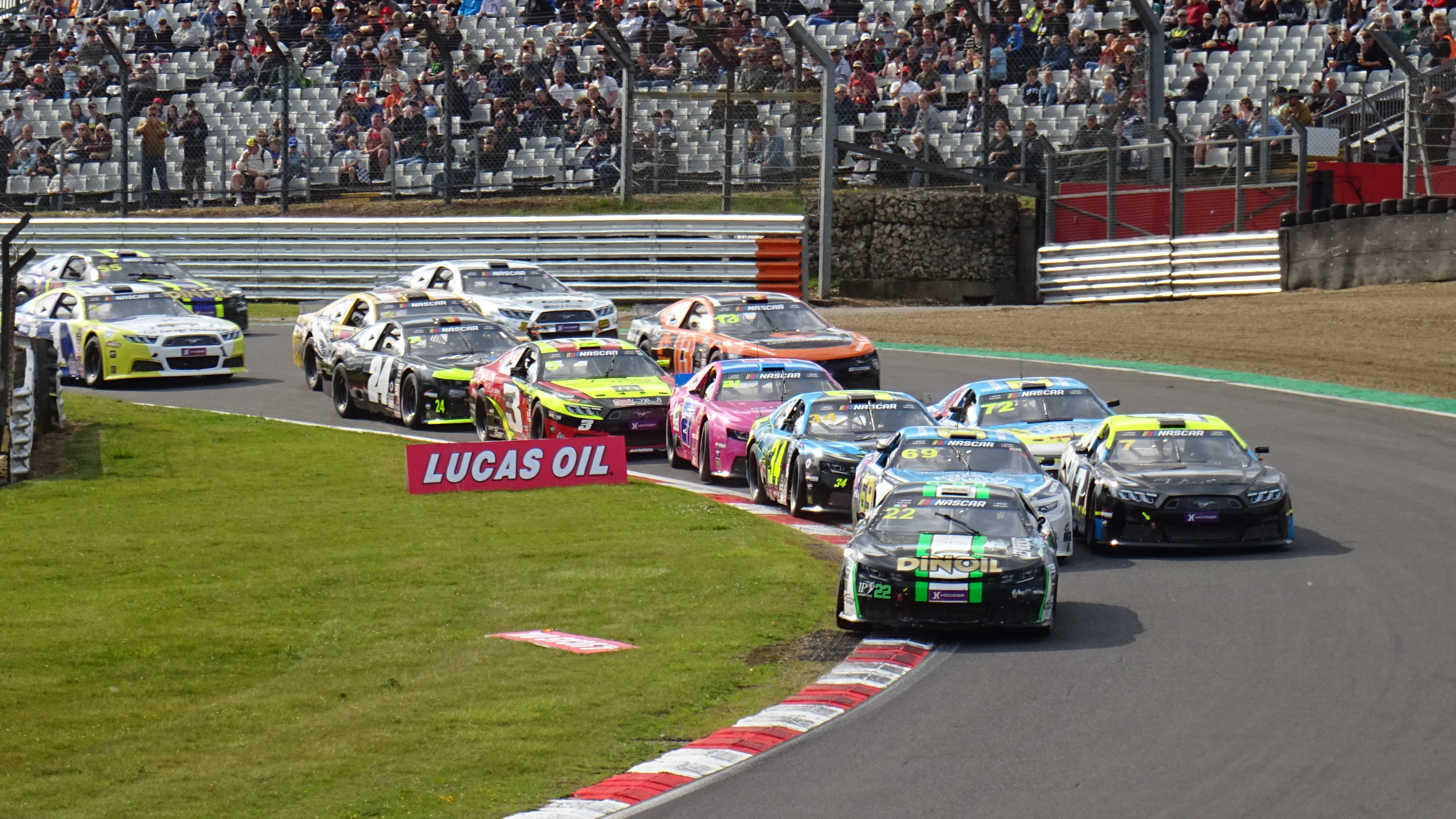
The start of the NASCAR Euro series OPEN race at Brands Hatch

=== PRO ===
| Team | No. | Body Style | Race Driver | Rounds |
|---|---|---|---|---|
| (Italy) Academy Motorsport | 1 | Ford Mustang | (Belgium) Marc Goossens | 1–2 |
| (Italy) Academy Motorsport | 1 | Ford Mustang | (Italy) Federico Monti | 3–4, 6 |
| (Italy) Academy Motorsport | 1 | Ford Mustang | (Italy) Dario Caso | 5 |
| (Italy) Academy Motorsport | 5 | Ford Mustang | (Italy) Claudio Remigio Cappelli | All |
| (France) RDV Competition | 3 | Ford Mustang | (France) Paul Jouffreau | All |
| (Netherlands) Hendriks Motorsport | 7 | Ford Mustang | (Czech Republic) Martin Doubek | All |
| (Georgia (country)) Team Georgia | 9 | Chevrolet Camaro | (Georgia (country)) Davit Kajaia | 2–6 |
| (Canada) Alumitec Racing | 11 | Ford Mustang | (Italy) Gianmarco Ercoli | All |
| (Belgium) PK Carsport | 13 | Chevrolet Camaro | (Greece) Thomas Krasonis | All |
| (Belgium) PK Carsport | 24 | Chevrolet Camaro | (Italy) Vittorio Ghirelli | All |
| (France) SpeedHouse Racing | 14 | Ford Mustang | (France) Ulysse Delsaux | 1–2, 4–6 |
| (France) SpeedHouse Racing | 20 | Ford Mustang | (North Macedonia) Igor Stefanovski | 6 |
| (France) SpeedHouse Racing | 33 | Ford Mustang | (Switzerland) Giorgio Maggi | All |
| (France) SpeedHouse Racing | 64 | Ford Mustang | (Cyprus) Vladimiros Tziortzis | All |
| (United Kingdom) Lux Motorsport | 21 | Chevrolet Camaro | (United Kingdom) Jack Davidson | All |
| (Italy) Club Competition (Note: The team originally entered the season as Club Motorsport. They undergo a rebrand before the Vallelunga round and will enter the championship under the Club Competition identity from Vallelunga onwards.) | 22 | Chevrolet Camaro | (France) Ulysse Delsaux | 3 |
| (Italy) Club Competition | 22 | Chevrolet Camaro | (Italy) Giovanni Faraonio | 5 |
| (Italy) Club Competition | 22 | Chevrolet Camaro | (Belgium) Marc Goossens | 6 |
| (Italy) Club Competition | 55 | Chevrolet Camaro | (Italy) Fabrizio Armetta | All |
| (United States) Rette Jones Racing | 30 | Ford Mustang | (Netherlands) Liam Hezemans | All |
| (France) M Racing | 34 | Chevrolet Camaro | (France) Yvan Muller | 1–2 |
| (France) M Racing | 34 | Chevrolet Camaro | (Switzerland) Thomas Toffel | 3–6 |
| (Germany) Marko Stipp Motorsport | 46 | Chevrolet Camaro | (Ukraine) Yevgen Sokolovsky | 6 |
| (Germany) Marko Stipp Motorsport | 47 | Chevrolet Camaro | (United Kingdom) Max Marzorati | 1 |
| (Germany) Marko Stipp Motorsport | 47 | Chevrolet Camaro | (Sweden) Alexander Graff | 5 |
| (Germany) Marko Stipp Motorsport | 48 | Chevrolet Camaro | (Georgia (country)) Davit Kajaia | 1 |
| (Germany) Marko Stipp Motorsport | 48 | Chevrolet Camaro | (Ukraine) Yevgen Sokolovsky | 5 |
| (Germany) Marko Stipp Motorsport | 48 | Chevrolet Camaro | (United States) Ryan Vargas | 6 |
| (Netherlands) Race Planet Team Bleekemolen | 25 | Chevrolet Camaro | (United States) Jordan Wallace | 3 |
| (Netherlands) Race Planet Team Bleekemolen | 69 | Toyota Camry | (Netherlands) Sebastiaan Bleekemolen | All |
| (Netherlands) Race Planet Team Bleekemolen | 72 | Toyota Camry | (Netherlands) Michael Bleekemolen | 1–2 (Note: Michael Bleekemolen was originally entered in the No. 72 car for Vallelunga and competed in the Saturday PRO race, but chose to sit out the race on Sunday. Bruno Mulders, Bleekemolen's teammate in OPEN, substituted him for the event.) |
| (Netherlands) Race Planet Team Bleekemolen | 72 | Toyota Camry | (Netherlands) Bruno Mulders | 2–6 |
| (Netherlands) Race Planet Team Bleekemolen | 76 | Toyota Camry | (Czech Republic) Michal Makes | 4–5 |
| (Netherlands) Race Planet Team Bleekemolen | 76 | Toyota Camry | (United Kingdom) Chase Fernandez | 6 |
| Team Japan Needs24 | 74 | Toyota Camry | (Japan) Kenko Miura | 1, 5 |
| (Germany) Bremotion | 77 | Chevrolet Camaro | (Germany) Julien Rehberg | All |
| (Germany) Bremotion | 99 | Chevrolet Camaro | (United States) Garrett Lowe | All |
| (Italy) CAAL Racing | 75 | Chevrolet Camaro | (Canada) Raphaël Lessard | 5 |
| (Italy) CAAL Racing | 75 | Chevrolet Camaro | (Italy) Max Lanza | 6 |
| (Italy) CAAL Racing | 88 | Chevrolet Camaro | (Italy) Max Lanza | 1–3 |
| (Italy) CAAL Racing | 89 | Chevrolet Camaro | (Italy) Max Lanza | 4 |
| (Italy) CAAL Racing | 89 | Chevrolet Camaro | (United Kingdom) Max Marzorati | 2–3 |

=== OPEN ===
| Team | No. | Body Style | Race Driver | Rounds |
|---|---|---|---|---|
| (Italy) Academy Motorsport | 1 | Ford Mustang | (Belgium) Andres Beers | All |
| (Italy) Academy Motorsport | 5 | Ford Mustang | (Italy) Claudio Remigio Cappelli | All |
| (France) RDV Competition | 3 | Ford Mustang | (Austria) Patrick Schober | All |
| (Netherlands) Hendriks Motorsport | 7 | Ford Mustang | (Czech Republic) Martin Doubek | All |
| (Georgia (country)) Team Georgia | 9 | Chevrolet Camaro | (Georgia (country)) Sandro Tavartkiladze | 2–6 |
| (Canada) Alumitec Racing | 11 | Ford Mustang | (Italy) Valentino Gambarotto | All |
| (Belgium) PK Carsport | 13 | Chevrolet Camaro | (Greece) Thomas Krasonis | All |
| (Belgium) PK Carsport | 24 | Chevrolet Camaro | (France) Thomas Dombrowski | All |
| (France) SpeedHouse Racing | 14 | Ford Mustang | (Italy) Arianna Casoli | 1–2 |
| (France) SpeedHouse Racing | 14 | Ford Mustang | (Monaco) Fabrice Pantani | 4 |
| (France) SpeedHouse Racing | 14 | Ford Mustang | (Spain) José Antonio Peñalta | 5 |
| (France) SpeedHouse Racing | 14 | Ford Mustang | (France) Ulysse Delsaux | 6 |
| (France) SpeedHouse Racing | 33 | Ford Mustang | (France) Florian Richard | All |
| (France) SpeedHouse Racing | 64 | Ford Mustang | (Belgium) Sven van Laere | 2–6 |
| (United Kingdom) Lux Motorsport | 21 | Chevrolet Camaro | (Italy) Mario Ercoli | 1–2 |
| (United Kingdom) Lux Motorsport | 21 | Chevrolet Camaro | (United Kingdom) Matthew Ellis | 3 |
| (United Kingdom) Lux Motorsport | 21 | Chevrolet Camaro | (United States) Mike Wise | 4–5 |
| (United Kingdom) Lux Motorsport | 21 | Chevrolet Camaro | (United States) Nick Strickler | 6 |
| (Italy) Club Competition | 22 | Chevrolet Camaro | (Italy) Giovanni Faraonio | 2 |
| (Italy) Club Competition | 22 | Chevrolet Camaro | (United States) Jordan O’Brien | 3–5 |
| (Italy) Club Competition | 22 | Chevrolet Camaro | (Italy) Francesco Leogrande | 6 |
| (Italy) Club Competition | 55 | Chevrolet Camaro | (Italy) Valerio Marzi | 2, 4–6 |
| (Italy) Club Competition | 55 | Chevrolet Camaro | (United Kingdom) Gordon Barnes | 3 |
| (United States) Rette Jones Racing | 30 | Ford Mustang | (Luxembourg) Gil Linster | 1–2, 4–6 |
| (United States) Rette Jones Racing | 30 | Ford Mustang | (Netherlands) Michael Bleekemolen | 3 |
| (France) M Racing | 34 | Chevrolet Camaro | (Switzerland) Thomas Toffel | All |
| (Germany) Marko Stipp Motorsport | 47 | Chevrolet Camaro | (Belgium) Sven van Laere | 1 |
| (Germany) Marko Stipp Motorsport | 47 | Chevrolet Camaro | (Italy) Loris Cencetti | 5 |
| (Germany) Marko Stipp Motorsport | 48 | Chevrolet Camaro | (Georgia (country)) Sandro Tavartkiladze | 1 |
| (Germany) Marko Stipp Motorsport | 48 | Chevrolet Camaro | (United Kingdom) Gordon Barnes | 5 |
| (Germany) Marko Stipp Motorsport | 48 | Chevrolet Camaro | (Netherlands) Reza Sardeha | 6 |
| (Netherlands) Race Planet Team Bleekemolen | 25 | Chevrolet Camaro | (United States) Mike Wise | 3 |
| (Netherlands) Race Planet Team Bleekemolen | 69 | Toyota Camry | (Netherlands) Melvin de Groot | All |
| (Netherlands) Race Planet Team Bleekemolen | 72 | Toyota Camry | (Netherlands) Bruno Mulders | All |
| (Netherlands) Race Planet Team Bleekemolen | 76 | Toyota Camry | (Netherlands) Michael Bleekemolen | 4–6 |
| Team Japan Needs24 | 74 | Toyota Camry | (Japan) Kenko Miura | 1, 5 |
| (Germany) Bremotion | 77 | Chevrolet Camaro | (Germany) "Happinessa" | All |
| (Germany) Bremotion | 99 | Chevrolet Camaro | (Germany) Dominique Schaak | All |
| (Italy) CAAL Racing | 75 | Chevrolet Camaro | (Italy) Davide Frulio | 6 |
| (Italy) CAAL Racing | 89 | Chevrolet Camaro | (Italy) Davide Frulio | 3–4 |
| (Italy) CAAL Racing | 88 | Chevrolet Camaro | (Italy) Roberto Benedetti | 1–3 |

=== Rookie Challenge ===
| Team | No. | Body Style | Race Driver | Rounds |
|---|---|---|---|---|
| (Italy) Academy Motorsport | 1 | Ford Mustang | (Italy) Federico Monti | 1–2 |
| (France) RDV Competition | 3 | Ford Mustang | (Portugal) Yann Cristovao | 1–2 |
| (Belgium) PK Carsport | 13 | Chevrolet Camaro | (Belgium) Maxim van Laere | 1–2 |
| (France) SpeedHouse Racing | 14 | Ford Mustang | (Spain) José Antonio Peñalta | 1–2 |
| (France) SpeedHouse Racing | 33 | Ford Mustang | (Austria) Andreas Kuchelbacher | 1–2 |
| (France) SpeedHouse Racing | 64 | Ford Mustang | (Portugal) Nuño Caetano | 1–2 |
| (United Kingdom) Lux Motorsport | 21 | Chevrolet Camaro | (United Kingdom) Nicole Davidson | 1–2 |
| (Italy) Club Competition | 22 | Chevrolet Camaro | (United States) Mike Wise | 2 |
| (Germany) Marko Stipp Motorsport | 46 | Chevrolet Camaro | (Switzerland) Yann Schar | 1 |
| (Germany) Marko Stipp Motorsport | 47 | Chevrolet Camaro | (United States) Mike Wise | 1 |
| (Germany) Marko Stipp Motorsport | 48 | Chevrolet Camaro | (United Kingdom) Daniel Boys | 1 |
| (Netherlands) Race Planet Team Bleekemolen | 69 | Toyota Camry | (Italy) Daniil Shapka | 1–2 |
| (Netherlands) Race Planet Team Bleekemolen | 72 | Toyota Camry | (Netherlands) Bruno Mulders | 1–2 |
| (Germany) Bremotion | 77 | Chevrolet Camaro | (Germany) "Happinessa" | 1–2 |
| (Germany) Bremotion | 99 | Chevrolet Camaro | (United States) Garrett Lowe | 1–2 |
| (Italy) CAAL Racing | 89 | Ford Mustang | (Italy) Davide Frulio | 1–2 |

- Pink background denotes drivers that will not score points in the division.

=== Confirmed changes ===
==== Drivers ====
- On 19 December 2024, SpeedHouse announced that Matthias Hauer will make his return to the series after a year of sabbatical. Hauer will be competing part-time in the OPEN division with the #64 Ford Mustang.
- On 22 December 2024, it was announced that Spanish driver José Antonio Peñalta will be stepping up from karting to compete with SpeedHouse in the Rookie Challenge division. Peñalta will replace Dani Briz, whose status for 2025 is currently unknown.
- On 17 January 2025, it was announced that Thomas Krasonis will be switching teams from Marko Stipp Motorsport to PK Carsport for the 2025 season. Krasonis will be driving the #13 Chevrolet Camaro in both the PRO and OPEN divisions.
- On 20 January 2025, it was announced that Jack Davidson will step up to the PRO division for the full 2025 season. Davidson had previously competed part-time in PRO during the 2023 and 2024 seasons.
- On 25 January 2025, Academy Motorsport announced that Claudio Remigio Cappelli will be racing in both the PRO and OPEN divisions for the 2025 season. Cappelli had previously competed in PRO during his first full-season campaign in 2022.
- On 6 March 2025, PK Carsport team manager Anthony Kumpen revealed the signing of Thomas Dombrowski and Maxim van Laere to his team in the 2025 season. Dombrowski will join reigning series champion Vittorio Ghirelli in the #24 team, while Maxim will make his car racing debut in Rookie Challenge with the #13 team.
- On 9 March 2025, Team Bleekemolen announced that Michael Bleekemolen is set to make his debut in EuroNASCAR's top division at the age of 75 years old. Michael will replace Marc Goossens, whose status for 2025 is currently unknown. Michael's seat in OPEN will be filled by Bruno Mulders, who will be making his series debut with the Dutch team.
- On 18 March 2025, it was announced that Portuguese driver Nuño Caetano will join SpeedHouse as their third and final driver in the Rookie Challenge division. Caetano, who had previously competed in the Isle of Man TT and Pikes Peak International Hill Climb, had previously tested the EuroNASCAR cars in a Recruitment Test session at Cremona Circuit in Italy.
- On 20 March 2025, Bremotion announced the signing of eNASCAR Coca-Cola iRacing Series race winner Garrett Lowe as part of their PRO division team in 2025. Lowe is set to compete with the #99 Chevrolet Camaro, replacing Tobias Dauenhauer whose will leave the series due to financial issues. Lowe will be joined by Julien Rehberg, who makes the full-time move to PRO after he competed part-time in the division in 2024. Rehberg's former seat in the OPEN division will be filled by German social media influencer Vanessa Neumann, who will compete under her internet alias "Happinessa" for the 2025 season. Neumann will also bring sponsorship from OnlyFans to the #77 team.
- On 25 March 2025, Ryan Vargas announced that he will be leaving the NASCAR Euro Series and make the switch to the NASCAR Canada Series, where he is set to be racing for DJK Racing for the "majority of the NASCAR Canada Series schedule".
- On 1 April 2025, M Racing announced that team owner Yvan Muller and Thomas Toffel is set to race for the team in the season opener at Valencia. Muller's cousin and the 2020 and 2021 World Touring Car Cup champion Yann Ehrlacher will also race for M Racing later in the season, as Ehrlacher is not allowed to compete in Valencia due to TCR World Tour's regulations banning drivers from participating in any other racing event held at tracks that will host a TCR World Tour event in 2025.
- On 2 April 2025, Rette Jones Racing announced the signing of both Liam Hezemans and Gil Linster from Hendriks Motorsport as the drivers for their first NASCAR Euro Series campaign in 2025.
- On 3 April 2025, Marko Stipp Motorsport announced the signing of Georgian drivers Davit Kajaia and Sandro Tavartkiladze to the #48 team for the 2025 season. Both Kajaia and Tavartkiladze are set to become EuroNASCAR's first Georgian drivers. Kajaia will race in PRO while Tavartkiladze will compete in the OPEN division, completely replacing Nick Strickler whose status for 2025 is currently unknown.
- On 4 April 2025, SpeedHouse Racing announced their signing of Giorgio Maggi for the 2025 season. Maggi will therefore make his return to the series after a year of absence, having raced in both the Italian GT Championship and Porsche Supercup throughout 2024.
- On 5 April 2025, it was announced that 2023 series champion Gianmarco Ercoli will be moving over to CAAL Racing's affiliate team Alumitec Racing for the 2025 season. He will be joined by Valentino Gambarotto, who will make his series debut in the OPEN division.
- On 6 April 2025, Lux Motorsport announced that they have signed Mario Ercoli, the younger brother of 2023 champion Gianmarco, to their OPEN team for 2025. Lux also announced that Nicole Davidson, the sister of Jack Davidson, will make her car racing debut in the Rookie Challenge division.
- On 6 April 2025, Marko Stipp Motorsport announced that Max Marzorati and Sven van Laere will be racing for the team's #47 Chevrolet Camaro in 2025. Marzorati and van Laere will both replace Victor Neumann, whose status for 2025 is currently unknown. Marzorati previously raced for Double V Racing on a part-time basis in 2024, while van Laere initially planned to race full-time with CAAL Racing in 2024 before he had to announce his retirement due to medical issues midway through the season. Despite this retirement announcement, van Laere received a medical clearance for 2025, allowing him to rejoin the series with Marko Stipp Motorsport.

==== Teams ====
- On 16 December 2024, Yvan Muller's M Racing team announced plans to enter the NASCAR Euro Series as a two-car team.
- PK Carsport will be expanding into a two full-time entry team for the first time since 2020 with the addition of the #13 team. Anthony Kumpen subsequently revealed in an interview with Autosportwereld on 6 March 2025 that PK Carsport's expansion was driven by calendar clashes between NASCAR Euro Series and Belcar, which necessitated the team's expansion to EuroNASCAR at the expense of their Belcar program.
- On 9 March 2025, Team Bleekemolen announced that they will be entering just two cars for the 2025 season, retaining only the #69 and #72 teams. The #66 team have been dissolved after it was effectively absorbed by PK Carsport during the 2024 EuroNASCAR Finals. The #11 team was dissolved due to Reza Sardeha not being able to compete in the 2025 season for business reasons.
- SpeedHouse will be expanding back into a three-car team after the team downscaled into a two-car team in 2024.
- On 2 April 2025, Rette Jones Racing announced their plans to expand to the NASCAR Euro Series in 2025. The team will field the #30 Ford Mustang with support from Hendriks Motorsport. It is later revealed during the Entry List reveal for the season opening 2025 NASCAR GP Spain that Rette Jones will take over the owner rights for Hendriks Motorsport's #50 team.
- On 5 April 2025, it was announced that Canadian outfit Alumitec Racing will be joining the series in 2025. Alumitec is founded by Alain Lord Mounir, who previously owned Go Fas Racing's EuroNASCAR and NASCAR Canada teams. Alumitec will enter a technical agreement with CAAL Racing to help them field their #11 Ford Mustang. It is later revealed during the Entry List reveal for the 2025 NASCAR GP Spain that Alumitec will be using the owner points from CAAL Racing's #54 team.
- The Entry List for the 2025 NASCAR GP Spain revealed the following changes.
  - Double V Racing, Granducato Speed, Race Art Technology, Vict Motorsport and 3F Racing will not continue their participation in the series.
  - Club Motorsport downscaled into a single-car team, retaining just the #55 Chevrolet Camaro for 2025.
  - Hendriks Motorsport downscaled into a single-car team after the owner rights for their #50 team is transferred to Rette Jones Racing.

==== Mid-season changes ====
- Club Motorsport reactivated their second team starting from the NASCAR GP Italy at Vallelunga. The second entry has been renumbered from No. 43 to No. 22.
- On 24 April 2025, it was announced that Matthias Hauer has withdrawn his entry to the 2025 season due to tore ligaments. Sven van Laere was announced as his replacement for the rest of the season.
- On 2 May 2025, Marko Stipp Motorsport announced that Davit Kajaia, Sandro Tavartkiladze and Sven van Laere have all been released on a mutual agreement after just one round. Kajaia and Tavartkiladze subsequently entered the NASCAR GP Italy with Team Georgia, a new team formed by their sponsors Georgian Automobile Sport Federation, while van Laere was signed by SpeedHouse.

== Schedule ==
The provisional calendar for the 2025 season was announced on 3 October 2024. All rounds from the 2024 season are retained with the same timeframe as the previous year, making it the first season where the series calendar is unchanged from one season to the next. In May 2025, the planned round at Raceway Venray was cancelled and not replaced, since the circuit could not get any FIA track homologation for the safety purposes.

=== PRO ===
| Round | | Race title | Track | Date |
|---|---|---|---|---|
| 1 | R1 | NASCAR GP Spain – Valencia NASCAR Fest | (Spain) Circuit Ricardo Tormo, Valencia | 12 April |
| 1 | R2 | NASCAR GP Spain – Valencia NASCAR Fest | (Spain) Circuit Ricardo Tormo, Valencia | 13 April |
| 2 | R3 | NASCAR GP Italy – American Festival of Rome | (Italy) Autodromo Vallelunga, Campagnano di Roma | 17 May |
| 2 | R4 | NASCAR GP Italy – American Festival of Rome | (Italy) Autodromo Vallelunga, Campagnano di Roma | 18 May |
| 3 | R5 | NASCAR GP UK – American SpeedFest 12, Powered by Lucas Oil | (United Kingdom) Brands Hatch (Indy), West Kingsdown | 7 June |
| 3 | R6 | NASCAR GP UK – American SpeedFest 12, Powered by Lucas Oil | (United Kingdom) Brands Hatch (Indy), West Kingsdown | 8 June |
| 4 | R7 | NASCAR GP Czech Republic | (Czech Republic) Autodrom Most, Most | 30 August |
| 4 | R8 | NASCAR GP Czech Republic | (Czech Republic) Autodrom Most, Most | 31 August |
EuroNASCAR Playoffs
| 5 | R9 | EuroNASCAR Semi-Finals – NASCAR GP Germany | (Germany) Motorsport Arena Oschersleben, Oschersleben | 20 September |
| 5 | R10 | EuroNASCAR Semi-Finals – NASCAR GP Germany | (Germany) Motorsport Arena Oschersleben, Oschersleben | 21 September |
| 6 | R11 | EuroNASCAR Finals – NASCAR GP Belgium | (Belgium) Circuit Zolder, Heusden-Zolder | 11 October |
| 6 | R12 | EuroNASCAR Finals – NASCAR GP Belgium | (Belgium) Circuit Zolder, Heusden-Zolder | 12 October |

Oval/Speedway
Road Course/Street Circuit

=== OPEN ===
| Round | | Race title | Track | Date |
|---|---|---|---|---|
| 1 | R1 | NASCAR GP Spain – Valencia NASCAR Fest | (Spain) Circuit Ricardo Tormo, Valencia | 12 April |
| 1 | R2 | NASCAR GP Spain – Valencia NASCAR Fest | (Spain) Circuit Ricardo Tormo, Valencia | 13 April |
| 2 | R3 | NASCAR GP Italy – American Festival of Rome | (Italy) Autodromo Vallelunga, Campagnano di Roma | 17 May |
| 2 | R4 | NASCAR GP Italy – American Festival of Rome | (Italy) Autodromo Vallelunga, Campagnano di Roma | 18 May |
| 3 | R5 | NASCAR GP UK – American SpeedFest 12, Powered by Lucas Oil | (United Kingdom) Brands Hatch (Indy), West Kingsdown | 7 June |
| 3 | R6 | NASCAR GP UK – American SpeedFest 12, Powered by Lucas Oil | (United Kingdom) Brands Hatch (Indy), West Kingsdown | 8 June |
| 4 | R7 | NASCAR GP Czech Republic | (Czech Republic) Autodrom Most, Most | 30 August |
| 4 | R8 | NASCAR GP Czech Republic | (Czech Republic) Autodrom Most, Most | 31 August |
EuroNASCAR Playoffs
| 5 | R9 | EuroNASCAR Semi-Finals – NASCAR GP Germany | (Germany) Motorsport Arena Oschersleben, Oschersleben | 20 September |
| 5 | R10 | EuroNASCAR Semi-Finals – NASCAR GP Germany | (Germany) Motorsport Arena Oschersleben, Oschersleben | 21 September |
| 6 | R11 | EuroNASCAR Finals – NASCAR GP Belgium | (Belgium) Circuit Zolder, Heusden-Zolder | 11 October |
| 6 | R12 | EuroNASCAR Finals – NASCAR GP Belgium | (Belgium) Circuit Zolder, Heusden-Zolder | 12 October |

Oval/Speedway
Road Course/Street Circuit

=== Rookie Challenge ===
| Round | Race title | Track | Date |
|---|---|---|---|
| 1 | NASCAR GP Spain – Valencia NASCAR Fest | (Spain) Circuit Ricardo Tormo, Valencia | 11 April |
| 2 | NASCAR GP Italy – American Festival of Rome | (Italy) Autodromo Vallelunga, Campagnano di Roma | 16 May |
| 3 | NASCAR GP Czech Republic | (Czech Republic) Autodrom Most, Most | 29 August |
EuroNASCAR Playoffs
| 4 | EuroNASCAR Semi-Finals – NASCAR GP Germany | (Germany) Motorsport Arena Oschersleben, Oschersleben | 19 September |
| 5 | EuroNASCAR Finals – NASCAR GP Belgium | (Belgium) Circuit Zolder, Heusden-Zolder | 9 October |

== Rule changes ==
- As part of NASCAR Whelen Euro Series' rebranding into NASCAR Euro Series for 2025, the series announced on 6 November 2024 that all three divisions will be rebranded starting from the 2025 season. EuroNASCAR PRO, EuroNASCAR 2, and EuroNASCAR Club Challenge will now be referred to as PRO, OPEN, and Rookie Challenge divisions respectively.
- Sequential gearboxes will now be made mandatory, having been first introduced in 2021 as an optional choice. Lithuanian transmission manufacturer Samsonas Motorsport will provide the series with 5-speed Samsonas RS90 sequential gearboxes for every competitor. The change is introduced to give drivers more options on cornering, as well as to make it in line with the sequential gearbox units that are currently in use in the NASCAR Cup Series.
- On 11 December 2024, NASCAR Euro Series announced that PRO Qualifying sessions will now be held in a single-car format. The order of drivers will be determined by the reverse order of combined practice times. OPEN's qualifying session has also been shortened from 20 minutes to 15 minutes.
- On 18 December 2024, NASCAR Euro Series announced the following changes to OPEN's trophies system, which are additional classifications that are contested within a division between drivers that are eligible for each Trophy's requirements.
  - Rookie Trophy, eligible for all debutants in the OPEN division, has been abolished. Master Trophy is introduced in its place, open to all OPEN division drivers rated as Grade C by the series.
  - The minimum age for OPEN division's Legend Trophy has been raised from 40 years old to 45 years old.
  - If a driver is eligible for multiple Trophies in a division, then they are only allowed to compete for one Trophy in addition to the overall championship standings.
- On 20 January 2025, NASCAR Euro Series announced the following changes for the Rookie Challenge division.
  - The practice for drivers from PRO and OPEN championships to enter the division in order to gain extra practice time has now been banned. Exemptions are now only made for drivers in their first full season or drivers who have not competed in more than three rounds in any previous season.
  - The minimum age has been reduced to 15 years old. PRO and OPEN maintains the minimum age limit of 16.
  - A passenger can participate in Rookie Challenge sessions as long as the team have requested prior permission to the organizers.

== Results ==
=== EuroNASCAR PRO ===
| Round | | Race | Pole position | Fastest lap | Most laps led | Winning driver | Winning team | Winning manufacturer |
|---|---|---|---|---|---|---|---|---|
| 1 | R1 | Valencia NASCAR Fest | (France) Paul Jouffreau | (Greece) Thomas Krasonis | (France) Paul Jouffreau | (France) Paul Jouffreau | (France) RDV Competition | Ford |
| 1 | R2 | Valencia NASCAR Fest | (Greece) Thomas Krasonis | (Greece) Thomas Krasonis | (Greece) Thomas Krasonis | (Greece) Thomas Krasonis | (Belgium) PK Carsport | Chevrolet |
| 2 | R3 | American Festival of Rome | (France) Paul Jouffreau | (Italy) Vittorio Ghirelli | (France) Paul Jouffreau | (France) Paul Jouffreau | (France) RDV Competition | Ford |
| 2 | R4 | American Festival of Rome | (Italy) Vittorio Ghirelli | (Netherlands) Liam Hezemans | (Italy) Vittorio Ghirelli | (Italy) Vittorio Ghirelli | (Belgium) PK Carsport | Chevrolet |
| 3 | R5 | American SpeedFest 12 | (Italy) Gianmarco Ercoli | (Netherlands) Liam Hezemans | (Italy) Gianmarco Ercoli | (Italy) Gianmarco Ercoli | (Canada) Alumitec Racing | Ford |
| 3 | R6 | American SpeedFest 12 | (Netherlands) Liam Hezemans | (Greece) Thomas Krasonis | (Netherlands) Liam Hezemans | (Italy) Gianmarco Ercoli | (Canada) Alumitec Racing | Ford |
| 4 | R7 | NASCAR GP Czech Republic | (Italy) Gianmarco Ercoli | (Italy) Vittorio Ghirelli | (Italy) Gianmarco Ercoli | (Italy) Gianmarco Ercoli | (Canada) Alumitec Racing | Ford |
| 4 | R8 | NASCAR GP Czech Republic | (Italy) Vittorio Ghirelli | (Netherlands) Liam Hezemans | (Italy) Vittorio Ghirelli | (Italy) Vittorio Ghirelli | (Belgium) PK Carsport | Chevrolet |
EuroNASCAR Playoffs
| 5 | R9 | NASCAR GP Germany | (Italy) Vittorio Ghirelli | (France) Paul Jouffreau | (Netherlands) Liam Hezemans | (Netherlands) Liam Hezemans | (United States) Rette Jones Racing | Ford |
| 5 | R10 | NASCAR GP Germany | (France) Paul Jouffreau | (Italy) Vittorio Ghirelli | (Italy) Vittorio Ghirelli | (Italy) Vittorio Ghirelli | (Belgium) PK Carsport | Chevrolet |
| 6 | R11 | NASCAR GP Belgium | (Italy) Vittorio Ghirelli | (Italy) Vittorio Ghirelli | (Italy) Vittorio Ghirelli | (Italy) Vittorio Ghirelli | (Belgium) PK Carsport | Chevrolet |
| 6 | R12 | NASCAR GP Belgium | (Italy) Vittorio Ghirelli | (France) Paul Jouffreau | (Italy) Vittorio Ghirelli | (Italy) Vittorio Ghirelli | (Belgium) PK Carsport | Chevrolet |

=== EuroNASCAR OPEN ===
| Round | | Race | Pole position | Fastest lap | Most laps led | Winning driver | Winning team | Winning manufacturer |
|---|---|---|---|---|---|---|---|---|
| 1 | R1 | Valencia NASCAR Fest | (Greece) Thomas Krasonis | (Greece) Thomas Krasonis | (Greece) Thomas Krasonis | (Greece) Thomas Krasonis | (Belgium) PK Carsport | Chevrolet |
| 1 | R2 | Valencia NASCAR Fest | (Greece) Thomas Krasonis | (Luxembourg) Gil Linster | (Czech Republic) Martin Doubek | (Czech Republic) Martin Doubek | (Netherlands) Hendriks Motorsport | Ford |
| 2 | R3 | American Festival of Rome | (Greece) Thomas Krasonis | (Greece) Thomas Krasonis | (Greece) Thomas Krasonis | (Greece) Thomas Krasonis | (Belgium) PK Carsport | Chevrolet |
| 2 | R4 | American Festival of Rome | (Greece) Thomas Krasonis | (Czech Republic) Martin Doubek | (Czech Republic) Martin Doubek | (Czech Republic) Martin Doubek | (Netherlands) Hendriks Motorsport | Ford |
| 3 | R5 | American SpeedFest 12 | (Switzerland) Thomas Toffel | (United States) Jordan O'Brien | (Netherlands) Melvin De Groot | (Netherlands) Melvin De Groot | (Netherlands) Team Bleekemolen | Toyota |
| 3 | R6 | American SpeedFest 12 | (United States) Jordan O'Brien | (Greece) Thomas Krasonis | (Czech Republic) Martin Doubek | (Czech Republic) Martin Doubek | (Netherlands) Hendriks Motorsport | Ford |
| 4 | R7 | NASCAR GP Czech Republic | (Czech Republic) Martin Doubek | (Czech Republic) Martin Doubek (Netherlands) Bruno Mulders | (United States) Jordan O'Brien | (Greece) Thomas Krasonis | (Belgium) PK Carsport | Chevrolet |
| 4 | R8 | NASCAR GP Czech Republic | (Czech Republic) Martin Doubek | (Greece) Thomas Krasonis | (Greece) Thomas Krasonis | (Greece) Thomas Krasonis | (Belgium) PK Carsport | Chevrolet |
EuroNASCAR Playoffs
| 5 | R9 | NASCAR GP Germany | (Netherlands) Bruno Mulders | (Greece) Thomas Krasonis | (Netherlands) Bruno Mulders | (Netherlands) Bruno Mulders | (Netherlands) Team Bleekemolen | Toyota |
| 5 | R10 | NASCAR GP Germany | (Greece) Thomas Krasonis | (Greece) Thomas Krasonis | (Netherlands) Bruno Mulders | (Greece) Thomas Krasonis | (Belgium) PK Carsport | Chevrolet |
| 6 | R11 | NASCAR GP Belgium | (Switzerland) Thomas Toffel | (Greece) Thomas Krasonis | (Greece) Thomas Krasonis | (Greece) Thomas Krasonis | (Belgium) PK Carsport | Chevrolet |
| 6 | R12 | NASCAR GP Belgium | (Greece) Thomas Krasonis | (Czech Republic) Martin Doubek | (Czech Republic) Martin Doubek | (Czech Republic) Martin Doubek | (Netherlands) Hendriks Motorsport | Ford |

=== EuroNASCAR Rookie Challenge ===
| Round | Race | Winning driver | Winning team | Winning manufacturer |
|---|---|---|---|---|
| 1 | Valencia NASCAR Fest | (Spain) José Antonio Peñalta | (France) SpeedHouse Racing | Ford |
| 2 | American Festival of Rome | (Spain) José Antonio Peñalta | (France) SpeedHouse Racing | Ford |
| 3 | NASCAR GP Czech Republic | (Spain) José Antonio Peñalta | (France) SpeedHouse Racing | Ford |
EuroNASCAR Playoffs
| 4 | NASCAR GP Germany | (Spain) José Antonio Peñalta | (France) SpeedHouse Racing | Ford |
| 5 | NASCAR GP Belgium | (Spain) José Antonio Peñalta | (France) SpeedHouse Racing | Ford |

=== Endurance Teams Championship ===
| Round | Race | Overall winner | EuroNASCAR PRO Driver | EuroNASCAR OPEN Driver |
|---|---|---|---|---|
| 1 | Valencia NASCAR Fest | (France) RDV Competition | (France) Paul Jouffreau | (Austria) Patrick Schober |
| 2 | American Festival of Rome | (Belgium) PK Carsport | (Italy) Vittorio Ghirelli | (France) Thomas Dombrowski |
| 3 | American SpeedFest 12 | (Netherlands) Team Bleekemolen | (Netherlands) Sebastiaan Bleekemolen | (Netherlands) Melvin De Groot |
| 4 | NASCAR GP Czech Republic | (Netherlands) Hendriks Motorsport | (Czech Republic) Martin Doubek | (Czech Republic) Martin Doubek |
EuroNASCAR Playoffs
| 5 | NASCAR GP Germany | (Italy) Academy Motorsport | (Italy) Claudio Remigio Cappelli | (Italy) Claudio Remigio Cappelli |
| 6 | NASCAR GP Belgium | (Georgia (country)) Team Georgia by RDV | (Georgia (country)) Davit Kajaia | (Georgia (country)) Sandro Tavartkiladze |

== Standings ==
Points are awarded to drivers and team using the current point system used in NASCAR Cup Series, NASCAR Xfinity Series, and NASCAR Craftsman Truck Series. The driver that gained the most positions in a race will receive 4 bonus championship points. In addition, double points are awarded for the Playoff races.

For the EuroNASCAR PRO and EuroNASCAR 2 driver's championship, only the best 8 results from the first 9 races and the results from the Playoffs at Oschersleben and Zolder will count towards the final standings. For the Club Challenge championships, points are awarded per session and the results listed from each round in the standings are the combined results. For the Teams Championship, all points will be counted with no dropped scores.

=== EuroNASCAR PRO ===
(key) Bold - Pole position awarded by fastest qualifying time (in Race 1) or by previous race's fastest lap (in Race 2). Italics - Fastest lap. * – Most laps led. ^ – Most positions gained.

| Pos | Driver | (Spain) ESP | | (Italy) ITA | | (United Kingdom) GBR | | (Czech Republic) CZE | | (Germany) GER | | (Belgium) BEL | | Points |
|---|---|---|---|---|---|---|---|---|---|---|---|---|---|---|
| 1 | (Italy) Vittorio Ghirelli | 4 | 2 | 3 | **1*** | 2 | 2 | 21 | **1*** | **13** | 1* | **1*** | **1*** | 542 |
| 2 | (Italy) Gianmarco Ercoli | 7 | 8 | 2 | 5 | **1*** | 1 | **1*** | 2 | 9 | 10 | 3 | 5 | 496 |
| 3 | (France) Paul Jouffreau | **1*** | 3 | **1*** | 6 | 22 | 3 | 9 | 4 | 3 | **2** | 24 | 6 | 480 |
| 4 | (Netherlands) Liam Hezemans | 5 | 6 | 19 | 2 | 5 | **19*** | 19 | 3 | 1* | 21 | 2 | 4 | 455 |
| 5 | (Netherlands) Sebastiaan Bleekemolen | 10 | 5 | 6 | 11 | 6 | 4 | 6 | 7 | 19 | 7 | 5 | 10 | 437 |
| 6 | (United States) Garrett Lowe | 6 | 7 | 8 | 9 | 14 | 12 | 3 | 20 | 2 | 4 | 18 | 9 | 436 |
| 7 | (Greece) Thomas Krasonis | 2 | **1*** | 5 | 3 | 16 | 5 | 4 | 11 | 8 | 23 | 4 | 19 | 435 |
| 8 | (Cyprus) Vladimiros Tziortzis | 8 | 11 | 9 | 10 | 10 | 10 | 15 | 14 | 7 | 11 | 10 | 12 | 416 |
| 9 | (Germany) Julien Rehberg | 9 | 10 | 10 | 21 | 9 | 9 | 14 | 16 | 17 | 18 | 6 | 8 | 397 |
| 10 | (Czech Republic) Martin Doubek | 21 | 22 | 4 | 4 | 11 | 11 | 2 | 6 | 18 | 3 | 11 | DNS | 388 |
| 11 | (Italy) Fabrizio Armetta | 15 | 13 | 7 | 8 | 4 | 18 | 5 | 12 | 21 | 12 | 8 | 18 | 384 |
| 12 | (United Kingdom) Jack Davidson | 20 | 9 | 20 | 18 | 3 | 6 | 7 | 21 | 14 | 9 | 12 | DNS | 374 |
| 13 | (Italy) Claudio Remigio Cappelli | 17 | 15 | 17 | 7 | 20 | 13 | 12 | 19 | 5 | 5 | 21 | DNS | 366 |
| 14 | (Georgia (country)) Davit Kajaia | 13 | 14 | 21 | 16 | 12 | 14 | 20 | 18 | 10 | 22 | 7 | 7 | 366 |
| 15 | (France) Ulysse Delsaux | 11 | 21 | 11 | 19 | 13 | 16 | 13 | 9 | 11 | 19 | 15 | 15 | 357 |
| 16 | (Switzerland) Giorgio Maggi | 18 | 19 | 16 | 13 | 8 | 8 | 8 | 17 | 16 | 13 | 14 | DNS | 354 |
| 17 | (Netherlands) Bruno Mulders | | | | 12 | 7 | 20 | 10 | 5 | 22 | 6 | 23 | 3 | 341 |
| 18 | (Switzerland) Thomas Toffel | | | | | 21 | 7 | 18 | 15 | 4 | 8 | 22 | 2 | 323 |
| 19 | (Belgium) Marc Goossens | 16 | 12 | 12 | 17 | | | | | | | 9 | 16 | 193 |
| 20 | (Italy) Federico Monti | | | | | 19 | 17 | 17 | 13 | | | 25 | 14 | 166 |
| 21 | (Japan) Kenko Miura | 12 | 20 | | | | | | | 12 | 16 | | | 144 |
| 22 | (Czech Republic) Michal Makes | | | | | | | 11 | 8 | 20 | 17 | | | 137 |
| 23 | (Italy) Max Lanza | 19 | 16 | 13 | 14 | 15 | 21 | 16 | 10 | | | 20 | DNS | 122 |
| 24 | (United Kingdom) Max Marzorati | 14 | 17 | 14 | 15 | 17 | 22 | | | | | | | 122 |
| 25 | (Canada) Raphaël Lessard | | | | | | | | | 6 | 14 | | | 108 |
| 26 | (United States) Ryan Vargas | | | | | | | | | | | 13 | 11 | 100 |
| 27 | (France) Yvan Muller | 3 | 4 | 18 | 20 | | | | | | | | | 95 |
| 28 | (Ukraine) Yevgen Sokolovsky | | | | | | | | | WD | WD | 16 | 13 | 90 |
| 29 | (Italy) Giovanni Faraonio | | | | | | | | | 15 | 20 | | | 78 |
| 30 | (United Kingdom) Chase Fernandez | | | | | | | | | | | 19 | 17 | 76 |
| 31 | (Sweden) Alexander Graff | | | | | | | | | 23 | 15 | | | 74 |
| 32 | (North Macedonia) Igor Stefanovski | | | | | | | | | | | 17 | DNS | 62 |
| 33 | (Netherlands) Michael Bleekemolen | 22 | 18 | 15 | DNS | | | | | | | | | 56 |
| 34 | (United States) Jordan Wallace | | | | | 18 | 15 | | | | | | | 41 |
| | (Italy) Dario Casio | | | | | | | | | WD | WD | | | |

=== EuroNASCAR OPEN ===
(key) Bold - Pole position awarded by fastest qualifying time (in Race 1) or by previous race's fastest lap (in Race 2). Italics - Fastest lap. * – Most laps led. ^ – Most positions gained.

| Pos | Driver | (Spain) ESP | | (Italy) ITA | | (United Kingdom) GBR | | (Czech Republic) CZE | | (Germany) GER | | (Belgium) BEL | | Points |
|---|---|---|---|---|---|---|---|---|---|---|---|---|---|---|
| 1 | (Greece) Thomas Krasonis | **1*** | **19** | **1*** | **4** | 20 | 2 | 1 | 1* | 2 | **1** | 1* | **3** | 544 |
| 2 | (Czech Republic) Martin Doubek | 18 | 1* | 15 | 1* | 6 | 1* | **4** | **2** | 7 | 7 | 2 | 1* | 511 |
| 3 | (Netherlands) Bruno Mulders | 12 | 2 | 2 | 14 | 3 | 20 | 20 | 6 | **1*** | 5* | 3 | 4 | 482 |
| 4 | (Georgia (country)) Sandro Tavartkiladze | 6 | 6 | 9 | 8 | 5 | 8 | 3 | 8 | 9 | 9 | 5 | 5 | 463 |
| 5 | (Netherlands) Melvin De Groot | 7 | 5 | 5 | 5 | 1 | 4 | 7 | 7 | 11 | 13 | 7 | 7 | 451 |
| 6 | (France) Thomas Dombrowski | 5 | 10 | 3 | 2 | 4 | 10 | 9 | 4 | 6 | 8 | 4 | 20 | 442 |
| 7 | (Austria) Patrick Schober | 3 | 8 | 6 | 3 | 7 | 3 | 5 | 21 | 22 | 2 | 19 | 6 | 430 |
| 8 | (Italy) Claudio Remigio Cappelli | 19 | 15 | 4 | 11 | 16 | 19 | 17 | 3 | 5 | 3 | 8 | 10 | 418 |
| 9 | (Switzerland) Thomas Toffel | 4 | 17 | 21 | DNS | **2** | 18 | 18 | 20 | 4 | 6 | **20** | 2 | 397 |
| 10 | (Germany) Dominique Schaak | 10 | 12 | 12 | 16 | 17 | 6 | 10 | 9 | 15 | 12 | 10 | 13 | 396 |
| 11 | (Luxembourg) Gil Linster | 2 | 4 | 17 | 17 | | | 11 | 17 | 3 | 4 | 6 | 19 | 390 |
| 12 | (France) Florian Richard | 11 | 18 | 8 | 10 | 10 | 7 | 21 | 10 | 17 | 15 | 13 | 12 | 381 |
| 13 | (Italy) Valentino Gambarotto | 16 | 9 | 10 | 18 | 19 | 11 | 19 | 18 | 12 | 11 | 9 | 8 | 375 |
| 14 | (Belgium) Andres Beers | 20 | 7 | 16 | 12 | 11 | 12 | 8 | 16 | 10 | 19 | 22 | 9 | 361 |
| 15 | (Belgium) Sven Van Laere | 13 | 14 | 14 | 13 | 18 | 13 | 14 | 13 | 19 | 18 | 16 | 15 | 341 |
| 16 | (Italy) Valerio Marzi | | | 13 | 7 | | | 6 | 22 | 14 | 21 | 21 | 11 | 278 |
| 17 | (Germany) "Happinessa" | 15 | 16 | 19 | DNS | 22 | 15 | DNS | 19 | 23 | 20 | 18 | 18 | 278 |
| 18 | (Netherlands) Michael Bleekemolen | | | | | 21 | 17 | 12 | 12 | 18 | 16 | 14 | 14 | 264 |
| 19 | (United States) Jordan O'Brien | | | | | 9 | **14** | 2* | 5 | 8 | 23 | | | 210 |
| 20 | (Italy) Davide Frulio | | | | | 13 | DNS | 13 | 11 | | | 12 | 21 | 168 |
| 21 | (Japan) Kenko Miura | 8 | 3 | | | | | | | 16 | 14 | | | 159 |
| 22 | (United States) Mike Wise | | | | | 14 | 16 | 16 | 15 | 21 | 22 | | | 153 |
| 23 | (Italy) Roberto Benedetti | 9 | 11 | 7 | 6 | 12 | DNS | | | | | | | 148 |
| 24 | (United Kingdom) Gordon Barnes | | | | | 15 | 9 | | | 20 | 17 | | | 128 |
| 25 | (Italy) Loris Cencetti | | | | | | | | | 13 | 10 | | | 102 |
| 26 | (United States) Nick Strickler | | | | | | | | | | | 11 | 17 | 92 |
| 27 | (Italy) Mario Ercoli | 17 | 20 | 18 | 9 | | | | | | | | | 88 |
| 28 | (Italy) Francesco Leogrande | | | | | | | | | | | 17 | 16 | 82 |
| 29 | (Italy) Arianna Casoli | 14 | 13 | 20 | DNS | | | | | | | | | 74 |
| 30 | (Netherlands) Reza Sardeha | | | | | | | | | | | 15 | DNS | 64 |
| 31 | (United Kingdom) Matthew Ellis | | | | | 8* | 5 | | | | | | | 61 |
| 32 | (Italy) Giovanni Faraonio | | | 11 | 15 | | | | | | | | | 52 |
| 33 | (Monaco) Fabrice Pantani | | | | | | | 15 | 14 | | | | | 45 |
| | (Spain) José Antonio Peñalta | | | | | | | | | WD | WD | | | |
| | (France) Ulysse Delsaux | | | | | | | | | | | WD | WD | |

=== Rookie Challenge ===
| Pos | Driver | (Spain) ESP | (Italy) ITA | (Czech Republic) CZE | (Germany) GER | (Belgium) BEL | Points |
|---|---|---|---|---|---|---|---|
| 1 | (Spain) José Antonio Peñalta | 1 | 1 | | | | 73 |
| 2 | (Belgium) Maxim van Laere | 2 | 6 | | | | 72 |
| 3 | (Netherlands) Bruno Mulders | 3 | 11 | | | | 72 |
| 4 | (Portugal) Nuño Caetano | 4 | 4 | | | | 66 |
| 5 | (Italy) Federico Monti | 5 | 8 | | | | 64 |
| 6 | (Austria) Andreas Kuchelbacher | 6 | 2 | | | | 62 |
| 7 | (Italy) Daniil Shapka | 7 | 3 | | | | 60 |
| 8 | (Portugal) Yann Cristovao | 8 | 9 | | | | 59 |
| 9 | (Switzerland) Yann Schar | 9 | | | | | 57 |
| 10 | (United States) Mike Wise | 10 | 7 | | | | 57 |
| 11 | (Germany) "Happinessa" | 11 | 12 | | | | 51 |
| 12 | (United Kingdom) Nicole Davidson | 12 | 10 | | | | 51 |
| 13 | (Italy) Davide Frulio | 13 | 5 | | | | 51 |
| 14 | (United Kingdom) Daniel Boys | 14 | | | | | 46 |

=== Endurance Teams Championship (Top 15) ===
| Pos | No. | Team | EuroNASCAR PRO Driver(s) | EuroNASCAR OPEN Driver(s) | (Spain) ESP | (Italy) ITA | (United Kingdom) GBR | (Czech Republic) CZE | (Germany) GER | (Belgium) BEL | Points |
|---|---|---|---|---|---|---|---|---|---|---|---|
| 1 | | | | | | | | | | | |

== See also ==
- 2025 NASCAR Cup Series
- 2025 NASCAR Xfinity Series
- 2025 NASCAR Craftsman Truck Series
- 2025 ARCA Menards Series
- 2025 ARCA Menards Series East
- 2025 ARCA Menards Series West
- 2025 NASCAR Whelen Modified Tour
- 2025 NASCAR Canada Series
- 2025 NASCAR Mexico Series
- 2025 NASCAR Brasil Series
- 2025 CARS Tour
- 2025 SMART Modified Tour
