= Vittorio Ghirelli =

Italian racing driver (born 1994)

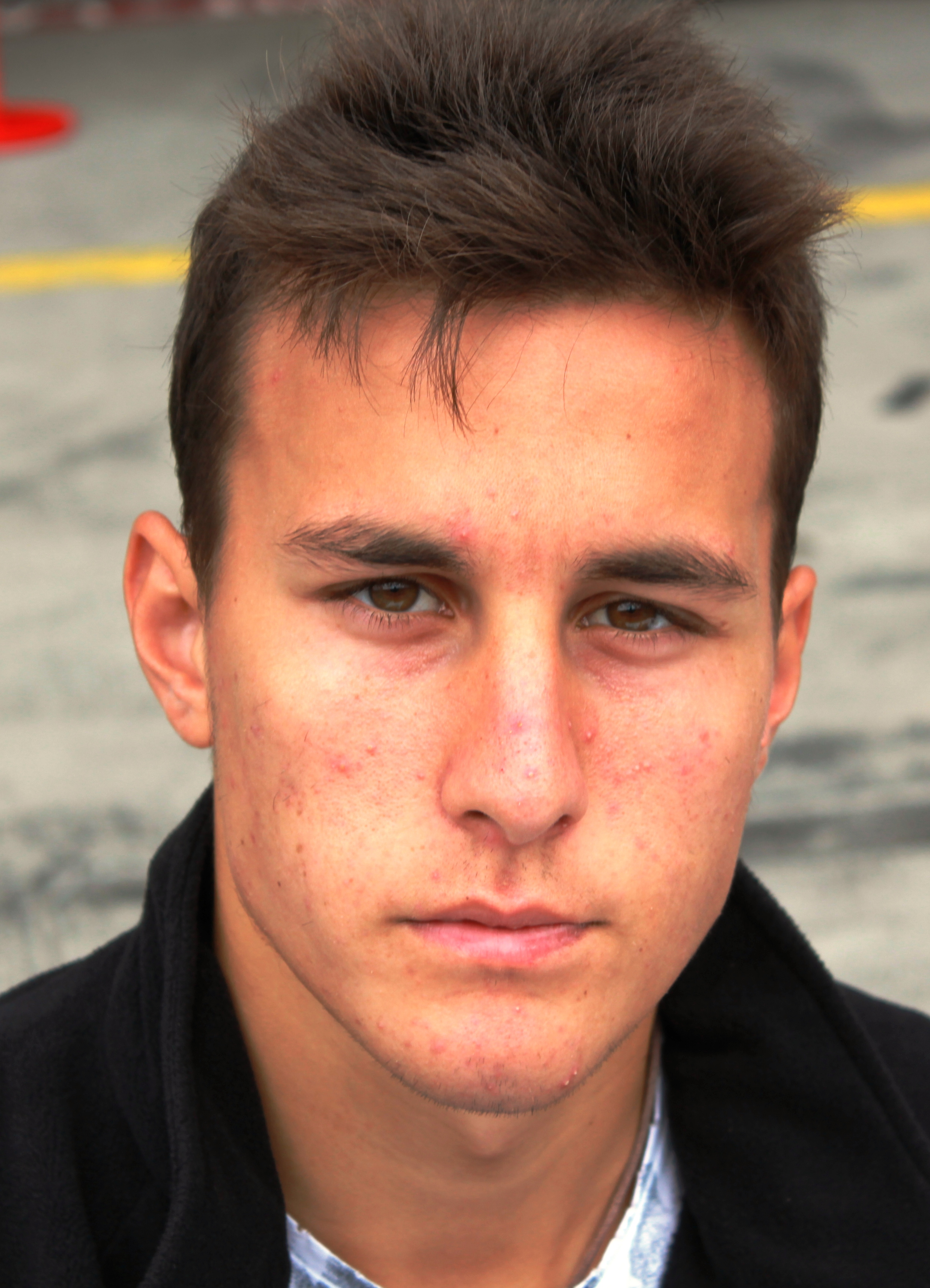
- Ghirelli in 2012
- Nationality: (Italy) Italian
- Born: 9 May 1994 (age 32) Fasano, Italy

NASCAR Whelen Euro Series career
- Debut season: 2019
- Current team: PK Carsport
- Categorisation: FIA Gold (until 2019); FIA Silver (2020–)
- Car number: 24
- Former teams: Racers Motorsport, Hendriks Motorsport, Not Only Motorsport, Team Bleekemolen
- Starts: 80
- Wins: 21
- Poles: 23
- Fastest laps: 15
- Best finish: 1st in 2020, 2024-2025

Previous series
- 2017 2015 2014 2013–14 2012 2010–11 2011 2011 2010: Italian GT Championship; Renault Sport Trophy; Indy Lights; Auto GP; Formula Renault 3.5 Series; GP3 Series; Eurocup Formula Renault 2.0; Formula Renault 2.0 Alps; Italian Formula Three

Championship titles
- 2024-2025 2020 2019 2013: EuroNASCAR Pro; EuroNASCAR 2 Smart EQ fortwo e-cup Auto GP

Vittorio Ghirelli (born 9 May 1994 in Fasano) is an Italian racing driver that currently competes in the NASCAR Euro Series for PK Carsport in the Elite 2 division, and the Smart EQ Fortwo E-Cup, where he is currently the series' defending champion. He also competes part time in the NASCAR Canada Series, driving the No. 50 for Dumoulin Compétition. Ghirelli won the Auto GP championship in 2013 for Super Nova International. He also previously competed in series such as Italian Formula Three, GP3 Series, and Indy Lights.

== Racing record ==
=== Career summary ===
Season	Series	Team	Races	Wins	Poles	F/Laps	Podiums	Points	Position
2010	GP3 Series	Atech CRS GP	14	0	0	0	0	0	34th
2010	Italian Formula 3 Championship	Team Ghinzani	2	0	0	0	0	0	23rd
2010	Italian Formula 3 Championship	EuroInternational	4	0	0	0	0	0	23rd
2010	Italian Formula 3 Championship	BVM – Target Racing	2	0	0	0	0	0	23rd
2010	Formula Renault 2.0 Italia	One Racing	2	0	0	0	0	38	20th
2010	Formula 3 Brazil Open	Cesário Fórmula	1	0	0	0	0	N/A	5th
2011	GP3 Series	Jenzer Motorsport	12	0	0	0	0	0	25th
2011	GP3 Series	Addax Team	2	0	0	0	0	0	25th
2011	Eurocup Formula Renault 2.0	One Racing	14	0	0	0	0	1	23rd
2011	Formula Renault 2.0 Alps	One Racing	9	0	0	0	3	128	9th
2012	FIA Formula Two Championship	MotorSport Vision	2	0	0	0	0	12	14th
2012	Formula Renault 3.5 Series	Comtec Racing	17	0	0	0	0	5	24th
2013	GP2 Series	Venezuela GP Lazarus	10	0	0	0	0	1	27th
2013	Auto GP Series	Super Nova International	16	2	1	5	11	222	**1st**
2014	Auto GP Series	Super Nova International	4	0	0	0	2	44	9th
2014	Auto GP Series	FMS Racing	2	0	0	0	0	44	9th
2014	Indy Lights	Team Moore Racing	4	0	0	0	0	90	13th
2015	Renault Sport Trophy - Elite	Zele Racing	6	0	0	0	1	46	9th
2015	Renault Sport Trophy - Endurance	Zele Racing	4	0	0	0	0	1	21st
2017	Italian GT Championship - Super GT3 Pro	Audi Sport Italia	14	1	0	0	4	114	9th
2019	NASCAR Whelen Euro Series - Elite 2	Racers Motorsport	6	0	0	0	2	488	**3rd**
2019	NASCAR Whelen Euro Series - Elite 2	PK Carsport	7	1	0	0	2	488	**3rd**
2020	NASCAR Whelen Euro Series - EuroNASCAR 2	Hendriks Motorsport	10	5	4	4	7	419	**1st**
2021	NASCAR Whelen Euro Series - EuroNASCAR PRO	Hendriks Motorsport-MOMO	10	1	1	2	2	381	5th
2021	NASCAR Whelen Euro Series - EuroNASCAR PRO	Not Only Motorsport	2	0	0	0	1	381	5th
2022	NASCAR Whelen Euro Series - EuroNASCAR PRO	Not Only Motorsport	12	0	1	0	2	283	13th
2023	NASCAR Whelen Euro Series - EuroNASCAR PRO	Team Bleekemolen	12	2	1	1	4	391	**3rd**
2024	NASCAR Whelen Euro Series - EuroNASCAR PRO	PK Carsport	13	7	10	4	9	555	**1st**
2025	NASCAR Euro Series - PRO	PK Carsport	12	5	5	4	9	542	**1st**
2025	NASCAR Canada Series	Dumoulin Compétition	1	0	0	0	0	19	60th
2026	NASCAR Euro Series - V8GP	PK Carsport	12	3	0	0	5	495	**1st**
2026	NASCAR Canada Series	Dumoulin Compétition	1	0	0	0	0	35	52nd

^{*} Season still in progress.

=== Complete GP3 Series results ===
(key) (Races in bold indicate pole position) (Races in italics indicate fastest lap)

Year	Entrant	1	2	3	4	5	6	7	8	9	10	11	12	13	14	15	16	DC	Points
2010	ATECH CRS GP	CAT; FEA; DNS	CAT; SPR; DNS	IST; FEA; 17	IST; SPR; 26	VAL; FEA; 20	VAL; SPR; 22	SIL; FEA; 20	SIL; SPR; 21	HOC; FEA; 15	HOC; SPR; 16	HUN; FEA; 24	HUN; SPR; 15	SPA; FEA; Ret	SPA; SPR; Ret	MNZ; FEA; 23	MNZ; SPR; 21	34th	0
2011	Jenzer Motorsport	IST; FEA; 25	IST; SPR; Ret	CAT; FEA; 9	CAT; SPR; 8	VAL; FEA; 13	VAL; SPR; 9	SIL; FEA; 14	SIL; SPR; 22	NÜR; FEA; 13	NÜR; SPR; 11	HUN; FEA; 22	HUN; SPR; Ret	SPA; FEA	SPA; SPR			25th	0
2011	Addax Team															MNZ; FEA; Ret	MNZ; SPR; 18	25th	0

=== Complete Formula Renault 2.0 Alps Series results ===
(key) (Races in bold indicate pole position; races in italics indicate fastest lap)

Year	Team	1	2	3	4	5	6	7	8	9	10	11	12	13	14	Pos	Points
2011	One Racing	MNZ; 1; 9	MNZ; 2; 16	IMO; 1	IMO; 2	PAU; 1	PAU; 2	RBR; 1; 20	RBR; 2; 8	HUN; 1; 3	HUN; 2; 9	LEC; 1; 3	LEC; 2; 2	SPA; 1 DNS	SPA; 2; 8	9th	128

=== Complete Eurocup Formula Renault 2.0 results ===
(key) (Races in bold indicate pole position; races in italics indicate fastest lap)

Year	Entrant	1	2	3	4	5	6	7	8	9	10	11	12	13	14	DC	Points
2011	One Racing	ALC; 1; 12	ALC; 2; 16	SPA; 1 Ret	SPA; 2; 20	NÜR; 1; 12	NÜR; 2 Ret	HUN; 1; 17	HUN; 2; 16	SIL; 1; 17	SIL; 2; 10	LEC; 1; 30	LEC; 2; 31	CAT; 1; 15	CAT; 2; 21	23rd	1

=== Complete Formula Renault 3.5 Series results ===
(key) (Races in bold indicate pole position) (Races in italics indicate fastest lap)

Year	Team	1	2	3	4	5	6	7	8	9	10	11	12	13	14	15	16	17	Pos	Points
2012	Comtec Racing	ALC; 1; 12	ALC; 2; 17	MON; 1; 16	SPA; 1; 20	SPA; 2 Ret	NÜR; 1 Ret	NÜR; 2 Ret	MSC; 1; 11	MSC; 2 Ret	SIL; 1; 8	SIL; 2; 10	HUN; 1; 21	HUN; 2; 17	LEC; 1; 17	LEC; 2; 23	CAT; 1; 20	CAT; 2; 19	24th	5

=== Complete Auto GP results ===
(key) (Races in bold indicate pole position) (Races in italics indicate fastest lap)

Year	Entrant	1	2	3	4	5	6	7	8	9	10	11	12	13	14	15	16	Pos	Points
2013	Super Nova International	MNZ; 1; 4	MNZ; 2; 3	MAR; 1; 9	MAR; 2; 2	**HUN**; **1**; 2	HUN; 2; 1	SIL; 1; 2	SIL; 2 Ret	MUG; 1; 6	MUG; 2; 2	NÜR; 1; 3	NÜR; 2; 2	DON; 1; 1	DON; 2; 4	**BRN**; **2**; 2	BRN; 2; 3	**1st**	**222**
2014	Super Nova International	MAR; 1	MAR; 2	LEC; 1	LEC; 2	HUN; 1; 8	HUN; 2; 2	MNZ; 1	MNZ; 2							EST; 1; 2	EST; 2 Ret	9th	44
2014	FMS Racing									IMO; 1; 10	IMO; 2; 6	RBR; 1	RBR; 2	NÜR; 1	NÜR; 2			9th	44

=== Complete GP2 Series results ===
(key) (Races in bold indicate pole position) (Races in italics indicate fastest lap)

Year	Entrant	1	2	3	4	5	6	7	8	9	10	11	12	13	14	15	16	17	18	19	20	21	22	DC	Points
2013	Venezuela GP Lazarus	SEP; FEA	SEP; SPR	BHR; FEA	BHR; SPR	CAT; FEA	CAT; SPR	MON; FEA	MON; SPR	SIL; FEA	SIL; SPR	NÜR; FEA	NÜR; SPR	HUN; FEA; 17	HUN; SPR; 17	SPA; FEA; 18	SPA; SPR; 18	MNZ; FEA; 10	MNZ; SPR; 20	MRN; FEA; Ret	MRN; SPR; 19	YMC; FEA; Ret	YMC; SPR; 19	27th	1

=== American open–wheel racing results ===
==== Indy Lights ====
Year	Team	1	2	3	4	5	6	7	8	9	10	11	12	13	14	Rank	Points	Ref
2014	Team Moore Racing	STP; 4	LBH; 12	ALA; 8	ALA; 11	IND	IND	INDY	POC	TOR	MOH	MOH	MIL	SNM	SNM	**13th**	**90**	

=== Complete NASCAR results ===
==== Euro Series – EuroNASCAR PRO ====
(key) (Bold – Pole position. Italics – Fastest lap. * – Most laps led. ^ – Most positions gained)

NASCAR Euro Series – EuroNASCAR PRO results
Year	Team	No.	Make	1	2	3	4	5	6	7	8	9	10	11	12	13	NES	Points
2021	Hendriks Motorsport-MOMO	50	Ford	ESP; 6	ESP; 4	GBR; 4	GBR; 6	CZE; 4	**CZE**; 1*	CRO; 2	CRO; 4	BEL; 4	BEL; 5				5th	381
2021	Not Only Motorsport	90	Chevy											ITA; 2	ITA; 19		5th	381
2022	Not Only Motorsport	36	Ford	ESP; 25	ESP; 32	GBR; 31	GBR; 10	ITA; 3	ITA; 18	CZE; 11^	CZE; 5	**BEL**; 2	BEL; 19	CRO; 21	CRO; 15		13th	283
2023	Team Bleekemolen	72	Chevy	ESP; 4	ESP; 16	GBR; 2	GBR; 14	ITA; 5	ITA; 1*	**CZE**; 1*	**CZE**; 2	GER; 4*	GER; 4	BEL; 6	BEL; 13		3rd	391
2024	PK Carsport	24	Chevy	**ESP**; 1	**ESP**; 2*	**ITA**; 1*	**ITA**; 1*	**GBR**; 1*	GBR; 7	**NED**; 4	**CZE**; 1*	CZE; 2	**GER**; 8	**GER**; 1*	**BEL**; 1*	BEL; 10	1st	555
2025	PK Carsport	24	Chevy	ESP; 4	ESP; 2	ITA; 3	**ITA**; 1*	GBR; 2	GBR; 2	CZE; 21	**CZE**; 1*	**GER**; 13	GER; 1*	**BEL**; 1*	BEL; 1*		1st	462
2026	PK Carsport	24	Chevy	ESP; 3	ESP; 1	FRA; 1	FRA; 4	GBR; 1	GBR; 4	CZE; 4	CZE; 17	ITA; 7	ITA; 3	BEL; 7	BEL; 10		1st	495

==== Whelen Euro Series – EuroNASCAR 2 ====
NASCAR Whelen Euro Series – EuroNASCAR 2 results
Year	Team	No.	Make	1	2	3	4	5	6	7	8	9	10	11	12	13	NWES	Points
2019	Racers Motorsport	9	Ford	VAL; 2	VAL; 3	FRA; 6	FRA; 5	BRH; 4	BRH; 10								3rd	488
2019	PK Carsport	11	Chevy							MOS; 7	MOS; 3						3rd	488
2019	PK Carsport	24	Chevy									VEN; 1*	HOC; 25	HOC; 14^	ZOL; 4	ZOL; 4	3rd	488
2020	Hendriks Motorsport	18	Ford	ITA; 2	ITA; 4	ZOL; 7	ZOL; 2	**MOS**; 1*	**MOS**; 1*	**VAL**; 1*	**VAL**; 1*	ESP; 16	ESP; 1*				1st	419

Sporting positions
Preceded by Adrian Quaife-Hobbs	Auto GP; Champion; 2013	Succeeded by Kimiya Sato
Preceded by Lasse Sørensen (Elite 2)	NASCAR Whelen Euro Series; EuroNASCAR 2 Champion; 2020	Succeeded by Martin Doubek
Preceded by Gianmarco Ercoli	NASCAR Whelen Euro Series; EuroNASCAR PRO Champion; 2024-2025	Succeeded by Incumbent
