= Garrett Lowe =

American racing driver (born 2001)

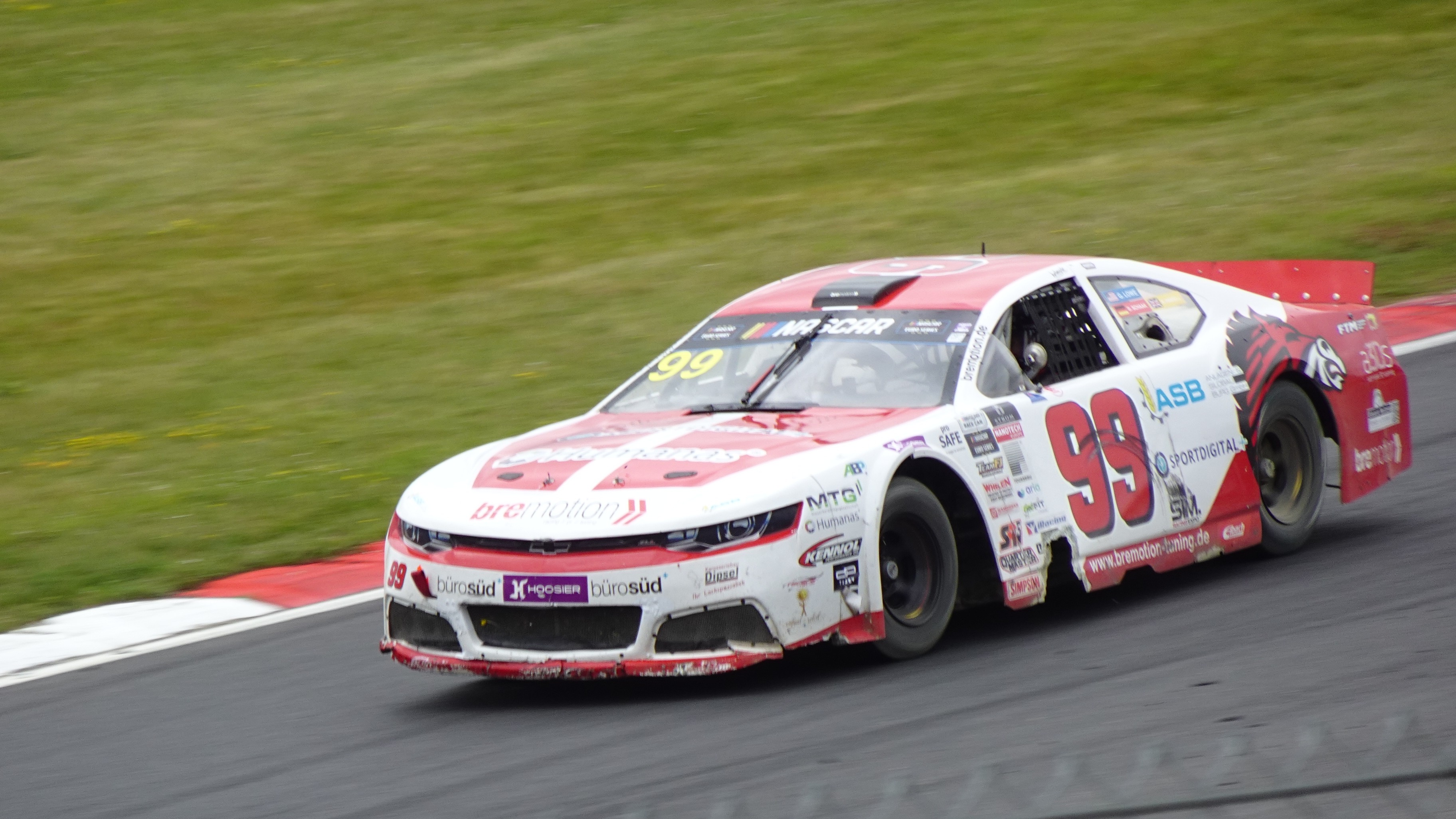
- Lowe's No. 99 car at Brands Hatch in 2026
- Born: November 1, 2001 (age 25) Gastonia, North Carolina, US

NASCAR Euro Series career
- Debut season: 2025
- Current team: BS+Bremotion
- Car number: 99
- Wins: 0
- Poles: 1
- Best finish: 6th in 2025

Garrett Lowe (born November 1, 2001) is an American racing driver who currently competes in the NASCAR Euro Series driving the No. 99 for BS+Bremotion. Lowe also competes in the eNASCAR Coca-Cola iRacing Series for BS+COMPETITION.

== Career ==
Lowe started his racing career in 2016 driving Bandoleros. Lowe switched to legends cars in 2018 and won the INEX National Championship Semi-Pro division in 2021. He raced at the 2022 Cook Out Summer Shootout at Charlotte Motor Speedway, finishing the season third place in points.

Lowe tested a EuroNASCAR car at the Circuits de Vendée in 2024 for the NASCAR Euro Series Driver Recruitment Tests. Lowe signed with Bremotion Racing for 2025 and finished in sixth and seventh place in his debut at Circuit Ricardo Tormo, also becoming the first driver to race in the eNASCAR Coca-Cola iRacing Series and NASCAR Euro Series at the same time. Lowe was the first American to score a podium in the NASCAR Euro Series since Bobby Labonte in 2018. Re-signing with Bremotion for 2026, Lowe scored his first pole position in wet conditions at Brands Hatch.

Lowe also races in the eNASCAR Coca-Cola iRacing Series. He won two races in 2023 and was the first driver to qualify for the championship round.

== Personal life ==
Lowe graduated from the University of North Carolina at Charlotte in 2024 with a Bachelor of Science in mechanical engineering.

== Racing record ==
=== Complete NASCAR results ===
==== Euro Series – V8GP ====
(key) (Bold – Pole position. Italics – Fastest lap. * – Most laps led. ^ – Most positions gained)

NASCAR Euro Series – EuroNASCAR PRO results
Year	Team	No.	Make	1	2	3	4	5	6	7	8	9	10	11	12	NES	Points	Ref
2025	Bremotion	99	Chevy	ESP; 6	ESP; 7	ITA; 8	ITA; 9	GBR; 14	GBR; 12	CZE; 3	CZE; 20	GER; 2	GER; 4	BEL; 18	BEL; 9	6th	436	
2026	BS+Bremotion	99	Chevy	ESP; 7	ESP; 2	FRA; 7	FRA; 13	**GBR**; 5	GBR; 16	CZE	CZE	ITA	ITA	BEL	BEL	2nd*	154	

^{*} Season still in progress.
