= Thomas Krasonis =

Greek racing driver

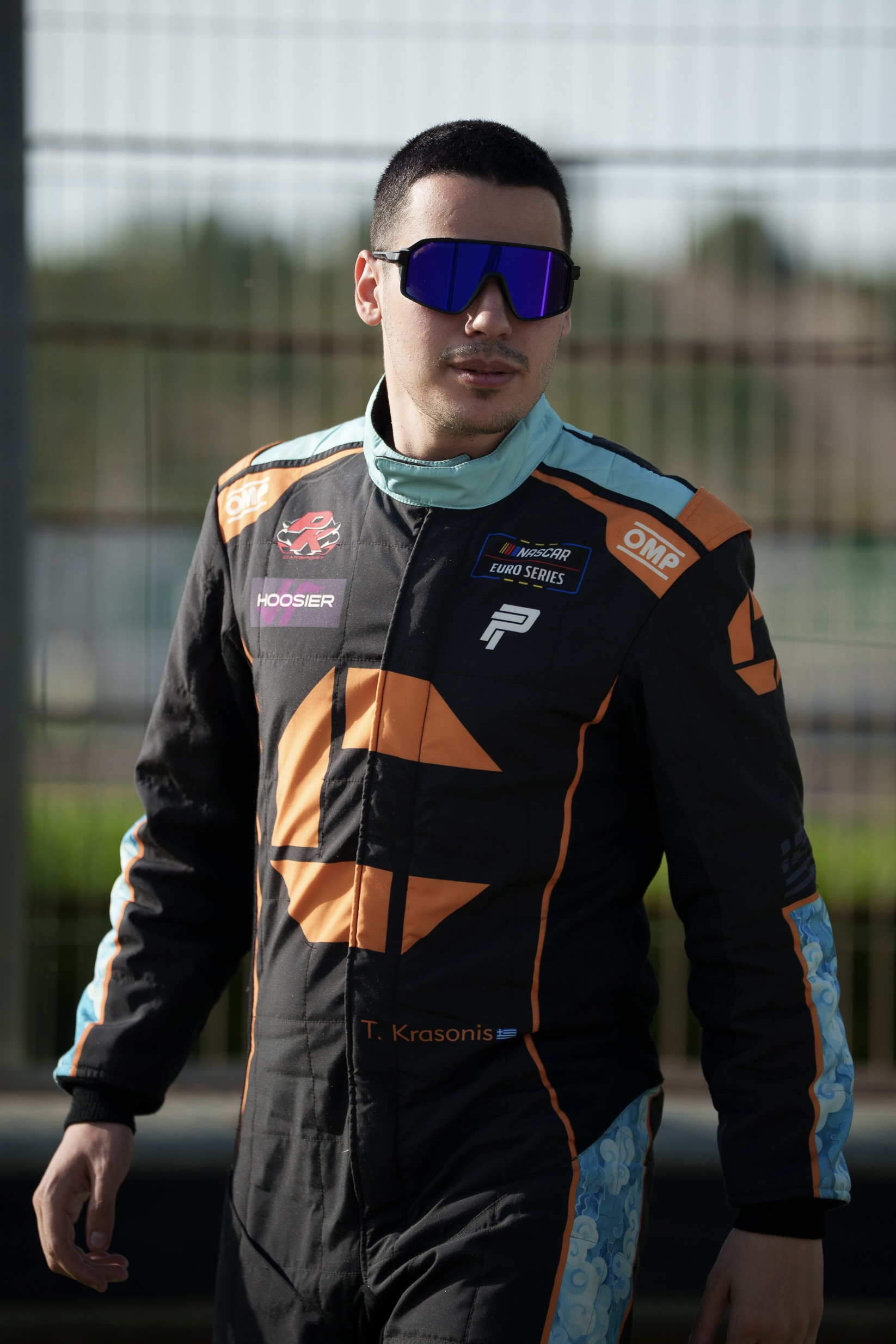
- Krasonis at the NASCAR Euro Series in 2026
- Nationality: (Greece) Greek
- Born: Thomas Krasonis; October 29, 2001 (age 25) Athens, Greece

NASCAR Whelen Euro Series career
- Debut season: 2019
- Current team: PK Carsport
- Car number: 13
- Starts: 103
- Championships: 1 (2025)
- Wins: 7
- Podiums: 19
- Poles: 11
- Fastest laps: 14
- Best finish: 1st in 2025

Previous series
- 2018 2016-2017 2006-2015: MINI JCW Championship; Junior Saloon Car Championship; Karting

Championship titles
- 2025: EuroNASCAR OPEN

Thomas Krasonis (born October 29, 2001) is a Greek professional racing driver. He competes in the NASCAR Euro Series, driving the No. 13 car for PK Carsport. He is the 2025 OPEN European Champion of the NASCAR Euro Series, having won the title in 2025. He is the first Greek professional NASCAR driver. He is also the NASCAR Euro Series ambassador for Greece.

== Early life and education ==
Krasonis was born on 29 October 2001 in Athens, Greece, where he grew up and started racing. He began his karting career in 2006 at the age of five. He competed in local karting events in Greece, a country with limited racing infrastructure. Progressing through national and international karting championships throughout his teenage years, Krasonis made the transition to car racing in 2016. In 2020, he did not race because of the COVID-19 pandemic. During this period, he focused on his studies at Hanze University of Applied Sciences in Groningen, Netherlands, majoring in Sport Science & Management. Krasonis has credited this period with providing insights into sports administration and athlete development.

== Junior racing career ==
Krasonis's junior racing career progressed from national karting competitions to international events, laying the groundwork for his transition to car racing. From 2009 to 2011, Krasonis competed in the Greek National Karting Championship. Seeking broader challenges, he ventured abroad participating in the World Karting Series from 2011 to 2012, followed by the Rhein-Main Germany Kart Cup in 2013–2014. His karting career concluded in the 2015 Winterpokal Kerpen ADAC German Championship, before he moved to European car racing.

In 2016, Krasonis debuted in car racing with the Junior Saloon Car Championship in the United Kingdom, a series featuring production-based cars. He competed in the championship through 2017. In 2018, he competed in the MINI Challenge Italy, driving MINI John Cooper Works cars. In 2019, he made the switch to V8-powered stock cars of the official NASCAR racing competition of Europe, the NASCAR Whelen Euro Series.

== NASCAR career ==
Krasonis made his NASCAR Whelen Euro Series debut in 2019. In 2020, Krasonis did not race due to the COVID-19 pandemic. In 2021, he returned with Academy Motorsport, to race in the Elite 2 category. In 2022, Krasonis competed in the EuroNASCAR PRO Championship. In 2023, he expanded to the United States, as he raced a late model at New Smyrna Speedway during Speedweeks to gain experience on American oval tracks. He later drove for racing team Marko Stipp Motorsport in Europe.

The 2024 season included further appearances in the World Series of Asphalt in the United States, alongside commitments in the V8 Oval Series and both classes of the EuroNASCAR series in Europe. Krasonis began being coached by four-time European Champion Alon Day during that year.

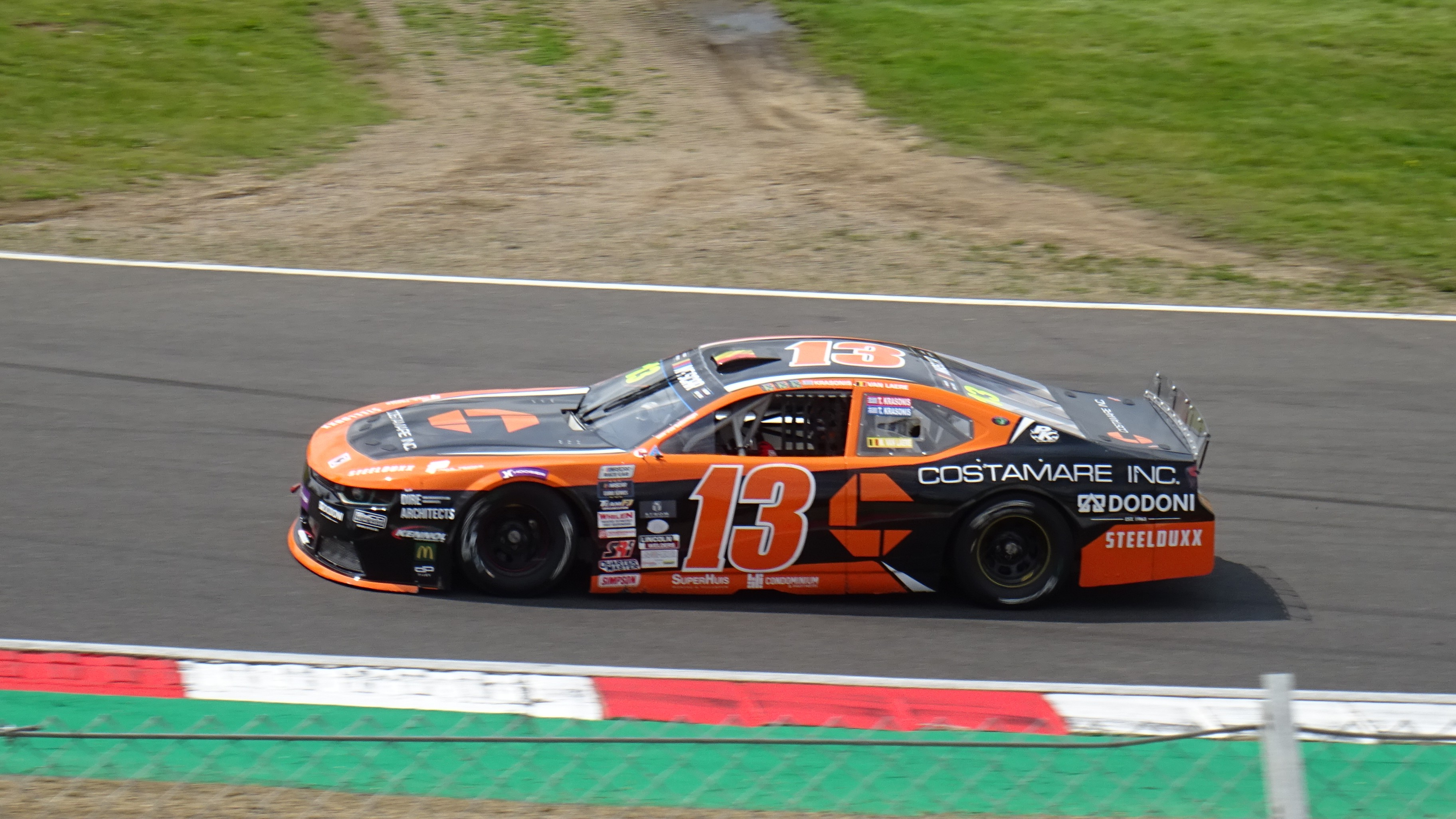
Krasonis in the 2025 EuroNASCAR race season

In 2025, Krasonis signed with racing team PK Carsport to drive the No. 13 Chevrolet Camaro in both the PRO and OPEN divisions of the NASCAR Euro Series. The team was led by two-time European Champion Anthony Kumpen. Krasonis unveiled his plans at Megara Circuit near Athens, where he became the first driver to demonstrate a EuroNASCAR car in Greece and was appointed as series ambassador.

The 2025 season began with a double victory for Krasonis at the Circuit Ricardo Tormo in Valencia, Spain on 12–13 April, including his first win in the PRO division. Across the season, he secured seven wins and twelve podium finishes in the PRO and OPEN categories combined, along with setting a lap record at Brands Hatch. On 12 October at Circuit Zolder in Belgium, Krasonis clinched the OPEN Championship, becoming the first Greek driver to win a major European motorsport title. He also became the first Greek driver to win the NASCAR Euro Series OPEN Division Championship. A maiden OPEN division victory at Valencia, was followed by five further wins over the course of the OPEN campaign, to clinch the championship.

In November 2025, Krasonis attended the annual NASCAR Awards ceremony in Charlotte, North Carolina, for the first time in his career. He was honoured alongside the other 2025 international NASCAR champions and inducted into the Whelen Hall of Champions at the NASCAR Hall of Fame. These developments marked the conclusion of Krasonis’s 2025 racing season and confirmed his status as a full-time contender in the NASCAR Euro Series PRO category heading into 2026.

=== EuroNASCAR brand ambassadorship ===
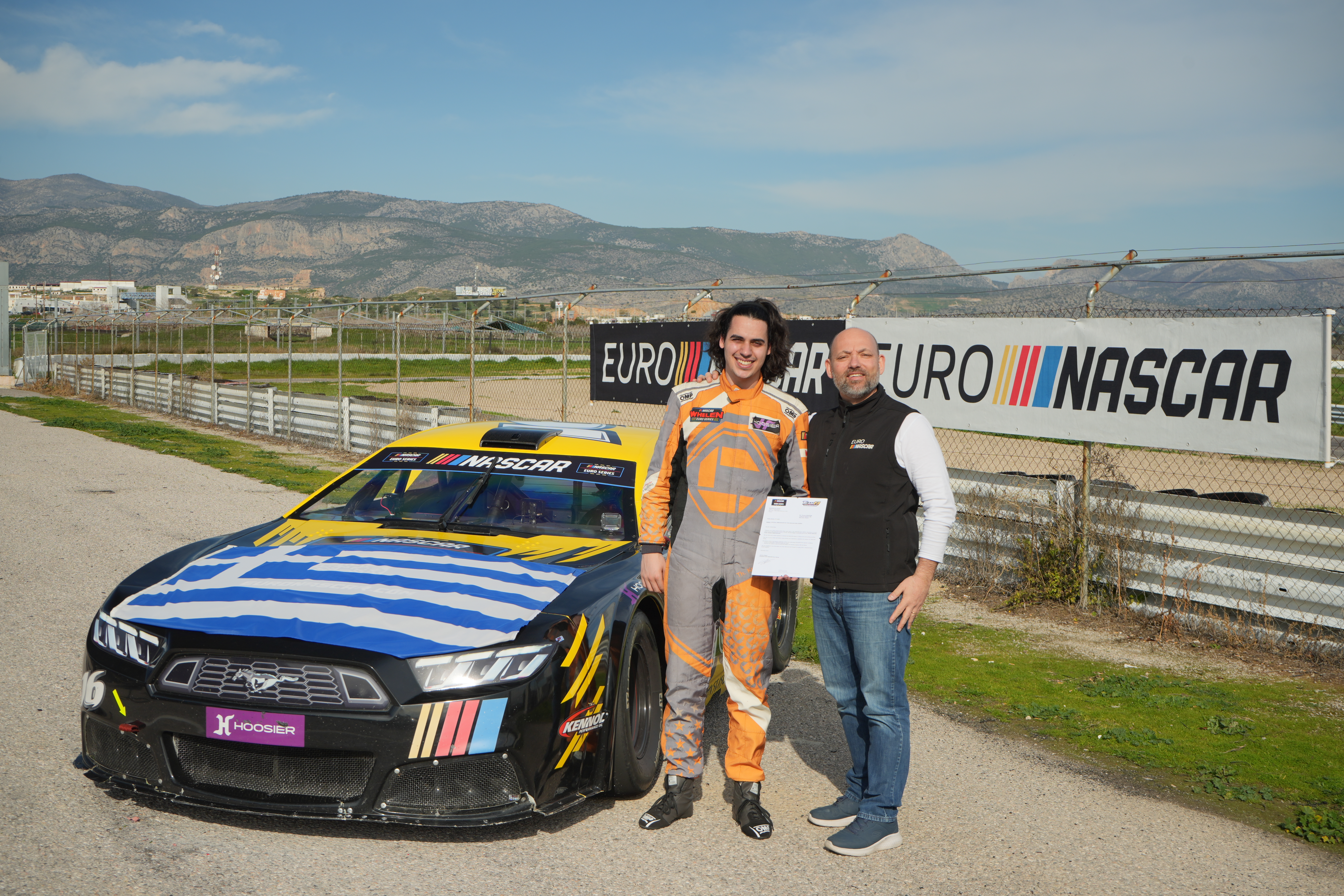
Krasonis in 2025 being presented the EuroNASCAR Ambassadorship from NASCAR Euro Series CEO Jerome Galpin

In January 2025, Krasonis was appointed as the EuroNASCAR Brand Ambassador for Greece by series CEO Jerome Galpin at a launch event held at the Megara Circuit near Athens. The event included the first public demonstration of a EuroNASCAR-spec V8 stock car in Greece, with Krasonis conducting exhibition runs for attending media and spectators. The appointment reflected Krasonis's racing achievements and was intended to support the promotion of the series in Greece, a country that had not previously hosted NASCAR-sanctioned events.

As ambassador for the NASCAR Euro Series, his role includes promoting the series in Greece and around Europe. Further, it involves participating in events and representing the series at various motorsport functions. Following his victory in the 2025 OPEN Championship, he collaborated with Greek media networks to broadcast highlights of the title-clinching weekend at Zolder, where the Greek national anthem was played on the podium. The ambassadorship has been credited with increasing visibility of stock car racing in Greece.

=== 2026 race season ===
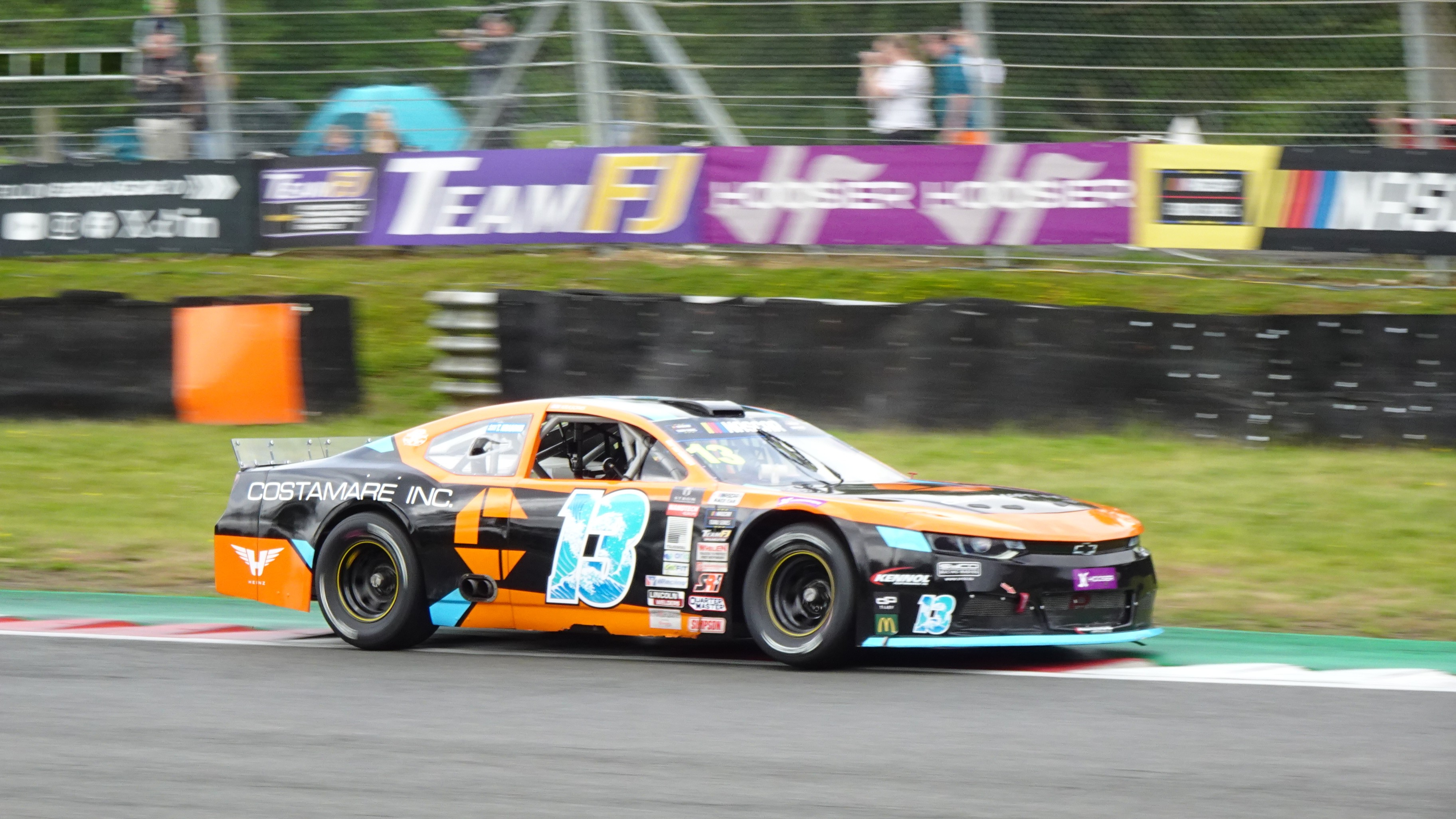
Krasonis at Brands Hatch in 2026

In October 2025, Krasonis signed a contract extension with PK Carsport to compete full-time in the NASCAR Euro Series for the 2026 season. He moved exclusively to the V8GP division, forgoing participation in the OPEN division, with the aim of contending for the premier European NASCAR series championship.

Krasonis finished fifth in the 2026 V8GP championship with 453 points, level with Jordan O'Brien, who placed fourth on a tiebreak. He also finished second in the Junior Trophy standings. He also earned the Pole Award for recording the most pole positions in V8GP qualifying. The season concluded at Circuit Zolder in Belgium on 18 October 2026.
