= Happinessa =

German racing driver (born 1990)

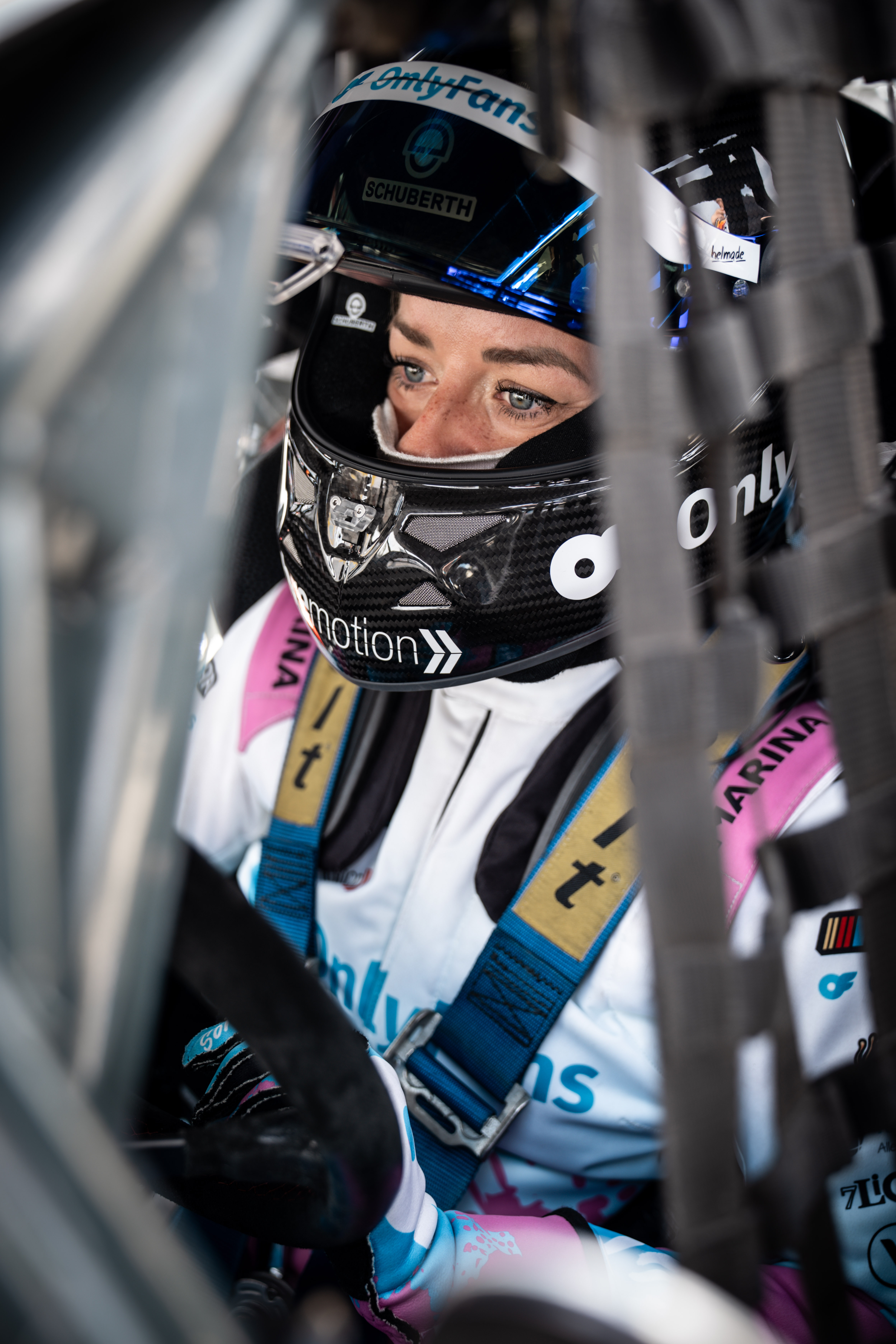

Vanessa Neumann (born January 4, 1990, in Kirchheimbolanden) is a German racing driver under the pseudonym Happinessa.

== Life and career ==
Neumann grew up in Schneckenhausen, Palatinate. In 2018, she moved to Mannheim before emigrating to Madeira in 2021. Previously, she worked as an administrative clerk in the Kaiserslautern district and in the public sector in the financial sector for over ten years.

Neumann participated in the RTL show Ninja Warrior Germany in 2018 and in Big Bounce – The Trampoline Show in 2019. She was Playmate of the Month in the April 2025 issue of German Playboy magazine.

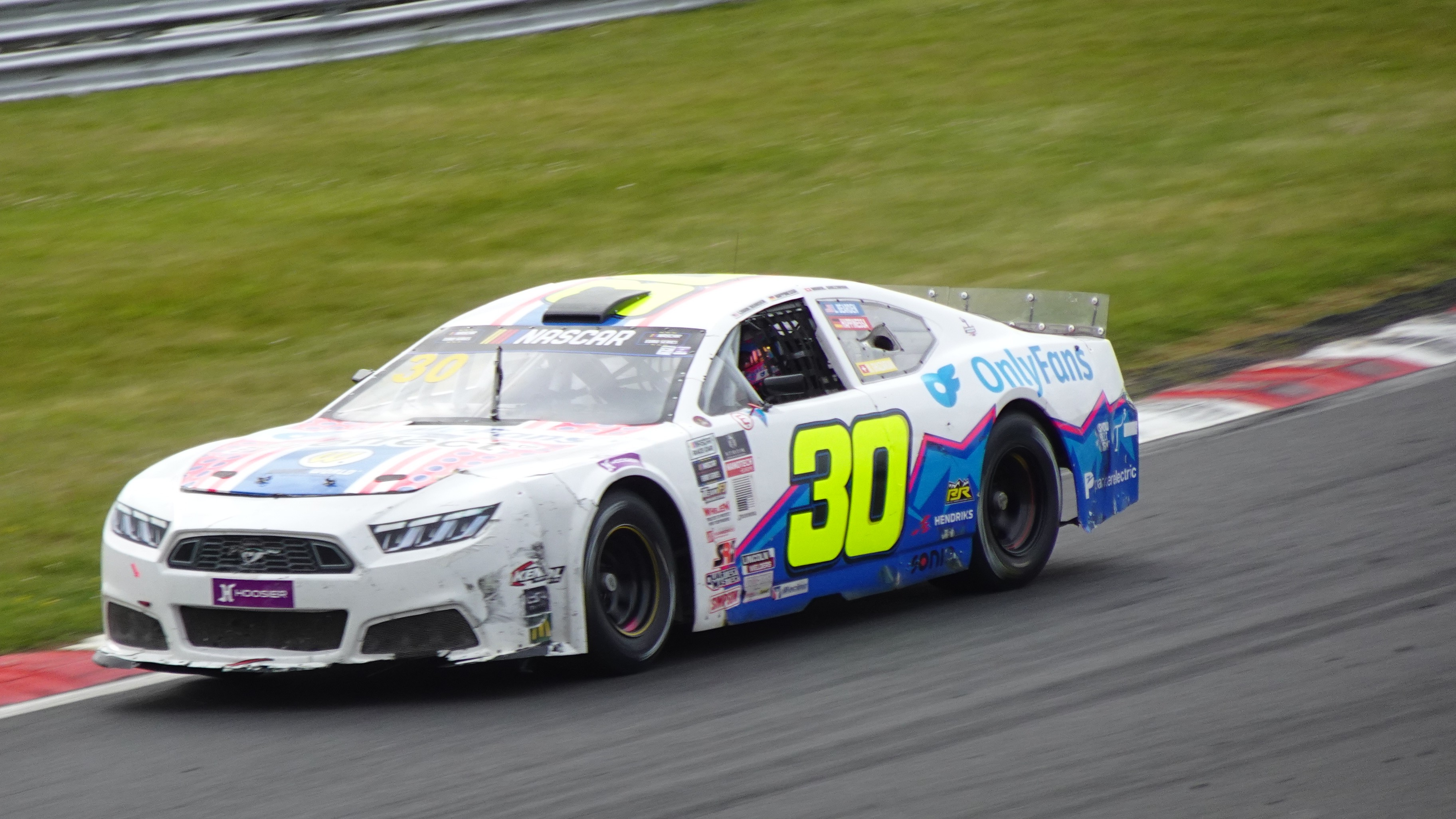
Happinessa racing at Brands Hatch in 2026

Since 2025, Neumann has been competing in the NASCAR Euro Series for the German racing team Bremotion under her pseudonym Happinessa. She drives a 408 hp Chevrolet Camaro. In her debut at the Circuit Ricardo Tormo, she set the fastest lap and finished second in the Lady Trophy. At the Autodromo Vallelunga, she retired after a collision. She achieved her first victory at the Brands Hatch race track.

Neumann lives in Madeira and part-time in Roßdorf.
