= Alberto Naska =

Italian professional racing driver and YouTuber (born 1990)

- Nationality: Italy
- Born: Alberto Fontana; June 14, 1990 (age 36) Turin, Italy

NASCAR Euro Series
- Teams: CAAL Racing
- Car number: 88, 54
- Crew chief: Luca Canneori
- Starts: 24
- Wins: 7
- Poles: 3
- Fastest laps: 4
- Best finish: 2nd in 2022
- Finished last season: 6th in 2023

Previous series
- 2013 2021 2021-22 2022 - 23 2022-23 2023 2024: Abarth Benelux Trophy; Smart EQ Cup; Legend Cars Italia; NASCAR Euro Series; Italian GT Championship; EuroLegend Cup; Formula X Italian Championship

Championship titles
- 2013 2019 2023 2024 2025: Abarth Benelux Trophy; Race Attack 1000; EuroLegend Cup; Lotus Cup Italia; Legend Cars Italia

YouTube information
- Channel: Alberto Naska
- Genre: Racing
- Subscribers: 1.06 million
- Views: 422.0 million
- Last updated: 26 November 2025

Alberto Fontana (born 14 June 1990), known professionally as Alberto Naska, is an Italian social media personality and racing driver who currently competes in the Lotus Cup Italia and Italian Legend Cars Championship.

He has over 1 million subscribers on his YouTube channel, with content related to motorsports and racing.

== Early life and education ==
Alberto Naska was born in Turin, in the Piedmont region, in 1990. In 2012, he graduated at the Polytechnic University of Turin as computer engineer, and moved to Milan the next year where he opened a racing social network and worked as a videomaker.

== Racing career ==
=== In sim racing ===
Naska debuted in 2006 as a virtual racer and won a championship in 2007 year. As a reward, he received the possibility of driving a Formula Renault 2000 Lite on track. In 2012, Naska took part at the Swiss racing reality show Make it Your Race, organized by Abarth and won the Abarth Benelux Trophy in 2013.

=== In real-life motorsport ===
==== 2018: Motorcycle racing debut ====
In 2018, Naska began his amateur motorcycle racing career in the Trofeo Motoestate in the Race Attack 1000 division. He ended his first season in fifth place, claiming three podiums in the process.

The next season, Naska stayed in the championship and after a run of five consecutive wins he claimed the title at the last round in Varano.

In 2020, Naska switched to the Coppa Italia Senior Cup, but an ankle injury following an accident in the first round of Misano cut short his season and ended his motorcycle career.

==== 2021: Full switch to cars racing ====
After the accident that had compromised his motorcycle career, Naska decided to focus exclusively on car racing, where he has competed occasionally since 2018.

Naska competed in the Formula X Italian Series for Harp Racing in 2021, where he showed good pace winning three races, but a series of mechanical troubles during the first part of the season did not allow him to finish higher than second.

In 2021, Naska also raced in the Legend Cars Italia series where he ended up second in the standings despite eight race wins and in the Smart EQ Cup where a difficult adaptation to the car and the electric power did not allow him to express at his best, finishing 19th.

==== 2022 and 2023: NASCAR Whelen Euro Series ====
In 2022, Naska announced he would race in the NASCAR Whelen Euro Series with the CAAL Racing's number 88 car for that season in the Euronascar 2 division. Naska finished his debut season with five wins and a second place overall both in the rookie and general standings.

For the 2023 NASCAR Whelen Euro Series season, Naska switched to the number 54, still with CAAL Racing. He raced in the Mitjet Italian Series, sharing car number 54 from GRT Motorsport with Ian Rocca. He also raced in the EuroLegend Cup, also with car number 54, with the Heroes Valley team. At the first round at Circuit Valencia, he finished second in both Euro Series races behind Vladimiros Tziorzis. At the second round at Brands Hatch, he finished second in Race 1 behind Vladimiros Tziortzis and third in Race 2 behind Vladimiros Tziortzis and Paul Jouffreau. At the third round at Autodromo Vallelunga, he won Race 1 in front of Paul Jouffreau and Gil Linster. Naska finished second in Race 2 behind Jouffreau. At the fourth round at Autodrom Most, he ended up 14th in Race 1 and 1st in Race 2. At the fifth round at Motorsport Arena Oschersleben, he took second position in Race 1 and 15th in Race 2, making him second in the championship three points behind Tziortzis. After two unsuccessful races at Circuit Zolder he ended the season in sixth, 57 points away from the lead, while his EuroNascar Pro teammate Gianmarco Ercoli won the championship with the number 54 car. He ended up 15th in Mitjet Italian Series championship, sharing car number 54 from GRT Motorsport with Ian Rocca (who ended up 31st). Naska also won the 2023 EuroLegend Cup championship.

==== 2024: Back to racing in Italy ====
In 2024, Naska raced in Formula X Italian Series's Championships, FX Pro, Lotus Cup Italy, and in Mitjet Italian Series. At the first two races at Mugello, he won Race 2 in Lotus Cup Italy, after concluding Race 1 in second position. In FX Pro, he concluded Race 1 in fifth position, after having taken pole position. He took second place in Race 2 because of grid inversion of the top-six. He concluded a sort-of-rainy Race 2 in second position, losing the race at the last lap. After the disqualification of Patrik Fraboni, who concluded the race in first place at the beginning and whose car was found to not conform to technical regulations, Naska inherited the win in Race 2. At the second round, at Autodromo Riccardo Paletti, in Varano de Melegari, he ended Race 1 of FX Pro category with a win, and ended Race 2 in second place. In Lotus Cup Italy championship he won both races. At the third round at Circuito di Magione, he ended Race 1 of FX Pro category with a win, while he did not finish Race 2. In Lotus Cup Italy he ended Race 1 in second and Race 2 in third. At the fourth round at Misano World Circuit, he ended Race 1 of FX Pro in sixth position, while Race 2 in second position. In Lotus Cup Italy, he ended both races in second position. At the fifth round at Autodromo "Piero Taruffi" in Vallelunga, he concluded Race 1 of FX Pro with a second place, while Race 2 with a win. In Lotus Cup Italy, he concluded Race 1 with a win, while Race 2 in second (this round had a 1.5 coefficient). At the sixth round at Mugello Circuit, he concluded Race 1 of FX Pro in seventh position, later promoted to sixth, due to a penalty to his close friend and fellow competitor Andrea Gilardoni. He then concluded Race 2 in third position, being promoted to second, due to a penalty to his closest rival in the championship, 15 year old Patrik Fraboni. He concluded both Lotus Cup Italy races in third place. At the seventh round at Misano World Circuit, he concluded Race 1 of FX Pro in third position and Race 2 in thirteenth position, after a 25-second penalty due to a contact with his rival in the championship, Patrik Fraboni. He concluded this championship in third position, behind Francesco Pio Coppola, as well. In Lotus Cup Italy, he won the championship straight after Superpole Qualifying, then concluding both Race 1 and Race 2 in second position.

In Mitjet Italian Series, Naska's rivals include amongst others his friend Ian Rocca and EuroLegend Cup contender Davide Gaggianesi. At the first round at Circuit Paul Ricard, he ended Race 1 and 2 in third, Race 3 in second and Race 4 in sixth. At the second round at Autodromo Vallelunga he ended Race 1 in first, Race 2 in second, Race 3 in third and Race 4 in second. At the third round at Autodromo di Pergusa, he ended both Race 1 and 2 in fourth position, Race 3 in seventh position and Race 4 in fifth position. At the fourth round at Mugello Circuit, he ended Race 1 in eleventh position, Race 2 in fifth position, Race 3 in eighth position and Race 4 in seventh position. At the fifth round at Misano World Circuit, he ended Race 1 in third position, Race 2 in seventh position, Race 3 in sixth position and Race 4 in fourth position. He concluded this championship in third position.

==== 2025: GT4 European Series ====
In 2025, Naska announced he would race in the GT4 European Series, partnering with Stefano D'Aste and in the Lotus Cup Italy, later adding Legend Cars Italia, as well.

At the first round of GT4 European Series at Circuit Paul Ricard, France, they concluded Race 1 in 21st position overall, sixth position PRO-Am category, while they concluded Race 2 with a DNF due to a contact with another car. At the second round at Circuit Zandvoort, Netherlands, they concluded Race 1 in 18th position overall, third position PRO-Am category, while they concluded Race 2 in 11th position overall, second position PRO-Am category. At the third round at Circuit de Spa-Francorchamps, Belgium, they concluded Race 1 with a DNF, while they concluded Race 2 in 9th position overall, first position PRO-Am category. At the fourth round at Misano World Circuit, Italy, they concluded Race 1 with a DNF, while they concluded Race 2 in 29th position overall, tenth position PRO-Am category. At the fifth round at Nurburgring GP-Strecke, Germany, they concluded Race 1 in 26th position overall, tenth position PRO-Am category, while they did not conclude Race 2, although being classified in 35th position, 12th position PRO-Am category. At the sixth and last round at Circuit de Barcelona-Catalunya, Spain, they concluded Race 1 in 17th position overall, seventh position PRO-Am category, while they concluded Race 2 in 25th position overall, 9th position PRO-Am category. They concluded this championship in seventh position PRO-Am category, with a 108-point disadvantage to first place PRO-Am category, which is Aston Martin crew composed by the Russian duo Stanislav Safronov-Aleksandr Vaintrub and a 12-point disadvantage to sixth place PRO-Am category, which is Ginetta crew composed by French drivers Thibaut and Hugo Mogica.

In Lotus Cup Italy, at the first round at Mugello Circuit, Naska won both Race 1 and Race 2. At the second round at Autodromo dell'Umbria, in Magione, Naska concluded Race 1 in second position and Race 2 in 4th position. At the third round at Autodromo Riccardo Paletti, in Varano de' Melegari, Naska won Race 1 and concluded sixth in Race 2. At the fourth round at Autodromo Nazionale Monza, Naska won Race 1 and DNFed Race 2 due to a broken gearbox. At the fifth round at Autodromo di Vallelunga, Naska DNFed Race 1 due to a broken driveshaft, while he concluded Race 2 in fourth position. At the sixth and penultimate round at Misano World Circuit, Naska concluded Race 1 in second position and Race 2 in fourth position. At the seventh and last round at Misano World Circuit, Naska concluded both Race 1 and Race 2 in third position, with Race 1 being affected by a broken silent block, making his car lose stability in turning. He concluded this championship in second place, with a 55-point disadvantage to championship winner Massimo Abbati.

In Legend Cars Italia, at the first round at Mugello Circuit, Naska won Race 1, concluded second in Race 2 and won Race 3 but was then penalised down to seventh for a Safety Car infringement. At the second round at Autodromo dell'Umbria, in Magione, Naska DNFed Race 1 and won both Race 2 and Race 3. At the third round at Autodromo Riccardo Paletti, in Varano de' Melegari, Naska won all three races. At the fourth round at Autodromo Nazionale Monza, Naska DNFed Race 1, although being classified in 31st position, due to an issue with a relay. He concluded Race 2 in third position and won Race 3. At the fifth and penultimate round at Autodromo di Vallelunga, Naska concluded Race 1 in fifth position, Race 2 in second position and won Race 3. At the sixth and last round at Misano World Circuit, being the final races all double-points, Naska won Race 1 and concluded Race 2 and 3 in sec ond position. He won this championship with only an eight-point advantage to second place sitter, Alessandro Bollini.

== Personal life ==
In 2016, Naska opened his YouTube channel, which through the years has reached over 1 million subscribers. On his channel, he makes videos about his racing career and other experiences outside motorsport. In 2020, Naska published his autobiographical book Fino all'ultima curva.

Naska is currently married with Sthefanny Vasquez, who he met in 2020 and married after two years on July 18, 2022, and has a daughter.

== Racing record ==
=== Racing career summary ===
Season	Series	Team	Races	Wins	Poles	F/Laps	Podiums	Points	Position
2018	FormulaX Italian Series - Trofeo Predator's PC015	SRZ	6	0	1	0	7	0	NC†
2019	FormulaX Italian Series - Trofeo Predator's PC015	SRZ	6	0	0	0	1	0	NC
2019	FormulaX Italian Series - Trofeo Predator's PC015	Harp Racing	4	0	0	0	0	0	NC
2019	24h di Adria - Ibiza Cup	Team AdriaRaceway	1	0	0	0	1	-	**3rd**
2019	TCR DSG Endurance	Scuderia del Girasole	1	0	0	0	0	0	NC†
2020	FormulaX Italian Series - Trofeo Predator's PC015	Harp Racing	-	-	-	-	-	-	-
2021	FormulaX Italian Series - Trofeo Predator's FX3	Harp Racing	14	3	2	0	8	-	**2nd**
2021	Italian Legend Cars Championship	Heroes Valley	16	8	8	2	9	-	**2nd**
2021	Smart EQ Cup	Merbag Milano	8	0	2	0	1	-	19th
2022	NASCAR Whelen Euro Series - EuroNASCAR 2	CAAL Racing	12	5	2	3	9	444	**2nd**
2022	Italian Legend Cars Championship	Heroes Valley	11	3	-	-	7	-	**2nd**
2022	BMW M2 CS Racing Italia		2	0	0	0	0	14	
2022	Italian GT Endurance Championship - GT4	Nova Race	1	1	1	1	1	20	**1st**
2023	NASCAR Whelen Euro Series - EuroNASCAR 2	CAAL Racing	12	2	3	1	6	371	6th
2023	Mitjet Italian Series	GRT Motorsport	10	0	1	0	1	99	15th
2023	EuroLegend Cup	Heroes Valley	14	3	1	2	8	534	**1st**
2023	Italian GT Endurance Championship - GT3	Nova Race	1	0	0	0	0	2	9th
2023	FormulaX Italian Series - GT4 Italy	Autorlando Italia	2	1	2	0	2	0	NC
2024	FormulaX Italian Series - Formula 4	Harp Racing	14	4	1	-	5	230	**3rd**
2024	Lotus Cup Italia	PB Racing	14	4	2	-	10	348.5	**1st**
2024	Mitjet Italian Series	GRT Motorsport	20	1	1	0	7	290.5	**3rd**
2024	US Legend Cars Semi-Pro World Finals	Legend Stock Car	1	0	0	-	0	-	5th
2025	GT4 European Series - Pro-Am	Lotus PB Racing	12	1	0	0	2	81	7th
2025	Lotus Cup Italia	Lotus PB Racing	12	4	0	0	9	263	**2nd**
2025	24H Series - GT4	Lotus PB Racing	1	0	1	-	1	32	NC†
2025	Italian Legend Cars Championship	ACME Speedworks	15	8	3	0	11	1086	**1st**
2026	Lotus Cup Italia	PB Racing	4	1	0	0	4	100.5*	2nd*
2026	Italian Legend Cars Championship	ACME Speedworks	3	2	1	2	2	172*	1st*

^{†} As Naska was a guest driver, he was ineligible to score points.

* Season still in progress.

=== Complete Formula X Italian Series Results ===
(key) (Races in bold indicate pole position) (Races in italics indicate fastest lap)

Year	Team	No.	Make	1	2	3	4	5	6	7	8	9	10	11	12	13	14	DC	Pts
2018	SRZ	54	Predator PC015	CRE; 5	CRE; 2													NC†	0
2018	SRZ	54	Predator PC010			CER; 2	CER; 3	**VAR**; 2	VAR; 3									NC†	0
2019	SRZ	54	Predator PC015	CRE; 5	CRE; 4	VAR; DNS	VAR; 5											??	??
2019	Harp Racing	54	Predator PC015					VAR; 6	VAR; Ret	VAR; 3	VAR; C	ADR	ADR					??	??
2021	Harp Racing	54	Predator FX3 PC015	VAR; 5	VAR; 4	MOD; 4	MOD; Ret	VAL; 5	VAL; 4	MIS; 1	**MIS**; 3	VAR; 2	VAR; 2	VAL; 1	**VAL**; 2	CER; 2	CER; 1	2nd	??
2024	Harp Racing	54	FX Pro - Tatuus T014	**MUG**; 5	MUG; 1	VAR; 1	VAR; 2	MAG; 1	MAG; Ret	MIS; 6	MIS; 2	VAL; 2	VAL; 1	MUG; 6	MUG; 2	MIS; 3	MIS; 13	3rd	230

=== Complete Italian Legend Cars Championship Results ===
(key) (Races in bold indicate pole position) (Races in italics indicate fastest lap)

Year	Team	No.	Make	1	2	3	4	5	6	7	8	9	10	11	12	13	14	15	16	17	18	DC	Pts
2021	Heroes Valley	54	Legend Stock Car	CAS; 1; 4	CAS; 2; 2	VAR; 1; 7	VAR; 2; 5	**MOD**; 1; 1	**MOD**; 2; 1	**MOD2**; 1; 1	**MOD2**; 2; 1	CAS2; 1; 10	CAS2; 2; 9	**VAR2**; 1; 1	**VAR2**; 2; 1	CAS3; 1; 5	CAS3; 2; 4	CER; 1; 1	**CER**; 2; 1			2nd	??
2022	Heroes Valley	54	Legend Stock Car	VAR; 1; 1	VAR; 2; 3	MAG; 1; 1	MAG; 2; 2	MOD; 1; 4	MOD; 2; 3	VAL; 1; 3	VAL; 2; 1	CAS; 1; 10	CAS; 2 Ret	VAR2; 1; 7	VAR2; 1; 5	CER; 1 TA	CER; 2 TA	MON	MON	MUG	MUG	2nd	??
2025	ACME Speedworks	54	Legend Stock Car	MUG; 1; 1	MUG; 2; 2	MUG; 3; 7	MAG; 1 Ret	MAG; 2; 1	MAG; 3; 1	VAR; 1; 1	VAR; 2; 1	VAR; 3; 1	MON; 1 Ret	MON; 2; 3	MON; 3; 1	VAL; 1; 5	VAL; 2; 2	VAL; 3; 1	MIS; 1; 1	MIS; 2; 2	MIS; 3; 2	1st	1086
2026	ACME Speedworks	54	Legend Stock Car	VAL; 1; 1	VAL; 2; 1	VAL; 3; 4	VAR; 1; 17	VAR; 2; 1	VAR; 3 Ret	MAG; 1; 4	MAG; 2; 2	MAG; 3; 2	VAL2; 1 Ret	VAL2; 2	VAL2; 3	MUG; 1	MUG; 2	MUG; 3	MIS; 1	MIS; 2	MIS; 3	2nd*	374*

=== Complete EuroLegend Cup Results ===
(key) (Races in bold indicate pole position) (Races in italics indicate fastest lap)

Year	Team	No.	Make	1	2	3	4	5	6	7	8	9	10	11	12	13	14	Pos	Pt
2023	Heroes Valley	54	Legend Stock Car	ESP; 1	ESP; 1	ESP; 1	ITA; 6	ITA; 8	ITA; 3	CZE; 1	CZE; 2	CZE; 5	MIS; Ret	MIS; 2	MIS; 4	MIS; 4	MIS; 3	1st	534

=== Complete NASCAR Whelen Euro Series results ===
(key) (Races in bold indicate pole position) (Races in italics indicate fastest lap)

Year	Team	No.	Make	1	2	3	4	5	6	7	8	9	10	11	12	Pos	Pt
2022	CAAL Racing	88	Chevrolet Camaro	ESP; 2	ESP; 2	GBR; 1	GBR; 2	**ITA**; 1	ITA; 5	CZE; 1	**CZE**; 1	BEL; 24	BEL; 5	CRO; 2	CRO; 3	2nd	444
2023	CAAL Racing	54	Chevrolet Camaro	ESP; 2	ESP; 2	GBR; 2	GBR; 3	ITA; 1	ITA; 2	CZE; 14	CZE; 1	GER; 2	GER; 15	BEL; 18	BEL; 19	6th	371

=== Complete Mitjet Italian Series results ===
(key) (Races in bold indicate pole position) (Races in italics indicate fastest lap)

Year	Team	No.	Make	1	2	3	4	5	6	7	8	9	10	11	12	13	14	15	16	17	18	19	20	Pos	Pt
2023	GRT Motorsport	54	Mitjet	VAL; 1; 10	VAL; 2 Ret	MUG; 1 DNS	MUG; 2 DNS	MON; 1 Ret	MON; 2; 10	MIS; 1 DNS	**MIS**; **2** DNS	HOC; 1; 5	HOC; 2; 2											15th	99
2024	GRT Motorsport	54	Mitjet	PRC; 1; 3	PRC; 2; 3	PRC; 3; 2	PRC; 4; 6	**VAL**; 1; 1	VAL; 2; 2	VAL; 3; 3	VAL; 4; 2	PER; 1; 4	PER; 2; 4	PER; 3; 7	PER; 4; 5	MUG; 1; 11	MUG; 1; 5	MUG; 1; 8	MUG; 1; 7	MIS; 1; 3	MIS; 2; 7	MIS; 3; 6	MIS; 4; 4	3rd	290.5

=== Complete Lotus Cup Italia results ===
(key) (Races in bold indicate pole position) (Races in italics indicate fastest lap)

Year	Team	No.	Make	1	2	3	4	5	6	7	8	9	10	11	12	13	14	Pos	Pt
2024	PB Racing	54	Lotus Elise	MUG; 1; 2	MUG; 2; 1	**VAR**; 1; 1	VAR; 2; 1	**MAG**; 1; 2	MAG; 2; 3	MIS; 1; 2	MIS; 2; 2	VAL; 1; 1	VAL; 2; 2	MUG2; 1; 3	MUG2; 2; 3	MIS2; 1; 2	MIS2; 2; 2	1st	348.5
2025	PB Racing	54	Lotus Elise	MUG; 1; 1	MUG; 2; 1	MAG; 1; 2	MAG; 2; 2	VAR; 1; 1	VAR; 2; 6	MON; 1; 1	MON; 2 Ret	VAL; 1; 12	VAL; 2; 4	MIS; 1; 2	MIS; 2; 4	MIS2; 1; 3	MIS2; 2; 3	2nd	299
2026	PB Racing	54	Lotus Elise	VAL; 1; 2	VAL; 2; 1	VAR; 1; 3	VAR; 2; 2	MAG; 1; 3	MAG; 2; 7	LEC; 1; 1	LEC; 2; 3	MON; 1	MON; 2	MIS; 1	MIS; 2			2nd*	181*

=== Complete GT4 European Series results ===
(key) (Races in bold indicate pole position) (Races in italics indicate fastest lap)

Year	Team	Car	No.	Class	1	2	3	4	5	6	7	8	9	10	11	12	Pos	Points
2025	PB Racing	Lotus Emira GT4	54	Pro-Am	LEC; 1; 21	LEC; 2 Ret	ZAN; 1; 18	ZAN; 2; 11	SPA; 1 Ret	SPA; 2; 9	MIS; 1 Ret	MIS; 2; 29	NÜR; 1; 26	NÜR; 2; 35	CAT; 1; 17	CAT; 2; 25	7th	81

== Motorcycle record ==
=== Motorcycle career summary ===
Season	Series	Team	Races	Wins	Poles	F/Laps	Podiums	Points	Position
2018	MotoEstate - Race Attack 1000	TecnicaMoto	10	0	2	1	3	143	5th
2019	MotoEstate - Race Attack 1000	TecnicaMoto	10	5	2	0	7	174	**1st**
2020	Coppa Italia - Superior Cup	TecnicaMoto	1	0	0	0	0	0	NC

=== Complete Race Attack 1000 results ===
(key) (Races in bold indicate pole position) (Races in italics indicate fastest lap)

Race Attack 1000 Italian Championship- Results
Year	Team	No.	Make	1	2	3	4	5	6	7	8	9	10	Pos	Pt
2018	TecnicaMoto	54	Yamaha R1	**FRA**; **1**; 3	**FRA**; **2**; 3	VAR; 1; 12	VAR; 2; 4	CER; 1; 5	CER; 2 C	FRA2; 1; 2	FRA2; 2 Ret	VAR2; 1; 5	VAR2; 2; 5	5th	143
2019	TecnicaMoto	54	Yamaha R1	FRA; 1; 2	FRA; 2 C	VAR; 1 Ret	VAR; 2; 3	**CER**; **1**; 4	**CER**; **2**; 1	FRA2; 1; 1	FRA2; 2; 1	VAR2; 1; 1	VAR2; 2; 1	1st	174

=== Complete Coppa Italia - Superior Cup results ===
(key) (Races in bold indicate pole position) (Races in italics indicate fastest lap)

Year	Team	No.	Make	1	2	3	4	5	6	Pos	Pt
2020	TecnicaMoto	54	Yamaha R1	MIS; 1 Ret	MIS; 2 DNS	MUG; 1	MUG; 2	MUG2; 1	MUG2; 1	NC	0
