= 2022 NASCAR Whelen Euro Series =

European auto racing season

Locations of the circuits that hosted a NASCAR Whelen Euro Series race in 2022

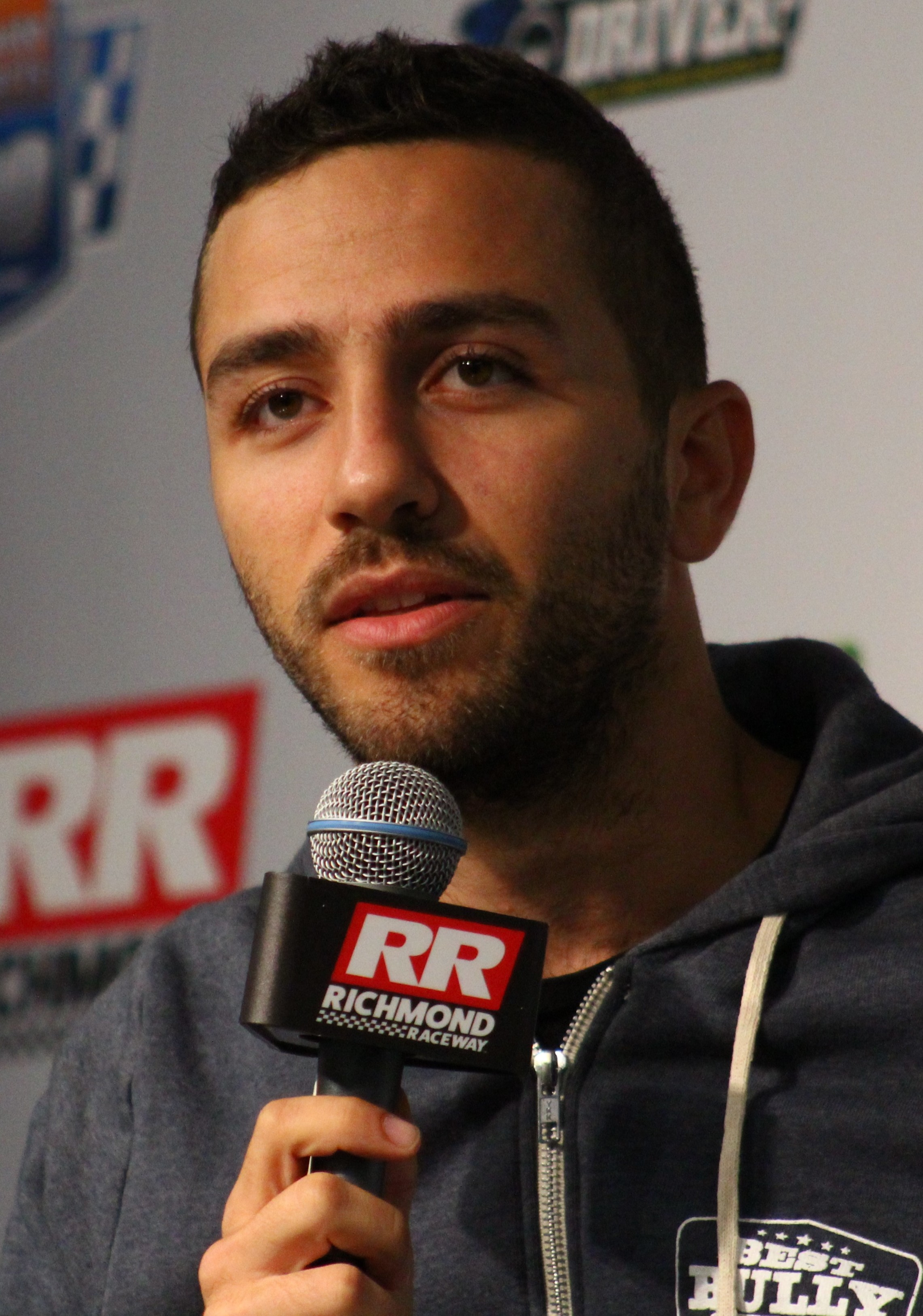
Alon Day won his record breaking fourth NASCAR Whelen Euro Series title in 2022.

The 2022 NASCAR Whelen Euro Series was the fourteenth Racecar Euro Series season, and the tenth under the NASCAR Whelen Euro Series branding. The season began on 14 May with the NASCAR GP Spain at Circuit Ricardo Tormo and ended on 30 October with the EuroNASCAR Finals at Automotodrom Grobnik.

Alon Day became the first driver to be crowned champion for four times after he clinched the title in the final round at Rijeka. Day scored five race wins, the most of any driver in the EuroNASCAR PRO class. Swedish driver Alexander Graff finished second after scoring his maiden victory at Brands Hatch while Gianmarco Ercoli finished third after scoring three victories. Nicolò Rocca, Sebastiaan Bleekemolen and Patrick Lemarié scored a victory each at Valencia, Most, and Rijeka respectively with Lemarié's victory making him the oldest race winner in the EuroNASCAR PRO class at the age of 54 years old.

Defending series champion Loris Hezemans did not defend his title as he moved to the NASCAR Cup Series to compete part-time with Team Hezeberg, but his younger brother Liam Hezemans was crowned as the EuroNASCAR 2 champion on his debut season after scoring six race victories and nine podium finishes. Italian driver Alberto Fontana, better known as the YouTube content creator Alberto Naska, finished 9 points behind Liam in second place after scoring five victories and nine podium finishes on his debut season in stock car racing. Cypriot driver Vladimiros Tziortzis finished third in the standings and is the only other race winner of the season, having won the season opening race at Valencia.

Hendriks Motorsport won the Team's Championship for four years in a row after the team's No. 50 car finished on top with 836 points while Hendriks' second team, the No. 7 car, finished second with 779 points. Finishing 10 points behind Hendriks' No. 7 car is PK Carsport's No. 24 team and Team Bleekemolen's No. 69 team, who finished the year with 769 points on their respective tallies. PK Carsport won the tiebreaker for third by virtue of better finishing results, having scored five victories compared to Team Bleekemolen's one.

== Teams and drivers ==
NASCAR Whelen Euro Series released a provisional 37-car entry list for the teams participating on 25 March 2022.

=== EuroNASCAR PRO ===
Team	No.	Body Style	Race Driver	Rounds
(Italy) Academy Motorsport	1	Ford Mustang	(Greece) Thomas Krasonis	1–4
(Italy) Academy Motorsport	2	EuroNASCAR FJ 2020 1 Ford Mustang 5	(Italy) Federico Monti	All
(Italy) Academy Motorsport	5	EuroNASCAR FJ 2020	(France) Patrick Lemarié	All
(France) RDV Competition	3	Chevrolet Camaro	(France) Frédéric Gabillon	All
(France) Panasport	4	Chevrolet Camaro	(France) Yannick Panagiotis	1
(Netherlands) Hendriks Motorsport-MOMO	7	Ford Mustang	(Czech Republic) Martin Doubek	All
(Netherlands) Hendriks Motorsport-MOMO	50	Ford Mustang 3 Toyota Camry 3	(Germany) Tobias Dauenhauer	1
(Netherlands) Hendriks Motorsport-MOMO	50	Ford Mustang 3 Toyota Camry 3	(Netherlands) Liam Hezemans	2–6
(Italy) Racers Motorsport	8	Chevrolet Camaro	(Italy) Dario Caso	1–4, 6 (Note: Dario Caso was originally entered in the No. 8 car for Vallelunga, but switched to the No. 9 car for the Sunday EuroNASCAR PRO race.)
(Italy) Racers Motorsport	9	Chevrolet Camaro	(Italy) Dario Caso	3
(Italy) Racers Motorsport	47	Chevrolet Camaro	(Italy) Leonardo Colavita	1–2
(Belgium) PK Carsport	11	Chevrolet Camaro	(Belgium) Pol van Pollaert	5
(Belgium) PK Carsport	24	Chevrolet Camaro	(Israel) Alon Day	1–4, 6
(Belgium) PK Carsport	24	Chevrolet Camaro	(Belgium) Anthony Kumpen	5
(France) SpeedHouse	14	Chevrolet Camaro 3 Ford Mustang 3	(Belgium) Marc Goossens	All
(France) SpeedHouse	33	Ford Mustang	(Italy) Cosimo Barberini	All
(France) SpeedHouse	40	Ford Mustang	(Norway) Eyvind Brynildsen	2
(France) SpeedHouse	40	Ford Mustang	(United Kingdom) Alex Sedgwick	3
(France) SpeedHouse	40	Ford Mustang	(Israel) Alon Day	5
(France) SpeedHouse	64	Chevrolet Camaro 3 Ford Mustang 3	(Sweden) Alexander Graff	All
(Italy) MK1 Racing Italia (Note: This is the team name entered in the championship. The team is listed as MK1 Racing – RaceArt Technology in the Entry List.)	16	Shadow DNM8 1 Ford Mustang 5	(Italy) Claudio Remigio Cappelli	All
(Italy) MK1 Racing Italia	17	Shadow DNM8	(Italy) Bernardo Manfrè	1–2
(Switzerland) Race Art Technology	18	Toyota Camry	(Switzerland) Giorgio Maggi	All
(Netherlands) Team Bleekemolen	23	Ford Mustang	(Finland) Henri Tuomaala	All
(Netherlands) Team Bleekemolen	44	Ford Mustang	(Finland) Jonne Rautjärvi	All (Note: Jonne Rautjärvi was originally entered in the No. 44 car for Vallelunga, but a crash involving teammate Janne Koikkalainen in the EuroNASCAR 2 Qualifying damaged the No. 44 beyond repair for the rest of the round. Rautjärvi was subsequently transferred to the No. 72 car for the Sunday EuroNASCAR PRO race.)
(Netherlands) Team Bleekemolen	69	Ford Mustang	(Netherlands) Sebastiaan Bleekemolen	All
(Netherlands) Team Bleekemolen	72	Chevrolet Camaro	(Finland) Ian Eric Wadén	1–2
(Netherlands) Team Bleekemolen	72	Chevrolet Camaro	(Finland) Jonne Rautjärvi	3
(Netherlands) Team Bleekemolen	72	Chevrolet Camaro	(France) Thomas Dombrowski	5
(Italy) Not Only Motorsport	25	Chevrolet Camaro	(Italy) Paolo Maria Silvestrini	1
(Italy) Not Only Motorsport	25	Chevrolet Camaro	(Italy) Nicolò Gabossi	3–4 (Note: Nicolò Gabossi was originally entered in the No. 25 car for Vallelunga while Vittorio Ghirelli was entered in the No. 89 car. However, a crash involving Alberto Panebianco in the Saturday EuroNASCAR 2 race meant that the No. 89 car was damaged beyond repair for the rest of the week. Gabossi's entry was subsequently withdrawn while Ghirelli was transferred to the No. 25 car for the Sunday EuroNASCAR PRO race.)
(Italy) Not Only Motorsport	25	Chevrolet Camaro	(Italy) Vittorio Ghirelli	3
(Italy) Not Only Motorsport	36	Ford Mustang	(Italy) Vittorio Ghirelli	1–2, 4–6
(Italy) Not Only Motorsport	89	Chevrolet Camaro	(Italy) Davide Dallara	1–2, 4
(Italy) Not Only Motorsport	89	Chevrolet Camaro	(Italy) Vittorio Ghirelli	3
(Italy) Not Only Motorsport	90	Chevrolet Camaro	(Italy) Nicolò Gabossi	1–2
(Italy) Not Only Motorsport	90	Chevrolet Camaro	(Italy) Davide Dallara	3
(Italy) Double V Racing	27	Ford Mustang	(Italy) Stefano Attianese	3
(United Arab Emirates) Buggyra ZM Racing (Note: This is the team name entered in the championship. The team entered as Buggyra ZM – MFT Racing for Brands Hatch.)	29	Ford Mustang	(United Arab Emirates) Aliyyah Koloc	1–4
(United Arab Emirates) Buggyra ZM Racing	38	Ford Mustang	(Lithuania) Gustas Grinbergas	1
(Germany) Marko Stipp Motorsport	46	Chevrolet Camaro	(France) Romain Iannetta	All
(Germany) Marko Stipp Motorsport	48	Chevrolet Camaro	(Ukraine) Yevgen Sokolovskiy	1–5
(Germany) Marko Stipp Motorsport	48	Chevrolet Camaro	(Germany) Mike David Ortmann	6
(Italy) Double T by MK1 Racing	47	Chevrolet Camaro	(France) Thomas Ferrando	3
(Italy) Double T by MK1 Racing	47	Chevrolet Camaro	(Italy) Leonardo Colavita	4–6
(Italy) The Club Motorsport	55	Chevrolet Camaro	(Italy) Fabrizio Armetta	All
(Italy) The Club Motorsport	65	Chevrolet Camaro	(Italy) Riccardo Romagnoli	All
(Italy) CAAL Racing	54	Chevrolet Camaro	(Italy) Gianmarco Ercoli	All
(Italy) CAAL Racing	56	Chevrolet Camaro	(Italy) Nicolò Rocca	All
(Italy) CAAL Racing	88	Chevrolet Camaro	(Italy) Max Lanza	All
(Switzerland) Racingfuel Motorsport	58	Chevrolet Camaro	(Germany) Lucas Luhr	1
(Switzerland) Racingfuel Motorsport	58	Chevrolet Camaro	(Switzerland) Christoph Lenz	2–3, 5–6
(Switzerland) Racingfuel Motorsport	94	Chevrolet Camaro	(Switzerland) Bruno Staub	1
(Switzerland) Racingfuel Motorsport	94	Chevrolet Camaro	(Austria) Constantin Kletzer	2
(Switzerland) Racingfuel Motorsport	94	Chevrolet Camaro	(Switzerland) Yann Zimmer	4
(Switzerland) Racingfuel Motorsport	94	Chevrolet Camaro	(Switzerland) Remo Lips	5
Team Japan NEEDS24	74	Toyota Camry	(Japan) Kenko Miura	5

=== EuroNASCAR 2 ===
Team	No.	Body Style	Race Driver	Rounds
(Italy) Academy Motorsport	1	Ford Mustang	(Italy) Andrea Tronconi	1
(Italy) Academy Motorsport	1	Ford Mustang	(Lithuania) Kasparas Vingilis	2–4
(Italy) Academy Motorsport	2	EuroNASCAR FJ 2020 1 Ford Mustang 3	(Lithuania) Kasparas Vingilis	1, 5–6
(Italy) Academy Motorsport	2	EuroNASCAR FJ 2020 1 Ford Mustang 3	(Italy) Arianna Casoli	2 (Note: Arianna Casoli initially competed with SpeedHouse's No. 14 team at Brands Hatch, but the team was forced to not start the Sunday races due to chassis and suspension damage that can't be repaired during race week. A deal with Academy Motorsport allowed Casoli to drive the No. 2 car for the Sunday EuroNASCAR 2 race.)
(Italy) Academy Motorsport	5	EuroNASCAR FJ 2020	(Cyprus) Vladimiros Tziortzis	All
(France) RDV Competition	3	Chevrolet Camaro	(France) Ulysse Delsaux	All
(France) Panasport	4	Chevrolet Camaro	(France) Yannick Panagiotis	1
(Netherlands) Hendriks Motorsport-MOMO	7	Ford Mustang	(Czech Republic) Martin Doubek	All
(Netherlands) Hendriks Motorsport-MOMO	50	Ford Mustang 3 Toyota Camry 3	(Netherlands) Liam Hezemans	All
(Italy) Racers Motorsport	8	Chevrolet Camaro	(Italy) Paolo Valeri	1–4, 6
(Italy) Racers Motorsport	9	Chevrolet Camaro	(Italy) Dario Caso	3–4, 6
(Italy) Racers Motorsport	47	Chevrolet Camaro	(Italy) Leonardo Colavita	1–2
(Belgium) PK Carsport	11	Chevrolet Camaro	(Slovakia) Christian Malcharek	5
(Belgium) PK Carsport	24	Chevrolet Camaro	(Slovakia) Christian Malcharek	1–4, 6
(France) SpeedHouse	14	Chevrolet Camaro 3 Ford Mustang 3	(Italy) Arianna Casoli	All
(France) SpeedHouse	33	Ford Mustang	(France) Paul Jouffreau	All
(France) SpeedHouse	40	Ford Mustang	(Germany) Matthias Hauer	1–2, 4–5
(France) SpeedHouse	40	Ford Mustang	(France) Néo Lambert	3, 6
(France) SpeedHouse	64	Chevrolet Camaro 3 Ford Mustang 3	(France) Eric Quintal	All
(Italy) MK1 Racing Italia	16	Shadow DNM8 1 Ford Mustang 2	(Italy) Alfredo de Matteo	1
(Italy) MK1 Racing Italia	16	Shadow DNM8 1 Ford Mustang 2	(Italy) Claudio Remigio Cappelli	3, 6
(Italy) MK1 Racing Italia	17	Shadow DNM8	(Italy) Francesco Garisto	1–2
(Switzerland) Race Art Technology	18	Toyota Camry	(Italy) Claudio Remigio Cappelli	2, 4–5
(Switzerland) Race Art Technology	18	Toyota Camry	(Switzerland) Thomas Toffel	6
(Netherlands) Team Bleekemolen	23	Ford Mustang	(Finland) Leevi Lintukanto	1
(Netherlands) Team Bleekemolen	23	Ford Mustang	(Finland) Tuomas Pöntinen	2–6
(Netherlands) Team Bleekemolen	44	Ford Mustang	(Finland) Janne Koikkalainen	1–5
(Netherlands) Team Bleekemolen	69	Ford Mustang	(Netherlands) Melvin de Groot	1–3, 5–6
(Netherlands) Team Bleekemolen	69	Ford Mustang	(Netherlands) Michael Bleekemolen	4
(Netherlands) Team Bleekemolen	72	Chevrolet Camaro	(Netherlands) Michael Bleekemolen	1–3, 5–6
(Italy) Not Only Motorsport	25	Chevrolet Camaro	(Austria) Alina Loibnegger	1 (Note: Roger Mettler was listed in the Entry List and during Friday's Practice sessions as the driver of Racingfuel Motorsport's No. 94 car while Alina Loibnegger was listed as the driver of Not Only Motorsport's No. 25 car. However, Mettler's entry was withdrawn on Saturday and Alina Loibnegger moved from Not Only Motorsport to replace him starting from the qualifying session.)
(Italy) Not Only Motorsport	25	Chevrolet Camaro	(Italy) Paolo Maria Silvestrini	3
(Italy) Not Only Motorsport	36	Chevrolet Camaro	(Serbia) Zoran Kastratović	6
(Italy) Not Only Motorsport	89	Chevrolet Camaro	(Italy) Alberto Panebianco	1–3
(Italy) Not Only Motorsport	90	Chevrolet Camaro	(India) Advait Deodhar	1–3
(Italy) Double V Racing	27	Ford Mustang	(Austria) Patrick Schober	All
(United Arab Emirates) Buggyra ZM Racing	29	Ford Mustang	(United Arab Emirates) Aliyyah Koloc	1–4
(United Arab Emirates) Buggyra ZM Racing	38	Ford Mustang	(United Arab Emirates) Yasmeen Koloc	1 (Note: Yasmeen Koloc was entered for Valencia initially and took part in the Friday practice sessions, but she was replaced by Téo Calvet starting from the Saturday Qualifying session after Buggyra declared her unfit to compete due to the effects of an injury she sustained in the 24H Series race at Circuit de Spa-Francorchamps last month.)
(United Arab Emirates) Buggyra ZM Racing	38	Ford Mustang	(France) Téo Calvet	1
(Germany) Marko Stipp Motorsport	46	Chevrolet Camaro	(Portugal) Miguel Gomes	All
(Germany) Marko Stipp Motorsport	48	Chevrolet Camaro	(Ukraine) Yevgen Sokolovskiy	1–5
(Germany) Marko Stipp Motorsport	48	Chevrolet Camaro	(Germany) Hugo Sasse	6
(Italy) Double T by MK1 Racing	47	Chevrolet Camaro	(Italy) Leonardo Colavita	3–6
(Italy) The Club Motorsport	55	Chevrolet Camaro	(Italy) Roberto Benedetti	3 (Note: Roberto Benedetti was originally entered in the No. 65 car for Vallelunga, but an incident involving teammate Riccardo Romagnoli in the Saturday EuroNASCAR PRO race meant that the No. 65 car was unavailable for Benedetti for the Saturday EuroNASCAR 2 race. The Club would transfer Benedetti to the No. 55 car for the rest of the weekend as a result.)
(Italy) The Club Motorsport	65	Chevrolet Camaro	(Italy) Roberto Benedetti	All
(Italy) CAAL Racing	54	Chevrolet Camaro	(Italy) Luli del Castello	All
(Italy) CAAL Racing	56	Chevrolet Camaro	(Luxembourg) Gil Linster	All
(Italy) CAAL Racing	88	Chevrolet Camaro	(Italy) Alberto "Naska" Fontana	All
(Switzerland) Racingfuel Motorsport	58	Chevrolet Camaro	(Switzerland) Christoph Lenz	1, 5–6
(Switzerland) Racingfuel Motorsport	58	Chevrolet Camaro	(United Kingdom) Matthew Ellis	2–3
(Switzerland) Racingfuel Motorsport	94	Chevrolet Camaro	(Switzerland) Roger Mettler	1
(Switzerland) Racingfuel Motorsport	94	Chevrolet Camaro	(Austria) Alina Loibnegger	All
Team Japan NEEDS24	74	Toyota Camry	(Japan) Kenko Miura	5

=== EuroNASCAR Club Challenge ===
Team	No.	Body Style	Race Driver	Rounds
(Italy) Academy Motorsport	2	EuroNASCAR FJ 2020 1 Ford Mustang 3	(Italy) Federico Monti	1–4
(Italy) Academy Motorsport	5	EuroNASCAR FJ 2020	(Cyprus) Vladimiros Tziortzis	4
(Belgium) PK Carsport	11	Chevrolet Camaro	(Slovakia) Christian Malcharek	4
(Belgium) PK Carsport	24	Chevrolet Camaro	(Belgium) Anthony Kumpen	4
(France) SpeedHouse	14	Chevrolet Camaro 1 Ford Mustang 2	(Italy) Arianna Casoli	2–4
(France) SpeedHouse	33	Ford Mustang	(France) Paul Jouffreau	1–3
(France) SpeedHouse	40	Ford Mustang	(France) Néo Lambert	1–3
(France) SpeedHouse	64	Chevrolet Camaro 2 Ford Mustang 2	(France) Eric Quintal	1–3
(Switzerland) Race Art Technology	18	Toyota Camry	(Switzerland) Giorgio Maggi	4
(Italy) Not Only Motorsport	25	Chevrolet Camaro	(Austria) Julian Vanheelen	1, 3
(Italy) Not Only Motorsport	36	Chevrolet Camaro	(Italy) Vittorio Ghirelli	4
(Italy) Not Only Motorsport	89	Chevrolet Camaro	(Norway) Eyvind Brynildsen	1
(Italy) Double V Racing	27	Ford Mustang	(Austria) Julian Vanheelen	4
(United Arab Emirates) Buggyra ZM Racing	38	Ford Mustang	(Czech Republic) Josef Machacek	1
(Germany) Marko Stipp Motorsport	46	Chevrolet Camaro	(Austria) Andreas Kuchelbacher	1–4
(Germany) Marko Stipp Motorsport	48	Chevrolet Camaro	(United Kingdom) Gordon Barnes	1–4
(Italy) CAAL Racing	54	Chevrolet Camaro	(Italy) Luli del Castello	4
(Italy) CAAL Racing	88	Chevrolet Camaro	(Italy) Alberto "Naska" Fontana	4
(Italy) The Club Motorsport	55	Chevrolet Camaro	(Italy) Fabrizio Armetta	4
(Italy) The Club Motorsport	65	Chevrolet Camaro	(Italy) Roberto Benedetti	4
(Netherlands) Team Bleekemolen	72	Chevrolet Camaro	(France) Thomas Dombrowski	2, 4
(Switzerland) Racingfuel Motorsport	58	Chevrolet Camaro	(Switzerland) Christoph Lenz	1–2
(Switzerland) Racingfuel Motorsport	58	Chevrolet Camaro	(Australia) Maximilian Mason	4
(Switzerland) Racingfuel Motorsport	94	Chevrolet Camaro	(Switzerland) Roger Mettler	1
(Switzerland) Racingfuel Motorsport	94	Chevrolet Camaro	(Switzerland) Mato Matosevic	2
Team Japan NEEDS24	74	Toyota Camry	(Japan) Kenko Miura	4

=== Confirmed changes ===
==== Drivers ====
- Frédéric Gabillon is scheduled to be returning to full-time competition in 2022 after only competing part-time in the 2021 season. Gabillon was due to compete full-time last season, but RDV Competition announced the withdrawal of Gabillon's entry on 20 September 2021 with preparation for the 2022 season being cited as one of the reasons of its withdrawal.
- On 3 November 2021, NASCAR Whelen Euro Series reveals that Loris Hezemans will not defend his title in 2022 as he moves to the United States to race in the NASCAR Cup Series with Team Hezeberg. His 2021 teammate and defending EuroNASCAR 2 champion Martin Doubek will replace Hezemans as the EuroNASCAR PRO driver of Hendriks Motorsport-MOMO's No. 7 car, marking his return as a full-time competitor in EuroNASCAR PRO.
- On 22 November 2021, Leonardo Colavita revealed through an interview with Leadlap that he will be racing full-time in the EuroNASCAR 2 division for 2022. Colavita previously competed part-time in both classes in 2021. Later on 24 February 2022, JTG Daugherty Racing announced that Colavita has received official support from the team and would drive the No. 47 Chevrolet Camaro for Racers Motorsport. The following day, it was announced that Colavita will also compete full-time in the EuroNASCAR PRO division for the 2022 season.
- On 23 November 2021, it was announced that SpeedHouse will promote Paul Jouffreau to the EuroNASCAR 2 division in 2022 after one season in the EuroNASCAR Club Challenge division. Jouffreau, who signed a two-year contract extension with the team, will drive the No. 33 SpeedHouse car in EuroNASCAR 2.
- On 24 November 2021, it was announced that United Arab Emirates-born sisters Aliyyah and Yasmeen Koloc will make their full-time debuts in NASCAR Whelen Euro Series for Buggyra ZM Racing. Aliyyah will be driving the No. 29 Ford Mustang while Yasmeen will drive the No. 38 Ford Mustang, both of whom will compete in both classes. Yasmeen was initially due to run the No. 47, but a number claiming dispute with Racers Motorsport led to Buggyra changing her car number to No. 38 as announced by the team on 8 March 2022.
- On 21 December 2021, CAAL Racing announced that the team have signed Gil Linster for a full-season campaign in EuroNASCAR 2 for 2022. This will mark Linster's third season with CAAL in EuroNASCAR, having previously raced with the team in the 2017 and 2018 seasons.
- On 22 December 2021, Thomas Krasonis announced that he will be receiving a promotion to the EuroNASCAR PRO class in 2022. Krasonis will maintain his seat at Academy Motorsport, although he will be transferred to the team's No. 1 car for the 2022 season.
- On 11 January 2022, Not Only Motorsport announced that Vittorio Ghirelli will be competing with the team full-time in 2022. Ghirelli previously drove for Not Only in the 2021 season's final round at Vallelunga, having previously drove for Hendriks Motorsport for most of the season before making the team switch.
- On 13 January 2022, Leadlap reveals that Solaris Motorsport has parted ways with Alina Loibnegger on mutual agreement due to sponsorship reasons. The announcement came after Loibnegger previously announced during an interview with Leadlap on 14 December 2021 that she will retain her EuroNASCAR 2 seat at Solaris. It's currently unknown on who will replace Loibnegger at Solaris, while NASCAR Whelen Euro Series' official social media accounts would later reveal on 20 February 2022 that Alina Loibnegger will join Not Only Motorsport for the 2022 season. It was subsequently reported through an exclusive interview with Leadlap that was published on 17 March 2022 that Loibnegger will drive the No. 25 Chevrolet Camaro for Not Only Motorsport in 2022.
- On 18 January 2022, CAAL Racing announced that Max Lanza will compete in the EuroNASCAR PRO class for the 2022 season with the team's No. 88 Camaro, replacing Alon Day who is set to make his return to PK Carsport. Lanza is thus scheduled to make his first EuroNASCAR PRO start since the 2019 season, where he competed part-time in the then-called Elite 1 class for The Club Motorsport.
- On 3 February 2022, it was announced that The Club Motorsport's owner-driver Fabrizio Armetta will be contesting the 2022 season full-time with the No. 55 Camaro fielded by his own team. This is scheduled to be Armetta's first full-time campaign in the NASCAR Whelen Euro Series since 2014.
- On 4 February 2022, Hendriks Motorsport announced that Tobias Dauenhauer will receive a promotion to EuroNASCAR PRO after competing for two years in EuroNASCAR 2. Dauenhauer will be joined by Loris Hezemans' younger brother Liam Hezemans, who will be making his series debut as the EuroNASCAR 2 driver of Hendriks' No. 50 Ford.
- On 5 February 2022, Academy Motorsport announced that Patrick Lemarié will be joining the team as one of the team's EuroNASCAR PRO drivers in 2022. Lemarié, who had previously competed with the team at Zolder last year as a replacement driver for Jacques Villeneuve, will be switching teams from DF1 Racing. The same announcement also reveals that team co-owner Federico Monti will be stepping down to compete in EuroNASCAR 2 for the 2022 season after he competed in EuroNASCAR PRO in 2021.
- On 8 February 2022, Finnish newspaper publisher Keskisuomalainen reports that Finnish V8 Thunder Cars driver Jonne Rautjärvi is set to compete in NASCAR Whelen Euro Series with a Dutch-based team in 2022. It is subsequently revealed on 7 March 2022 that Rautjärvi is set to drive for Team Bleekemolen as part of Iceboys' joint partnership with the team, with Rautjärvi being set to make his Euro Series debut as the EuroNASCAR PRO driver of the No. 44 team.
- On 16 February 2022, it was announced that Advait Deodhar will be switching teams to Not Only Motorsport for the 2022 season. Deodhar will drive Not Only's No. 90 Chevrolet as the teammate of Alberto Panebianco, who will be staying in the team's No. 89 Chevrolet for another year.
- On 26 February 2022, it was announced that Giorgio Maggi will be joining Race Art Technology to drive the No. 18 Toyota Camry in the 2022 season.
- On 3 March 2022, Academy Motorsport announced that Andrea Tronconi will be making his series debut in 2022 as the driver of Academy's No. 1 car in EuroNASCAR 2.
- On 4 March 2022, it was announced that Melvin de Groot will be joining Team Bleekemolen for a full-season campaign in EuroNASCAR 2 for 2022. Melvin joined Team Bleekemolen last year as a replacement driver for Michael Bleekemolen in the Croatian and Belgium rounds after Michael was injured in a GT2 accident at Circuit de Spa-Francorchamps. The announcement also revealed that Michael Bleekemolen is set to make his return to the championship as the EuroNASCAR 2 driver of Team Bleekemolen's newly-expanded No. 72 Ford Mustang.
- On 7 March 2022, it was announced that Nicolò Gabossi will be making the step up to EuroNASCAR PRO for the full season with Not Only Motorsport in 2022. Gabossi, who primarily competed in EuroNASCAR Club Challenge in 2021, raced part-time in the EuroNASCAR PRO class as part of the rotation of drivers that competed with Not Only Motorsport's No. 90 team last year.
- On 7 March 2022, it was announced that Henri Tuomaala and Janne Koikkalainen will be joining Team Bleekemolen as part of Iceboys' new partnership agreement with Team Bleekemolen. Tuomaala will continue to compete in EuroNASCAR PRO with the No. 23 Ford Mustang while Koikkalainen is scheduled to make his full-season debut in EuroNASCAR 2 with the No. 44 team.
- On 9 March 2022, Arianna Casoli announced that she will be switching teams to SpeedHouse for the 2022 season. Casoli is set to drive SpeedHouse's newly-expanded No. 14 Ford Mustang in the EuroNASCAR 2 division.
- On 11 March 2022, CAAL Racing announced that Italian motorcycle racer and racing driver Alberto Fontana, better known as the YouTube content creator Alberto Naska, will be joining the series to make his stock car racing debut in EuroNASCAR 2 with CAAL's No. 88 team.
- On 12 March 2022, it was announced that Israeli driver Naveh Talor will be switching teams to DF1 Racing as the new EuroNASCAR 2 driver of the No. 22 team. Talor will be replacing Justin Kunz, whose status is currently unknown. Despite this, Kunz is currently still listed as a driver for DF1 in 2022 according to the team's official website.
- On 14 March 2022, Sud Ouest reports that French driver Thomas Condaminas will be receiving a seat in EuroNASCAR 2 after winning a driver search competition organized by Jacques Villeneuve and Patrick Lemarié's FEED Racing driver academy. Condaminas was scheduled to compete with a team in 2022, but plans ultimately didn't materialized.
- On 16 March 2022, Double V Racing announced on their Facebook page that Austrian driver Patrick Schober will be making his Euro Series debut as the team's EuroNASCAR 2 driver, replacing team co-owner Pierluigi Veronesi whose status as a driver for 2022 is currently unknown.
- The release of official Entry List for the teams participating in the 2022 season revealed the following driver changes for the 2022 season:
  - Ulysse Delsaux is currently left without a ride after RDV closed down the No. 10 team for the 2022 season. It is currently unknown where Delsaux will compete in 2022.
  - Stienes Longin will be leaving the series to continue his participation in the GT2 European Series as part of PK Carsport's expanded effort in the series.
  - Francesco Sini will be leaving the series following Solaris Motorsport's exit from the series.
- On 27 March 2022, SpeedHouse announced that three-time European Abarth Trophy champion and former TCR Europe Touring Car Series driver Cosimo Barberini will be joining the team to make his stock car racing debut in the EuroNASCAR PRO class. SpeedHouse didn't announce which car Barberini is scheduled to drive for in 2022, although German website ThreeWide reports that Barberini is set to drive the No. 33 car in 2022.
- On 2 April 2022, it was announced that Matthias Hauer and Néo Lambert will be set to drive for SpeedHouse with the team's newly-formed No. 40 Ford Mustang team. Both Hauer and Lambert will share the car as part-time competitors in EuroNASCAR 2 as Lambert is also set to compete full-time in the regularity-based EuroNASCAR Club Challenge division.
- On 6 April 2022, it was announced that Riccardo Romagnoli, who competed in the TCR Italy Touring Car Championship last year, will be making his stock car racing debut as a driver of The Club Motorsport. The Club is currently evaluating on which class Romagnoli would compete in 2022.
- On 9 April 2022, it was announced that Christoph Lenz, who has previously competed in various sports car championships such as IMSA SportsCar Championship, GT World Challenge Europe and GT2 European Series, will be making his Euro Series debut as the EuroNASCAR PRO class driver of Racingfuel Motorsport's No. 94 team.
- On 9 April 2022, an article from Czech motoring website České okruhy reported that former two-time European Truck Racing Championship champion David Vršecký is scheduled to make his stock car racing debut in 2022 as a part-time driver of Buggyra ZM Racing. České okruhy reports that Vršecký is set to make his EuroNASCAR debut in the fourth round at Autodrom Most, although the plan ultimately didn't materialized.
- On 25 April 2021, it was announced that Claudio Remigio Cappelli and Alfredo de Matteo, who previously made part-time appearances in 2019 and 2021 respectively, will be competing full-time as the drivers of MK1 Racing Italia's No. 16 Shadow DNM8 in the 2022 season. Cappelli is scheduled to make his debut in the EuroNASCAR PRO class while de Matteo will continue to participate in the EuroNASCAR 2 class.
- On 28 April 2021, it was announced that Luli del Castello will be making her debut in the series as the EuroNASCAR 2 class driver of CAAL Racing's No. 54 team in 2022.
- On 29 April 2021, Marko Stipp Motorsport announced on their official social media account that Romain Iannetta will be extending his contract with the team and compete full-time with the No. 46 team in the EuroNASCAR PRO class for the 2022 season. This is scheduled to be Iannetta's first full-season campaign with the team after he competed part-time in 2021 as well as his first full-time season in EuroNASCAR since 2019.
- On 30 April 2022, ThreeWide revealed that Ian Eric Wadén will be switching rides from the No. 44 team – which he personally owned – to the No. 72 Team Bleekemolen team for the 2022 season, partnering Michael Bleekemolen as the team's EuroNASCAR PRO driver. According to Wadén, the team change was done to accommodate series rookies Jonne Rautjärvi and Janne Koikkalainen's tall posture.
- On 4 May 2022, it was announced that Alexander Graff will be returning to full-time competition in 2022 after he signed a contract to join SpeedHouse as one of the team's EuroNASCAR PRO drivers.
- On 5 May 2022, it was announced that former American Le Mans Series and FIA GT1 World Championship champion, two-time Nürburgring 24 Hours overall winner and two-time 24 Hours of Le Mans class winner Lucas Luhr will make his stock car racing debut after he was signed by Racingfuel Motorsport to compete with the team's No. 58 Chevrolet Camaro in the EuroNASCAR PRO class. The announcement also revealed that Christoph Lenz, who was initially signed to drive the team's No. 94 car in EuroNASCAR PRO, will now compete in EuroNASCAR 2 as Luhr's teammate in the No. 58 car while Swiss driver Roger Mettler will act as his EuroNASCAR 2 class teammate in Racingfuel's No. 94 car.
- On 8 May 2022, AutoMobilSport.com reports that 19-year old Lithuanian driver Kasparas Vingilis has been signed by Academy Motorsport to drive the team's No. 2 EuroNASCAR FJ 2020 for the season opening round at Valencia.
- On 9 May 2022, it was announced that Marc Goossens will be switching team to SpeedHouse for the 2022 season after driving for both DF1 Racing and CAAL Racing in the 2021 season. The same announcement also revealed that SpeedHouse team owner Lucas Lasserre will step down from his driving duties to focus on team management. His replacement in the No. 64 Ford Mustang is currently unknown, although the team confirms that they will only field Goossens, Alexander Graff, and Cosimo Barberini in EuroNASCAR PRO for this year.
- On 9 May 2022, NASCAR Whelen Euro Series announced on their social media account that Nicolò Rocca will be switching teams to Double V Racing for the 2022 season. The announcement was made after Rocca was initially announced to stay with DF1 Racing on 6 February 2022. The reasoning for the team switch is currently unknown.
- The official Entry List release for NASCAR GP Spain at Circuit Ricardo Tormo, which was first revealed on 10 May 2022, would reveal the following changes:
  - Ulysse Delsaux would move down to EuroNASCAR 2 as a result of RDV's downsizing from a two-car team to a single-car team.
  - French rally driver Yannick Panagiotis, who competed alongside NASCAR Whelen Euro Series CEO and founder Jerome Galpin at Dakar Rally this year, will be making his series debut as the driver of the No. 4 Ford Mustang entered by his own team Panasport.
  - Lithuanian driver Gustas Grinbergas, who briefly competed alongside current NASCAR Cup Series driver Cody Ware at Asian Le Mans Series with Rick Ware Racing, will make his stock car racing debut with Buggyra ZM Racing.
  - Former Mini Challenge driver Paolo Maria Silvestrini and Swiss driver Bruno Staub will make their Euro Series debut as the EuroNASCAR PRO class drivers of Not Only Motorsport's No. 25 Chevrolet Camaro and Racingfuel Motorsport's No. 94 Chevrolet Camaro respectively.
  - Slovakian driver Christian Malcharek will make his return to Euro Series after a six-year absence from the series. Malcharek will be competing in EuroNASCAR 2 with PK Carsport, whom he briefly made a one-off appearance with at the season opening round of the 2016 season.
  - Italian driver Roberto Benedetti will make his return to Euro Series with The Club Motorsport in the EuroNASCAR 2 division after his practice only appearance for the team at the season opening round of the 2020 season.

==== Teams ====
- On 23 November 2021, it was announced that SpeedHouse will be expanding into a two-car team in 2022. SpeedHouse has yet to announce the number and the body used for the team's second entry, although Paul Jouffreau is set to drive the car in the EuroNASCAR 2 division. Later on 9 March 2022, it was announced that SpeedHouse will be expanding further with the addition of the No. 14 Ford Mustang to accompany the No. 64 and No. TBA teams. Marco Raggi, who previously acted as Shadow Racing Cars' team principal for the past two seasons, will join the SpeedHouse team to become its new Sporting Manager.
- On 24 November 2021, it was announced that European Truck Racing Championship team Buggyra Racing will be expanding their operations to NASCAR Whelen Euro Series in 2022. Buggyra, who will be competing as Buggyra ZM Racing in EuroNASCAR, will field the No. 29 and No. 38 Ford Mustang for sisters Aliyyah and Yasmeen Koloc with sponsorship from Shandong Zero Mileage Lubrication.
- On 11 January 2022, it was revealed that one of Not Only Motorsport's teams will be changing numbers to No. 36 in 2022. Subsequent announcements would reveal that the No. 36 will act as Not Only's third team as the team is set to retain the No. 89 and No. 90 teams this year. This would mean that Not Only would set to field three cars for the first time after plans to run a third car in 2021 didn't materialized. Reports from Leadlap's exclusive interview with the team's new signing Alina Loibnegger on 17 March 2022 revealed that the team will be expanding further into a four-car team with the addition of the No. 00 team, which was reported to be using the team's No. 90 entry from last year. The No. 00 team was subsequently revealed to be part of the No. 25 team on the official Entry List release.
- On 2 February 2022, it was announced that Swiss organization Racingfuel GmbH will be making their series debut in 2022, fielding the No. 58 and No. 94 Chevrolet Camaro's under the Racingfuel Motorsport banner. The No. 58 car initially had its entry registered as the No. 93 car, but changed its number before the season opening round at Valencia.
- On 3 February 2022, it was announced that The Club Motorsport is planning to compete full-time for the 2022 season with the No. 55 Dinoil Chevrolet Camaro. This is scheduled to be The Club's first full-time campaign in EuroNASCAR after the team competed part-time for the last five seasons.
- On 4 February 2022, Hendriks Motorsport announced that the team will be scaling down to field just two cars for the 2022 season. The team would retain the No. 7 and No. 50 teams while the No. 18 team, which ran full-time in EuroNASCAR PRO with Giorgio Maggi last year, would be shut down.
- DF1 Racing will downscale to two cars after the team fielded a total of five cars throughout the 2021 season. The team will retain the No. 22 and No. 66 teams in 2022 whilst shutting down the No. 77 team and releasing the No. 23 and No. 44 entries to Team Bleekemolen.
- PK Carsport will be returning to the series after the team took a hiatus from full-time competition in EuroNASCAR last season. PK will only field a single car with the No. 24 team in the 2022 season.
- Vict Motorsport will be rebranded once again as the team is scheduled to use the Racers Motorsport name for the first time since 2019. The team will also enter into a partnership with JTG Daugherty Racing to field Leonardo Colavita in the 2022 season, which would also see the team renumber their No. 9 car to the No. 47 to reflect the partnership with JTG Daugherty. Racers would also retain the partnership with Italian team Scuderia Speed Motor to help field the team's No. 8 car in 2022.
- On 26 February 2022, it was announced that Race Art Technology will be rejoining the championship as a full entry to field Giorgio Maggi in the No. 18 Toyota Camry. Race Art Technology has previously fielded a full entry in 2018 before stepping down its involvement in the series to become a technical partner for Alex Caffi Motorsport and Academy Motorsport in the past two seasons.
- On 4 March 2022, Team Bleekemolen announced that the team will be expanding to a two-car team in 2022. Sebastiaan Bleekemolen had previously stated in an interview with Leadlap on 30 November 2021 that Team Bleekemolen is considering to enter two cars next year to allow all the three drivers that were signed with the team. Team Bleekemolen's No. 69 Ford Mustang will continue to compete full-time while the newly-expanded No. 72 Ford Mustang is scheduled to be fielded on selected events only.
- On 7 March 2022, it was announced that Finnish racing firm Iceboys will be joining forces with Team Bleekemolen, expanding Team Bleekemolen into a four-car entry in 2022. Iceboys will provide Team Bleekemolen with the No. 23 and No. 44 teams that were fielded under collaboration with DF1 Racing in 2021. The announcement also reveals that all four of Team Bleekemolen cars will be prepared in-house for the 2022 season.
- On 25 March 2022, Shadow Racing Cars announced that they will continue their participation in NASCAR Whelen Euro Series with a new team called MK1 Racing Italia. MK1 Racing Italia will be partnered with fellow Euro Series team Race Art Technology to field the team's two Shadow DNM8's in 2022. The announcement also revealed that the team's No. 42 car will be rebranded to the No. 16 car for the upcoming season.
- The official Entry List for the teams participating in the 2022 season, released on 25 March 2022, revealed the following changes to the teams participating in the 2022 season:
  - Solaris Motorsport and 42 Racing will be leaving the series after a four and three-year stay in the series respectively. Solaris' withdrawal meant that Double V Racing, who received technical support from the team last season, will operate as an independent team in 2022.
  - RDV Competition will be downscaling to just one car, retaining the No. 3 team whilst shutting down the No. 10 team for 2022.
  - SpeedHouse will be expanding further into a four-car team, revealing that two of the team's unannounced car numbers in 2022 will be No. 33 and No. 40.
- The official Entry List release for NASCAR GP Spain at Circuit Ricardo Tormo, which was first revealed on 10 May 2022, would reveal the following changes:
  - French team Panasport will be entering the series for the first time, fielding the No. 4 Ford Mustang for team owner Yannick Panagiotis in both classes.
  - The Club Motorsport will expand into a two-car team with the addition of the No. 65 Chevrolet Camaro driven by Riccardo Romagnoli and Roberto Benedetti.

==== Mid-season changes ====
- Tobias Dauenhauer was forced to miss American SpeedFest IX at Brands Hatch after he was tested positive for COVID-19. Liam Hezemans will replace Dauenhauer and compete in both classes as a result.
- On 9 June 2022, Buggyra ZM Racing announced that Yasmeen Koloc will not compete in the NASCAR Whelen Euro Series "for the time being". Buggyra cited Yasmeen's injury from a crash in the 24H Series race at Circuit de Spa-Francorchamps and preparation for her upcoming participation in the 2023 Dakar Rally as the reason of her withdrawal.
- On 4 July 2022, it was announced that Onofrio Veneziani's Double T team, who won the 2015 Elite 2 title with Gianmarco Ercoli, will be returning to the series after a six-year hiatus. Leonardo Colavita and the No. 47 team will be splitting off from Racers Motorsport to join the returning Double T team. MK1 Racing Italia will provide technical support for Double T to help field the No. 47 team.
- On 22 August 2022, an article posted on NASCAR Whelen Euro Series' official website revealed that Melvin de Groot will not participate in the NASCAR GP Czech Republic. Michael Bleekemolen will replace de Groot after the Entry List for NASCAR GP Czech Republic revealed that he will be transferred to Team Bleekemolen's No. 69 Ford Mustang team.
- On 24 August 2022, Advait Deodhar announced on social media that he will not continue his participation in the NASCAR Whelen Euro Series for the rest of the season. Deodhar currently plans to return for the 2023 season.
- Former EuroNASCAR PRO race winner Yann Zimmer will be making his return to the series at the NASCAR GP Czech Republic for his first start in 8 years. Zimmer is scheduled to compete with Racingfuel Motorsport's No. 94 team at Most.
- On 17 September 2022, former two-time series champion and PK Carsport team manager Anthony Kumpen announced that he will be returning to the series as a driver at the NASCAR GP Belgium. It will be Kumpen's first racing activity as a driver after he was suspended for four years after he failed a drug test during the 2018 24 Hours of Zolder. Kumpen will drive the No. 24 PK Carsport entry at Zolder, leaving Alon Day to join SpeedHouse in a one-off entry because Day's contract at PK in 2022 was only for five rounds.
- On 28 September 2022, it was announced that Kenko Miura, who competed in the NASCAR Camping World Truck Series for Reaume Brothers Racing earlier this year, would be returning to the Euro Series for his first race since 2020 in the fifth round at Circuit Zolder. Miura will be competing as an owner-driver for the newly debuting Team Japan NEEDS24 team.
- Yevgen Sokolovskiy will not participate in the season ending round at Rijeka after he was called up to represent Ukraine in the 2022 FIA Motorsport Games on the GT Relay category. His replacement in Marko Stipp Motorsport's No. 48 team is currently unknown.

== Schedule ==
The provisional calendar for the 2022 season was announced on 29 October 2021. All races of the 2022 season will be held on road courses, although the Winter Classic non-championship event is going to be held on an ice surface.

=== EuroNASCAR PRO ===
Round		Race title	Track	Date
1	R1	NASCAR GP Spain – Valencia NASCAR Fest	(Spain) Circuit Ricardo Tormo, Valencia	14 May
1	R2	NASCAR GP Spain – Valencia NASCAR Fest	(Spain) Circuit Ricardo Tormo, Valencia	15 May
2	R3	NASCAR GP UK – American SpeedFest IX	(United Kingdom) Brands Hatch (Indy), West Kingsdown	11 June
2	R4	NASCAR GP UK – American SpeedFest IX	(United Kingdom) Brands Hatch (Indy), West Kingsdown	12 June
3	R5	NASCAR GP Italy	(Italy) Autodromo Vallelunga, Campagnano di Roma	9 July
3	R6	NASCAR GP Italy	(Italy) Autodromo Vallelunga, Campagnano di Roma	10 July
4	R7	NASCAR GP Czech Republic – OMV MaxxMotion NASCAR Show	(Czech Republic) Autodrom Most, Most	3 September
4	R8	NASCAR GP Czech Republic – OMV MaxxMotion NASCAR Show	(Czech Republic) Autodrom Most, Most	4 September
5	R9	NASCAR GP Belgium	(Belgium) Circuit Zolder, Heusden-Zolder	8 October
5	R10	NASCAR GP Belgium	(Belgium) Circuit Zolder, Heusden-Zolder	9 October
6	R11	EuroNASCAR Finals – Fracasso NASCAR GP Croatia	(Croatia) Automotodrom Grobnik, Čavle	29 October
6	R12	EuroNASCAR Finals – Fracasso NASCAR GP Croatia	(Croatia) Automotodrom Grobnik, Čavle	30 October

=== EuroNASCAR 2 ===
Round		Race title	Track	Date
1	R1	NASCAR GP Spain – Valencia NASCAR Fest	(Spain) Circuit Ricardo Tormo, Valencia	14 May
1	R2	NASCAR GP Spain – Valencia NASCAR Fest	(Spain) Circuit Ricardo Tormo, Valencia	15 May
2	R3	NASCAR GP UK – American SpeedFest IX	(United Kingdom) Brands Hatch (Indy), West Kingsdown	11 June
2	R4	NASCAR GP UK – American SpeedFest IX	(United Kingdom) Brands Hatch (Indy), West Kingsdown	12 June
3	R5	NASCAR GP Italy	(Italy) Autodromo Vallelunga, Campagnano di Roma	9 July
3	R6	NASCAR GP Italy	(Italy) Autodromo Vallelunga, Campagnano di Roma	10 July
4	R7	NASCAR GP Czech Republic – OMV MaxxMotion NASCAR Show	(Czech Republic) Autodrom Most, Most	3 September
4	R8	NASCAR GP Czech Republic – OMV MaxxMotion NASCAR Show	(Czech Republic) Autodrom Most, Most	4 September
5	R9	NASCAR GP Belgium	(Belgium) Circuit Zolder, Heusden-Zolder	8 October
5	R10	NASCAR GP Belgium	(Belgium) Circuit Zolder, Heusden-Zolder	9 October
6	R11	EuroNASCAR Finals – Fracasso NASCAR GP Croatia	(Croatia) Automotodrom Grobnik, Čavle	29 October
6	R12	EuroNASCAR Finals – Fracasso NASCAR GP Croatia	(Croatia) Automotodrom Grobnik, Čavle	30 October

=== EuroNASCAR Club Challenge ===
Round	Race title	Track	Date
R1	NASCAR GP Spain – Valencia NASCAR Fest	(Spain) Circuit Ricardo Tormo, Valencia	13 May
R2	NASCAR GP Italy	(Italy) Autodromo Vallelunga, Campagnano di Roma	10 July
R3	NASCAR GP Czech Republic – OMV MaxxMotion NASCAR Show	(Czech Republic) Autodrom Most, Most	2 September
R4	NASCAR GP Belgium	(Belgium) Circuit Zolder, Heusden-Zolder	7 October
R5	EuroNASCAR Finals – Fracasso NASCAR GP Croatia	(Croatia) Automotodrom Grobnik, Čavle	28 October

=== Calendar changes ===
- NASCAR GP Germany at the Hockenheimring will be returning to the series after a two-year hiatus caused by the COVID-19 pandemic. Hockenheim is scheduled to host the opening round of the season on 9–10 April.
- NASCAR GP Spain at Circuit Ricardo Tormo will keep its May date as the second round of the season. Last year, the round hosted the opening round of the season but had its date moved from April to May due to the schedule changes caused by the COVID-19 pandemic.
- American SpeedFest, NASCAR Whelen Euro Series' round at Brands Hatch, will be returning to its traditional June date after the round was hosted on 3–4 July 2021 to coincide with the American Independence Day.
- NASCAR GP Italy will not host a championship round as Italy would host an All-Star Event in 2022. Autodromo Vallelunga will continue to host the All-Star Event, but on 4 November 2021 it was announced the track will use the Club Circuit layout instead of the International Circuit layout that was used in 2020 and 2021.
- NASCAR GP Czech Republic at Automotodrom Most is now scheduled to host the fourth round of the season, although they will keep the late August-early September date that the round had in 2021.
- NASCAR GP Croatia at Automotodrom Grobnik will be scheduled to host the season finale, marking the first occasion that Croatia will host the final round of a NASCAR Whelen Euro Series season. The round at Automotodrom Grobnik is scheduled to be held on 29–30 October, effectively taking over the slot vacated by NASCAR GP Italy.
- NASCAR Whelen Euro Series will be hosting NASCAR's first event on ice with the non-championship Winter Classic event that is scheduled to be held somewhere between late 2022 and early 2023. The venue and exact date of the event is currently unknown.
- On 25 February 2022, it was announced that NASCAR GP Germany at the Hockenheimring has been cancelled due to "ongoing difficult circumstances for the event". The round at Autodromo Vallelunga, which was previously due to host an All-Star round, will now host the NASCAR GP Italy championship round as a result. It is subsequently revealed that Vallelunga's full layout will be used for the 2022 edition of NASCAR GP Italy.

== Rule changes ==
- On 30 January 2022, NASCAR Whelen Euro Series announced the following changes to their qualifying format in 2022:
  - EuroNASCAR PRO's qualifying system will now consist of two phases of knockout qualifying, marking the return of the qualifying format that was last used in the 2019 season. The first Qualifying session will be shortened from 30 minutes to 15 minutes while the fastest 10 drivers from the Qualifying session will advance to the 5-minute long SuperPole session.
  - EuroNASCAR 2's qualifying system retains the single-round format that the series used for both classes in 2020 and 2021, although the Qualifying session time is shortened to 20 minutes.
- On 3 May 2022, NASCAR Whelen Euro Series announced a new partnership deal with VP Racing Fuels to become the new exclusive fuel supplier in the series, switching from a previously undisclosed fuel supplier. The series will now use VP's N20 Race Fuel, which incorporates 20% sustainable materials.

== Results ==
=== EuroNASCAR PRO ===
Round		Race	Pole position	Fastest lap	Most laps led	Winning driver	Winning team	Winning manufacturer
1	R1	Valencia NASCAR Fest	(Sweden) Alexander Graff	(Italy) Gianmarco Ercoli	(Italy) Nicolò Rocca	(Italy) Nicolò Rocca	(Italy) CAAL Racing	Chevrolet
1	R2	Valencia NASCAR Fest	(Italy) Gianmarco Ercoli	(Italy) Gianmarco Ercoli	(Italy) Gianmarco Ercoli	(Israel) Alon Day	(Belgium) PK Carsport	Chevrolet
2	R3	American Speedfest IX	(Italy) Nicolò Rocca	(Israel) Alon Day	(Italy) Nicolò Rocca	(Israel) Alon Day	(Belgium) PK Carsport	Chevrolet
2	R4	American Speedfest IX	(Israel) Alon Day	(Italy) Nicolò Rocca	(Israel) Alon Day	(Sweden) Alexander Graff	(France) SpeedHouse	Chevrolet
3	R5	NASCAR GP Italy	(Italy) Gianmarco Ercoli	(Israel) Alon Day	(Israel) Alon Day	(Israel) Alon Day	(Belgium) PK Carsport	Chevrolet
3	R6	NASCAR GP Italy	(Israel) Alon Day	(Israel) Alon Day	(Italy) Gianmarco Ercoli	(Italy) Gianmarco Ercoli	(Italy) CAAL Racing	Chevrolet
4	R7	OMV MaxxMotion NASCAR Show	(Israel) Alon Day	(Israel) Alon Day	(Netherlands) Sebastiaan Bleekemolen	(Netherlands) Sebastiaan Bleekemolen	(Netherlands) Team Bleekemolen	Ford
4	R8	OMV MaxxMotion NASCAR Show	(Israel) Alon Day	(Israel) Alon Day	(Israel) Alon Day	(Israel) Alon Day	(Belgium) PK Carsport	Chevrolet
5	R9	NASCAR GP Belgium	(Italy) Vittorio Ghirelli	(Italy) Gianmarco Ercoli	(Italy) Gianmarco Ercoli	(Italy) Gianmarco Ercoli	(Italy) CAAL Racing	Chevrolet
5	R10	NASCAR GP Belgium	(Italy) Gianmarco Ercoli	(Italy) Gianmarco Ercoli	(Italy) Gianmarco Ercoli	(Italy) Gianmarco Ercoli	(Italy) CAAL Racing	Chevrolet
6	R11	Fracasso NASCAR GP Croatia	(Israel) Alon Day	(Switzerland) Giorgio Maggi	(Israel) Alon Day	(Israel) Alon Day	(Belgium) PK Carsport	Chevrolet
6	R12	Fracasso NASCAR GP Croatia	(Switzerland) Giorgio Maggi	(Switzerland) Giorgio Maggi	(Switzerland) Giorgio Maggi	(France) Patrick Lemarié	(Italy) Academy Motorsport	EuroNASCAR FJ

=== EuroNASCAR 2 ===
Round		Race	Pole position	Fastest lap	Most laps led	Winning driver	Winning team	Winning manufacturer
1	R1	Valencia NASCAR Fest	(Cyprus) Vladimiros Tziortzis	(Cyprus) Vladimiros Tziortzis	(Cyprus) Vladimiros Tziortzis	(Cyprus) Vladimiros Tziortzis	(Italy) Academy Motorsport	EuroNASCAR FJ
1	R2	Valencia NASCAR Fest	(Cyprus) Vladimiros Tziortzis	(Cyprus) Vladimiros Tziortzis	(Cyprus) Vladimiros Tziortzis	(Italy) Alberto "Naska" Fontana (Note: Vladimiros Tziortzis originally won the race, but he received a 10-place position drop penalty due to technical infringements.)	(Italy) CAAL Racing	Chevrolet
2	R3	American Speedfest IX	(Cyprus) Vladimiros Tziortzis	(Cyprus) Vladimiros Tziortzis	(Cyprus) Vladimiros Tziortzis	(Italy) Alberto "Naska" Fontana	(Italy) CAAL Racing	Chevrolet
2	R4	American Speedfest IX	(Cyprus) Vladimiros Tziortzis	(Italy) Alberto "Naska" Fontana	(Italy) Alberto "Naska" Fontana	(Netherlands) Liam Hezemans	(Netherlands) Hendriks Motorsport	Ford
3	R5	NASCAR GP Italy	(Italy) Alberto "Naska" Fontana	(Cyprus) Vladimiros Tziortzis	(Italy) Alberto "Naska" Fontana	(Italy) Alberto "Naska" Fontana	(Italy) CAAL Racing	Chevrolet
3	R6	NASCAR GP Italy	(Cyprus) Vladimiros Tziortzis	(Netherlands) Liam Hezemans	(Netherlands) Liam Hezemans	(Netherlands) Liam Hezemans	(Netherlands) Hendriks Motorsport	Ford
4	R7	OMV MaxxMotion NASCAR Show	(Czech Republic) Martin Doubek	(Italy) Alberto "Naska" Fontana	(Italy) Alberto "Naska" Fontana	(Italy) Alberto "Naska" Fontana	(Italy) CAAL Racing	Chevrolet
4	R8	OMV MaxxMotion NASCAR Show	(Italy) Alberto "Naska" Fontana	(Czech Republic) Martin Doubek	(Italy) Alberto "Naska" Fontana	(Italy) Alberto "Naska" Fontana	(Italy) CAAL Racing	Chevrolet
5	R9	NASCAR GP Belgium	(Luxembourg) Gil Linster	(Netherlands) Liam Hezemans	(Netherlands) Liam Hezemans	(Netherlands) Liam Hezemans	(Netherlands) Hendriks Motorsport	Toyota
5	R10	NASCAR GP Belgium	(Netherlands) Liam Hezemans	(Italy) Alberto "Naska" Fontana	(Netherlands) Liam Hezemans	(Netherlands) Liam Hezemans	(Netherlands) Hendriks Motorsport	Toyota
6	R11	Fracasso NASCAR GP Croatia	(Cyprus) Vladimiros Tziortzis	(Cyprus) Vladimiros Tziortzis	(Netherlands) Liam Hezemans	(Netherlands) Liam Hezemans	(Netherlands) Hendriks Motorsport	Toyota
6	R12	Fracasso NASCAR GP Croatia	(Cyprus) Vladimiros Tziortzis	(Czech Republic) Martin Doubek	(Netherlands) Liam Hezemans	(Netherlands) Liam Hezemans	(Netherlands) Hendriks Motorsport	Toyota

=== EuroNASCAR Club Challenge ===
Round	Race	Winning driver	Winning team	Winning manufacturer
R1	NASCAR GP Spain – Valencia NASCAR Fest	(France) Néo Lambert	SpeedHouse	Ford
R2	NASCAR GP Italy	(United Kingdom) Gordon Barnes	Marko Stipp Motorsport	Chevrolet
R3	NASCAR GP Czech Republic – OMV MaxxMotion NASCAR Show	(Italy) Federico Monti	Academy Motorsport	EuroNASCAR FJ
R4	NASCAR GP Belgium	(France) Néo Lambert	SpeedHouse	Ford
R5	EuroNASCAR Finals – Fracasso NASCAR GP Croatia	(United Kingdom) Gordon Barnes	Marko Stipp Motorsport	Chevrolet

== Standings ==
Points are awarded to drivers and team using the current point system used in NASCAR Cup Series, NASCAR Xfinity Series, and NASCAR Camping World Truck Series, excluding the Stage and Race Winner bonus points. For the final round at Rijeka, double points are awarded. In addition, the driver that gained the most positions in a race will receive 4 bonus championship points.

For the EuroNASCAR PRO and EuroNASCAR 2 driver's championship, only the best 8 results from the first 10 races and the results from the double-points rewarding final round at Rijeka will count towards the final standings. For the Club Challenge championships, points are awarded per session and the results listed from each round in the standings are the combined results. For the Teams Championship, all points scored by a team's drivers will be counted with no dropped scores.

=== EuroNASCAR PRO ===
(key) Bold - Pole position awarded by fastest qualifying time (in Race 1) or by previous race's fastest lap (in Race 2). Italics - Fastest lap. * – Most laps led. ^ – Most positions gained.

Pos	Driver	(Spain) ESP		(United Kingdom) GBR		(Italy) ITA		(Czech Republic) CZE		(Belgium) BEL		(Croatia) CRO		Points
1	(Israel) Alon Day	4	1	1	(**16**)*	1*	**2**	**4**	**1***	11	(27)	**1***	3	425 (466)
2	(Sweden) Alexander Graff	**3**	5	(21)	1	5	5	2	2	8	(14)	9^	5^	405 (444)
3	(Italy) Gianmarco Ercoli	(26)	**2***	3	(26)	**23**	1*	3	3	1*	**1***	2	11	393 (415)
4	(Italy) Nicolò Rocca	1*	3	**2***	4	7	(22)	(24)	8	4	15	13	2	374 (402)
5	(Switzerland) Giorgio Maggi	6	18	5	2	2	3	20	6	3	(20)	4	**17***	357 (391)
6	(Netherlands) Sebastiaan Bleekemolen	(24)	9	11	12	9	(16)	1*	4	6	3	7	14	346 (385)
7	(France) Patrick Lemarié	17	23	9	8	6	(DNS)	(27)	7^	9	24	3	1	345 (355)
8	(Czech Republic) Martin Doubek	5	15	4	3	4	4	(21)	11	7	(25)	22	4	339 (367)
9	(France) Frédéric Gabillon	9	7	6	5	(25)	9	7	10	(10)	10	19	19	305 (344)
10	(Finland) Henri Tuomaala	13	16	12	(28)	12	7	19	21	14	(26)	8	7	300 (320)
11	(Italy) Fabrizio Armetta	23	(28)	7	11	(27)	10	18	16	13	4	15	8	296 (315)
12	(France) Romain Iannetta	14	4	8	9	8	6	(15)	(20)	12^	13	6	DNS^{2}	295 (329)
13	(Italy) Vittorio Ghirelli	25	(32)	(31)	10	3	18	11^	5	**2**	19	21	15	283 (293)
14	(Netherlands) Liam Hezemans			27	6	11	23	16	12	5	22	5	18	276
15	(Italy) Cosimo Barberini	11	(30)	15	24	18	12	10	13	(28)	11	17	10	276 (289)
16	(Belgium) Marc Goossens	22	6	10	(DNS)	20	(24)	23	22	15	21	10	6	273 (286)
17	(Italy) Max Lanza	8^	10	(DNS)	(DNS)	15	25	6	9	21	12	14	21	272
18	(Italy) Claudio Remigio Cappelli	(30)	25	25	13	(29)	20	9	26	29	6	11	9	251 (265)
19	(Italy) Riccardo Romagnoli	(29)	(31)	16	14	21	13	14	23	18	18	18	20	223 (230)
20	(Finland) Jonne Rautjärvi	19	20	17	(25)	(DNS)	26	13	14	22	5^	16	22	219 (230)
21	(Italy) Dario Caso	31	24	14	19	22	14^	22	17			23	12	215
23	(Italy) Leonardo Colavita	20	12	26	23			26	DNS	27	8	12	16	209
23	(Italy) Federico Monti	18	(29)	(30)	22	26	28	28	18	24	17	20	13	195 (209)
24	(Ukraine) Yevgen Sokolovskiy	12	(22)	20	15	16	8	8	19	19	(28)			179 (203)
25	(Greece) Thomas Krasonis	16	14^	32	29	28	11	25	25					116
26	(Italy) Davide Dallara	DNS	33	13	7^	13	27	DNS	24					109
27	(United Arab Emirates) Aliyyah Koloc	21	13	24	30	24	DNS	12	27					106
28	(Switzerland) Christoph Lenz			22	17	17^	21			20	29	Wth	Wth	100
29	(Italy) Nicolò Gabossi	27	19	23	21	DNS	Wth	17	28					86
30	(Germany) Tobias Dauenhauer	2	8											64
31	(Switzerland) Yann Zimmer							5	15					54
32	(Lithuania) Gustas Grinbergas	10	11											53
33	(Finland) Ian Eric Wadén	32	26	19	18									53
34	(Germany) Lucas Luhr	7	17											50
35	(Switzerland) Remo Lips									17	7			50
36	(France) Thomas Ferrando					10	17							47
37	(Belgium) Anthony Kumpen									26	2			46
38	(United Kingdom) Alex Sedgwick					14	15							45
39	(Italy) Bernardo Manfrè	28	21	28	27									44
40	(Japan) Kenko Miura									25	9			40
41	(Austria) Constantin Kletzer			18^	20									40
42	(Italy) Stefano Attianese					19	19							36
43	(Belgium) Pol van Pollaert									16	23			35
44	(France) Thomas Dombrowski									23	17			34
45	(France) Yannick Panagiotis	15	27											32
46	(Germany) Mike David Ortmann											DNS^{1}	DNS^{2}	20
47	(Norway) Eivind Brynildsen			29	DNS									8
	(Italy) Paolo Maria Silvestrini	Wth	Wth											
	(Switzerland) Bruno Staub	Wth	Wth											

Notes

- ^{1} – Mike David Ortmann received 8 championship points despite being a non-starter.
- ^{2} – Romain Iannetta and Mike David Ortmann received 12 championship points each despite being a non-starter.

=== EuroNASCAR 2 ===
(key) Bold - Pole position awarded by fastest qualifying time (in Race 1) or by previous race's fastest lap (in Race 2). Italics - Fastest lap. * – Most laps led. ^ – Most positions gained.

Pos	Driver	(Spain) ESP		(United Kingdom) GBR		(Italy) ITA		(Czech Republic) CZE		(Belgium) BEL		(Croatia) CRO		Points
1	(Netherlands) Liam Hezemans	6	3	3	1	3	1*	(18)	(13)	1*	**1***	1*	1*	453 (496)
2	(Italy) Alberto "Naska" Fontana	2	1	1	2*	**1***	(5)	1*	**1***	(24)	5^	2	3	444 (489)
3	(Cyprus) Vladimiros Tziortzis	**1***	**11***	**2***	**3**	2	(**26**)	3	3	25	(DNS)	**3**	**2**	388 (401)
4	(Czech Republic) Martin Doubek	3	2	4	4	7	(22)	**2**	2	(26)	16	4	5	386 (412)
5	(France) Ulysse Delsaux	5	4	6	6	(27)	4	(17)	5	7	4	11	7	367 (397)
6	(Finland) Tuomas Pöntinen			7	10	4	2	9	18	4	2	6	6	364
7	(Netherlands) Melvin de Groot	8	10	5	21	5	11			3	7	5	4	356
8	(Slovakia) Christian Malcharek	(27)	13	15^	(24)	6	6	15	8	18	6	8	8	330 (353)
9	(France) Paul Jouffreau	7	7	(26)	9	11	3	4	6	13	(21)	17	18	316 (343)
10	(Austria) Patrick Schober	13	(19)	14	8	10	7	(23)	7^	14	9	12	19	305 (337)
11	(Luxembourg) Gil Linster	4	5	11	18	(23)	8	7	4	**2**	(23)	13	26	298 (326)
12	(Italy) Luli del Castello	(21)	14	18	15	8	13	(19)	14	9	13	16	13	285 (319)
13	(Italy) Leonardo Colavita	12	8	25	11	13	12	(DNS)^{2}	(DNS)^{2}	5	20	9	20	280 (288)
14	(Italy) Roberto Benedetti	32	24	12	26	14^	17	13	19	16	11	14	11	273 (289)
15	(Italy) Claudio Remigio Cappelli			27	5	DNS	27	6	11	6	3	7	21	266
16	(Portugal) Miguel Gomes	9	17	10	13	(28)	15	12	10	(21)	12	24	25	252 (275)
17	(Austria) Alina Loibnegger	23	22	22	16	19	19	10	(23)	10	(24)	20	10	246 (273)
18	(France) Eric Quintal	19	20	24	27	20	20	14	17	11^	17	23	14	238 (261)
19	(Italy) Arianna Casoli	22	(23)	(29)	17^	21	21	16	16	12	19	21	17	230 (252)
20	(Netherlands) Michael Bleekemolen	(31)	(28)	17	23	17	18	21	20	8	15	18	22	228 (243)
21	(Italy) Paolo Valeri	30	29	20	22	22	16	20	21			19	9^	219
22	(Ukraine) Yevgen Sokolovskiy	11	(16)	13	14	16	10	5^	9	(17)	10			213 (254)
23	(Lithuania) Kasparas Vingilis	20	21	16	(29)	18	(25)	22	22	23	14	DNS^{3}	15	193 (213)
24	(United Arab Emirates) Aliyyah Koloc	17	27	28	12	9	14	8	12					169
25	(France) Néo Lambert					26	9^					10	23	125
26	(India) Advait Deodhar	28	9	8	19	15	24							119
27	(Germany) Matthias Hauer	26	26	DNS^{1}	25			11	15	20	22			119
28	(Italy) Dario Caso					24	23	PO	PO			22^	12	117
29	(Finland) Janne Koikkalainen	25	25	21	DNS	(DNS)	(DNS)	DNS^{2}	DNS^{2}	15	18			90
30	(Italy) Alberto Panebianco	33	32	9	7	25	DNS							81
31	(Switzerland) Thomas Toffel											15	24	70
32	(Italy) Francesco Garisto	29	6	19	28									67
33	(United Kingdom) Matthew Ellis			23	20	12	DNS							57
34	(Switzerland) Christoph Lenz	15	31							22	25	Wth	Wth	55
35	(France) Téo Calvet	16	12^											50
36	(Finland) Leevi Lintukanto	10	15											49
37	(Serbia) Zoran Kastratović											DNS^{3}	16	48
38	(Japan) Kenko Miura									19	8			47
39	(France) Yannick Panagiotis	18	18											38
40	(Italy) Andrea Tronconi	14^	33											31
41	(Italy) Alfredo de Matteo	24	30											20
42	(Germany) Hugo Sasse											DNS^{3}	DNS^{4}	8
43	(Italy) Paolo Maria Silvestrini					DNS	DNS							0
	(United Arab Emirates) Yasmeen Koloc	PO	PO											
	(Switzerland) Roger Mettler	PO	PO											

Notes

- ^{1} – Matthias Hauer received 5 championship points despite being a non-starter.
- ^{2} – Leonardo Colavita and Janne Koikkalainen received 4 championship points each despite being a non-starter.
- ^{3} – Kasparas Vingilis, Zoran Kastratović and Hugo Sasse received 6 championship points each despite being a non-starter.
- ^{4} – Hugo Sasse received 2 championship points despite being a non-starter.

=== EuroNASCAR Club Challenge ===
(key) Bold - Pole position awarded by fastest qualifying time (in Race 1) or by previous race's fastest lap (in Race 2). Italics - Fastest lap. * – Most laps led. ^ – Most positions gained.

Pos	Driver	(Spain) ESP	(Italy) ITA	(Czech Republic) CZE	(Belgium) BEL	(Croatia) CRO	Points
1	(United Kingdom) Gordon Barnes	2	1	3	2		303
2	(France) Néo Lambert	1	2	7	1		302
3	(Italy) Federico Monti	3	3	1	4		289
4	(France) Eric Quintal	9	4	4	3		273
5	(Italy) Arianna Casoli	4	6	5	7		268
6	(Austria) Andreas Kuchelbacher	5	8	2	9		266
7	(Austria) Julian Vanheelen	10	7	6			187
8	(France) Paul Jouffreau	6	9		5		187
9	(France) Thomas Dombrowski		5		6		135
10	(France) Oliver Panagiotis	7					63
11	(Czech Republic) Josef Machacek	8					63
12	(Australia) Maximilian Mason				8		63

=== Team's Championship (Top 15) ===
Pos	No.	Team	Body Style	EuroNASCAR PRO Driver(s)	EuroNASCAR 2 Driver(s)	Points
1	50	(Netherlands) Hendriks Motorsport-MOMO	Ford 3 Toyota 3	(Germany) Tobias Dauenhauer (Netherlands) Liam Hezemans	(Netherlands) Liam Hezemans	836
2	7	(Netherlands) Hendriks Motorsport-MOMO	Ford	(Czech Republic) Martin Doubek	(Czech Republic) Martin Doubek	779
3	24	(Belgium) PK Carsport	Chevrolet	(Israel) Alon Day (Belgium) Anthony Kumpen	(Slovakia) Christian Malcharek	769
4	69	(Netherlands) Team Bleekemolen	Ford	(Netherlands) Sebastiaan Bleekemolen	(Netherlands) Melvin de Groot (Netherlands) Michael Bleekemolen	769
5	5	(Italy) Academy Motorsport	EuroNASCAR FJ	(France) Patrick Lemarié	(Cyprus) Vladimiros Tziortzis	756
6	88	(Italy) CAAL Racing	Chevrolet	(Italy) Max Lanza	(Italy) Alberto "Naska" Fontana	751
7	3	(France) RDV Competition	Chevrolet	(France) Frédéric Gabillon	(France) Ulysse Delsaux	741
8	54	(Italy) CAAL Racing	Chevrolet	(Italy) Gianmarco Ercoli	(Italy) Luli del Castello	734
9	23	(Netherlands) Team Bleekemolen	Ford	(Finland) Henri Tuomaala	(Finland) Leevi Lintukanto (Finland) Tuomas Pöntinen	733
10	56	(Italy) CAAL Racing	Chevrolet	(Italy) Nicolò Rocca	(Luxembourg) Gil Linster	728
11	64	(France) SpeedHouse	Chevrolet 3 Ford 3	(Sweden) Alexander Graff	(France) Eric Quintal	705
12	33	(France) SpeedHouse	Ford	(Italy) Cosimo Barberini	(France) Paul Jouffreau	627
13	18	(Switzerland) Race Art Technology	Toyota	(Switzerland) Giorgio Maggi	(Italy) Claudio Remigio Cappelli (Switzerland) Thomas Toffel	625
14	46	(Germany) Marko Stipp Motorsport	Chevrolet	(France) Romain Iannetta	(Portugal) Miguel Gomes	609
15	14	(France) SpeedHouse	Chevrolet 3 Ford 3	(Belgium) Marc Goossens	(Italy) Arianna Casoli	538
Pos	No.	Team	Body Style	EuroNASCAR PRO Driver(s)	EuroNASCAR 2 Driver(s)	Points

== See also ==
- 2022 NASCAR Cup Series
- 2022 NASCAR Xfinity Series
- 2022 NASCAR Camping World Truck Series
- 2022 ARCA Menards Series
- 2022 ARCA Menards Series East
- 2022 ARCA Menards Series West
- 2022 NASCAR Whelen Modified Tour
- 2022 NASCAR Pinty's Series
- 2022 NASCAR Mexico Series
- 2022 SRX Series
- 2022 CARS Tour
- 2022 SMART Modified Tour
