= Gil Linster =

Luxembourgish racing driver

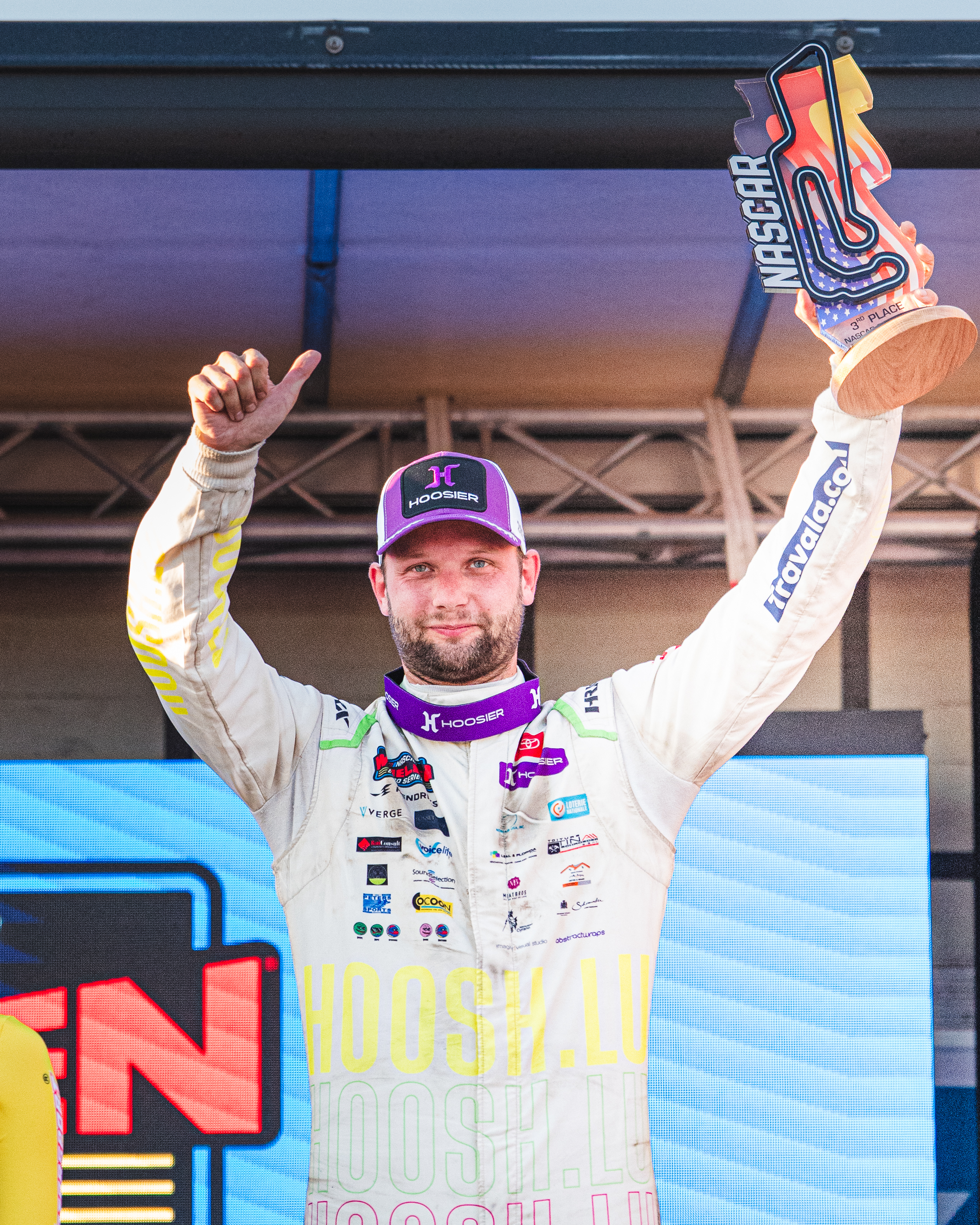
- Gil Linster during the 2024 NASCAR Whelen Euro Series round at Oschersleben
- Born: 3 November 1993 (age 33); Frisange, Luxembourg

ARCA Menards Series career
- 1 race run over 1 year
- Best finish: 81st (2024)
- First race: 2024 Hard Rock Bet 200 (Daytona)
Wins	Top tens	Poles
0	1	0
- Statistics up to date as of October 22, 2024.

Gil Linster (born November 3, 1993) is a Luxembourgish professional stock car racing driver who competes part-time in the NASCAR Euro Series driving the No. 30 Ford for Rette Jones Racing. He has previously competed in the ARCA Menards Series.

== Racing career ==
In 2017, Linster ran full-time in the NASCAR Whelen Euro Series Elite 2, driving the No. 44 Chevrolet for CAAL Racing, where he finished ninth in the standings with a best finish of fourth at the season ending race at Circuit Zolder. He returned with the team the following year, where he finished fifth in the standings with a best finish of fifth at Tours Speedway.

After not competing in the series for the next two years, Linster returned to the series in 2021, driving the No. 77 Chevrolet for DF1 Racing at Autodrom Most, Automotodrom Grobnik, and Zolder, where he earned a best finish of fifth at the second Most race.

In 2022, Linster ran the full Elite 2 schedule, returning to CAAL Racing to drive the No. 56 Chevrolet. Across the year, he earned six top-ten finishes, including a his first pole position at Zolder, and finished eleventh in the final points standings. Linster would leave the teams afterwards to drive the No. 50 Toyota for Hendriks Motorsport in 2023. After starting the season with eight straight finishes inside the top-five, he went on to get his first career win at Zolder later in the year to finish third in the points standings.

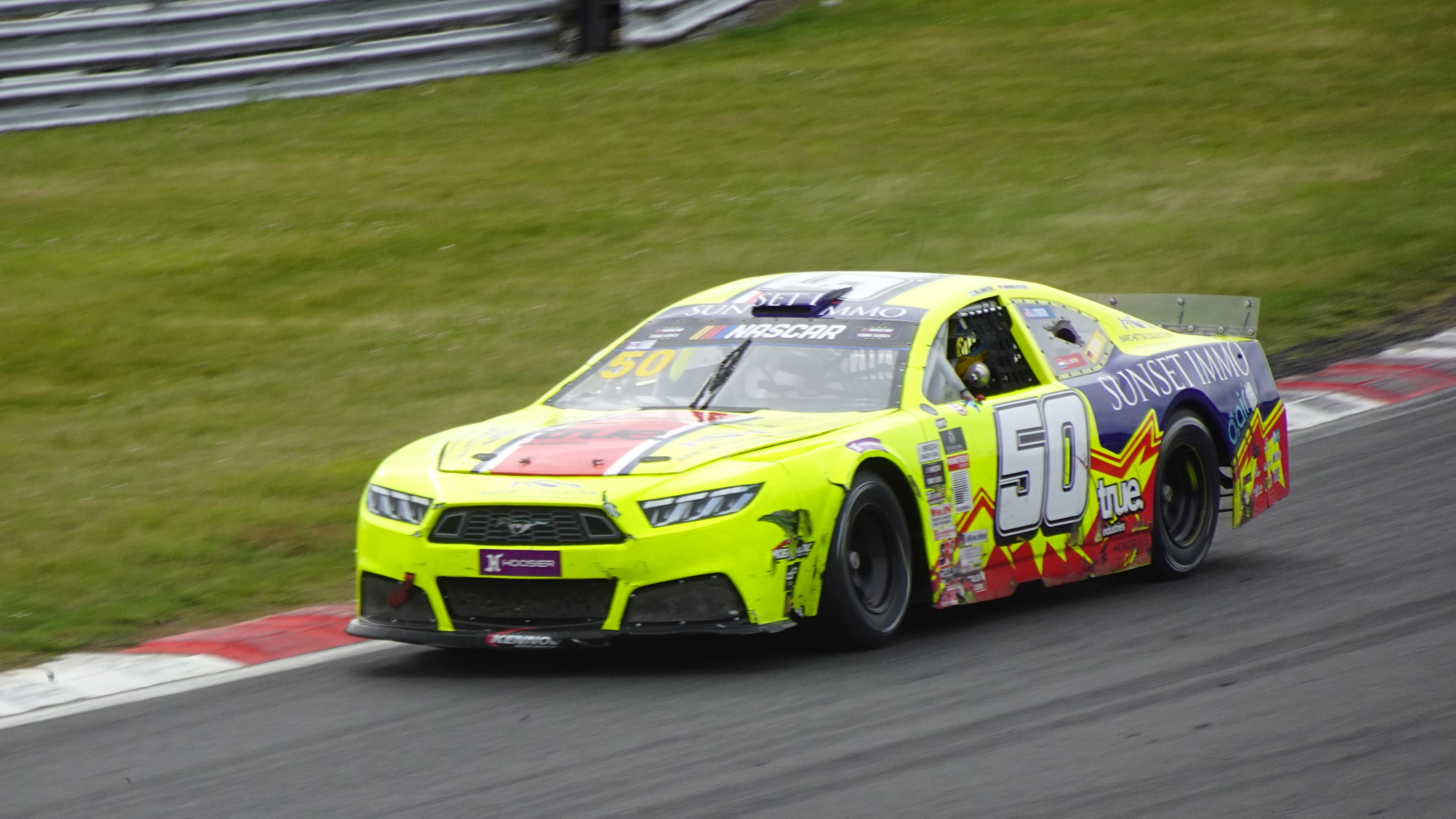
Linster racing at Brands Hatch in 2026

In 2024, Linster participated in pre-season testing for the ARCA Menards Series at Daytona International Speedway driving for Kimmel Racing in the No. 68 Ford. The opportunity came about after Linster competed in a late-model race at New Smyrna Speedway the previous year, where he went into contact with the team through his spotter for the New Smyrna race, Tony Blanchard. Several days after the test, it was announced that Linster would attempt to make his ARCA debut at Daytona with Kimmel Racing in the No. 68. Afterwards, it was announced that he would return to Hendriks Motorsport in the Euro Series in 2024.

== Motorsports career results ==
=== NASCAR ===
(key) (Bold – Pole position awarded by qualifying time. Italics – Pole position earned by points standings or practice time. * – Most laps led.)

==== Whelen Euro Series – EuroNASCAR 2 ====
(key) (Bold – Pole position. Italics – Fastest lap. * – Most laps led. ^ – Most positions gained)

NASCAR Whelen Euro Series – EuroNASCAR 2 results
Year	Team	No.	Make	1	2	3	4	5	6	7	8	9	10	11	12	NWES	Pts
2017	CAAL Racing	44	Chevy	VAL; 10	VAL; 20	BRH; 10	BRH; 10	VEN; 14	VEN; 5	HOC; 5	HOC; 5	FRA; 21	FRA; 21	ZOL; 9	ZOL; 4	9th	491
2018	CAAL Racing	44	Chevy	VAL; 9	VAL; 7	FRA; 6	FRA; 26	BRH; 10	BRH; 8	TOU; 5	TOU; 8	HOC; 16	HOC; 10	ZOL; 16	ZOL; 10	5th	423
2021	DF1 Racing	77	Chevy	ESP	ESP	GBR	GBR	CZE; 17	CZE; 5	CRO; 9	CRO; 9	BEL; 20	BEL; 11	ITA	ITA	23rd	156
2022	CAAL Racing	56	Chevy	ESP; 4	ESP; 5	GBR; 11	GBR; 18	ITA; 23	ITA; 8	CZE; 7	CZE; 4	**BEL**; 2	BEL; 23	CRO; 13	CRO; 26	11th	298
2023	Hendriks Motorsport	50	Toyota	ESP; 4	ESP; 4	GBR; 4	GBR; 5	ITA; 3	ITA; 4	CZE; 4	CZE; 4	GER; 18	GER; 7	BEL; 1	BEL; 6	3rd	406

=== ARCA Menards Series ===
(key) (Bold – Pole position awarded by qualifying time. Italics – Pole position earned by points standings or practice time. * – Most laps led. ** – All laps led.)

ARCA Menards Series results
Year	Team	No.	Make	1	2	3	4	5	6	7	8	9	10	11	12	13	14	15	16	17	18	19	20	AMSC	Pts	Ref
2024	Kimmel Racing	68	Ford	DAY; 7	PHO	TAL	DOV	KAN	CLT	IOW	MOH	BLN	IRP	SLM	ELK	MCH	ISF	MLW	DSF	GLN	BRI	KAN	TOL	81st	37	
