= Arianna Casoli =

- Nationality: Italian
- Born: March 5, 1974 (age 52) Reggio Emilia, Italy
- Teams: SpeedHouse Racing (2022–2025)
- Car number: 14
- Championships: NASCAR Whelen Euro Series

Championship titles
- 5× EuroNASCAR Lady Trophy; 1× EuroNASCAR Legend Trophy

Arianna Casoli (born 5 March 1974) is an Italian racing driver from Reggio Emilia who competes in the NASCAR Whelen Euro Series. She is one of the most successful female drivers in European NASCAR history, having won five Lady Trophy titles and one Legend Trophy (Over 40) championship in the EuroNASCAR2 division between 2016 and 2021.

In 2024, Casoli became the first woman to compete in the NASCAR Brasil Series.

== Early Life and Background ==
Born in Reggio Emilia, Italy, Casoli grew up in a motorsport-oriented family. Her father served as Sporting Director for the Alfa Romeo Formula One team during the 1980s. Throughout her childhood, she frequented European racing paddocks, attending events in the Renault R5 Cup, Formula 3, and Formula One.

Casoli graduated with a master's degree in architecture. She maintains a professional career as a graphic designer alongside her racing activities.

== Racing career ==
=== Early Career (1996-2002) ===
Casoli began her racing career in 1996 at the Magione Circuit, driving a Renault Clio 16V Cup car. She subsequently competed in various Italian touring car championships, including:

- Italian Renault Clio Cup (fielded by Giuliani Corse)
- Saxo Cup
- Rover MGF Cup
- Mini English Trophy
- Smart Thompson Micro Cup

She stopped racing in 2002 to focus on her architecture career and family.

=== Return to Racing (2013-2015) ===
In 2013, with support from friend and fellow driver Valentina Albanese, Casoli returned to competition in the Franciacorta 4-hour endurance race, driving a Seat Ibiza Cupra Cup. In 2015, she competed during the season of the Italian SEAT Ibiza Cup with Scuderia Girasole, participating in 10 of 12 scheduled races.

=== NASCAR Whelen Euro Series (2016-present) ===
==== 2016: Debut Season ====
In 2016, Casoli tested a NASCAR Whelen Euro Series car and made her debut at Valencia driving the No. 8 Ford Mustang for Vict Motorsport.

For the playoffs at Adria International Raceway and Circuit Zolder, she switched to the No. 56 Chevrolet SS fielded by CAAL Racing, shared with Italian driver Nicolò Rocca.

In her debut season, Casoli won the 2016 EuroNASCAR Lady Cup, scoring seven class wins and leading the championship from the opening round in Valencia to the finale in Belgium. She was honored at the NASCAR Hall of Fame in Charlotte in December 2016.

As Lady Cup winner, Casoli had the opportunity to test a NASCAR Late Model at New Smyrna Speedway with NASCAR champion Mike Skinner as her coach.

==== 2017-2021: CAAL Racing Era ====
From 2017 to 2021, Casoli competed for CAAL Racing in the No. 54 Chevrolet, sharing the entry with Alon Day (four-time NASCAR Whelen Euro Series Champion) and Gianmarco Ercoli. During this period, she won:

- 2× Lady Trophy titles
- 1× Legend Trophy (Over 40 category)

Her best overall result was a fifth-place finish at Zolder in 2020, and she finished 11th in the final 200-point standings.

==== 2022-2025: SpeedHouse Racing ====
In 2022, Casoli joined SpeedHouse Racing - the team owned by Lucas Lasserre, driving the No. 14 Ford Mustang in the OPEN division.

She won two times Lady Trophy titles (2023–2024).

She competed in rounds 1-2 of the 2025 NASCAR Euro Series season.

==== NASCAR Brasil Series (2024) ====
On 15–17 November 2024, Casoli made history as the first woman to compete in the NASCAR Brasil Series, participating in the final round at Curvelo, which also marked the inauguration of Brazil's first 100% oval circuit.

Her connection to Brazil stems from her father's professional work in the country during her childhood.

== Media and Public Profile ==
Casoli emerged as one of the most popular drivers in the NASCAR Whelen Euro Series, attracting significant fan engagement through autograph signings and social media. She co-hosted the Italian NWES television magazine on La3TV alongside former Formula One driver Alex Caffi and MotoGP champion Marco Lucchinelli.

== Racing Record ==
=== Career Highlights ===
- 5× EuroNASCAR Lady Trophy Champion (2016, 2019, 2021, 2023, 2024)
- 1× EuroNASCAR Legend Trophy Champion (Over 40)
- First woman to compete in the NASCAR Brasil Series (2024)
- over 50 class wins in EuroNASCAR Lady Cup
