= Nicolò Rocca =

Italian professional racing driver

- Nationality: (Italy) Italian
- Born: 14 December 1993 (age 32) Turin, Piedmont, Italy

NASCAR Whelen Euro Series career
- Debut season: 2013
- Current team: CAAL Racing
- Car number: 56
- Starts: 97 (EuroNASCAR PRO)
- Wins: 5 (EuroNASCAR PRO)
- Podiums: 20 (EuroNASCAR PRO)
- Poles: 9 (EuroNASCAR PRO)
- Fastest laps: 7 (EuroNASCAR PRO)
- Best finish: 3rd in 2019 (PRO)
- Finished last season: 4th in 2022

Previous series
- 2011-12: Formula Renault

Nicolò Rocca (born 14 December 1993 in Turin.) is an Italian professional racing driver that competed in the NASCAR Whelen Euro Series, driving most recently the No. 56 Chevrolet Camaro for CAAL Racing in the EuroNASCAR PRO class. His best result in the series is a 3rd place in 2019, at the wheel of the No. 24 Chevrolet Camaro of PK Carsport.

== Career ==
Rocca started his racing career in 2002 with karting. During his karting career, he raced across Italy and Europe, culminating with a KF3 season in 2008. He made his car racing debut in 2010, racing in Formula BMW in the 2010 Formula Lista Junior season for Daltec Racing, scoring multiple podiums.

In 2011, Rocca graduated to Formula Renault, racing in the Alps championship, for Interwetten Racing, with a best result of third in the opening round in Monza. Rocca's experience in Formula Renault continued in 2012, racing for GSK this time, in the Italian championship.

In 2013, Rocca switched to stock cars, taking part to his first NASCAR Whelen Euro championship in the PRO class, racing for Scorpus Racing. In 2014, he joined Caal Racing on the No.25 Chevrolet, finishing the season with a win at the Bologna Motorshow race, in December.

2015 was the breakthrough year for Rocca, which did see him scoring four pole positions in the first four races of the season, securing the best ever average qualifying position of the series, against teammates Alon Day and Eddie Cheever. He secured three wins and six podiums, which left him as the main title contender against Ander Vilarino going into the last race of the year in Zolder. A controversial contact with the local hero Anthony Kumpen hampered Rocca's chances to secure his first title.

Rocca returned to the wheel of the No. 56 Chevrolet Camaro of Caal Racing in 2016, finishing the season in fourth.

After only racing part time in 2017 and 2018, Rocca joined PK Carsport full time for the 2019 season, onboard of the No. 24 Chevrolet Camaro. Rocca scored the first podium of the season in Brands Hatch, after a race long battle with Alon Day and Stienes Longin, for then securing the first pole position and win with the new team in Most. Further podiums in Venray and in Hockenheimring left Rocca as the main title contender of Loris Hezemans getting into the last weekend of the season, which he eventually ended third after a luck-less last race.

For 2020, Rocca joined the Austrian team DF1 Racing, managing to bring the No.22 Chevrolet on the podium multiple times, continuing with them in 2021, and finishing the 2021 season in fourth.

In 2022, Rocca re-joined Caal Racing No.56 Chevrolet Camaro, starting off the season with a pole position and win in Valencia. Rocca ended leading the championship for most of the 2022 season, ending the season in fourth.

== Racing record ==
=== Racing career summary ===
Season	Series	Team	Races	Wins	Poles	F/Laps	Podiums	Points	Position
2010	Formula Lista Junior	Daltec Racing	12	0	0	0	1	40	9th
2011	Formula Renault 2.0 Alps Series	Daltec Racing	10	0	0	0	0	32	21st
2011	Formula 2000 Light	Daltec-Interwetten	2	0	0	0	0	0	NC†
2012	Formula Renault 2.0 Italia	GSK Grand Prix	4	0	0	0	0	11	30th
2013	NASCAR Whelen Euro Series – Elite	Scorpus Racing	10	0	0	0	0	403	14th
2014	NASCAR Whelen Euro Series – Elite 1	CAAL Racing	12	0	0	0	0	482	13th
2014	NASCAR Whelen Euro Series – Elite 2	CAAL Racing	2	0	0	0	1	65	44th
2015	NASCAR Whelen Euro Series – Elite 1	CAAL Racing	11	3	6	2	6	561	9th
2016	NASCAR Whelen Euro Series – Elite 1	CAAL Racing	12	0	0	0	2	553	4th
2018	NASCAR Whelen Euro Series – Elite 1	CAAL Racing	4	0	0	0	0	154	25th
2019	NASCAR Whelen Euro Series – Elite 1	PK Carsport	13	1	1	3	5	499	3rd
2020	NASCAR Whelen Euro Series – EuroNASCAR Pro	DF1 Racing	9	0	0	0	1	317	9th
2021	NASCAR Whelen Euro Series – EuroNASCAR Pro	DF1 Racing	12	0	0	0	2	394	4th
2022	NASCAR Whelen Euro Series – EuroNASCAR Pro	CAAL Racing	6	1	1	1	3	NC	NC

=== Complete Formula Renault 2.0 Alps Series results ===
(key) (Races in bold indicate pole position; races in italics indicate fastest lap)

Year	Team	1	2	3	4	5	6	7	8	9	10	11	12	13	14	Pos	Points
2011	Daltec Racing	MNZ; 1; 14	MNZ; 2; 13	IMO; 1; 16	IMO; 2 Ret	PAU; 1; 9	PAU; 2 Ret	RBR; 1; 13	RBR; 2 Ret	HUN; 1	HUN; 2	LEC; 1; 11	LEC; 2; 14	SPA; 1	SPA; 2	21st	32

=== Whelen Euro Series - EuroNASCAR PRO ===
(key) Bold - Pole position awarded by fastest qualifying time (in Race 1) or by previous race's fastest lap (in Race 2). Italics - Fastest lap. * – Most laps led. ^ – Most positions gained.)

NASCAR Whelen Euro Series - EuroNASCAR PRO results
Year	Team	No.	Make	1	2	3	4	5	6	7	8	9	10	11	12	13	NWES	Pts
2013	Scorpus Racing	19	Chevy	NOG; 10	NOG; 19	DIJ; 10	DIJ; 6	BRH; 7	BRH; 9	TOU; 18	TOU; 5	MNZ; 14	MNZ; 8	BUG	BUG		14th	403
2014	CAAL Racing	25	Chevy	VAL; 16	VAL; 21	BRH; 10	BRH; 8	TOU; 10	TOU; 10	NÜR; 20	NÜR; 5	UMB; 22	UMB; 9	BUG; 19	BUG; 12		13th	483
2015	CAAL Racing	56	Chevy	**VAL**; 3	VAL; 11	**VEN**; 1*	**VEN**; 7*	**BRH**; 18	BRH; 21	**TOU**; 1*	TOU; 3	UMB; 3	UMB; 1	ZOL; 18	ZOL; DNS		9th	561
2016	CAAL Racing	56	Chevy	VAL; 4	VAL; 21	VEN; 4	VEN; 7	BRH; 20	BRH; 6	TOU; 5	TOU; 3	ADR; 4	ADR; 6	ZOL; 3	ZOL; 20		4th	553
2018	CAAL Racing	56	Chevy	VAL	VAL	FRA	FRA	BRH; 9	BRH; 21	TOU	TOU	HOC	HOC	ZOL; 5	ZOL; 17		25th	154
2019	PK Carsport	24	Chevy	VAL; 5	VAL; 5	FRA; 6	FRA; 5	BRH; 3	BRH; 9	**MOS**; 1*	**MOS**; 11	VEN; 2	HOC; 2	HOC; 2	ZOL; 24	ZOL; 8	3rd	499
2020	DF1 Racing	22	Chevy	ITA; 8	ITA; 8	BEL; 8	BEL; DNS	CRO; 10	CRO; 13	ESP1; 15	ESP1; 4	ESP2; 15	ESP2; 3				9th	317
2021	DF1 Racing	22	Chevy	ESP; 2	ESP; 5	GBR; 3	GBR; 8	CZE; 5	CZE; 10	CRO; 7	CRO; 7	BEL; 5	BEL; 4	ITA; 4	ITA; 6		4th	394
2022	CAAL Racing	56	Chevy	**VAL**; 1	VAL; 3	**GBR**; 2	GBR; 4	ITA; 7	ITA; DNF	CZE; 24	CZE; 8	BEL; 4	BEL; 15	CRO; 13	CRO; 2		4th	374
