= CAAL Racing =

Italian racing team

(Italy) CAAL Racing
- Base: Todi, Province of Perugia
- Team principal(s): Luca Canneori
- Current series: NASCAR Whelen Euro Series
- Former series: Superstars Series; Euro V8 Series
- Current drivers: EuroNASCAR V8GP: 54. Giovanni Cartechini; EuroNASCAR OPEN: 54. Claudio Capelli; 73. Valentino Gambarotto; EuroNASCAR Rookie Challenge: 73. Jacob Parry
- Teams' Championships: Campionato Italiano Superstars: 2004–2005, 2009; International Superstars Series: 2007–2008
- Drivers' Championships: Campionato Italiano Superstars: 2004: Francesco Ascani; International Superstars Series: 2007: Giuliano Alessi; 2008: Stefano Gabellini; NASCAR Whelen Euro Series: 2017–2018: Alon Day

CAAL Racing is an Italian racing team based in Todi, Province of Perugia that currently competes in the NASCAR Whelen Euro Series. The team has won the Elite 1 championship twice in the NASCAR Whelen Euro Series as well as winning the team championship five times in the defunct Superstars Series. The team priorly fielded the No. 54 Chevrolet Camaro for Gianmarco Ercoli and Luli del Castello, the No. 56 Chevrolet Camaro for Nicolò Rocca and Gil Linster, and the No. 88 Chevrolet Camaro for Max Lanza and Alberto "Naska" Fontana and is currently fielding the No. 54 Ford Mustang for Giovanni Cartechini and Claudio Capelli and the No. 73 Ford Mustang for Valentino Gambarotto and Jacob Parry.

== History ==
=== Superstars Series ===
CAAL Racing has been active in the Superstars Series since its inaugural season in 2004. The team fielded Francesco Ascani in a BMW M5 E39. The Italian driver won races at Varano and Monza. Ascani won the inaugural season of the start up series beating the only other full time driver, Mauro Simoncini, by 14 points. The following season the team, as well as the series, expanded. Ascani was retained by the team and two part-time drivers, Leonardo Baccarelli and Albert Colajanni joined the line-up. Ascani won the opening race at Adria and the team scored three more podium finishes clinching the team championship again.

In 2006 the team was beaten by Audi Sport Italia for the teams championship. Marco Gregori was the team's best driver placing fourth in the series championship. Ascani raced a new BMW 550i E60. The team continued to enter the BMW M5 E39 alongside the BMW 550i E60 in 2007. The team entered eleven different drivers in its three cars during the season. Only Giuliano Alessi raced all rounds scoring four podium finishes in the overall championship. The Italian won the International Superstars Series winning at Adria and Vallelunga. CAAL Racing driver Stefano Gabellini was very successful in 2008 winning two races in the overall championship. He finished second in the series standings, behind Gianni Morbidelli. Gabellini won the International Superstars Series. Gabellini again finished second in the overall series in 2009.

For 2010 the team switched from the BMW to the Mercedes C63 AMG. CAAL Racing driver Luigi Ferrara won both opening races at Monza. Scoring five more podium finishes Ferrara finished third in the series standings. Ferrari also finished third in the series championship in 2011 winning one race, at Misano. For 2012 Vitantonio Liuzzi was the series only full time driver. The team also received factory support from Mercedes-AMG. Liuzzi was the best Mercedes driver finishing second in the series championship. The former Formula 1 driver won at Monza and the Hungaroring.

The 2013 season was the last Superstars Series season in its original form. Liuzzi left the team to join Romeo Ferraris. None of the four teams drivers competed all the rounds, nor achieved major results. Financial reasons caused the series to reform as the EuroV8 Series for 2014. Diego Romanini scored the best results for the team with a third place at the season finale at the Hockenheimring.

=== NASCAR Whelen Euro Series ===
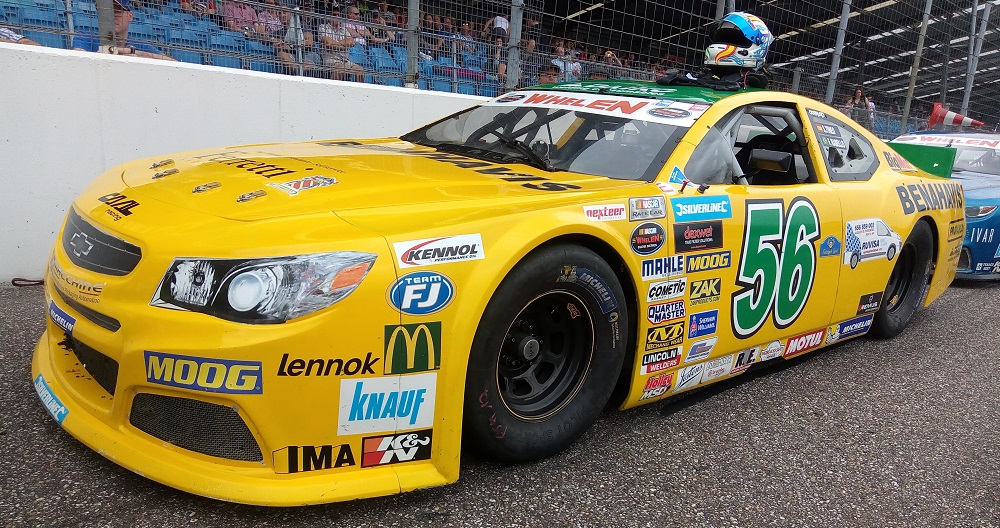
The car used by CAAL Racing's Salvador Tineo Arroyo in 2017

In 2013 the team debuted in the NASCAR Whelen Euro Series in the final two rounds at Monza and Le Mans. Fabrizio Armetta noted the best result, a fifth place in the Elite 1 class and two fourth places in Elite 2. After the strong outing, the team decided to enter three cars for the 2014 season. Eddie Cheever III, who raced his first season out of single-seaters, was the team's star performer. Cheever won races at Brands Hatch, Magione and the season finale at Le Mans. The Italian-American finished third in the Elite 1 series standings. Cheever remained for 2015 winning the season opener at Valencia. In the course of the season Cheever was surpassed by series newcomer Alon Day. Day won at Magione and both races at Zolder. The third car was manned by Nicolò Rocca who won at Venray, Tours and Magione. Despite the team winning seven out of twelve races, the series championship was won by Ander Vilariño with TFT Racing. Day was the best placed driver in the championship finishing second. The 2016 season was less successful with only Day remaining with the team, again winning three races. Day won races at Valencia, Brands Hatch and Adria. As he struggled on the ovals at Venray and Tours, taking only one top five finish, Day finished third in the championship standings.

For the 2019 season, the team initially fielded two cars: The No. 31 team driven by Mauro Trione and Meisam Taheri, and the No. 54 team driven by Alon Day and Arianna Casoli. Moreno di Silvestre would later replace Taheri at Franciacorta before Advait Deodhar took over the seat starting from Brands Hatch. CAAL would later take over the No. 27 entry from Alex Caffi Motorsport starting from the fourth race week of the season at Autodrom Most, bringing its drivers Thomas Ferrando and Pierluigi Veronesi to the team as well. Day scored three wins that year but was relegated to fourth in the standings after scoring three retirements. Ferrando would score his maiden Elite 1 victory that year in the penultimate race at Circuit Zolder whilst Deodhar finished fourth in the Elite 2 standings after scoring his maiden podium finish at Brands Hatch.

Day left the team at the end of the 2019 season and CAAL would resign former driver Gianmarco Ercoli to replace Day in the No. 54 team for 2020. Despite the season was affected by the COVID-19 pandemic, CAAL expanded into a four-car team that year by adding the No. 98 Ford Mustang team, driven by Marc Goossens and Dylan Derdaele, to the team's roster. The team also renumbered the No. 27 entry to the No. 88 car and signed Max Lanza to join Thomas Ferrando in the team for that year. CAAL only won one race that year, courtesy of Ercoli at Vallelunga, and Goossens would finish the season as the team's best finishing driver in fifth place.

CAAL downscaled into a three-car team in 2021, shutting down the team's No. 31 entry following Mauro Trione's retirement in the off-season and renumbering the team's No. 98 entry to the No. 56 entry. The team resigned Alon Day and Advait Deodhar after both drivers left the team in 2020, with Day rejoining after PK Carsport withdrew from that year's championship whilst Deodhar rejoined after he took a hiatus in 2020 due to the effects of the pandemic. Day, who competed with the No. 88 team, won three races that year but was unable to defend his title after scoring four retirements. Ercoli, who won one race at Rijeka that year, went on to score his best year in the PRO class so far after he finished second in the championship, just three points off that year's champion Loris Hezemans. Deodhar would become the first Indian driver to win a race in a NASCAR-sanctioned championship after he won from pole position in the first race at Brands Hatch.

Day, Deodhar, and Arianna Casoli all left CAAL at the end of the 2021 season. Day left to rejoin PK after the team rejoined the championship in 2022 whilst Deodhar and Casoli switched teams to Not Only Motorsport and SpeedHouse respectively. Luli del Castello was signed by the team to replace Casoli in the No. 54 team whilst Max Lanza was promoted to EuroNASCAR PRO to replace Day's vacated seat in the No. 88 team. The team also signed Alberto Fontana, better known as the YouTube content creator Alberto Naska, to partner Lanza as the No. 88 team's new EuroNASCAR 2 driver. Former drivers Nicolò Rocca and Gil Linster would rejoined the team to drive the No. 56 entry that year.

In 2023, the team fields in the No. 54 car Gianmarco Ercoli for EuroNascar PRO and Alberto Fontana for EuroNascar 2. In the No. 56 car Marc Goossens is racing in EuroNascar PRO and Sven van Laere in EuroNascar 2, whilst in the No. 88 Max Lanza is racing in EuroNascar PRO and Roberto Benedetti in EuroNascar 2. Gil Linster switched to Hendrick Motorsports (HMS) driving No. 50 car in EuroNascar 2, whilst 2022 EuroNascar 2 champion Liam Hezemans is driving the Toyota Camry in EuroNascar PRO.

== Complete NASCAR results ==
=== Complete NASCAR Whelen Euro Series - Elite 1 results ===
(key) (Bold – Pole position awarded by qualifying time. Italics – Pole position earned by points standings or practice time. * – Most laps led.)

NASCAR Whelen Euro Series - Elite 1
Year	Car	No.	Drivers	1	2	3	4	5	6	7	8	9	10	11	12	Pos.	Pts
2013	Chevrolet SS	54	(Italy) Stefano Gabellini	NOG	NOG	DIJ	DIJ	BRH	BRH	TOU	TOU	MON; 10	MON; 11			26th	134
2013	Chevrolet SS	54	(Italy) Fabrizio Armetta											LEM; 7	LEM; 5	24th	152
2014	Chevrolet SS	31	(Italy) Fabrizio Armetta	VAL; 5	VAL; 26	BRH; 11	BRH; 7	TOU; 11	TOU; 12	NUR; 22	NUR; 4	UMB; 17	UMB; 11	LEM; 4	LEM; 9	8th	560
2014	Chevrolet SS	25	(Italy) Nicolò Rocca	VAL; 16	VAL; 21	BRH; 10	BRH; 8	TOU; 10	TOU; 10	NUR; 20	NUR; 5	UMB; DNQ	UMB; 9	LEM; 19	LEM; 12	13th	482
2014	Chevrolet SS	51	(Italy) Eddie Cheever III	VAL; 4	VAL; 6	BRH; 1	BRH; 26	TOU; 2	TOU; 22	NUR; 7	NUR; 6	UMB; 3	UMB; 1	LEM; 8	LEM; 1	3rd	625
2015	Chevrolet SS	51	(Italy) Eddie Cheever III	VAL; 1	VAL; 4	VEN; 6	VEN; 5	BRH; 4	BRH; 9	TOU; 6	TOU; 7	UMB; 19	UMB; 18	ZOL; 2	ZOL; 2	5th	599
2015	Chevrolet SS	54	(Israel) Alon Day	VAL; 9	VAL; 19	VEN; 11	VEN; 9	BRH; 10	BRH; 3	TOU; 4	TOU; 8	UMB; 1	UMB; 16	ZOL; 1	ZOL; 1	2nd	627
2015	Chevrolet SS	56	(Italy) Nicolò Rocca	VAL; 3	VAL; 11	VEN; 1	VEN; 7	BRH; 18	BRH; DNS	TOU; 1	TOU; 3	UMB; 3	UMB; 1	ZOL; 18	ZOL; DNS	9th	561
2016	Chevrolet SS	44	(Sweden) Freddy Nordström	VAL; 19	VAL; 6	VEN; 23	VEN; 20	BRH; 6	BRH; 8	TOU; 13	TOU; 8	ADR; 6	ADR; 23	ZOL; 6	ZOL; 13	10th	494
2016	Chevrolet SS	54	(Israel) Alon Day	VAL; 6	VAL; 1	VEN; 16	VEN; 13	BRH; 3	BRH; 1	TOU; 16	TOU; 4	ADR; 2	ADR; 1	ZOL; 7	ZOL; 3	3rd	614
2016	Chevrolet SS	56	(Italy) Nicolò Rocca	VAL; 4	VAL; 21	VEN; 4	VEN; 7	BRH; 20	BRH; 6	TOU; 5	TOU; 3	ADR; 4	ADR; 6	ZOL; 3	ZOL; 20	4th	553

=== Complete NASCAR Whelen Euro Series - Elite 2 results ===
(key) (Bold – Pole position awarded by qualifying time. Italics – Pole position earned by points standings or practice time. * – Most laps led.)

NASCAR Whelen Euro Series - Elite 2
Year	Car	No.	Drivers	1	2	3	4	5	6	7	8	9	10	11	12	Pos.	Pts
2013	Chevrolet SS	54	(Italy) Lino Curti	NOG	NOG	DIJ	DIJ	BRH	BRH	TOU	TOU	MON; 12	MON; 7			24th	138
2013	Chevrolet SS	54	(Italy) Fabrizio Armetta											LEM; 4	LEM; 4	19th	298
2014	Chevrolet SS	25	(Italy) Nicolò Rocca	VAL; 2	VAL; 22											40th	65
2014	Chevrolet SS	25	(Italy) Luca Pirri Ardizzone			BRH; 6	BRH; 20			NUR; 5	NUR; DNS					32nd	135
2014	Chevrolet SS	25	(Italy) Lorenzo Marcuci					TOU; 8	TOU; 25							45th	58
2014	Chevrolet SS	25	(Italy) Gianmarco Ercoli									UMB; 2	UMB; 13	LEM; 2	LEM; 16	11th	487
2014	Chevrolet SS	31	(Italy) Francesca Linossi	VAL; 22	VAL; DNS											20th	202
2014	Chevrolet SS	31	(Italy) Gianmarco Ercoli			BRH; 25	BRH; 7	TOU; 10	TOU; 24	NUR; 4	NUR; 17					11th	487
2014	Chevrolet SS	31	(Italy) Leonardo Baccarelli									UMB; 9	UMB; 10	LEM	LEM	29th	138
2014	Chevrolet SS	51	(Italy) Simone Laureti	VAL; 9	VAL; 20	BRH; 12	BRH; 10	TOU; 7	TOU; 20	NUR; 10	NUR; 6	UMB; 5	UMB; 2	LEM; 21	LEM; 9	6th	548
2015	Chevrolet SS	51d	(Spain) Salvador Tineo Arroyo	VAL	VAL	VEN; 3	VEN; 5	BRH; 3	BRH; 2	TOU; 6	TOU; 4	UMB; 3	UMB; 1	ZOL; 2	ZOL; 17	5th	620
2015	Chevrolet SS	54	(France) Carole Perrin	VAL; 11	VAL; 9	VEN; 10	VEN; 18	BRH; 21	BRH; 11	TOU; 10	TOU; 15	UMB; 14	UMB; 10	ZOL; 16	ZOL; 6	10th	519
2015	Chevrolet SS	56	(Spain) Nicolò Rocca	VAL; 23	VAL; DNQ	VEN	VEN	BRH	BRH							-	0
2015	Chevrolet SS	56	(Belgium) Guillaume Deflandre							TOU; 20	TOU; 20					13th	440
2015	Chevrolet SS	56	(Italy) Leonardo Baccarelli									UMB; 16	UMB; 22	ZOL; 18	ZOL; 15	21st	210
2016	Chevrolet SS	44	(Germany) Justin Kunz	VAL; 12	VAL; 17	VEN; 18	VEN; DNS	BRH; 14	BRH; 13	TOU; 10	TOU; 11	ADR; 8	ADR; 5	ZOL; 20	ZOL; 7	10th	491
2016	Chevrolet SS	54	(Spain) Salvador Tineo Arroyo	VAL; 2	VAL; 2	VEN; 4	VEN; 5	BRH; 3	BRH; 1	TOU; 4	TOU; 6	ADR; 19	ADR; 3	ZOL; 17	ZOL; 2	4th	571
2016	Chevrolet SS	56	(Belgium) Guillaume Deflandre	VAL; 3	VAL; 3	VEN; 24	VEN; 10	BRH; 4	BRH; 22	TOU; 12	TOU; 4					7th	504
2016	Chevrolet SS	56	(Italy) Arianna Casoli									ADR; 15	ADR; 17	ZOL; 29	ZOL; 20	19th	404
