= Make it Your Race =

Swiss television series

Make it Your Race was a Swiss television series produced by Abarth TV in which amateurs learned to drive racing cars. It also had an Italian version.
