= 2017 Johnsonville 180 =

23rd race of the 2017 NASCAR Xfinity Series

Race details
- Race 23 of 33 in the 2017 NASCAR Xfinity Series
- The 2017 Johnsonville 180 program cover.
- Date: August 27, 2017
- Official name: Eighth Annual Johnsonville 180
- Location: Elkhart Lake, Wisconsin, Road America
- Course: Permanent racing facility
- Course length: 4.048 miles (6.515 km)
- Distance: 45 laps, 182.16 mi (293.16 km)
- Scheduled distance: 45 laps, 182.16 mi (293.16 km)
- Average speed: 82.250 mph (132.369 km/h)

Pole position
Driver	Austin Cindric	Team Penske
- Grid positions set by competition-based formula

Most laps led
Driver	James Davison	Joe Gibbs Racing
- Laps: 11

Winner
No. 51	Jeremy Clements	Jeremy Clements Racing

Television in the United States
- Network: NBC
- Announcers: Dave Burns, Dale Jarrett

Radio in the United States
- Radio: Motor Racing Network

The 2017 Johnsonville 180 was the 23rd stock car race of the 2017 NASCAR Xfinity Series season, and the eighth iteration of the event. The race was held on Sunday, August 27, 2017, in Elkhart Lake, Wisconsin at Road America, a 4.048 miles (6.515 km) permanent road course. The race took the scheduled 45 laps to complete. Jeremy Clements, driving for his family owned team, Jeremy Clements Racing, came home with the upset win, after an exciting battle with Matt Tifft. With two laps to go, Clements and Tifft collided, causing them to both spin out. Clements was able to get in front of Tifft, and would lead the last lap for his first career NASCAR Xfinity Series win. Tifft would end up finishing in 3rd, with Michael Annett finishing in 2nd.

== Background ==
The race was held at Road America, which is a motorsport road course located near Elkhart Lake, Wisconsin, United States on Wisconsin Highway 67. It has hosted races since the 1950s and currently hosts races in the NASCAR Cup and Xfinity Series, WeatherTech SportsCar Championship, IndyCar Series, SCCA Pirelli World Challenge, ASRA, AMA Superbike series, and SCCA Pro Racing's Trans-Am Series.

=== Entry list ===
- (R) denotes rookie driver.
- (i) denotes driver who is ineligible for series driver points.

#	Driver	Team	Make
00	Cole Custer (R)	Stewart–Haas Racing	Ford
0	Garrett Smithley	JD Motorsports	Chevrolet
01	Sheldon Creed	JD Motorsports	Chevrolet
1	Elliott Sadler	JR Motorsports	Chevrolet
2	Ben Kennedy (R)	Richard Childress Racing	Chevrolet
3	Scott Lagasse Jr.	Richard Childress Racing	Chevrolet
4	Ross Chastain	JD Motorsports	Chevrolet
5	Michael Annett	JR Motorsports	Chevrolet
07	Ryan Ellis	SS-Green Light Racing	Chevrolet
7	Justin Allgaier	JR Motorsports	Chevrolet
8	Josh Bilicki	B. J. McLeod Motorsports	Chevrolet
9	William Byron (R)	JR Motorsports	Chevrolet
11	Blake Koch	Kaulig Racing	Chevrolet
13	Ernie Francis Jr.	MBM Motorsports	Toyota
14	J. J. Yeley	TriStar Motorsports	Toyota
16	Ryan Reed	Roush Fenway Racing	Ford
17	Nicolas Hammann	Rick Ware Racing	Dodge
18	Christopher Bell (i)	Joe Gibbs Racing	Toyota
19	Matt Tifft (R)	Joe Gibbs Racing	Toyota
20	James Davison	Joe Gibbs Racing	Toyota
21	Daniel Hemric (R)	Richard Childress Racing	Chevrolet
22	Austin Cindric (i)	Team Penske	Ford
23	Spencer Gallagher (R)	GMS Racing	Chevrolet
24	Dylan Lupton	JGL Racing	Toyota
28	Dakoda Armstrong	JGL Racing	Toyota
33	Brandon Jones	Richard Childress Racing	Chevrolet
39	Ryan Sieg	RSS Racing	Chevrolet
40	Tim Cowen	MBM Motorsports	Dodge
42	Justin Marks	Chip Ganassi Racing	Chevrolet
46	Parker Kligerman (i)	Precision Performance Motorsports	Chevrolet
48	Brennan Poole	Chip Ganassi Racing	Chevrolet
51	Jeremy Clements	Jeremy Clements Racing	Chevrolet
52	Joey Gase	Jimmy Means Racing	Chevrolet
62	Brendan Gaughan	Richard Childress Racing	Chevrolet
74	John Graham	Mike Harmon Racing	Chevrolet
78	Stephen Young	B. J. McLeod Motorsports	Chevrolet
90	Dexter Bean	DGM Racing	Chevrolet
93	Jeff Green	RSS Racing	Chevrolet
98	Casey Mears	Biagi-DenBeste Racing	Ford
99	David Starr	BJMM with SS-Green Light Racing	Chevrolet
Official entry list

== Practice ==
=== First practice ===
The first 55-minute practice session was held on Saturday, August 26, at 1:00 PM CST. Justin Marks, driving for Chip Ganassi Racing, would set the fastest time in the session, with a lap of 2:15.029 and an average speed of 107.923 mph (173.685 km/h).

Pos	#	Driver	Team	Make	Time	Speed
1	42	Justin Marks	Chip Ganassi Racing	Chevrolet	2:15.029	107.923
2	48	Brennan Poole	Chip Ganassi Racing	Chevrolet	2:15.126	107.846
3	22	Austin Cindric (i)	Team Penske	Ford	2:15.587	107.479
Full first practice results

=== Final practice ===
The final 55-minute practice session was held on Saturday, August 26, at 3:00 PM CST. James Davison, driving for Joe Gibbs Racing, would set the fastest time in the session, with a lap of 2:14.076 and an average speed of 108.691 mph (174.921 km/h).

Pos	#	Driver	Team	Make	Time	Speed
1	20	James Davison	Joe Gibbs Racing	Toyota	2:14.076	108.691
2	42	Justin Marks	Chip Ganassi Racing	Chevrolet	2:14.171	108.614
3	22	Austin Cindric (i)	Team Penske	Ford	2:14.433	108.402
Full final practice results

== Qualifying ==
Qualifying was scheduled to be held on Sunday, August 27, at 10:45 AM EST, but was cancelled due to inclement weather. The starting lineup would be based on a competition-based formula. As a result, Austin Cindric, driving for Team Penske, would earn the pole for the race.

No one would fail to qualify for the race.

=== Full starting lineup ===
Pos	#	Driver	Team	Make
1	22	Austin Cindric (i)	Team Penske	Ford
2	20	James Davison	Joe Gibbs Racing	Toyota
3	1	Elliott Sadler	JR Motorsports	Chevrolet
4	18	Christopher Bell (i)	Joe Gibbs Racing	Toyota
5	42	Justin Marks	Chip Ganassi Racing	Chevrolet
6	9	William Byron (R)	JR Motorsports	Chevrolet
7	7	Justin Allgaier	JR Motorsports	Chevrolet
8	2	Ben Kennedy (R)	Richard Childress Racing	Chevrolet
9	3	Scott Lagasse Jr.	Richard Childress Racing	Chevrolet
10	48	Brennan Poole	Chip Ganassi Racing	Chevrolet
11	21	Daniel Hemric (R)	Richard Childress Racing	Chevrolet
12	00	Cole Custer (R)	Stewart–Haas Racing	Ford
13	19	Matt Tifft (R)	Joe Gibbs Racing	Toyota
14	16	Ryan Reed	Roush Fenway Racing	Ford
15	11	Blake Koch	Kaulig Racing	Chevrolet
16	28	Dakoda Armstrong	JGL Racing	Toyota
17	5	Michael Annett	JR Motorsports	Chevrolet
18	62	Brendan Gaughan	Richard Childress Racing	Chevrolet
19	4	Ross Chastain	JD Motorsports	Chevrolet
20	14	J. J. Yeley	TriStar Motorsports	Toyota
21	39	Ryan Sieg	RSS Racing	Chevrolet
22	33	Brandon Jones	Richard Childress Racing	Chevrolet
23	24	Dylan Lupton	JGL Racing	Toyota
24	51	Jeremy Clements	Jeremy Clements Racing	Chevrolet
25	52	Joey Gase	Jimmy Means Racing	Chevrolet
26	23	Spencer Gallagher (R)	GMS Racing	Chevrolet
27	07	Ryan Ellis	SS-Green Light Racing	Chevrolet
28	98	Casey Mears	Biagi-DenBeste Racing	Ford
29	0	Garrett Smithley	JD Motorsports	Chevrolet
30	99	David Starr	BJMM with SS-Green Light Racing	Chevrolet
31	93	Jeff Green	RSS Racing	Chevrolet
32	01	Sheldon Creed	JD Motorsports	Chevrolet
33	8	Josh Bilicki	B. J. McLeod Motorsports	Chevrolet
34	40	Tim Cowen	MBM Motorsports	Dodge
35	90	Dexter Bean	DGM Racing	Chevrolet
36	78	Stephen Young	B. J. McLeod Motorsports	Chevrolet
37	74	John Graham	Mike Harmon Racing	Chevrolet
38	13	Ernie Francis Jr.	MBM Motorsports	Toyota
39	46	Parker Kligerman (i)	Precision Performance Motorsports	Chevrolet
40	17	Nicolas Hammann	Rick Ware Racing	Dodge
Official qualifying results
Official starting lineup

== Race results ==
Stage 1 Laps: 10

Pos	#	Driver	Team	Make	Pts
1	20	James Davison	Joe Gibbs Racing	Toyota	10
2	42	Justin Marks	Chip Ganassi Racing	Chevrolet	9
3	22	Austin Cindric (i)	Team Penske	Ford	0
4	48	Brennan Poole	Chip Ganassi Racing	Chevrolet	7
5	7	Justin Allgaier	JR Motorsports	Chevrolet	6
6	16	Ryan Reed	Roush Fenway Racing	Ford	5
7	19	Matt Tifft (R)	Joe Gibbs Racing	Toyota	4
8	9	William Byron (R)	JR Motorsports	Chevrolet	3
9	18	Christopher Bell (i)	Joe Gibbs Racing	Toyota	0
10	01	Sheldon Creed	JD Motorsports	Chevrolet	1

Stage 2 Laps: 10

Pos	#	Driver	Team	Make	Pts
1	21	Daniel Hemric (R)	Richard Childress Racing	Chevrolet	10
2	2	Ben Kennedy (R)	Richard Childress Racing	Chevrolet	9
3	1	Elliott Sadler	JR Motorsports	Chevrolet	8
4	7	Justin Allgaier	JR Motorsports	Chevrolet	7
5	14	J. J. Yeley	TriStar Motorsports	Toyota	6
6	19	Matt Tifft (R)	Joe Gibbs Racing	Toyota	5
7	51	Jeremy Clements	Jeremy Clements Racing	Chevrolet	4
8	62	Brendan Gaughan	Richard Childress Racing	Chevrolet	3
9	98	Casey Mears	Biagi-DenBeste Racing	Ford	2
10	11	Blake Koch	Kaulig Racing	Chevrolet	1

Stage 3 Laps: 25

Pos	#	Driver	Team	Make	Laps	Led	Status	Pts
1	51	Jeremy Clements	Jeremy Clements Racing	Chevrolet	45	10	Running	44
2	5	Michael Annett	JR Motorsports	Chevrolet	45	2	Running	35
3	19	Matt Tifft (R)	Joe Gibbs Racing	Toyota	45	6	Running	43
4	42	Justin Marks	Chip Ganassi Racing	Chevrolet	45	0	Running	42
5	62	Brendan Gaughan	Richard Childress Racing	Chevrolet	45	0	Running	35
6	9	William Byron (R)	JR Motorsports	Chevrolet	45	0	Running	34
7	11	Blake Koch	Kaulig Racing	Chevrolet	45	0	Running	31
8	00	Cole Custer (R)	Stewart–Haas Racing	Ford	45	0	Running	29
9	98	Casey Mears	Biagi–DenBeste Racing	Ford	45	0	Running	30
10	46	Parker Kligerman (i)	Precision Performance Motorsports	Chevrolet	45	0	Running	0
11	7	Justin Allgaier	JR Motorsports	Chevrolet	45	0	Running	39
12	8	Josh Bilicki	B. J. McLeod Motorsports	Chevrolet	45	0	Running	25
13	4	Ross Chastain	JD Motorsports	Chevrolet	45	0	Running	24
14	1	Elliott Sadler	JR Motorsports	Chevrolet	45	4	Running	31
15	21	Daniel Hemric (R)	Richard Childress Racing	Chevrolet	45	10	Running	32
16	22	Austin Cindric (i)	Team Penske	Ford	45	1	Running	0
17	14	J. J. Yeley	TriStar Motorsports	Toyota	45	0	Running	26
18	2	Ben Kennedy (R)	Richard Childress Racing	Chevrolet	45	0	Running	28
19	18	Christopher Bell (i)	Joe Gibbs Racing	Toyota	45	0	Running	0
20	39	Ryan Sieg	RSS Racing	Chevrolet	45	0	Running	17
21	07	Ryan Ellis	SS-Green Light Racing	Chevrolet	45	0	Running	16
22	28	Dakoda Armstrong	JGL Racing	Toyota	45	0	Running	15
23	3	Scott Lagasse Jr.	Richard Childress Racing	Chevrolet	45	0	Running	14
24	23	Spencer Gallagher (R)	GMS Racing	Chevrolet	45	0	Running	13
25	33	Brandon Jones	Richard Childress Racing	Chevrolet	45	0	Running	12
26	90	Dexter Bean	DGM Racing	Chevrolet	45	0	Running	11
27	0	Garrett Smithley	JD Motorsports	Chevrolet	45	0	Running	10
28	99	David Starr	BJMM with SS-Green Light Racing	Chevrolet	45	0	Running	9
29	17	Nicolas Hammann	Rick Ware Racing	Dodge	44	0	Running	8
30	74	John Graham	Mike Harmon Racing	Chevrolet	44	0	Running	7
31	48	Brennan Poole	Chip Ganassi Racing	Chevrolet	44	1	Running	13
32	52	Joey Gase	Jimmy Means Racing	Chevrolet	43	0	Running	5
33	24	Dylan Lupton	JGL Racing	Toyota	42	0	Running	4
34	78	Stephen Young	B. J. McLeod Motorsports	Chevrolet	42	0	Running	3
35	16	Ryan Reed	Roush Fenway Racing	Ford	36	0	Accident	7
36	40	Tim Cowen	MBM Motorsports	Dodge	35	0	Accident	1
37	20	James Davison	Joe Gibbs Racing	Toyota	20	11	Accident	11
38	01	Sheldon Creed	JD Motorsports	Chevrolet	18	0	Vibration	2
39	13	Ernie Francis Jr.	MBM Motorsports	Toyota	16	0	Engine	1
40	93	Jeff Green	RSS Racing	Chevrolet	2	0	Vibration	1
Official race results

== Standings after the race ==
Drivers' Championship standings

Pos	Driver	Points
1	Elliott Sadler	838
2	William Byron	731 (-107)
3	Justin Allgaier	710 (–128)
4	Brennan Poole	634 (–204)
5	Daniel Hemric	633 (–205)
6	Cole Custer	562 (-276)
7	Matt Tifft	557 (-281)
8	Blake Koch	485 (-353)
9	Michael Annett	470 (-353)
10	Ryan Reed	465 (-368)
11	Brendan Gaughan	463 (-375)
12	Dakoda Armstrong	459 (-379)
Official driver's standings

- Note: Only the first 12 positions are included for the driver standings.

Previous race: 2017 Food City 300	NASCAR Xfinity Series; 2017 season	Next race: 2017 Sport Clips Haircuts VFW 200
