= RFK Racing in the NASCAR Xfinity Series =

Roush Fenway Racing's Xfinity Series operation began in 1992 with the No. 60 driven by Mark Martin. The No. 60 team has been dominant throughout its history, amassing many wins with Martin; three driver's championships with Greg Biffle in 2002, Carl Edwards in 2007, and Chris Buescher in 2015; and an owner's championship with Edwards in 2011. The No. 6 team won back-to-back driver's championships in 2011 & 2012 with Ricky Stenhouse Jr. Following the departures of Ryan Reed, Chase Briscoe, and Austin Cindric, Roush's Xfinity program was closed following the 2018 season.

== Cars ==
=== Car No. 06 history ===
Todd Kluever (2006)

The number 06 Ford Fusion was first raced in the Hershey's Kissables 300 at Daytona International Speedway on February 18, 2006. Todd Kluever piloted the car, with sponsorship from 3M, for the entire 2006 season, earning four Top 10 finishes and one pole. Mike Kelley, the former car chief on championship car 97, was the crew chief.

Part Time with Mark Martin (2007)

For 2007, Mark Martin drove the 06 machine in two races, with sponsorship from Dish Network, at Daytona International Speedway and Texas Motor Speedway. This team did not return in 2008.

==== Car No. 06 results ====
Year	Driver	No.	Make	1	2	3	4	5	6	7	8	9	10	11	12	13	14	15	16	17	18	19	20	21	22	23	24	25	26	27	28	29	30	31	32	33	34	35	Owners	Pts
2006	Todd Kluever	06	Ford	DAY; 7	CAL; 12	MXC; 32	LVS; 21	ATL; 18	BRI; 34	TEX; 21	NSH; 32	PHO; 42	TAL; 27	RCH; 22	DAR; 32	CLT; 9	DOV; 18	NSH; 17	KEN; 17	MLW; 23	DAY; 25	CHI; 18	NHA; 13	MAR; 30	GTY; 13	IRP; 24	GLN; 38	MCH; 37	BRI; 39	CAL; 27	RCH; 36	DOV; 13	KAN; 37	CLT; 18	MEM; 16	TEX; 10	PHO; 18	HOM; 9	26th	3304
2007	Mark Martin	06	Ford	DAY; 5	CAL	MXC	LVS	ATL	BRI	NSH	TEX; 12	PHO	TAL	RCH	DAR	CLT	DOV	NSH	KEN	MLW	NHA	DAY	CHI	GTY	IRP	CGV	GLN	MCH	BRI	CAL	RCH	DOV	KAN	CLT	MEM	TEX	PHO	HOM	61st	282

=== Car No. 1 history ===
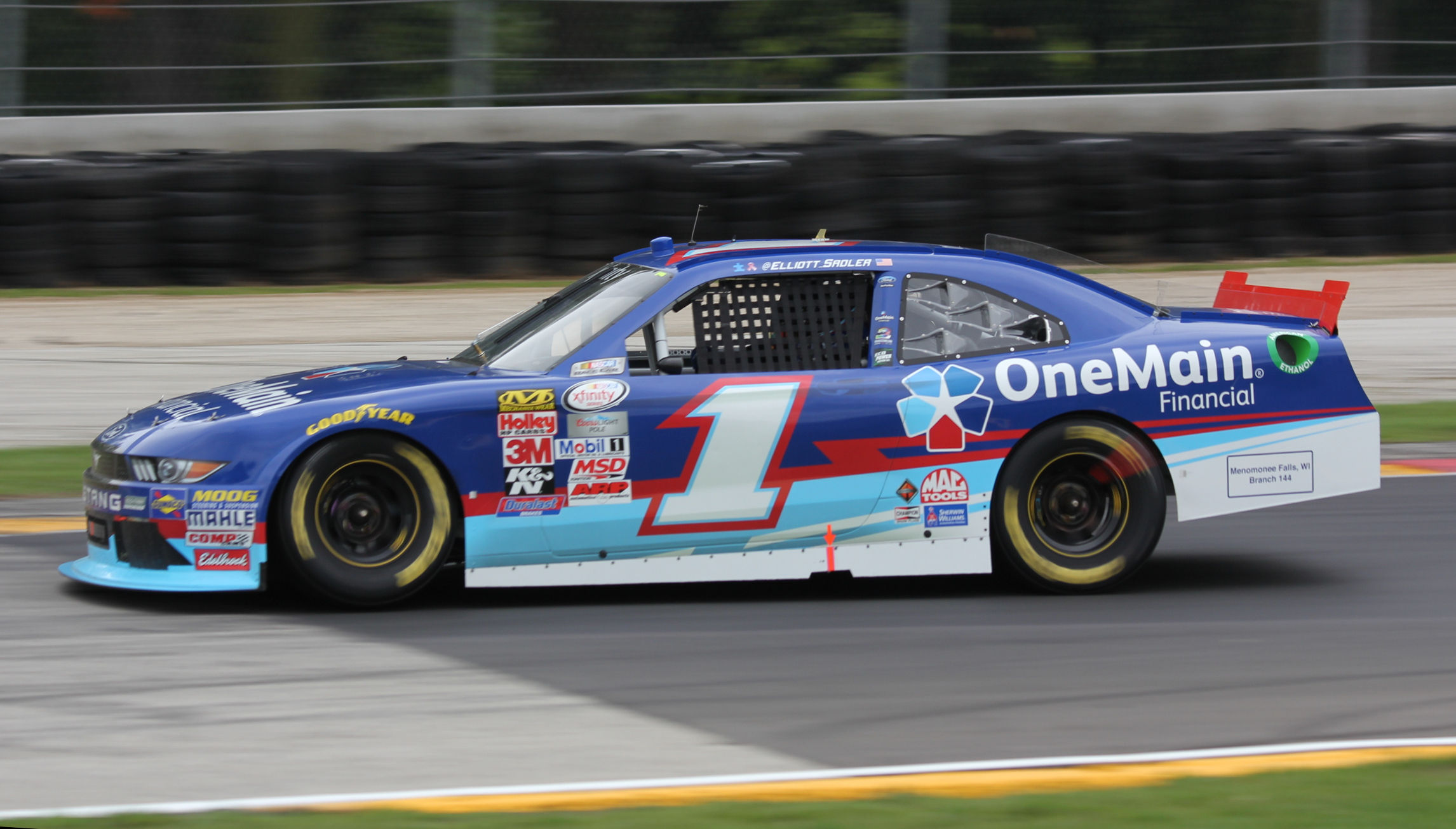
Elliott Sadler at Road America in 2015

On October 30, 2014, Roush Fenway announced that veteran Elliott Sadler would drive the No. 1 car in 2015, bringing sponsor OneMain Financial from Joe Gibbs Racing. This marked Sadler's reunion with former owner and engine builder Doug Yates, and his fourth stint with manufacturer Ford. Sadler earned four top fives and 17 top tens to finish sixth in points. Sadler and OneMain Financial would leave at the end of the season for JR Motorsports. The No. 1 team was shut down, and around 25 employees were released.

==== Car No. 1 results ====
Year	Driver	No.	Make	1	2	3	4	5	6	7	8	9	10	11	12	13	14	15	16	17	18	19	20	21	22	23	24	25	26	27	28	29	30	31	32	33	Owners	Pts
2015	Elliott Sadler	1	Ford	DAY; 19	ATL; 18	LVS; 13	PHO; 12	CAL; 10	TEX; 11	BRI; 10	RCH; 16	TAL; 7	IOW; 8	CLT; 9	DOV; 21	MCH; 5	CHI; 11	DAY; 2	KEN; 5	NHA; 17	IND; 5	IOW; 8	GLN; 8	MOH; 6	BRI; 31	ROA; 12	DAR; 11	RCH; 24	CHI; 8	KEN; 11	DOV; 9	CLT; 10	KAN; 12	TEX; 10	PHO; 9	HOM; 13	10th	1075

=== Car No. 6 & 9 history ===
==== As the 9 (1997-2005) ====
Multiple drivers (1997-2004)

The No. 9 car debuted at Daytona in 1997. Jeff Burton drove the Track Gear-sponsored Ford Taurus to a 40th-place finish. During the 1997 season, Robbie Crouch, Ted Musgrave, and Rob Wilson drove the No. 9 on limited schedules, with Burton winning twice at Bristol and Darlington. In 1998, Ashton Lewis and Chad Little both drove the 9 car for 1 race. From 1997-2003 Burton garnered 16 wins with additional sponsorships from Northern Light, Febreze, and Gain, among others. Greg Biffle also made 1 start in 2003 at the then called Lowe's Motor Speedway, earning a 12th place finish. Mark Martin returned to the Busch Series in 2004 posting four top-10s in five starts. The same year, Jeff Burton left Roush for greener pastures. Matt Kenseth ran 3 races in 2004 as well, getting a best finish of 3rd at Darlington. In 2005, Martin ran seven races and won twice. Kenseth also ran 2 races, getting a best finish of 6th.

==== As the 6 (2006-2017) ====
Part-time (2006)

The car switched to the No. 6 in 2006, after a number switch with Evernham Motorsports, and ran a part-time schedule sponsored by Ameriquest and Pennzoil. Martin ran seven races and while not winning, he got five Top 5 finishes. David Ragan also ran one race that year, finishing 36th at Lowe's Motor Speedway.

David Ragan (2007-2008)

In 2007, David Ragan drove the car full-time in 2007 using the No. 06 owner's points, with a sponsorship from the Discount Tire. Ragan posted four Top 5's and nine Top 10's and a fifth-place finish in points. Ragan was named 2007 Rookie of the Year. In 2008, Ragan had a massive improvement; while he still did not win, he earned seven Top 5's and 21 Top 10's and finished fourth in the standings.

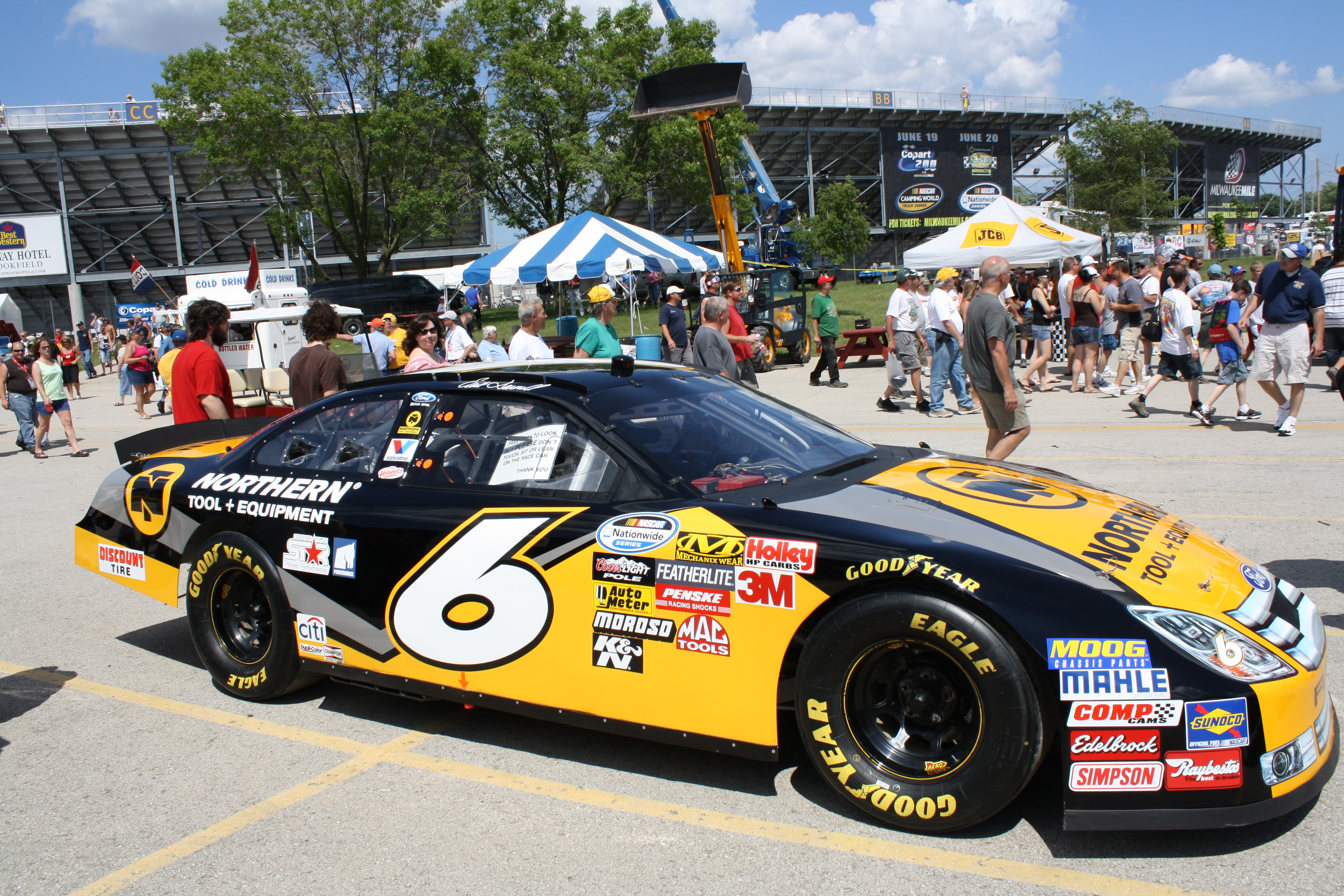
Erik Darnell at Milwaukee in 2009.

Part-time (2009)

Ragan went to part-time and ran 19 races with Discount Tire sponsoring. Ragan won the 2009 Aaron's 312 for his first Nationwide series victory as well as a win at Bristol. Rookie Erik Darnell ran the rest of the schedule with Northern Tool and Equipment sponsoring. He won a pole and had two Top 5’s and five Top 10's; however, he was unable to return the next season due to a lack of funding.

Ricky Stenhouse Jr. (2010-2012)

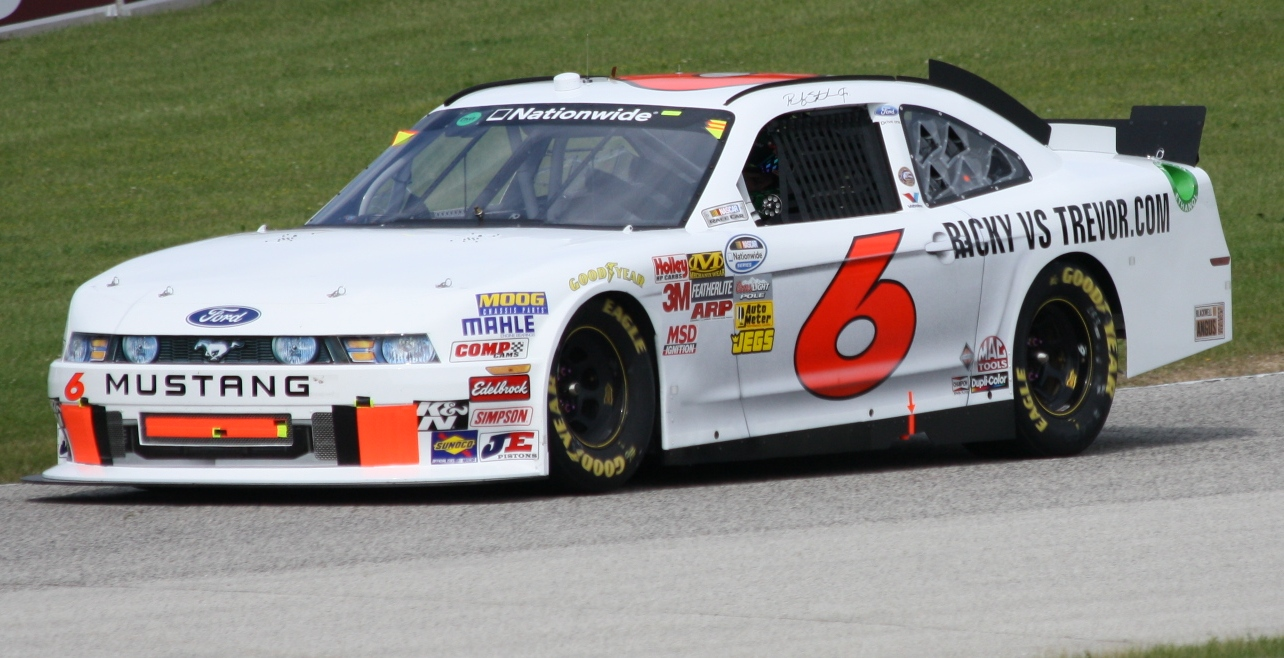
Ricky Stenhouse Jr. in 2011.

In 2010, Ricky Stenhouse Jr. drove the No. 6 Ford with Citigroup as the primary sponsor. After crashing out of a few early events along with rookie teammate Colin Braun, Roush temporarily benched Stenhouse after he failed to qualify at Nashville in April. The No. 6 was driven by Brian Ickler at Kentucky, and by Billy Johnson at Watkins Glen. When veteran Mike Kelley took over the pit box, Stenhouse responded with a third-place finish at the fall race at Daytona. In the end, Stenhouse got three Top 5's and eight Top 10's and a points finish of 16th. The team also won Rookie of the Year honors. The next year Cargill Meat Solutions sponsored the team for a few races as Citi had left for Kevin Harvick Incorporated. With fresh momentum, and most of the Cup drivers running limited schedules, Stenhouse swept both Iowa races for his first two Nationwide Series victories, and held off former Cup driver Elliott Sadler for the Nationwide Series championship. In the end, Stenhouse had a massive improvement from 2010, getting two wins, 16 Top 5's, and 26 Top 10's and won the 2011 NASCAR Nationwide Series championship. In 2012, Stenhouse would get six wins, 19 Top 5's, and 26 Top 10's and beat Sadler again in 2012 for his second consecutive championship.

Trevor Bayne (2013-2014)

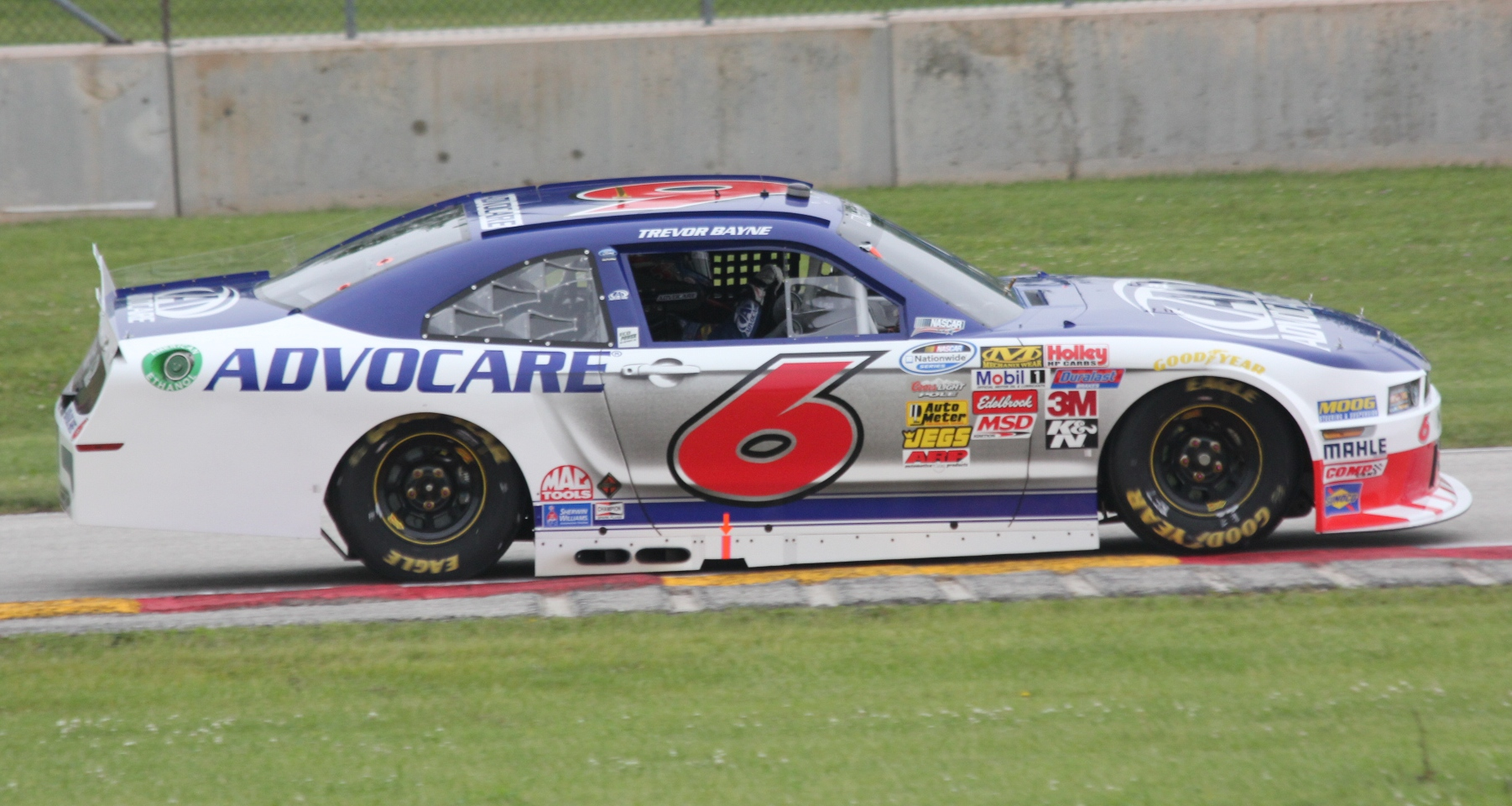
Trevor Bayne in 2014.

For 2013, former Daytona 500 winner Trevor Bayne, who had been sidelined in recent years due to illness and lack of sponsorship, drove the car full-time. Cargill returned to the team, along with Valvoline and Ford EcoBoost. He earned seven Top 5's and 21 Top 10's, finished sixth in the standings and won once at Iowa. In 2014, AdvoCare moved from Richard Childress Racing to sponsor the entire season. While not winning, Bayne earned a pole at Iowa, along with seven Top 5's and 21 Top 10's to finish 6th in point standings. Bayne moved up to the Sprint Cup Series in 2015 with Advocare.

Bubba Wallace (2015-2017)

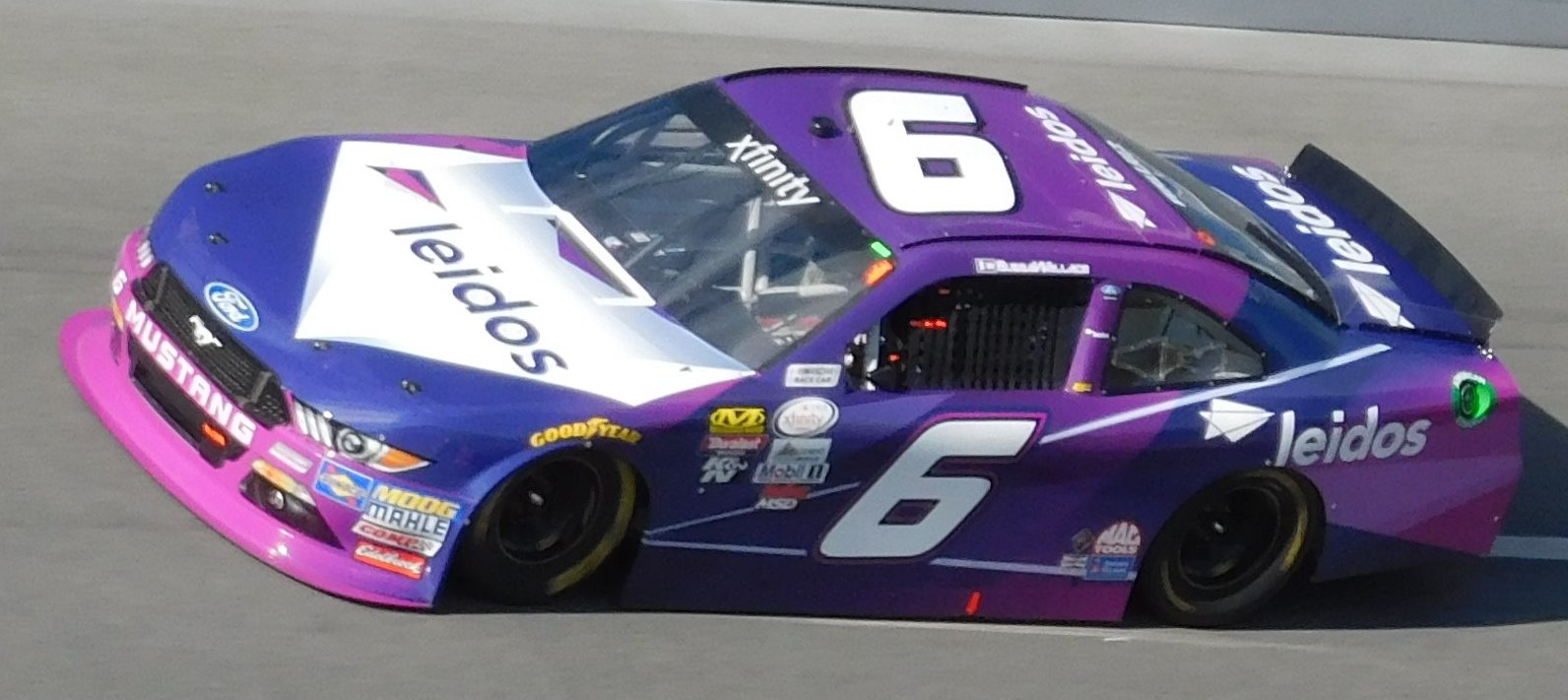
Bubba Wallace in 2017.

In December 2014, it was reported that Truck Series driver and Drive for Diversity graduate Bubba Wallace had asked for and was granted release from his contract with Joe Gibbs Racing. Later, it was revealed that he had signed a deal to drive in Roush Fenway's No. 6 for 2015, with Chad Norris as his crew chief. Due to lack of sponsorship, Ford EcoBoost and Roush Performance frequently appeared as placeholders on the car, as the brands had done on teammate Chris Buescher's No. 60 car. One-race deals came from Cheez-It, AdvoCare, Fastenal, Bleacher Report, Cross Insurance, and Scotchman. Wallace, in his rookie year got three Top 5's and 14 Top 10's, and finished seventh in the standings. In 2016, Wallace got three Top 5's and nine Top 10's and finished 11th in the points standings. In 2017, the team ran for the first half of the season before shutting down operations due to a lack of sponsorship. Wallace departed the team to drive the No. 43 for Richard Petty Motorsports in the Cup Series.

Conor Daly (2018)

for the 2018 season, The No. 6 team ran only one race at Road America race with IndyCar Series driver Conor Daly. Daly was supposed to have Lilly Diabetes sponsor him, but Lilly Diabetes pulled their sponsorship last minute, Jack Roush was forced to pay for the sponsorship himself for the race. Daly finished 31st after a suspension issue late in the race.

==== Car No. 6 results ====
Year	Driver	No.	Make	1	2	3	4	5	6	7	8	9	10	11	12	13	14	15	16	17	18	19	20	21	22	23	24	25	26	27	28	29	30	31	32	33	34	35	Owners	Pts
1997	Jeff Burton	9	Ford	DAY; 40	CAR	RCH; 6*	ATL; 14	LVS	DAR; 2	HCY	TEX; 3	BRI; 1*	NSV				CLT; 13	DOV; 2	SBO	GLN	MLW	MYB	GTY	IRP	MCH; 4	BRI	DAR; 1*	RCH; 3*	DOV	CLT; 4	CAL	CAR; 4*	HOM						26th	1948
1997	Ted Musgrave	9	Ford											TAL; 36																									26th	1948
1997	Robbie Crouch	9	Ford												NHA; 42	NZH																							26th	1948
1998	Jeff Burton	9	Ford	DAY; 22	CAR; 4*	LVS; 4	NSV	DAR; 2*	BRI; 39	TEX; 10	HCY	TAL	NHA	NZH	CLT; 22	DOV	RCH; 1	PPR							MCH; 1*	BRI		RCH; 2	DOV	CLT; 6	GTY	CAR; 13	ATL	HOM; 1					30th	1883
1998	Ashton Lewis	9	Ford																GLN; 3	MLW	MYB	CAL	SBO	IRP															30th	1883
1998	Chad Little	9	Ford																								DAR; 30												30th	1883
1999	Jeff Burton	9	Ford	DAY; 9	CAR; 1	LVS; 3	ATL	DAR; 6	TEX; 2	NSV	BRI	TAL	CAL; 2	NHA	RCH; 2	NZH	CLT; 4	DOV	SBO	GLN	MLW	MYB	PPR	GTY	IRP	MCH; 7	BRI	DAR; 7	RCH; 35	DOV	CLT; 14	CAR	MEM	PHO; 4	HOM; 8				25th	2091
2000	Jeff Burton	9	Ford	DAY	CAR; 5	LVS; 1*	ATL	DAR; 3*	BRI	TEX; 6	NSV	TAL	CAL; 2	RCH; 41	NHA	CLT; 1*	DOV	SBO	MYB	GLN	MLW	NZH	PPR	GTY	IRP	MCH; 3	BRI	DAR; 2*	RCH; 1*	DOV	CLT; 10	CAR; 2*	MEM	PHO; 1*	HOM; 5				29th	2259
2001	Jeff Burton	9	Ford	DAY	CAR	LVS; 6	ATL	DAR	BRI	TEX; 2	NSH	TAL	CAL	RCH	NHA	NZH	CLT; 7	DOV	KEN	MLW	GLN	CHI; 3	GTY	PPR	IRP	MCH; 10	BRI	DAR; 1*	RCH; 9	DOV	KAN; 31	CLT; 3	MEM	PHO; 9	CAR	HOM; 13			33rd	1600
2002	Jeff Burton	9	Ford	DAY	CAR	LVS; 1*	DAR; 1*	BRI	TEX; 10	NSH	TAL	CAL; 15	RCH	NHA; 41	NZH	CLT; 30	DOV	NSH	KEN	MLW	DAY	CHI; 3*	GTY	PPR	IRP	MCH; 2	BRI	DAR; 1	RCH; 3	DOV	KAN; 1	CLT; 1*	MEM	ATL	CAR	PHO; 17	HOM		37th	1755
2003	Jeff Burton	9	Ford	DAY	CAR	LVS; 35	DAR	BRI	TEX	TAL	NSH	CAL	RCH	GTY	NZH								NHA; 16	PPR	IRP	MCH; 20	BRI	DAR	RCH	DOV	KAN	CLT	MEM	ATL	PHO	CAR	HOM		56th	409
2003	Greg Biffle	9	Ford													CLT; 12	DOV	NSH	KEN	MLW	DAY	CHI																	56th	409
2004	Mark Martin	9	Ford	DAY; DNQ	CAR																					MCH; 2	BRI	CAL	RCH; 12	DOV; 8				ATL; 6	PHO; 6				37th	1601
2004	Matt Kenseth	9	Ford			LVS; 6																									KAN; 33	CLT	MEM			DAR; 5	HOM		37th	1601
2004	Jeff Burton	9	Ford				DAR; 2	BRI	TEX; 9	NSH	TAL	CAL; 16	GTY	RCH	NZH	CLT	DOV	NSH	KEN	MLW	DAY	CHI; 3	NHA	PPR	IRP														37th	1601
2005	Mark Martin	9	Ford	DAY	CAL; 1^{*}	MXC	LVS; 1	ATL	NSH	BRI	TEX; 31	PHO	TAL	DAR	RCH; 7	CLT	DOV	NSH	KEN	MLW	DAY	CHI; 5	NHA	PPR	GTY	IRP	GLN	MCH	BRI	CAL	RCH; 4	DOV	KAN; 14					HOM; 3	44th	1450
2005	Matt Kenseth	9	Ford																															CLT; 25	MEM	TEX; 6	PHO		44th	1450
2006	Mark Martin	6	Ford	DAY	CAL	MXC	LVS	ATL	BRI	TEX; 24	NSH	PHO; 5	TAL	RCH	DAR; 4	CLT; 32	DOV	NSH	KEN	MLW	DAY	CHI	NHA	MAR	GTY	IRP	GLN	MCH; 5	BRI	CAL; 3^{*}	RCH	DOV	KAN			TEX; 4	PHO	HOM	47th	1028
2006	David Ragan	6	Ford																															CLT; 36	MEM				47th	1028
2007	David Ragan	6	Ford	DAY; 43	CAL; 18	MXC; 14	LVS; 24	ATL; 20	BRI; 13	NSH; 36	TEX; 5	PHO; 35	TAL; 4	RCH; 14	DAR; 13	CLT; 25	DOV; 32	NSH; 7	KEN; 8	MLW; 12	NHA; 18	DAY; 34	CHI; 19	GTY; 5	IRP; 18	CGV; 19	GLN; 21	MCH; 21	BRI; 6	CAL; 10	RCH; 39	DOV; 32	KAN; 34	CLT; 6	MEM; 3	TEX; 17	PHO; 23	HOM; 33	12th	3739
2008	David Ragan	6	Ford	DAY; 9	CAL; 12	LVS; 10	ATL; 16	BRI; 8	NSH; 21	TEX; 8	PHO; 5	MXC; 22	TAL; 18	RCH; 4	DAR; 27	CLT; 9	DOV; 29	NSH; 5	KEN; 7	MLW; 4	NHA; 6	DAY; 9	CHI; 13	GTY; 10	IRP; 9	CGV; 13	GLN; 9	MCH; 36	BRI; 25	CAL; 9	RCH; 5	DOV; 9	KAN; 3	CLT; 12	MEM; 8	TEX; 5	PHO; 14	HOM; 23	6th	4525
2009	David Ragan	6	Ford	DAY; 8	CAL; 5	LVS; 26	BRI; 19	TEX; 4	NSH; 7	PHO; 6	TAL; 1			CLT; 7	DOV; 30					DAY; 9	CHI; 34				GLN; 8	MCH; 4	BRI; 1		ATL; 9				CAL; 9			TEX; 8	PHO; 6		10th	4469
2009	Erik Darnell	6	Ford									RCH; 12	DAR; 4			NSH; 9	KEN; 11	MLW; 4	NHA; 9			GTY; 10	IRP; 29	IOW; 23				CGV; 12		RCH; 14	DOV; 17	KAN; 18		CLT; 34	MEM; 31			HOM; 31	10th	4469
2010	Ricky Stenhouse Jr.	6	Ford	DAY; 36	CAL; 39	LVS; 30	BRI; 25	NSH; 31	PHO; 9	TEX; 29	TAL; 29	RCH; 20	DAR; 37	DOV; 18	CLT; 40	NSH; DNQ		ROA; 26	NHA; 16	DAY; 3	CHI; 19	GTY; 9	IRP; 11	IOW; 14		MCH; 13	BRI; 22	CGV; 24	ATL; 10	RCH; 4	DOV; 11	KAN; 6	CAL; 29	CLT; 14	GTY; 23	TEX; 11	PHO; 9	HOM; 4	16th	3623
2010	Brian Ickler	6	Ford														KEN; 14																						16th	3623
2010	Billy Johnson	6	Ford																						GLN; 36														16th	3623
2011	Ricky Stenhouse Jr.	6	Ford	DAY; 8	PHO; 7	LVS; 8	BRI; 14	CAL; 4	TEX; 8	TAL; 38	NSH; 5	RCH; 21	DAR; 10	DOV; 4	IOW; 1	CLT; 4	CHI; 14	MCH; 2	ROA; 8	DAY; 27	KEN; 9	NHA; 4	NSH; 2	IRP; 3*	IOW; 1	GLN; 15	CGV; 26	BRI; 11	ATL; 3	RCH; 3	CHI; 8	DOV; 5	KAN; 5	CLT; 9	TEX; 6	PHO; 5	HOM; 2		3rd	1222
2012	Ricky Stenhouse Jr.	6	Ford	DAY; 19	PHO; 3	LVS; 1*	BRI; 6	CAL; 2	TEX; 1	RCH; 4	TAL; 3	DAR; 6	IOW; 1*	CLT; 26	DOV; 32	MCH; 25	ROA; 11	KEN; 8	DAY; 2	NHA; 5	CHI; 2*	IND; 9	IOW; 5	GLN; 4	CGV; 12	BRI; 2	ATL; 1	RCH; 2	CHI; 1	KEN; 17	DOV; 9	CLT; 7	KAN; 1	TEX; 4	PHO; 3	HOM; 6			2nd	1251
2013	Trevor Bayne	6	Ford	DAY; 31	PHO; 4	LVS; 4	BRI; 12	CAL; 9	TEX; 26	RCH; 12	TAL; 28	DAR; 32	CLT; 6	DOV; 4	IOW; 1	MCH; 5	ROA; 30	KEN; 12	DAY; 10	NHA; 7	CHI; 7	IND; 16	IOW; 10	GLN; 10	MOH; 9	BRI; 6	ATL; 6	RCH; 5	CHI; 15	KEN; 15	DOV; 9	KAN; 9	CLT; 8	TEX; 11	PHO; 7	HOM; 5			9th	1086
2014	Trevor Bayne	6	Ford	DAY; 3	PHO; 7	LVS; 8	BRI; 8	CAL; 9	TEX; 23	DAR; 9	RCH; 11	TAL; 10	IOW; 9	CLT; 8	DOV; 2	MCH; 30	ROA; 27	KEN; 15	DAY; 9	NHA; 9	CHI; 2	IND; 9	IOW; 3	GLN; 13	MOH; 9	BRI; 13	ATL; 12	RCH; 15	CHI; 5	KEN; 15	DOV; 9	KAN; 8	CLT; 7	TEX; 36	PHO; 9	HOM; 11			10th	1086
2015	Bubba Wallace	6	Ford	DAY; 12	ATL; 11	LVS; 7	PHO; 15	CAL; 12	TEX; 6	BRI; 12	RCH; 12	TAL; 20	IOW; 6	CLT; 5	DOV; 17	MCH; 15	CHI; 10	DAY; 34	KEN; 7	NHA; 8	IND; 23	IOW; 11	GLN; 16	MOH; 8	BRI; 12	ROA; 5	DAR; 14	RCH; 14	CHI; 3	KEN; 9	DOV; 11	CLT; 8	KAN; 11	TEX; 19	PHO; 8	HOM; 10			11th	1071
2016	Bubba Wallace	6	Ford	DAY; 6	ATL; 18	LVS; 33	PHO; 12	CAL; 3	TEX; 15	BRI; 25	RCH; 16	TAL; 13	DOV; 2	CLT; 27	POC; 16	MCH; 9	IOW; 9	DAY; 20	KEN; 5	NHA; 12	IND; 14	IOW; 27	GLN; 29	MOH; 15	BRI; 7	ROA; 9	DAR; 17	RCH; 12	CHI; 20	KEN; 8	DOV; 11	CLT; 20	KAN; 33	TEX; 11	PHO; 32	HOM; 11			14th	2163
2017	Bubba Wallace	6	Ford	DAY; 33	ATL; 6	LVS; 6	PHO; 6	CAL; 6	TEX; 6	BRI; 33	RCH; 6	TAL; 13	CLT; 28	DOV; 8	POC; 11	MCH	IOW	DAY	KEN	NHA	IND	IOW	GLN	MOH	BRI	ROA	DAR	RCH	CHI	KEN	DOV	CLT	KAN	TEX	PHO	HOM			25th	382
2018	Conor Daly	6	Ford	DAY	ATL	LVS	PHO	CAL	TEX	BRI	RCH	TAL	DOV	CLT	POC	MCH	IOW	CHI	DAY	KEN	NHA	IOW	GLN	MOH	BRI	ROA; 31	DAR	IND	LVS	RCH	CLT	DOV	KAN	TEX	PHO	HOM			52nd	6

=== Car No. 16 history ===
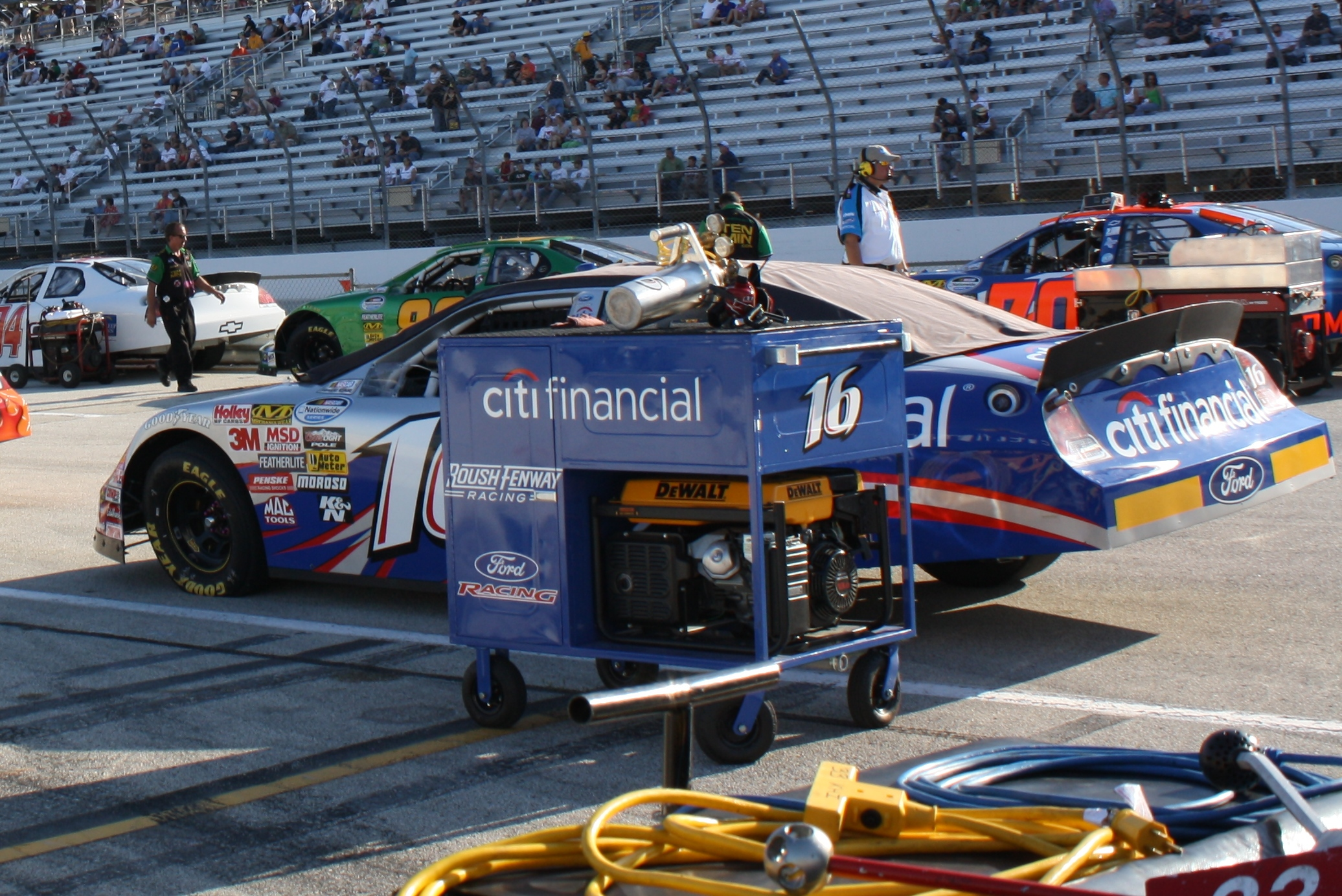
Ricky Stenhouse Jr. in 2009.

==== Multiple Drivers (2006-2009) ====
The No. 16 car made its Busch Series debut at Daytona in 2006. Greg Biffle drove the Ameriquest-sponsored car in 20 races, winning once at California Speedway and getting nine Top 5's and 18 Top 10's. For 2007, Biffle drove for 19 races in the No. 16, while driving another 12 in the 37 for Brewco Motorsports. Biffle only garnered three Top 5's and 13 Top 10's. Todd Kluever Drove the No. 16 in fourteen races, getting a best finish of eighth at Darlington Raceway. Travis Kvapil and Colin Braun both drove the 16 in one race that year, both got finishes of 21st and 31st.

In 2008, the No. 16 team, sponsored by Citigroup and 3M, went winless for the second year in a row, Greg Biffle drove the car for 15 races, while Jamie McMurray started three races, and Colin Braun drove for five races, getting a best finish of second at Indianapolis Motorsports Park. Braun also won two poles wins at Mexico City and O'Reilly Raceway Park. Biffle got four Top 5's and ten Top 10's, McMurray only got one Top 5 and Braun also earned one Top 5.

In 2009, the No. 16 saw Colin Braun, Matt Kenseth, Ricky Stenhouse Jr., and Greg Biffle make starts. Biffle started 14 races, getting four Top 5's and nine Top 10's, and finally won twice, winning at Las Vegas and Phoenix. Kenseth got six Top 5's and ten Top 10's and won once at Darlington. Stenhouse ran seven races, he won a pole at Iowa Speedway and got one Top 5 and two Top 10's. Colin Braun only ran one race at Circuit Gilles Villeneuve, he finished 40th after engine troubles.

==== Colin Braun (2010) ====
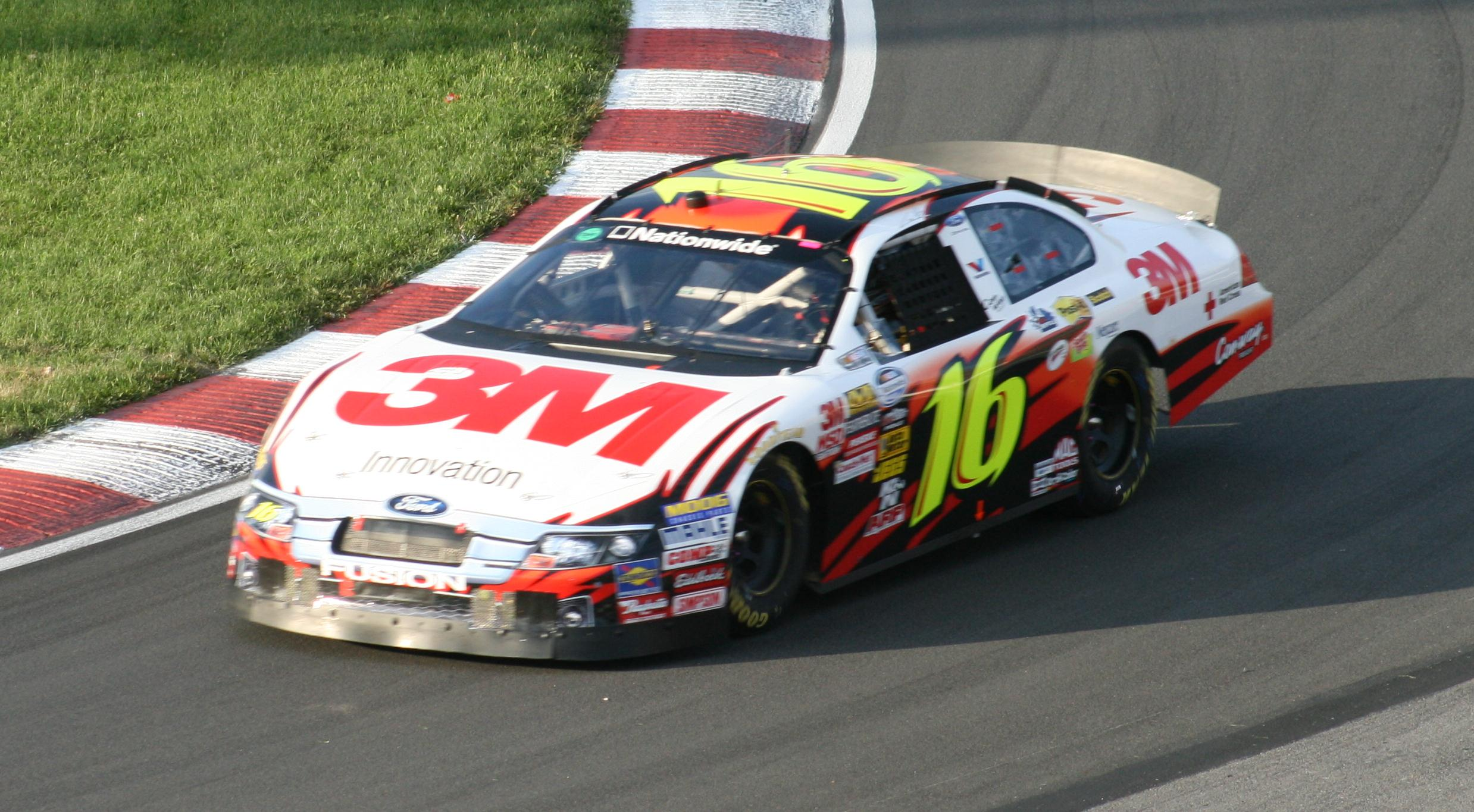
Colin Braun in 2010.

Colin Braun moved up to the ride full-time in 2010 with Con-way Freight as the sponsor for 18 races. Like his teammate Ricky Stenhouse Jr., Braun struggled, crashing out of several races. After 8 races, he was 25th in points and had 5 DNFs, because of this, Jack Roush benched him for 4 of the next 5 races. Braun was replaced by Matt Kenseth at Richmond and Darlington, and Brian Ickler drove at Charlotte and Nashville. Stenhouse was benched for 2 races that year, but he improved quite a bit, Braun didn't so much, because of this, he was benched for even more races. Matt Kenseth drove for another race at Atlanta, Brian Ickler did another 2 at Daytona and Bristol, and Erik Darnell drove 3 races at Richmond, Dover and Texas. Trevor Bayne also drove a single race at Gateway. Braun had only 5 Top 10's finishes in 24 starts, and was released after the end of the season.

==== Trevor Bayne (2011) ====
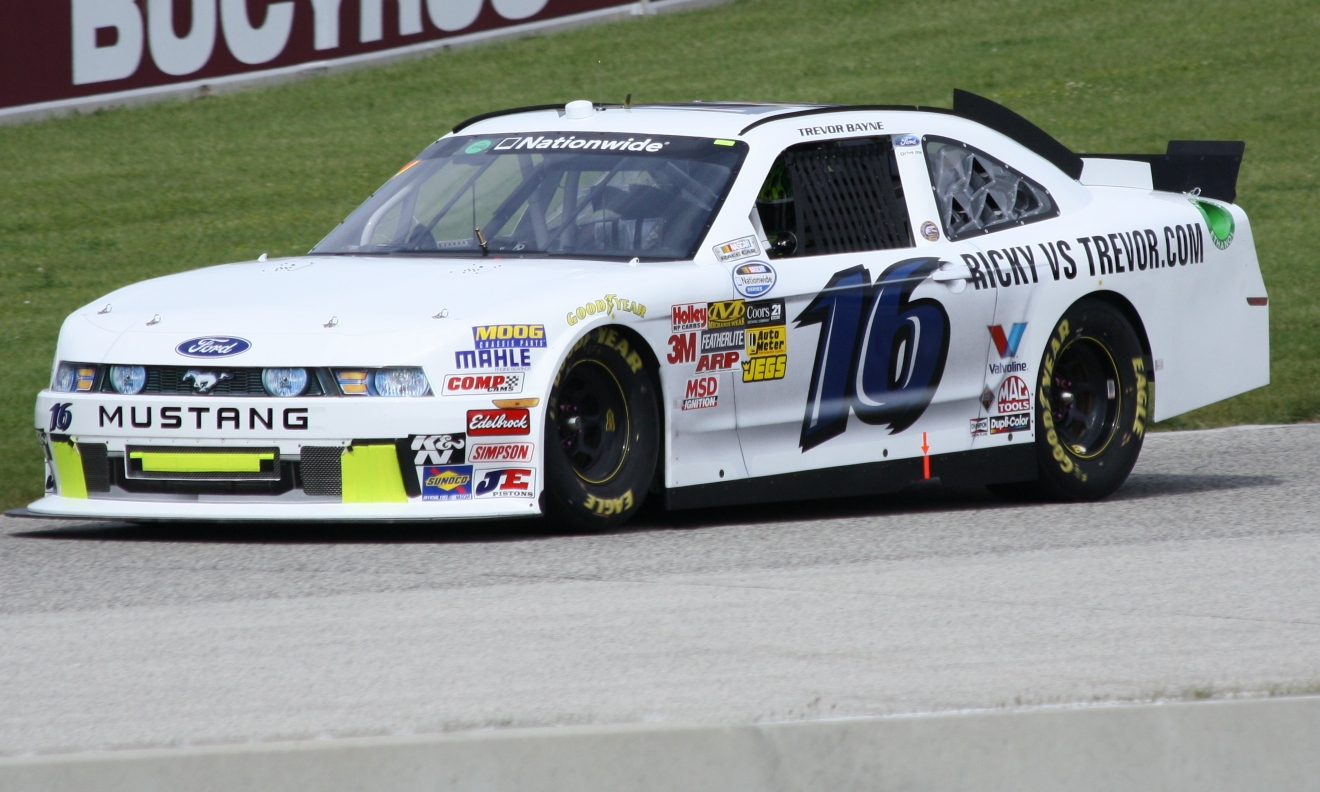
Trevor Bayne at Road America in 2011

In 2011, Colin Braun was replaced by Trevor Bayne. However, after 8 races, Bayne was hospitalized for various illnesses, and Roush development drivers Chris Buescher and Kevin Swindell filled in for him, Buescher ran at Richmond and Darlington, and Swindell ran at Dover, both finished outside the top 10. Matt Kenseth also filled in for 1 race at Charlotte, in which he led 41 laps en route to a win. Bayne returned later in the season, and scored his first win at Texas in the fall. Bayne in the end earned 1 win, 5 Top 5's, 14 Top 10's and finished 11th in the standings. Bayne's crew moved over to RFR's No. 60 to run a limited schedule, and the 16 team shut down for 2012.

==== Multiple Drivers (2013) ====
For 2013, the No. 16 car was brought back with Chris Buescher, Billy Johnson, Ryan Reed and Ricky Stenhouse Jr. Buescher ran 7 races, getting 2 Top 10's in the process. Johnson ran 2 races, getting 2 15th place finishes at Road America and Loudon. Ryan Reed ran 6 races and only got 1 top 10 at Richmond. Stenhouse only ran 1 race at Texas finishing 17th.

==== Ryan Reed (2014-2018) ====
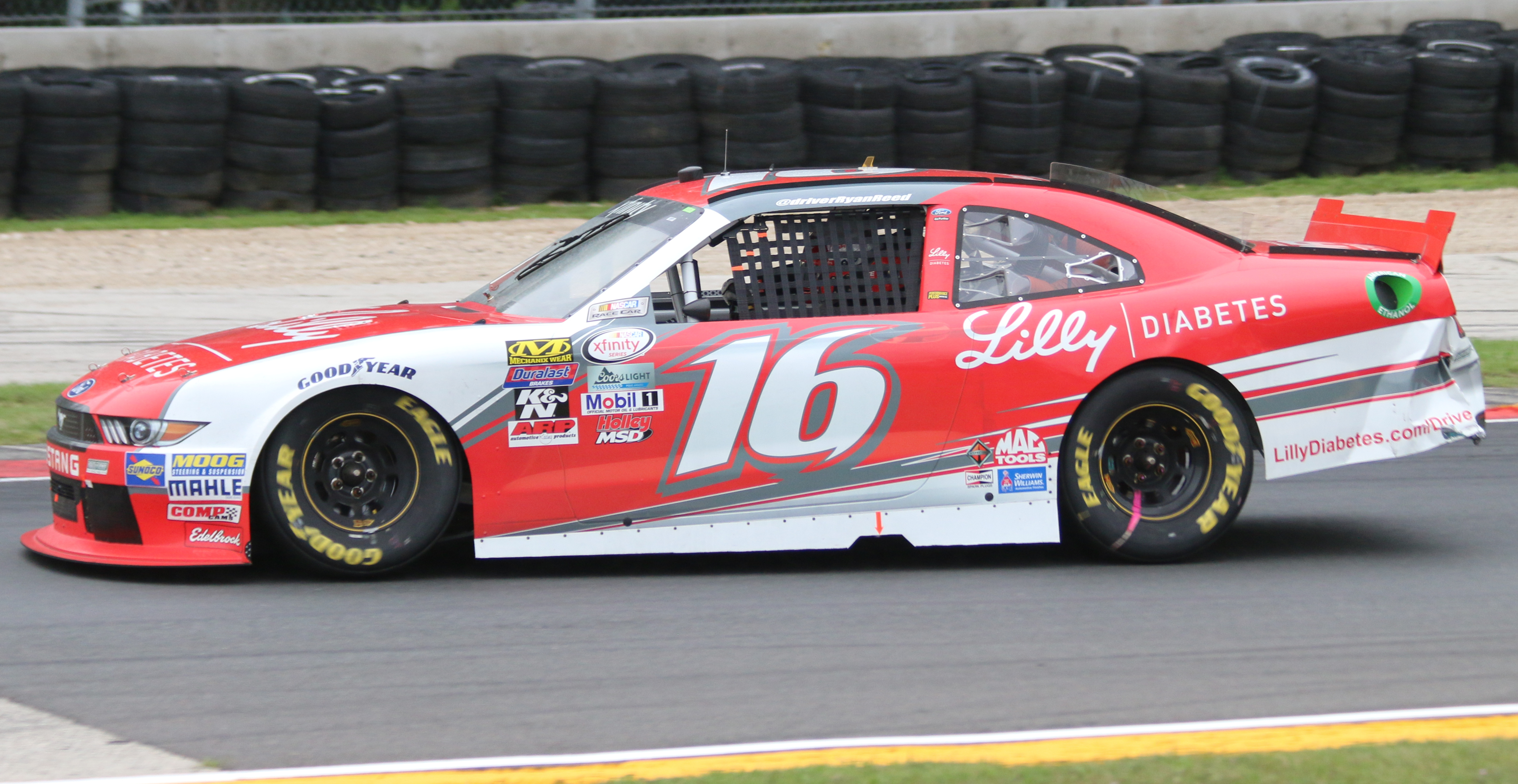
Reed's No. 16 at Road America in 2016

In 2014, Ryan Reed was picked to drive the No. 16 full-time with Lilly and the ADA, running for Rookie of the Year. Reed scored only 1 top 5 finish, a fourth at Daytona in July. Reed finishing ninth in driver points while the No. 16 finished 14th in owner points.

Reed returned to the No. 16 for 2015, and won the first race of the season at Daytona, which was also his first career win. Reed was pushed by teammate Buescher past leader Brad Keselowski on the final lap to take the victory. The win would be Reed's only Top 5 and 10 of the year; he would have an average finish of 16.8 to finish tenth in driver points.

In 2016 Reed went winless but improved, earning 1 Top 5, 7 Top 10's and finished 6th in points. Reed won the season opener at Daytona again in 2017, He also got 2 Top 5's, 7 Top 10's and finished 8th in points. In 2018, Reed failed to win a race but he improved his average finish from a 17.8 to a 16.0. he also got 2 Top 5's and 10 Top 10's. After 2018, Roush shut down their Xfinity operation, laying off Reed and other part time drivers and employees.

==== Car No. 16 results ====
Year	Driver	No.	Make	1	2	3	4	5	6	7	8	9	10	11	12	13	14	15	16	17	18	19	20	21	22	23	24	25	26	27	28	29	30	31	32	33	34	35	Owners	Pts
2006	Greg Biffle	16	Ford	DAY; 31	CAL; 1	MXC	LVS; 4	ATL; 3	BRI; 28	TEX; 2	NSH	PHO; 6	TAL; 6	RCH; 4	DAR; 5	CLT; 12	DOV; 8	NSH	KEN	MLW	DAY; 9	CHI; 24	NHA; 10	MAR	GTY	IRP; 4	GLN	MCH; 43	BRI; 37	CAL; 23	RCH; 2	DOV; 8	KAN; 8	CLT; 41	MEM	TEX; 23	PHO; 12	HOM; 38	28th	3215
2007	Todd Kluever	16	Ford	DAY; 14		MXC; 11		ATL; 33	BRI; 12	NSH; 13		PHO; 33			DAR; 8			NSH; 8	KEN; 23	MLW; 18	NHA; 17			GTY; 11		CGV; 21	GLN; 20												13th	3672
2007	Greg Biffle	16	Ford		CAL; 5		LVS; 38				TEX; 36		TAL; 30	RCH; 6		CLT; 21	DOV; 18					DAY; 37	CHI; 39		IRP; 2			MCH; 5		CAL; 32	RCH; 13	DOV; 9	KAN; 10	CLT; 30		TEX; 16	PHO; 36	HOM; 6	13th	3672
2007	Travis Kvapil	16	Ford																										BRI; 21										13th	3672
2007	Colin Braun	16	Ford																																MEM; 30				13th	3672
2008	Greg Biffle	16	Ford	DAY; 7	CAL	LVS; 2		BRI; 13					TAL; 11	RCH	DAR	CLT; 7	DOV; 5	NSH; 10	KEN		NHA; 19		CHI; 6	GTY		CGV; 8	GLN	MCH; 5	BRI; 3	CAL	RCH; 6	DOV	KAN; 18	CLT	MEM	TEX	PHO	HOM	26th	2846
2008	Jamie McMurray	16	Ford				ATL; 13			TEX; 5	PHO; 36																												26th	2846
2008	Colin Braun	16	Ford						NSH; 15			MXC; 33								MLW; 21		DAY; 35			IRP; 2														26th	2846
2009	Greg Biffle	16	Ford	DAY; 5	CAL; 34	LVS; 1*				PHO; 1*				CLT; 12	DOV; 25				NHA; 7		CHI; 7				GLN; 7	MCH; 8			ATL; 8	RCH; 12		KAN; 5	CAL; 14						9th	4496
2009	Matt Kenseth	16	Ford				BRI; 4	TEX; 6			TAL; 35	RCH; 3	DAR; 1							DAY; 14			IRP; 3				BRI; 5				DOV; 11			CLT; 33	MEM; 11	TEX; 4	PHO; 7	HOM; 10	9th	4496
2009	Ricky Stenhouse Jr.	16	Ford						NSH; 23							NSH; 32	KEN; 9	MLW; 5				GTY; 30	IRP; QL^{†}	IOW; 22											MEM; QL^{†}				9th	4496
2009	Colin Braun	16	Ford																									CGV; 40											9th	4496
2010	Colin Braun	16	Ford	DAY; 34	CAL; 18	LVS; 28	BRI; 37	NSH; 30	PHO; 34	TEX; 13	TAL; 32			DOV; 10			KEN; 10	ROA; 11	NHA; 12		CHI; 17	GTY; 7	IRP; 12	IOW; 23	GLN; 26	MCH; 9		CGV; 22				KAN; 23	CAL; 13	CLT; 19			PHO; 7	HOM; 29	13th	3743
2010	Matt Kenseth	16	Ford									RCH; 10	DAR; 30																ATL; 5										13th	3743
2010	Brian Ickler	16	Ford												CLT; 15	NSH; 29				DAY; 9							BRI; 19												13th	3743
2010	Erik Darnell	16	Ford																											RCH; 22	DOV; 14					TEX; 14			13th	3743
2010	Trevor Bayne	16	Ford																																GTY; 11				13th	3743
2011	Trevor Bayne	16	Ford	DAY; 10	PHO; 31	LVS; 5	BRI; 19	CAL; 6	TEX; 13	TAL; 6	NSH; 6						CHI; 3	MCH; 5	ROA; 31	DAY; 22	KEN; 11	NHA; 13	NSH; 9	IRP; 28	IOW; 25	GLN; 9	CGV; 23	BRI; 13	ATL; 33	RCH; 28	CHI; 11	DOV; 6	KAN; 9	CLT; 3	TEX; 1	PHO; 6	HOM; 11		13th	1007
2011	Chris Buescher	16	Ford									RCH; 17	DAR; 17																										13th	1007
2011	Kevin Swindell	16	Ford											DOV; 31	IOW																								13th	1007
2011	Matt Kenseth	16	Ford													CLT; 1																							13th	1007
2013	Chris Buescher	16	Ford	DAY	PHO	LVS	BRI; 7	CAL	TEX; 17			DAR; 12	CLT; 38	DOV	IOW	MCH; 7											ATL; 13					KAN; 16							32nd	456
2013	Ryan Reed	16	Ford							RCH; 16	TAL															BRI; 26		RCH; 9	CHI	KEN	DOV		CLT; 14		PHO; 15	HOM; 13			32nd	456
2013	Billy Johnson	16	Ford														ROA; 15	KEN	DAY	NHA; 15	CHI	IND	IOW	GLN	MOH														32nd	456
2013	Ricky Stenhouse Jr.	16	Ford																															TEX; 17					32nd	456
2014	Ryan Reed	16	Ford	DAY; 18	PHO; 22	LVS; 15	BRI; 31	CAL; 17	TEX; 20	DAR; 13	RCH; 12	TAL; 24	IOW; 16	CLT; 14	DOV; 27	MCH; 11	ROA; 21	KEN; 17	DAY; 4	NHA; 11	CHI; 15	IND; 20	IOW; 15	GLN; 12	MOH; 12	BRI; 14	ATL; 18	RCH; 16	CHI; 24	KEN; 11	DOV; 24	KAN; 12	CLT; 15	TEX; 17	PHO; 19	HOM; 27			14th	889
2015	Ryan Reed	16	Ford	DAY; 1	ATL; 16	LVS; 15	PHO; 13	CAL; 11	TEX; 15	BRI; 21	RCH; 21	TAL; 32	IOW; 12	CLT; 12	DOV; 11	MCH; 19	CHI; 12	DAY; 13	KEN; 14	NHA; 13	IND; 20	IOW; 19	GLN; 30	MOH; 22	BRI; 25	ROA; 19	DAR; 23	RCH; 13	CHI; 11	KEN; 25	DOV; 14	CLT; 11	KAN; 17	TEX; 15	PHO; 23	HOM; 17			16th	902
2016	Ryan Reed	16	Ford	DAY; 16	ATL; 15	LVS; 13	PHO; 14	CAL; 14	TEX; 14	BRI; 21	RCH; 11	TAL; 31	DOV; 18	CLT; 19	POC; 33	MCH; 14	IOW; 11	DAY; 6	KEN; 29	NHA; 14	IND; 13	IOW; 10	GLN; 9	MOH; 11	BRI; 35	ROA; 5	DAR; 13	RCH; 11	CHI; 32	KEN; 7	DOV; 10	CLT; 15	KAN; 16	TEX; 12	PHO; 6	HOM; 16			15th	2205
2017	Ryan Reed	16	Ford	DAY; 1	ATL; 18	LVS; 9	PHO; 11	CAL; 15	TEX; 11	BRI; 38	RCH; 23	TAL; 29	CLT; 11	DOV; 5	POC; 14	MCH; 8	IOW; 19	DAY; 31	KEN; 36	NHA; 14	IND; 6	IOW; 21	GLN; 15	MOH; 33	BRI; 37	ROA; 35	DAR; 15	RCH; 12	CHI; 17	KEN; 10	DOV; 16	CLT; 12	KAN; 10	TEX; 23	PHO; 14	HOM; 20			12th	2161
2018	Ryan Reed	16	Ford	DAY; 3	ATL; 10	LVS; 19	PHO; 18	CAL; 17	TEX; 14	BRI; 18	RCH; 9	TAL; 22	DOV; 19	CLT; 29	POC; 13	MCH; 4	IOW; 17	CHI; 32	DAY; 26	KEN; 8	NHA; 12	IOW; 7	GLN; 8	MOH; 10	BRI; 17	ROA; 39	DAR; 13	IND; 11	LVS; 35	RCH; 10	CLT; 11	DOV; 16	KAN; 7	TEX; 29	PHO; 12	HOM; 12			15th	757

=== Car No. 17 history ===
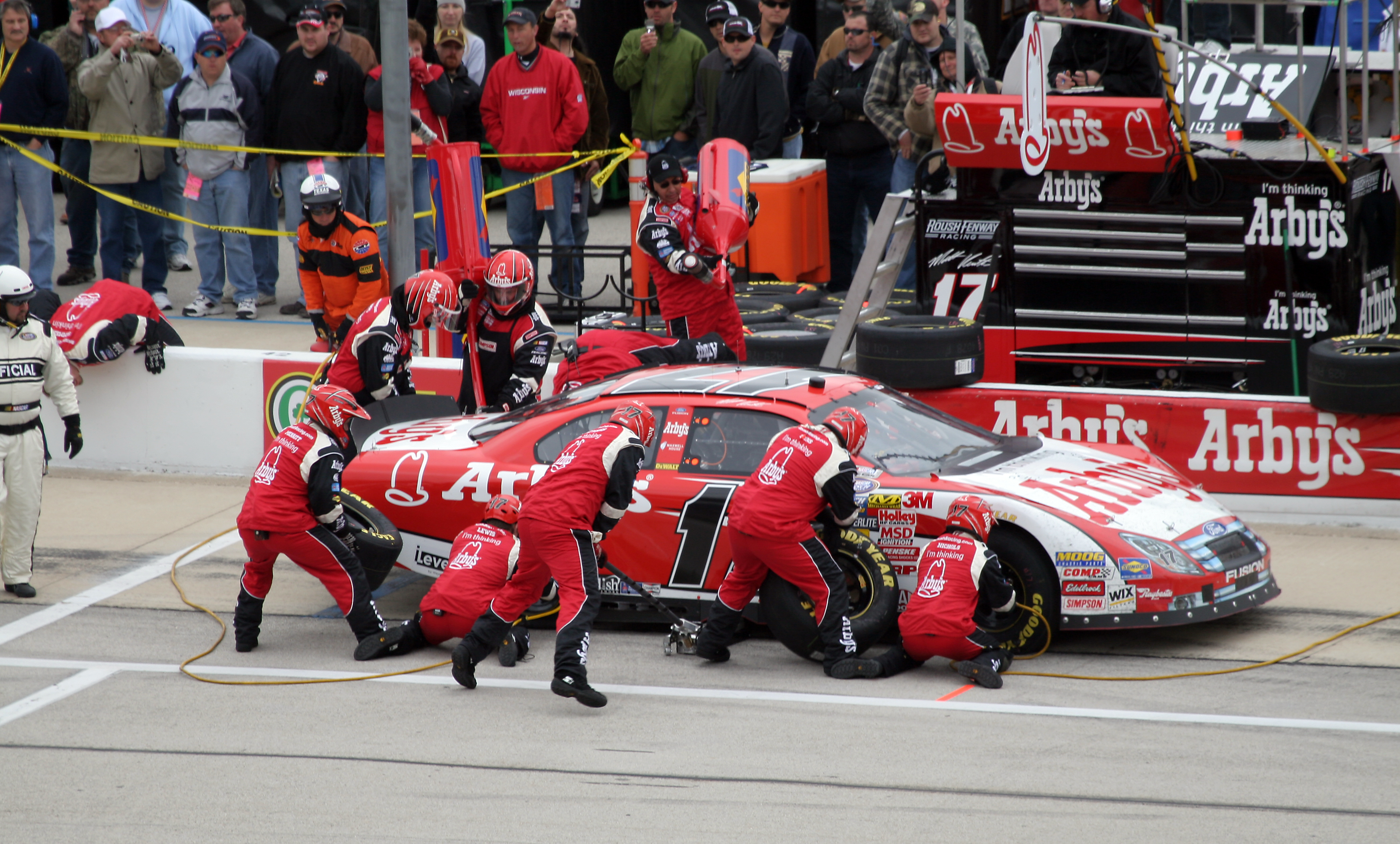
Matt Kenseth in 2007.

The 17 car debuted in 1994 at Darlington with driver/owner Robbie Reiser driving the unsponsored car to 35th after a crash. Reiser ran part-time for a few years. He hired Tim Bender to drive the car in 1997. After Bender was injured, Reiser decided to hire fellow Wisconsinite Matt Kenseth to replace him. Kenseth had seven Top 10 finishes and ended the year 22nd in points. His substitution duty was impressive enough to get him a ride in Reiser's car for the next season. Kenseth won his first race at North Carolina in 1998. Driving with new sponsorship from Lycos, he won three races and finished second in points to Dale Earnhardt Jr. DeWalt became the sponsor in 1999, with Kenseth getting an additional four wins and a third-place finish in points.

The team actually was not part of Roush Racing until 2002; Reiser, the team owner, ran Chevrolets through the 2001 season and since then, the No. 17 car has run part-time with a variety of different sponsors, with Kenseth at least co-driving each time. In 2006, the car ran on a limited basis with sponsorships from Ameriquest and Pennzoil. That year, Kenseth won three races. In 2007, the No. 17 car carried sponsorships from Arby's, Dish Network, and Weyerhaeuser and Kenseth continued driving it, along with Danny O'Quinn Jr., and Michel Jourdain Jr. The car took two wins at California and Texas. Still in the car, Kenseth finishing 10th in points despite competing only 23 races. For 2008, the car's sponsorship was expected to be the same, with Citigroup coming on board for a few races. In 2009, Kenseth raced it in the Camping World 300 at Daytona with a sponsorship form Ritz. Ricky Stenhouse Jr. was tapped to drive the car in the Dollar General 300 at Charlotte in October with Save A Lot as the main sponsor. The team did not run again until Kansas in October 2010, when Trevor Bayne drove it in six of the remaining 7 races of the 2010 season after he left Michael Waltrip Racing. The team shut down again for 2011.

==== Car No. 17 results ====
Year	Driver	No.	Make	1	2	3	4	5	6	7	8	9	10	11	12	13	14	15	16	17	18	19	20	21	22	23	24	25	26	27	28	29	30	31	32	33	34	35	Owners	Pts
1997	Tim Bender	17	Chevy	DAY; 27	CAR; 26	RCH; 29	ATL; 40	LVS; 34	DAR; 25	HCY; 30	TEX; 17																												22nd	2426
1997	Robbie Reiser	17	Chevy									BRI; 41																											22nd	2426
1997	Matt Kenseth	17	Chevy										NSV; 11	TAL; 7	NHA; 40	NZH; 34	CLT; 22	DOV; 11	SBO; 6	GLN; 36	MLW; 12	MYB; 17	GTY; 27	IRP; 6	MCH; 8	BRI; 20	DAR; 12	RCH; 22	DOV; 3	CLT; 12	CAL; 3	CAR; 32	HOM; 6						22nd	2426
1998	Matt Kenseth	17	Chevy	DAY; 6	CAR; 1	LVS; 24	NSV; 33	DAR; 4	BRI; 3	TEX; 8	HCY; 5	TAL; 8	NHA; 16	NZH; 4	CLT; 5	DOV; 40	RCH; 3	PPR; 1	GLN; 17	MLW; 5	MYB; 8	CAL; 3	SBO; 12	IRP; 6	MCH; 3	BRI; 34	DAR; 6	RCH; 4	DOV; 1*	CLT; 2	GTY; 2	CAR; 27	ATL; 4	HOM; 4					2nd	4421
1999	Matt Kenseth	17	Chevy	DAY; 4	CAR; 3*	LVS; 30	ATL; 25	DAR; 1*	TEX; 18*	NSV; 15	BRI; 35	TAL; 4	CAL; 1	NHA; 8	RCH; 3	NZH; 1	CLT; 3	DOV; 32	SBO; 6	GLN; 16	MLW; 5	MYB; 3	PPR; 7	GTY; 6	IRP; 4	MCH; 22	BRI; 1*	DAR; 3	RCH; 20	DOV; 38*	CLT; 7*	CAR; 4	MEM; 21	PHO; 8	HOM; 38				3rd	4327
2000	Matt Kenseth	17	Chevy	DAY; 1	CAR; 9	LVS; 5	ATL; 2	DAR; 2	BRI; 27	TEX; 2		TAL; 21	CAL; 1	RCH; 2		CLT; 30	DOV; 3									MCH; 8	BRI; DNQ	DAR; 8	RCH; 8	DOV; 1*	CLT; 1	CAR; 7		PHO; 6	HOM; 8				17th	3022
2000	Jason Schuler	17	Chevy								NSV; 32				NHA; 14			SBO; 38	MYB; 32	GLN; 22	MLW; 21	NZH; 16	PPR; 30	GTY; 14	IRP; 33								MEM; 17						17th	3022
2001	Matt Kenseth	17	Chevy	DAY; 3		LVS; 34	ATL; 30	DAR; 2*	BRI; 1	TEX; 5		TAL; 21	CAL; 20	RCH; 4			CLT; 2	DOV; 2		MLW; 2		CHI; 30				MCH; 12	BRI; 30	DAR; 7	RCH; 2	DOV; 10	KAN; 4	CLT; 16*		PHO; 22	CAR; 2	HOM; 5			18th	3167
2001	Clay Rogers	17	Chevy		CAR; 18						NSH; 37				NHA; 37	NZH; 23			KEN; 39				GTY; 34	PPR; 35	IRP; 30								MEM; 12						18th	3167
2001	Boris Said	17	Chevy																		GLN; 4																		18th	3167
2002	Matt Kenseth	17	Ford	DAY; 3	CAR	LVS; 39	DAR	BRI; 43	TEX; 9	NSH	TAL	CAL	RCH	NHA	NZH	CLT	DOV	NSH	KEN	MLW	DAY	CHI	GTY	PPR	IRP	MCH	BRI	DAR	RCH	DOV	KAN	CLT	MEM	ATL	CAR	PHO	HOM		54th	390
2003	Matt Kenseth	17	Ford	DAY; 2	CAR	LVS; 42	DAR	BRI	TEX; 7	TAL	NSH	CAL; 1	RCH	GTY	NZH	CLT; 1	DOV; 4*	NSH				CHI; 2	NHA; 3	PPR	IRP	MCH; 18	BRI; 25	DAR	RCH; 6*	DOV	KAN	CLT; QL^{†}	MEM	ATL; 2*	PHO; 19	CAR	HOM; 38		31st	2102
2003	Wally Dallenbach Jr.	17	Ford																KEN; 12	MLW	DAY																		31st	2102
2003	Jeff Burton	17	Ford																													CLT; 38							31st	2102
2004	Matt Kenseth	17	Ford	DAY; 5	CAR	LVS	DAR	BRI	TEX; 1	NSH	TAL	CAL; 4*	GTY	RCH	NZH	CLT	DOV; 35	NSH				CHI; 16	NHA; 1	PPR	IRP	MCH; 42	BRI; 2	CAL; 12	RCH	DOV	KAN	CLT; 2	MEM	ATL; 1*	PHO; 8	DAR	HOM; 6		32nd	1950
2004	Johnny Benson Jr.	17	Ford																KEN; 29	MLW	DAY																		32nd	1950
2005	Matt Kenseth	17	Ford	DAY; DNQ	CAL; 9	MXC	LVS	ATL; 4	NSH	BRI; 4	TEX; 7	PHO	TAL	DAR; 1*	RCH; 8	CLT	DOV; DNQ	NSH	KEN	MLW	DAY	CHI; 8	NHA; 9	PPR	GTY	IRP	GLN	MCH	BRI	CAL	RCH; 3	DOV; 38	KAN; 7	CLT	MEM	TEX	PHO; 3	HOM; 36	39th	1818
2006	Matt Kenseth	17	Ford	DAY	CAL; 6	MXC	LVS; 2	ATL; 4	BRI; 3	TEX; 5	NSH	PHO; 7	TAL	RCH; 3	DAR; 2*	CLT; 38*	DOV; 26	NSH	KEN	MLW	DAY	CHI; 5	NHA	MAR	GTY	IRP	GLN	MCH; 4	BRI; 1	CAL; 7	RCH; 3	DOV; 2	KAN; 2*	CLT; 4	MEM	TEX; 26	PHO; 1*	HOM; 1*	27th	3221
2007	Matt Kenseth	17	Ford	DAY; 12	CAL; 1*		LVS; 40	ATL; 9	BRI; 2	NSH	TEX; 1	PHO; 2		RCH; 2	DAR; 37	CLT; 7	DOV; 5	NSH			NHA; 3	DAY	CHI; 2	GTY	IRP		GLN; 6	MCH; 2	BRI; 34	CAL; 28	RCH; 4	DOV; 3	KAN; 2*	CLT; 31	MEM	TEX; 5	PHO; 2	HOM; 3	10th	3833
2007	Michel Jourdain Jr.	17	Ford			MXC; 25																				CGV; 16													10th	3833
2007	Danny O'Quinn Jr.	17	Ford										TAL; 11						KEN; 38	MLW																			10th	3833
2008	Matt Kenseth	17	Ford	DAY; 5			ATL; 1	BRI	NSH	TEX	PHO			RCH; 12	DAR; 28	CLT	DOV	NSH	KEN	MLW	NHA	DAY	CHI; 17				GLN; 3	MCH	BRI				KAN; 5						34th	2070
2008	Jamie McMurray	17	Ford		CAL; 6	LVS																		GTY; 27	IRP	CGV				CAL; 5	RCH	DOV; 8		CLT; 9	MEM	TEX; 35	PHO; 7	HOM; 19	34th	2070
2008	Erik Darnell	17	Ford									MXC; 26	TAL																										34th	2070
2009	Matt Kenseth	17	Ford	DAY; 10	CAL	LVS	BRI	TEX	NSH	PHO	TAL	RCH	DAR	CLT	DOV	NSH	KEN	MLW	NHA	DAY	CHI	GTY	IRP	IOW	GLN	MCH	BRI	CGV	ATL	RCH	DOV	KAN	CAL						61st	182
2009	Ricky Stenhouse Jr.	17	Ford																															CLT; 33	MEM	TEX	PHO	HOM	61st	182
2010	Trevor Bayne	17	Ford	DAY	CAL	LVS	BRI	NSH	PHO	TEX	TAL	RCH	DAR	DOV	CLT	NSH	KEN	ROA	NHA	DAY	CHI	GTY	IRP	IOW	GLN	MCH	BRI	CGV	ATL	RCH	DOV	KAN; 30	CAL; 11	CLT; 17	GTY	TEX; 12	PHO; 14	HOM; 5	48th	650

=== Car No. 26 history ===
The No. 26 Ford debuted as the No. 50 at Daytona in 2006. Danny O'Quinn Jr. was the driver, with primary sponsorships from World Financial Group and Stonebridge Life Insurance Company, members of the Aegon group, after beginning the season with sponsorship from Roush Racing only. Drew Blickensderfer was the crew chief. O'Quinn had five top-ten finishes and was named Rookie of the Year despite being replaced by David Ragan for two races. The team switched to the No. 26 for 2007, with Greg Biffle driving at Daytona with the Oreo sponsorship. Jamie McMurray then drove the car for the majority of the season sponsored by Dish Network, finishing in the top-ten three times. Todd Kluever drove twice with a best finish of nineteenth. This team did not return in 2008.

==== Car No. 26 results ====
Year	Driver	No.	Make	1	2	3	4	5	6	7	8	9	10	11	12	13	14	15	16	17	18	19	20	21	22	23	24	25	26	27	28	29	30	31	32	33	34	35	Owners	Pts
2006	Danny O'Quinn Jr.	50	Ford	DAY; 18	CAL; 31	MXC; 26	LVS; 25	ATL; 25	BRI; 11	TEX; 32	NSH; 14	PHO; 14	TAL; 38	RCH; 20	DAR; 38	CLT; 22	DOV; 24	NSH; 10	KEN; 23	MLW; 7	DAY; 41	CHI; 31	NHA; 29	MAR; 22	GTY; 24	IRP; 6	GLN; 25	MCH; 20	BRI; 26		RCH; 14		KAN; 18	CLT; 5	MEM; 9	TEX; 30	PHO; 32	HOM; 35	25th	3312
2006	David Ragan	50	Ford																											CAL; 41		DOV; 18							25th	3312
2007	Greg Biffle	26	Ford	DAY; 10	CAL	MXC	LVS																																36th	1851
2007	Jamie McMurray	26	Ford					ATL; 14	BRI	NSH	TEX	PHO; 17	TAL	RCH	DAR													MCH; 11	BRI; 9	CAL; 8	RCH; 12	DOV; 40	KAN; 5	CLT; 38	MEM; 7	TEX	PHO; 9	HOM; 19	36th	1851
2007	Todd Kluever	26	Ford													CLT; 15	DOV	NSH	KEN	MLW			GTY; 26	IRP	CGV	GLN	MCH												36th	1851
2007	Danny O'Quinn Jr.	26	Ford																		NHA; 22	DAY																	36th	1851

=== Car No. 60 history ===
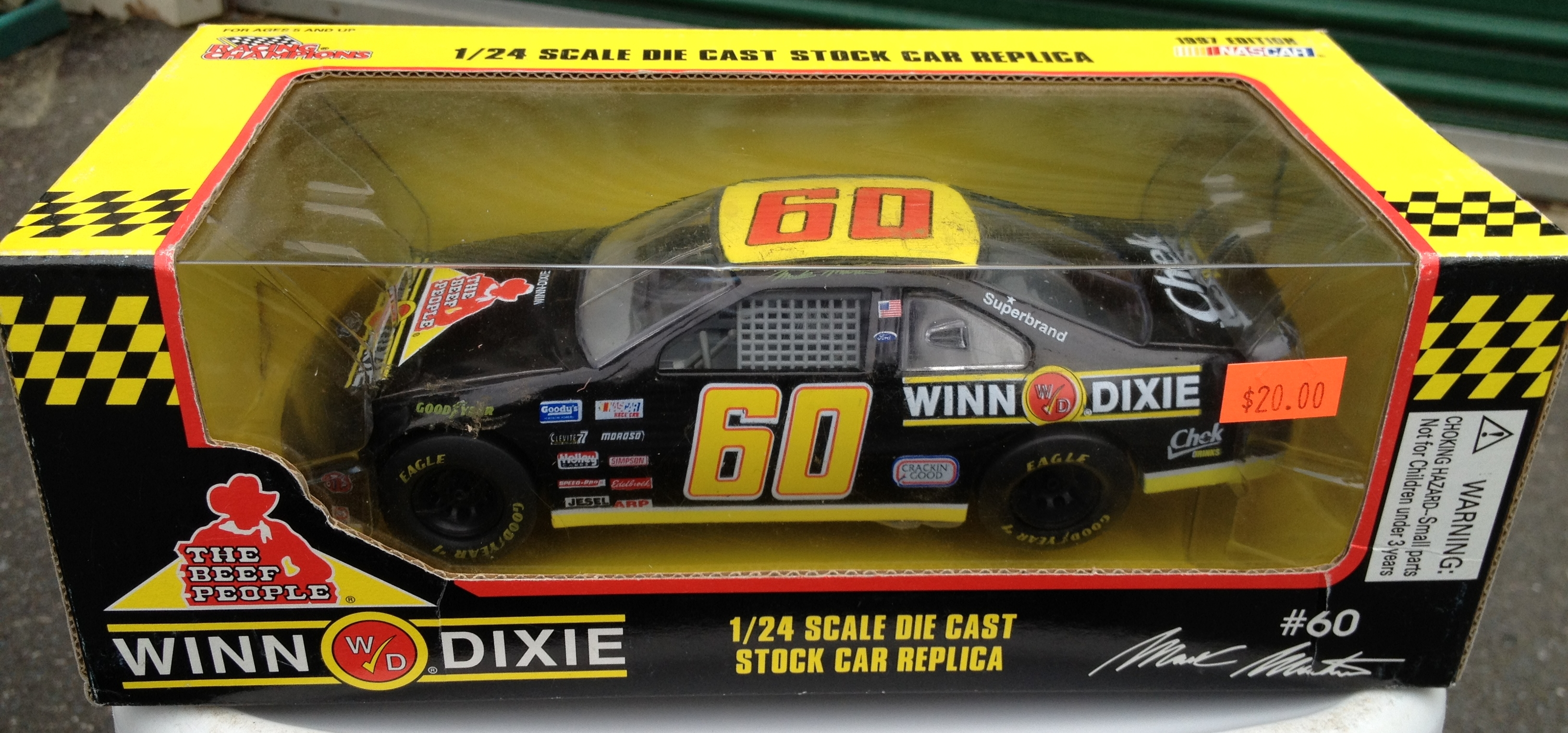
A diecast model of Mark Martin's No. 60 Busch car from the 1990s.

==== Mark Martin (1992-2000) ====
The centerpiece and original car of Roush Racing's Busch operation debuted at the opening race of the 1992 Busch Series season at Daytona. Mark Martin was driving with Winn-Dixie as the sponsor, finishing seventh in that race. For the next several years, this was Martin's personal Busch car and he won enough races to surpass Jack Ingram as the all-time leader of wins in the Busch Series (since surpassed by Kyle Busch). During this time, he and several other Winston Cup drivers came under steep controversy for running the Busch Series as well as Cup. These drivers earned the nickname "Buschwackers."

==== Greg Biffle (2001-2002, 2004) ====
After the 2000 season, Martin abbreviated his Busch Series schedule, and Winn-Dixie left NASCAR as a sponsor. His replacement was one of Roush's Truck Series drivers Greg Biffle, who brought sponsor W. W. Grainger with him. Biffle had a phenomenal rookie season, winning five times and even leading the championship standings at one point in the season before falling to Kevin Harvick. Biffle returned in 2002, winning four more times and the championship by a wide margin before moving on to Winston Cup, bringing Grainger with him.

For 2003 Roush hired Hollywood stuntman Stanton Barrett, who to that point was a journeyman driver, to drive the No. 60 with OdoBan sponsoring. Despite winning two consecutive poles, the car lost its sponsor and folded before the end of the season. Charter Communications began sponsoring the car in 2004 and Biffle returned to drive the car full-time, winning five times and placing third in the series points standings.

==== Carl Edwards (2005-2011) ====
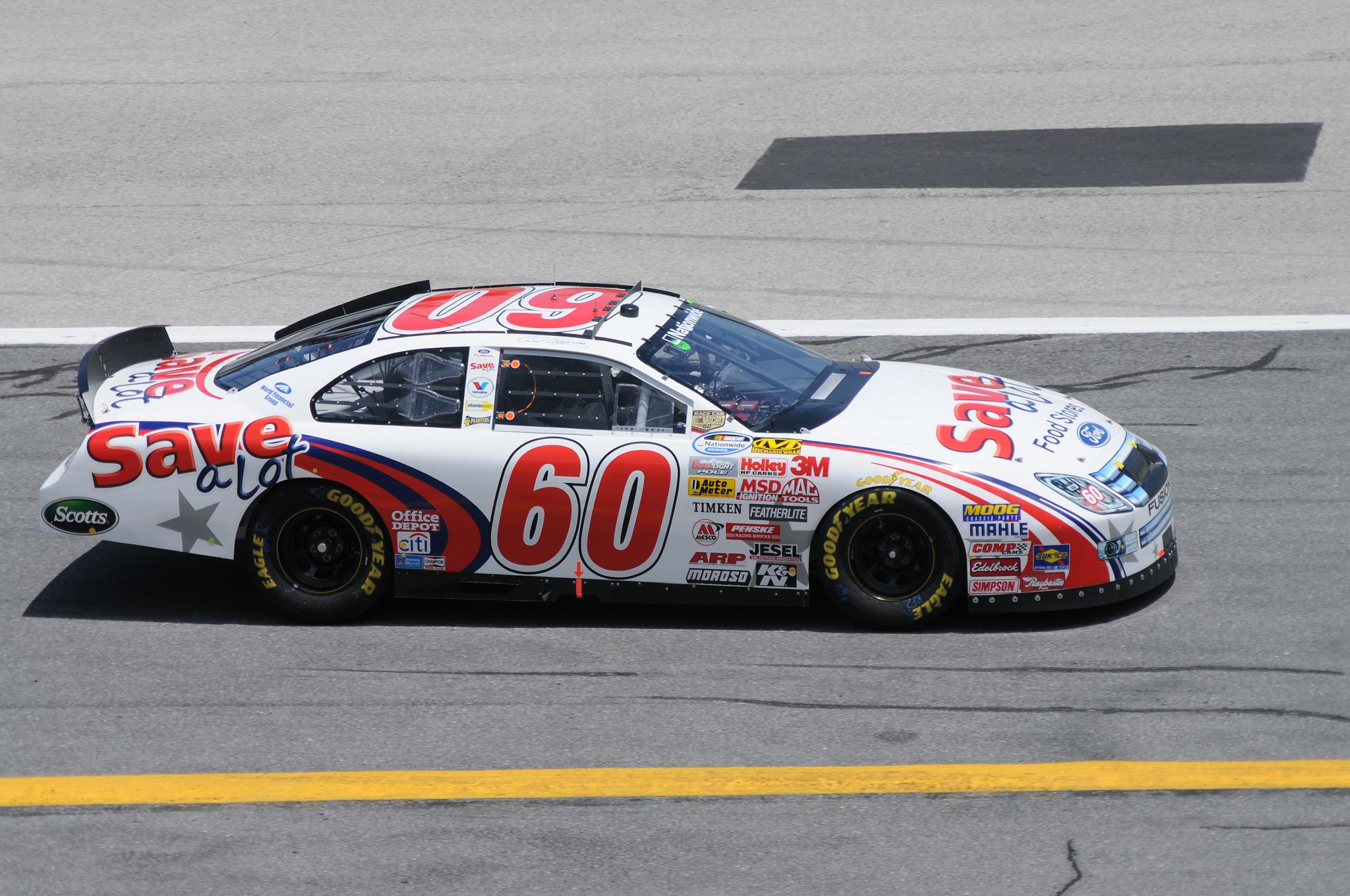
Carl Edwards in 2008 at Daytona

In 2005, Busch Series rookie and Cup Series regular Carl Edwards moved into the 60 car, winning five races en route to finishing third in points, and earning Rookie of the Year honors. Edwards returned to drive the Ameriquest-sponsored Ford for a full-time schedule in 2006, winning four more times and was runner-up for the championship.

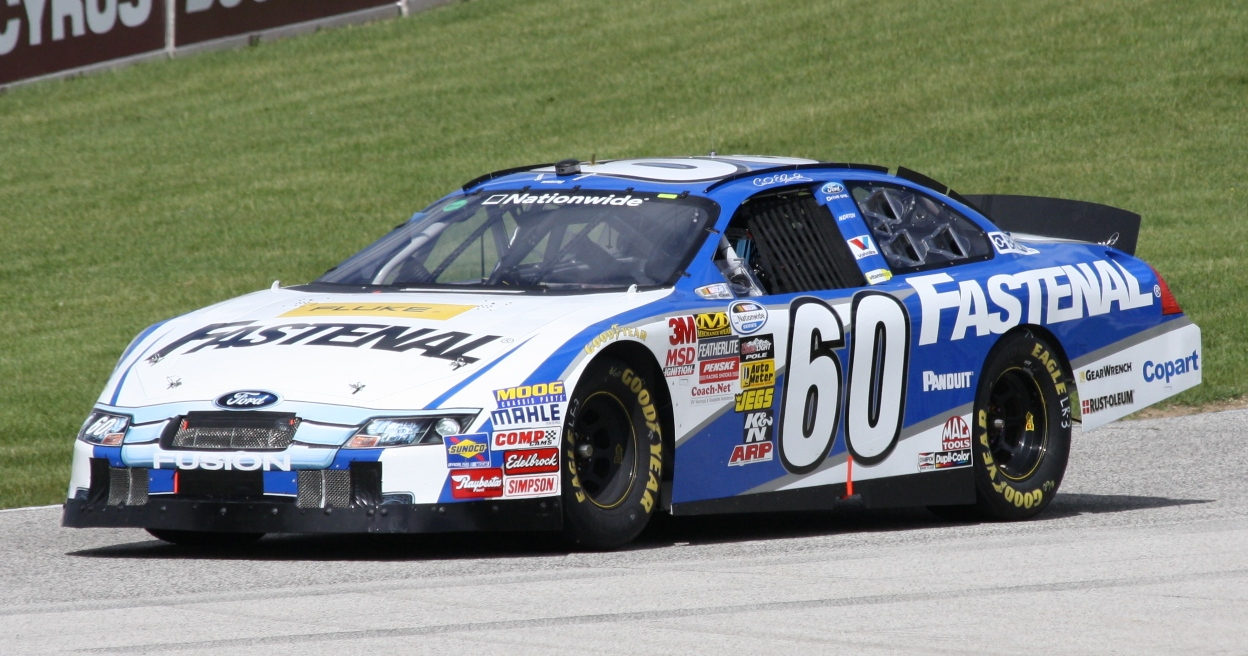
2010 Road America winning car

Edwards continued to pilot the car in 2007, with rotating sponsorship from Scotts, World Financial Group, and others. Edwards and the No. 60 team went on to win the 2007 Busch Grand National Series Championship by a very wide margin over David Reutimann. In 2008 he won five races and finished second in points behind Clint Bowyer in the inaugural Nationwide Series season. Edwards finished second in points again in 2009, finishing behind Kyle Busch. In 2010, Edwards ran for the Nationwide Series Championship again with co-sponsorship from Fastenal and Copart. Despite winning at Road America, Gateway, and Texas, Edwards finished runner-up to Brad Keselowski. Edwards drove the No. 60 again in 2011 with only half of the season sponsored by Fastenal. Despite being unable to compete for the drivers championship, as well as missing Road America, Edwards scored a career-high eight wins in 2011 and won the Owners Championship for Jack Roush. With the departure of crew chief Mike Beam to Kyle Busch Motorsports, Edwards announced that he would not contest the Nationwide Series owners championship the next season.

==== Trevor Bayne (2012) ====
In 2012, Trevor Bayne's No. 16 crew moved over to the No. 60 and ran the first five races with the intent of running the full season. They ended up being sidelined by a lack of sponsorship. Later in 2012, the 60 returned with Edwards at Watkins Glen with Subway sponsoring. Edwards would subsequently win the race. At Montreal, the car was fielded for Roush road course driver Billy Johnson, who finished 8th. The team returned with Bayne at Bristol with backing from the Pat Summit Foundation. At the fall Richmond race, Travis Pastrana drove the car with Ford EcoBoost sponsorship, qualifying fifth and finishing 17th.

==== Travis Pastrana (2013) ====
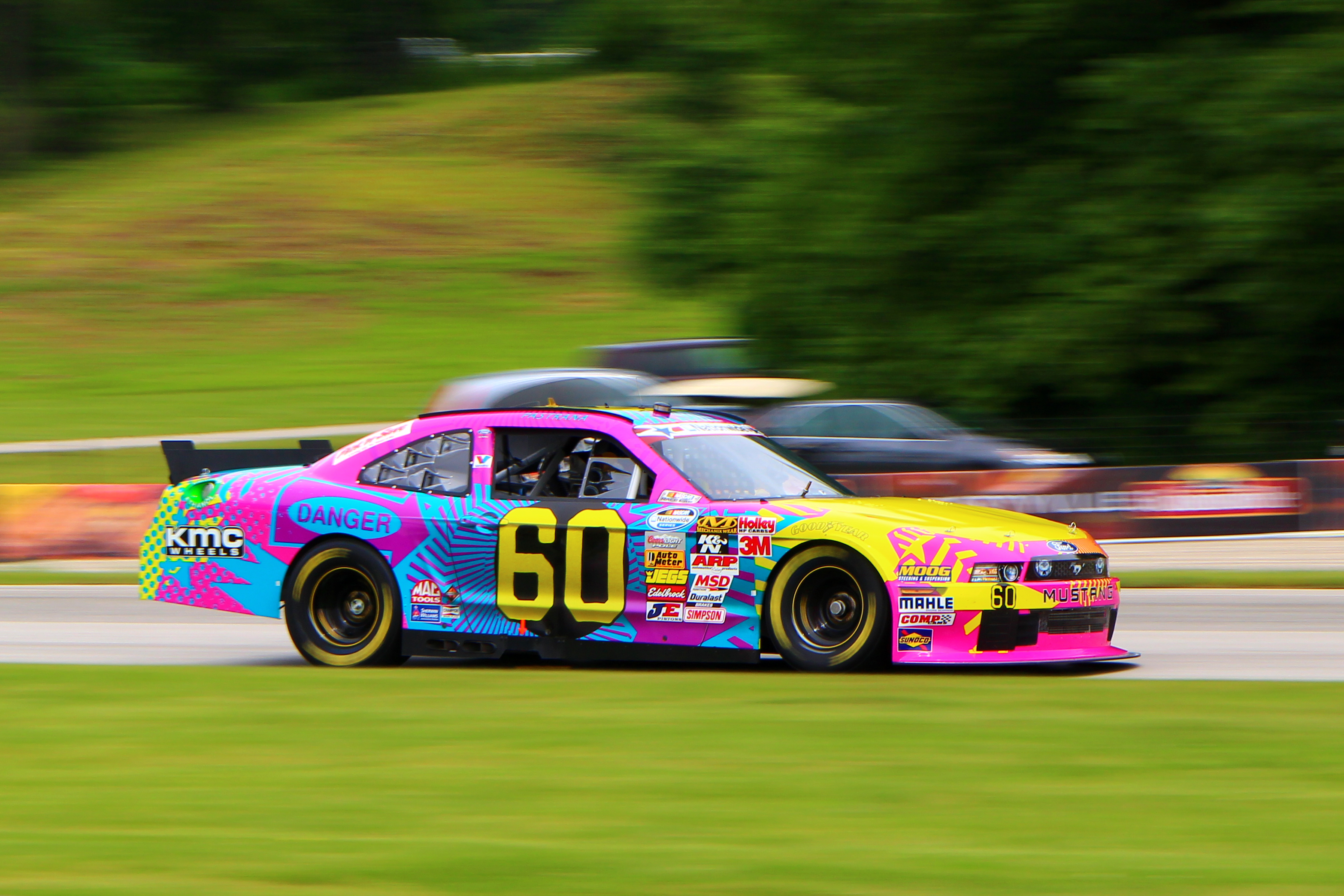
Travis Pastrana at the 2013 Johnsonville Sausage 200 at Road America

Pastrana would drive the No. 60 for the full season in 2013. his first full season of NASCAR competition. While he often showed speed, including a pole at Talladega, Pastrana struggled in his transition from Rally cars to heavier stock cars which led to several crashes. On November 11, 2013, Pastrana announced that he would be leaving full-time NASCAR competition in 2014 due to the performance struggles and lack of sponsorship. He finished the season 14th in points with four top tens.

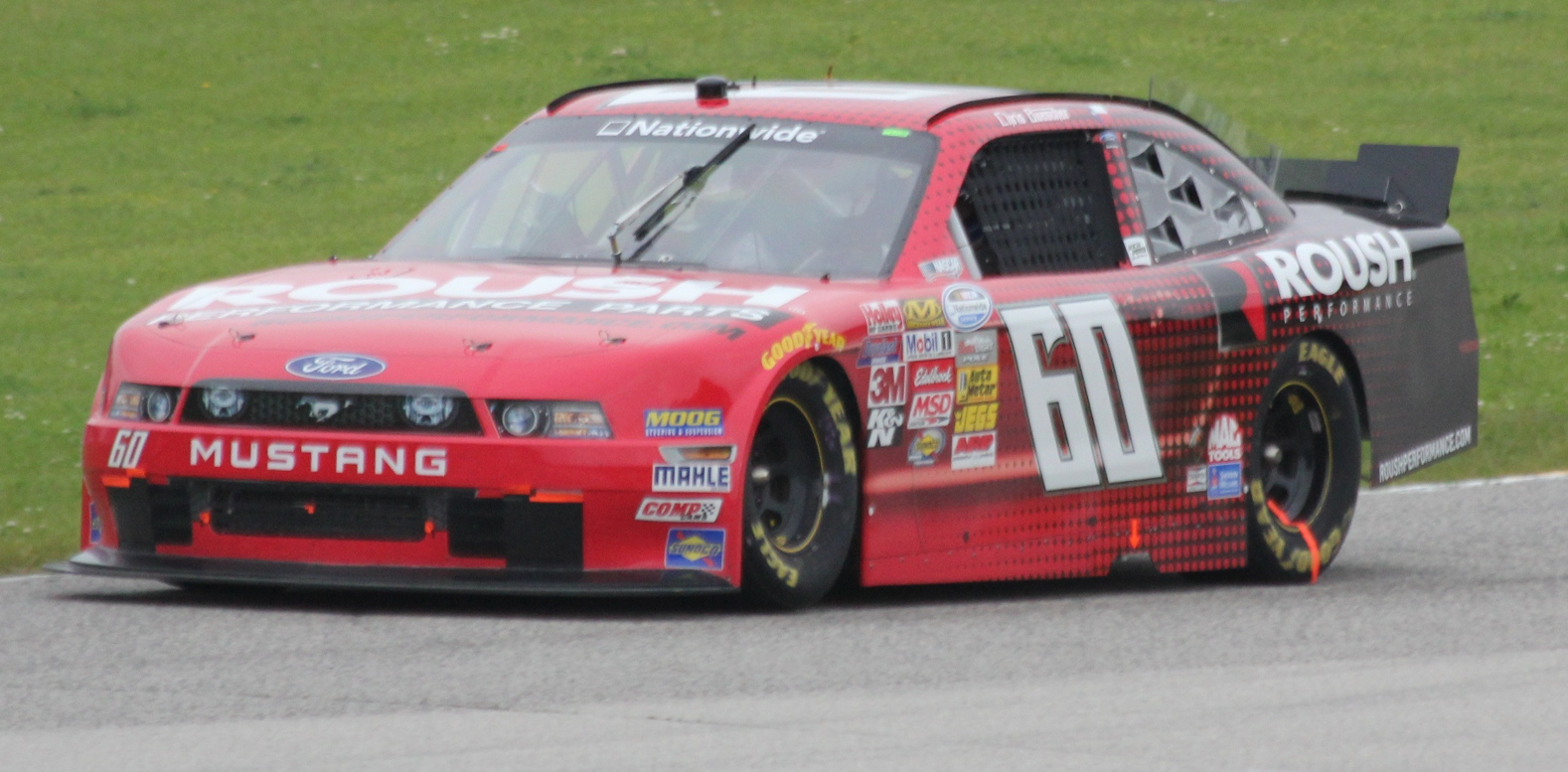
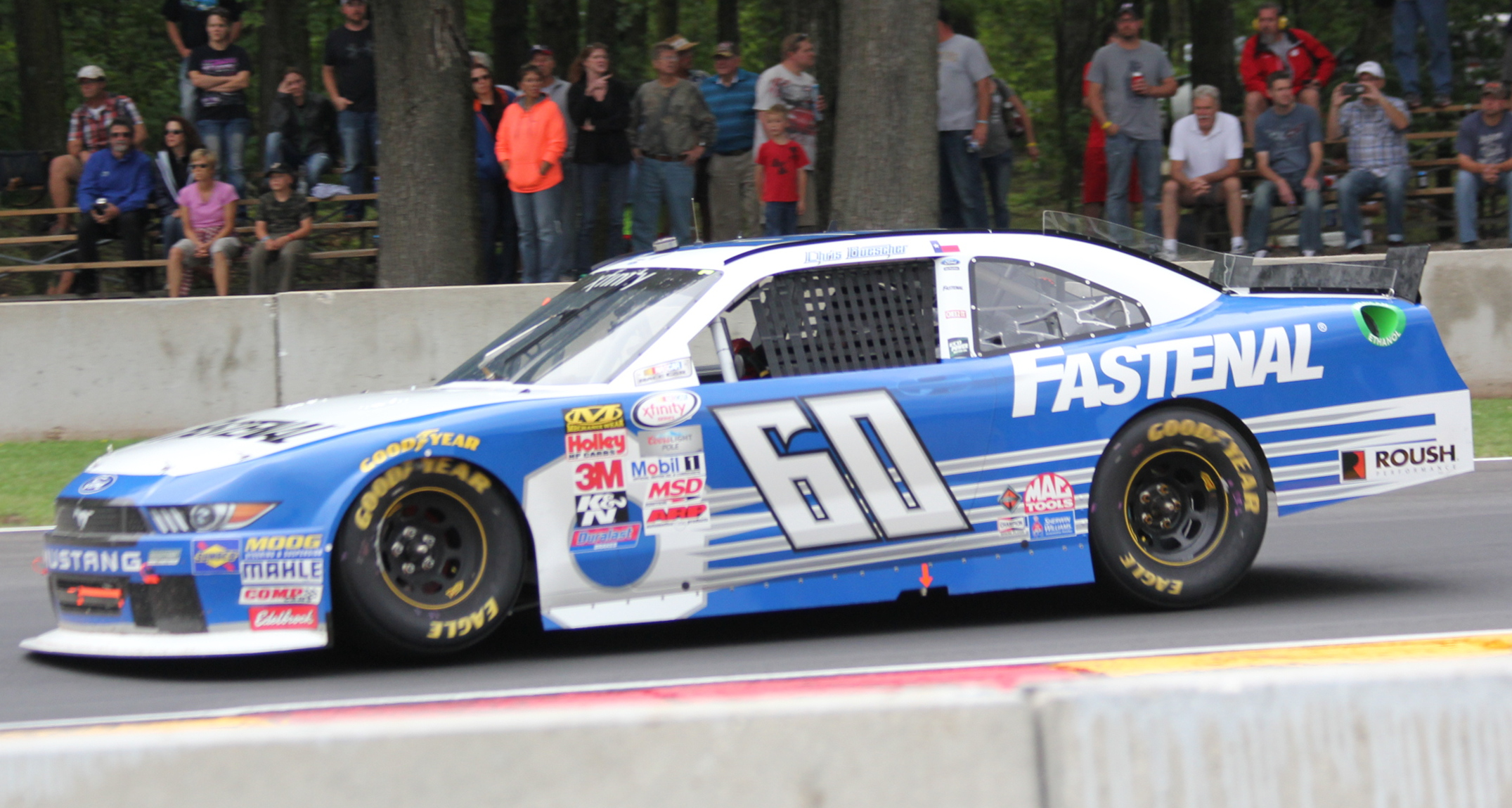
Chris Buescher's Roush Performance Mustang (top) in 2014, and Fastenal Mustang (bottom) in 2015.

==== Chris Buescher (2014-2015) ====
2012 ARCA champion Chris Buescher began driving the No. 60 in 2014 and competed for the Rookie of the Year award against a strong rookie class. After failing to qualify at Daytona, Buscher had a solid rookie season in spite of Roush Fenway's struggles as an organization. Buescher finished 9th at Las Vegas, 7th at Richmond, 2nd at Talladega, 9th at Charlotte, 11th at Dover, 10th at Michigan, and 12th at the July Daytona race. Buescher finished fifth at New Hampshire to earn a spot in the second Nationwide Dash 4 Cash race at Chicagoland; he would finish 8th at Chicago and 11th at Indianapolis. Fastenal returned to sponsor the 60 at Iowa, where Buescher finished 14th. Cup sponsors Kellogg's and Cheez-It sponsored the car at Watkins Glen. Buescher scored his first career victory at Mid-Ohio Sports Car Course in the Nationwide Children's Hospital 200, the third rookie to win season and the only win for Roush in the Nationwide Series in 2014. Buescher would finish 7th in points with 14 top tens, and the No. 60 would finish 11th in owners points.

Buescher returned to the No. 60 in 2015. Cup sponsors Fastenal, Cheez-It, Safety-Kleen, and AdvoCare came on to sponsor several races, along with Bit-O-Honey and Salted Nut Roll manufactured by the Pearson's Candy Company. Buescher finished second in the Daytona season-opener behind teammate Ryan Reed. He scored his first victory of the season at Iowa in May, on a green-white-checkered finish. He scored his second win later in the month at Dover, after pit-stop strategy and contact with pole sitter and teammate Bubba Wallace racing for the lead. After 24 consecutive weeks as the points leader, Buescher won his first Xfinity Series title and the eighth for Roush, with 11 top fives, 20 top tens, and an average finish of 8.4.

==== Part-time (2016-2017) ====
The No. 60 returned on a part-time basis for 2016. Trevor Bayne drove one race at Waltkins Glen with sponsorship AdvoCare. Gray Gaulding drove two races beginning at Bristol in August. Ricky Stenhouse Jr. drove the car at Phoenix in November, with a sponsorship from SunnyD.

==== Austin Cindric, Chase Briscoe, and Ty Majeski (2018) ====
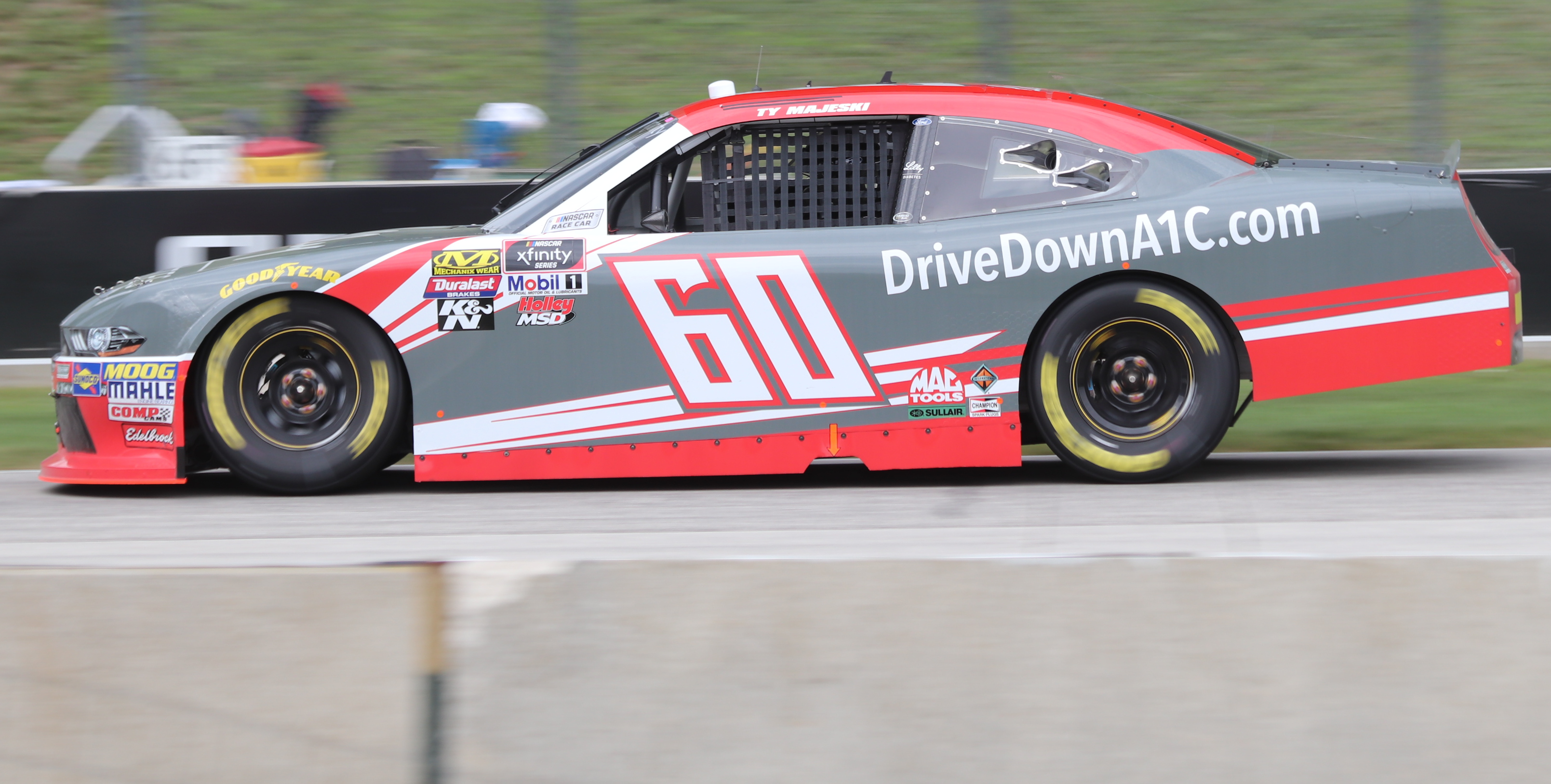
Majeski racing in the 2018 Xfinity Series race at Road America

For the 2018 season, the No. 60 car was shared between development drivers Austin Cindric, Chase Briscoe, and Ty Majeski, with Mike Kelley as crew chief. It was the team's worst full-time season, as the car was involved in 28 spins or crashes out of the 33 races. The team finished the season 22nd in points and a combined five top-10 finishes with the best finish being a 7th by Majeski in Iowa and had 11 DNFs with a combined average finish of 23.3. Following the season, Roush Fenway Racing shut down its Xfinity program. Although the season was a disaster, it accomplished what it was meant to do and further the three drivers' careers. Cindric has since moved to the Team Penske No. 2 Cup team, scoring his first win in the 2022 Daytona 500 in his 8th Cup Series start while Briscoe drove the No. 14 Cup car for Stewart–Haas Racing, scoring his first win at Phoenix in 2022 in his 40th Cup Series start while also scoring another win at Darlington in 2024 before the team shut down and he moved on to Joe Gibbs Racing driving the No. 19 in 2025 replacing Martin Truex Jr. As of 2026, Majeski drives the No. 88 Ford F-Series for ThorSport Racing in the Truck Series winning the Truck Series championship in 2024.

==== Car No. 60 results ====
Year	Driver	No.	Make	1	2	3	4	5	6	7	8	9	10	11	12	13	14	15	16	17	18	19	20	21	22	23	24	25	26	27	28	29	30	31	32	33	34	35	Owners	Pts
1992	Mark Martin	60	Ford	DAY; 7	CAR; 2	RCH	ATL; 8	MAR	DAR; 32	BRI	HCY	LAN	DUB	NZH; 3^{*}	CLT; 33^{*}	DOV	ROU	MYB	GLN; 30	VOL	NHA	TAL; 27	IRP	ROU	MCH	NHA	BRI	DAR; 6	RCH; 3	DOV	CLT; 31	MAR; 7	CAR; 1^{*}	HCY; 5					21st	1775
1993	Mark Martin	60	Ford	DAY; DNQ	CAR; 1^{*}	RCH; 1^{*}	DAR; 30	BRI; 27	HCY; 26	ROU	MAR	NZH	CLT; 35	DOV	MYB	GLN	MLW	TAL; 33	IRP	MCH; 1^{*}	NHA	BRI	DAR; 1^{*}	RCH; 1^{*}	DOV	ROU	CLT; 1^{*}	MAR	CAR; 1^{*}	HCY	ATL; 26								24th	1744
1994	Mark Martin	60	Ford	DAY; 23	CAR; 8^{*}	RCH; 8	ATL; 29	MAR	DAR; 1^{*}	HCY	BRI; 11^{*}	ROU	NHA	NZH	CLT; 2^{*}	DOV; 3	MYB	GLN	MLW	SBO	TAL; 43	HCY	IRP	MCH; 3^{*}	BRI	DAR; 1^{*}	RCH; 2	DOV	CLT; 2^{*}	MAR	CAR; 1^{*}								20th	2132
1995	Mark Martin	60	Ford	DAY; 8^{*}	CAR; 2	RCH; 33	ATL; 39	NSV	DAR; 3	BRI; 2^{*}	HCY	NHA	NZH	CLT; 4	DOV; 41	MYB	GLN	MLW	TAL; 30	SBO	IRP	MCH; 1	BRI	DAR; 1^{*}	RCH; 2^{*}	DOV	CLT; 1^{*}	CAR; 8	HOM; 5										22nd	2037
1996	Mark Martin	60	Ford	DAY; 3	CAR; 1^{*}	RCH; 35^{*}	ATL; 7^{*}	NSV	DAR; 1	BRI; 1^{*}	HCY	NZH	CLT; 1	DOV	SBO	MYB	GLN	MLW	NHA	TAL; 27	IRP	MCH; 4^{*}	BRI	DAR; 2	RCH; 4	DOV	CLT; 1^{*}	CAR; 1^{*}	HOM; 3										21st	2186
1997	Mark Martin	60	Ford	DAY; 35	CAR; 1^{*}	RCH; 1	ATL; 1^{*}	LVS	DAR; 4	HCY	TEX; 1	BRI; 38	NSV	TAL; 1^{*}	NHA	NZH	CLT; 3	DOV	SBO	GLN	MLW	MYB	GTY	IRP	MCH; 11^{*}	BRI	DAR; 6	RCH; 8	DOV	CLT; 2	CAL	CAR; 1	HOM; 3						24th	2104
1998	Mark Martin	60	Ford	DAY; 3	CAR; 3	LVS; 6	NSV	DAR; 24	BRI	TEX; 21	HCY	TAL; 29	NHA	NZH	CLT; 1^{*}	DOV	RCH; 5	PPR	GLN	MLW	MYB	CAL	SBO	IRP	MCH; 6	BRI	DAR; 8	RCH; 35	DOV	CLT; 43	GTY	CAR; 3	ATL; 1	HOM; 3					27th	1976
1999	Mark Martin	60	Ford	DAY; 39	CAR; 2	LVS; 1^{*}	ATL; 6	DAR; 39	TEX; 1	NSV	BRI	TAL; DNQ	CAL	NHA	RCH; 1	NZH	CLT; 1^{*}	DOV	SBO	GLN	MLW	MYB	PPR	GTY	IRP	MCH; 5	BRI	DAR; 1^{*}	RCH; 2^{*}	DOV	CLT; 36	CAR; 1^{*}	MEM	PHO	HOM; 14				26th	2048
2000	Mark Martin	60	Ford	DAY	CAR; 1^{*}	LVS; 2	ATL; 1^{*}	DAR; 1	BRI	TEX; 1	NSV	TAL	CAL	RCH; 4^{*}	NHA	CLT; 2	DOV; 2	SBO	MYB	GLN	MLW	NZH	PPR	GTY	IRP	MCH; DNQ	BRI	DAR; 1	RCH; 3	DOV	CLT; 2	CAR; 6	MEM	PHO	HOM; 2^{*}				27th	2280
2001	Greg Biffle	60	Ford	DAY; 22	CAR; 3	LVS; 2	ATL; 2	DAR; 11	BRI; 30	TEX; 7	NSH; 1*	TAL; 9	CAL; 6	RCH; 37	NHA; 11	NZH; 1*	CLT; 6	DOV; 9	KEN; 2	MLW; 1	GLN; 2	CHI; 39	GTY; 4	PPR; 5	IRP; 2	MCH; 43	BRI; 18	DAR; 15	RCH; 35	DOV; 5	KAN; 3	CLT; 1	MEM; 20	PHO; 1*	CAR; 12	HOM; 3			4th	4509
2002	Greg Biffle	60	Ford	DAY; 22	CAR; 2	LVS; 9	DAR; 2	BRI; 5	TEX; 17	NSH; 33	TAL; 26	CAL; 10	RCH; 3	NHA; 31	NZH; 27	CLT; 2	DOV; 1	NSH; 3	KEN; 2	MLW; 1	DAY; 2	CHI; 8	GTY; 1	PPR; 2	IRP; 1	MCH; 42	BRI; 3	DAR; 4	RCH; 6	DOV; 17	KAN; 4	CLT; 6	MEM; 34	ATL; 5	CAR; 2	PHO; 3	HOM; 4		1st	4924
2003	Stanton Barrett	60	Ford	DAY; 41	CAR; 19	LVS; 8	DAR; 15	BRI; 16	TEX; 19	TAL; 40	NSH; 6	CAL; 34	RCH; 41	GTY; 9	NZH; 20	CLT; 22	DOV; 12	NSH; 7	KEN	MLW	DAY	CHI	NHA	PPR	IRP	MCH	BRI	DAR	RCH	DOV	KAN	CLT	MEM	ATL	PHO	CAR	HOM		35th	1546
2004	Greg Biffle	60	Ford	DAY; 11	CAR; 38	LVS; 10	DAR; 1	BRI; 4	TEX; 34	NSH; 40	TAL; 21	CAL; 1	GTY; 7	RCH; 2	NZH; 32	CLT; 6	DOV; 1	NSH; 13	KEN; 2	MLW; 7	DAY; 2	CHI; 32	NHA; 30	PPR; 1	IRP; 5	MCH; 8	BRI; 33	CAL; 1	RCH; 11	DOV; 14	KAN; 2	CLT; 4	MEM; 2	ATL; 5	PHO; 5	DAR; 37	HOM; 10		3rd	4568
2005	Carl Edwards	60	Ford	DAY; 10	CAL; 6	MXC; 3	LVS; 7*	ATL; 1	NSH; 4	BRI; 7	TEX; 4	PHO; 8	TAL; 33	DAR; 11	RCH; 1	CLT; 35	DOV; 31	NSH; QL^{†}	KEN; 1*	MLW; 14	DAY; 36	CHI; 4	NHA; 2	PPR; 34	GTY; 3	IRP; 20	GLN; 11	MCH; 3	BRI; 29	CAL; 1	RCH; 28	DOV; 9	KAN; 27	CLT; 4	MEM; 5	TEX; 3	PHO; 1*	HOM; 19	3rd	4704
2005	Hank Parker Jr.	60	Ford															NSH; 20																					3rd	4704
2006	Carl Edwards	60	Ford	DAY; 39	CAL; 3	MXC; 8	LVS; 5	ATL; 24	BRI; 5	TEX; 43	NSH; 5	PHO; 3	TAL; 10	RCH; 6	DAR; 8	CLT; 1	DOV; 2*	NSH; 1*	KEN; 36	MLW; 21	DAY; 5	CHI; 2	NHA; 1	MAR; 6	GTY; 1	IRP; 10	GLN; 27	MCH; 23	BRI; 8	CAL; 12	RCH; 9	DOV; 26	KAN; 6	CLT; 27*	MEM; 3	TEX; 7	PHO; 5	HOM; 2	2nd	4824
2007	Carl Edwards	60	Ford	DAY; 3	CAL; 4	MXC; 4	LVS; 6	ATL; 4	BRI; 1*	NSH; 1*	TEX; 3	PHO; 5	TAL; 10	RCH; 13	DAR; 3	CLT; 17	DOV; 1*	NSH; 1	KEN; 33*	MLW; 8*	NHA; 2	DAY; 11	CHI; 20	GTY; 6	IRP; 4	CGV; 30	GLN; 32	MCH; 28	BRI; 11	CAL; 26	RCH; 2	DOV; 6	KAN; 38	CLT; 33	MEM; 25	TEX; 11	PHO; 7	HOM; 4	3rd	4805
2008	Carl Edwards	60	Ford	DAY; 10	CAL; 5	LVS; 14	ATL; 4	BRI; 14	NSH; 3	TEX; 13	PHO; 2	MXC; 4	TAL; 31	RCH; 7*	DAR; 43	CLT; 13	DOV; 2	NSH; 13	KEN; 20	MLW; 1	NHA; 5	DAY; 11	CHI; 16	GTY; 1*	IRP; 11	CGV; 6	GLN; 25	MCH; 1*	BRI; 37	CAL; 2	RCH; 1	DOV; 5	KAN; 4	CLT; 5	MEM; 1*	TEX; 2	PHO; 1*	HOM; 1	3rd	5111
2009	Carl Edwards	60	Ford	DAY; 2	CAL; 4	LVS; 2	BRI; 2	TEX; 18	NSH; 5	PHO; 33	TAL; 13	RCH; 2	DAR; 3	CLT; 10	DOV; 5	NSH; 3	KEN; 20	MLW; 1	NHA; 6	DAY; 3	CHI; 6	GTY; 3	IRP; 1*	IOW; 4	GLN; 3	MCH; 40	BRI; 2	CGV; 1	ATL; 7	RCH; 1	DOV; 5	KAN; 7	CAL; 3	CLT; 5	MEM; 6	TEX; 9	PHO; 1*	HOM; 2	2nd	5472
2010	Carl Edwards	60	Ford	DAY; 2	CAL; 4	LVS; 3	BRI; 4	NSH; 6	PHO; 6	TEX; 30	TAL; 35	RCH; 5	DAR; 6	DOV; 11	CLT; 9	NSH; 2	KEN; 2	ROA; 1*	NHA; 3	DAY; 11	CHI; 6	GTY; 1	IRP; 2	IOW; 10	GLN; 33	MCH; 2	BRI; 5	CGV; 20*	ATL; 3	RCH; 10	DOV; 3	KAN; 14	CAL; 4	CLT; 13	GTY; 5	TEX; 1	PHO; 1*	HOM; 6	5th	5194
2011	Carl Edwards	60	Ford	DAY; 29	PHO; 2	LVS; 6*	BRI; 7	CAL; 2	TEX; 1*	TAL; 17	NSH; 1*	RCH; 25	DAR; 20	DOV; 1*	IOW; 2	CLT; 2*	CHI; 2*	MCH; 1*		DAY; 14	KEN; 8	NHA; 34	NSH; 1*	IRP; 5	IOW; 2	GLN; 5	CGV; 7	BRI; 4	ATL; 1*	RCH; 2*	CHI; 2	DOV; 1*	KAN; 2	CLT; 1	TEX; 3*	PHO; 3	HOM; 3*		1st	1310
2011	Billy Johnson	60	Ford																ROA; 33								CGV; QL^{†}												1st	1310
2012	Trevor Bayne	60	Ford	DAY; 11	PHO; 7	LVS; 4	BRI; 8	CAL; 14	TEX	RCH	TAL	DAR	IOW	CLT	DOV	MCH	ROA	KEN	DAY	NHA	CHI	IND	IOW			BRI; 16	ATL												34th	318
2012	Carl Edwards	60	Ford																					GLN; 1															34th	318
2012	Billy Johnson	60	Ford																						CGV; 8														34th	318
2012	Travis Pastrana	60	Ford																									RCH; 17	CHI	KEN	DOV	CLT	KAN	TEX	PHO	HOM			34th	318
2013	Travis Pastrana	60	Ford	DAY; 10	PHO; 28	LVS; 10	BRI; 16	CAL; 13	TEX; 33	RCH; 9	TAL; 36	DAR; 28	CLT; 33	DOV; 15	IOW; 32	MCH; 15	ROA; 16	KEN; 15	DAY; 34	NHA; 16	CHI; 18	IND; 10	IOW; 27	GLN; 15	MOH; 31	BRI; 13	ATL; 17	RCH; 20	CHI; 27	KEN; 34	DOV; 22	KAN; 14	CLT; 24	TEX; 31	PHO; 21	HOM; 18			19th	751
2014	Chris Buescher	60	Ford	DAY; DNQ	PHO; 15	LVS; 9	BRI; 16	CAL; 14	TEX; 27	DAR; 34	RCH; 7	TAL; 2	IOW; 13	CLT; 9	DOV; 11	MCH; 10	ROA; 18	KEN; 18	DAY; 12	NHA; 5	CHI; 8	IND; 11	IOW; 14	GLN; 29	MOH; 1	BRI; 10	ATL; 13	RCH; 10	CHI; 12	KEN; 7	DOV; 4	KAN; 28	CLT; 6	TEX; 13	PHO; 12	HOM; 5			7th	1014
2015	Chris Buescher	60	Ford	DAY; 2	ATL; 4	LVS; 14	PHO; 14	CAL; 5	TEX; 9	BRI; 3	RCH; 20	TAL; 6	IOW; 1	CLT; 11	DOV; 1	MCH; 4	CHI; 5	DAY; 12	KEN; 11	NHA; 14	IND; 16	IOW; 13	GLN; 3	MOH; 4	BRI; 11*	ROA; 9	DAR; 5	RCH; 10	CHI; 7	KEN; 7	DOV; 8	CLT; 7	KAN; 6	TEX; 11	PHO; 13	HOM; 11			3rd	1190
2016	Trevor Bayne	60	Ford	DAY	ATL	LVS	PHO	CAL	TEX	BRI	RCH	TAL	DOV	CLT	POC	MCH	IOW	DAY	KEN	NHA	IND	IOW	GLN; 5	MOH															42nd	130
2016	Gray Gaulding	60	Ford																						BRI; 13	ROA	DAR	RCH; 13	CHI	KEN	DOV	CLT	KAN	TEX					42nd	130
2016	Ricky Stenhouse Jr.	60	Ford																																PHO; 3	HOM			42nd	130
2017	Ty Majeski	60	Ford	DAY	ATL	LVS	PHO	CAL	TEX	BRI	TAL	RCH	CLT	DOV	POC	MCH	IOW; 34	DAY	KEN	NHA	IND	IOW; 16	GLN	MOH	BRI	ROA	DAR	RCH	CHI	KEN	DOV	CLT	KAN	TEX	PHO	HOM; 10			45th	61
2018	Austin Cindric	60	Ford	DAY; 40		LVS; 34	PHO; 16	CAL; 28								MCH; 23			DAY; 33		NHA; 17		GLN; 13				DAR; 40												22nd	494
2018	Chase Briscoe	60	Ford		ATL; 15				TEX; 11		RCH; 26				POC; 38			CHI; 9				IOW; 10		MOH; 14	BRI; 34			IND; 9	LVS; 31			DOV; 19				HOM; 13			22nd	494
2018	Ty Majeski	60	Ford							BRI; 34		TAL; 37	DOV; 34	CLT; 22			IOW; 7			KEN; 27						ROA; 28				RCH; 34	CLT; 34		KAN; 8	TEX; 13	PHO; 18				22nd	494

=== Car No. 98 history ===
As part of the breakup of Yates Racing following the 2009 season, Jack Roush purchased the No. 98 Nationwide Series team. Paul Menard briefly drove for the team with sponsorship from Menards. Menard and his sponsor moved to Richard Childress Racing for 2011 and the team ceased operation.

==== Car No. 98 results ====
Year	Driver	No.	Make	1	2	3	4	5	6	7	8	9	10	11	12	13	14	15	16	17	18	19	20	21	22	23	24	25	26	27	28	29	30	31	32	33	34	35	Owners	Pts
2010	Paul Menard	98	Ford	DAY; 6	CAL; 19	LVS; 8	BRI; 11	NSH; 11	PHO; 7	TEX; 10	TAL; 8	RCH; 19	DAR; 10	DOV; 28	CLT; 18	NSH; 3	KEN; 32	ROA; 16	NHA; 9	DAY; 28	CHI; 11	GTY; 4	IRP; 9	IOW; 16	GLN; 17	MCH; 5	BRI; 13	CGV; 5	ATL; 9	RCH; 8	DOV; 7	KAN; 8	CAL; 12	CLT; 35	GTY; 9	TEX; 9	PHO; 13	HOM; 9	5th	4467
