= 2012 Supercar Challenge =

Car racing competition

Seasons
- ← 2011 2013 →

The 2012 Supercar Challenge powered by Dunlop was the twelfth Supercar Challenge season since it replaced the Supercar Cup in 2001, and the first one run under the Supercar Challenge banner since the 'Dutch' was dropped from the name. It began at Circuit Zolder on April 20 and ended at TT Circuit Assen on October 28.

== Calendar ==
The calendar was announced on 23 November 2011.

Round	Circuit	Date	Classes	Event	Notes
1	Circuit Zolder, Belgium	20–22 April	All		Supporting FIA GT1 Zolder round. Super GT and GT race separate from Supersport and Sport 1 & 2.
2	Circuit Zandvoort, Netherlands	4–6 May	Super GT and GT	ADAC Masters Weekend	
3	Nürburgring, Germany	24–27 May	All	AvD Eurorace Nürburgring	Super GT and GT race separate from Supersport and Sport 1 & 2.
4	Spa-Francorchamps, Belgium	22–24 June	Super GT, GT, GTB and Supersport	Spa Eurorace	
5	Circuit Zolder, Belgium	6–8 July	All	Zolder Superprix	Super GT and GT race separate from Supersport and Sport 1 & 2.
6	TT Circuit Assen, Netherlands	3–5 August	All	Gamma Racing Day	Super GT and GT race separate from Supersport and Sport 1 & 2.
7	Circuit Zandvoort, Netherlands	24–26 August	Super GT, GT and GTB		Supporting Deutsche Tourenwagen Masters
8	Circuit Zolder, Belgium	6–9 September	Supersport, Sport 1 & 2	Zolder Superprix	Supporting the 2012 24 Hours of Zolder
9	Circuit Zandvoort, Netherlands	21–23 September	Supersport, Sport 1 & 2		
10	Spa-Francorchamps, Belgium	13–14 October	Super GT, GT, GTB, Supersport and Sport 1	Racing Festival	
11	TT Circuit Assen, Netherlands	26–28 October	All	Dunlop Finale Races	Super GT, GT and GTB race separate from Supersport, Sport 1 & 2.

== Entry list ==
=== Super GT, GT and GTB ===
Team	Car	No.	Drivers	Class	Rounds
(Netherlands) Mad & Daring Racing	Porsche 997 GT3 RSR	101	(Netherlands) Nicky Pastorelli	SGT	10
(Netherlands) Mad & Daring Racing	Porsche 997 GT3 RSR	101	(Netherlands) Rick Abresch	SGT	10
(Netherlands) Mad & Daring Racing	Chevrolet Corvette C6.R GT1	101	(Netherlands) Rick Abresch	SGT	1–3, 5, 7, 11
(Netherlands) Mad & Daring Racing	Chevrolet Corvette C6.R GT1	101	(Netherlands) Diederik Sijthoff	SGT	1–2, 7, 11
(Netherlands) Mad & Daring Racing	Chevrolet Corvette C6.R GT1	127	(Netherlands) Danny Werkman	SGT	1–2, 4–5, 7
(Netherlands) Mad & Daring Racing	Chevrolet Corvette C6.R GT1	127	(Netherlands) Bob Sijthoff	SGT	3
(Netherlands) Mad & Daring Racing	Chevrolet Corvette C6.R GT1	127	(Netherlands) Rick Abresch	SGT	4
(Netherlands) Mad & Daring Racing	Chevrolet Corvette C6.R GT1	127	(Netherlands) Diederik Sijthoff	SGT	7
(Netherlands) Mad & Daring Racing	Chevrolet Corvette C6.R GT1	128	(Netherlands) Alex van 't Hoff	SGT	1–5, 7, 10–11
(Netherlands) Mad & Daring Racing	Chevrolet Corvette C6.R GT1	128	(Netherlands) Diederik Sijthoff	SGT	3–5, 10
(Netherlands) Mad & Daring Racing	Opel Omega V8Star	281	(Netherlands) Max Braams	GT	2
(Netherlands) Mad & Daring Racing	Opel Omega V8Star	281	(Netherlands) Nicky Pastorelli	GT	2
(Netherlands) Marcos Racing International	Marcos Mantara LM600	103	(Netherlands) Cor Euser	SGT	5
(Netherlands) Speedtec Motorsport	Viper SRT10 GT2	104	(Netherlands) Robert de Graaff	SGT	All
(Netherlands) Speedtec Motorsport	Viper SRT10 GT2	104	(Netherlands) Phillipe Ribbens	SGT	All
(Netherlands) Speedtec Motorsport	Viper SRT10 GT2	118	(Netherlands) Bert de Heus	SGT	2
(Netherlands) Speedtec Motorsport	Viper SRT10 GT2	218	(Netherlands) Bert de Heus	GT	5
(Netherlands) Speedtec Motorsport	BMW Z4 Zilhouette	148	(Netherlands) Robert de Graaff	GT	7 (R2)
(Netherlands) Speedtec Motorsport	BMW Z4 Zilhouette	148	(Netherlands) Phillipe Ribbens	GT	7 (R2)
(Netherlands) RSracing	Porsche 911 GT2	105	(Netherlands) René Snel	SGT	6
(Netherlands) Marchal Racing	Aston Martin DBRS9	107	(Netherlands) Ron Marchal	SGT	4
(Netherlands) Marchal Racing	Aston Martin DBRS9	207	(Netherlands) Ron Marchal	GT	5
(Netherlands) Brass Racing	Viper SRT10 GT3	108	(Belgium) Jerry de Weerdt	SGT	1
(Netherlands) Brass Racing	Viper SRT10 GT3	228	(Belgium) Jerry de Weerdt	GT	4–5
(United Kingdom) APEX Motorsport	McLaren MP4-12C GT3	112	(United Kingdom) Glynn Geddie	SGT	10–11
(United Kingdom) APEX Motorsport	McLaren MP4-12C GT3	112	(United Kingdom) Jim Geddie	SGT	10–11
(Netherlands) Van Berlo Racing	Viper SRT10 GT3	114	(Netherlands) Barry Maessen	SGT	1
(Netherlands) Van Berlo Racing	Viper SRT10 GT3	214	(Netherlands) Barry Maessen	GT	2–7, 10–11
(Netherlands) Van Berlo Racing	Ford Mondeo MW V8	203	(Netherlands) Jacky van der Ende	GT	1–2
(Netherlands) Van Berlo Racing	Ford Mondeo MW V8	203	(Netherlands) Nelson van der Pol	GT	1–2
(Netherlands) Van Berlo Racing	Ford Mondeo MW V8	203	(Netherlands) Jacky van der Ende	GTB	3–7, 10–11
(Netherlands) Van Berlo Racing	Ford Mondeo MW V8	203	(Netherlands) Nelson van der Pol	GTB	3–7, 10–11
(Netherlands) Storm-Tag Point Racing	BMW Z4 GT3	115	(Netherlands) Jan Storm	SGT	1–4, 6–7, 10–11
(Netherlands) Storm-Tag Point Racing	BMW Z4 GT3	115	(Netherlands) Niels Bouwhuis	SGT	1
(Netherlands) DB Motorsport	BMW Z4 GT3	116	(Netherlands) Jeroen den Boer	SGT	11
(Netherlands) Team RaceArt	Chevrolet Corvette C5-R	117	(Netherlands) Nol Köhler	SGT	All
(Netherlands) Team RaceArt	Chevrolet Corvette C5-R	117	(Netherlands) Ardi van der Hoek	SGT	1–7
(Netherlands) Team RaceArt	Chevrolet Corvette C5-R	117	(Netherlands) Carlo Kuijer	SGT	10–11
(Netherlands) Team RaceArt	BMW Z4 GT3	163	(Netherlands) Roger Grouwels	SGT	3
(Netherlands) Team RaceArt	Mosler MT900R GT3	177	(Netherlands) Milko Tas	SGT	1–2, 4–5, 7
(Netherlands) Team RaceArt	Mosler MT900R GT3	177	(Netherlands) Niels Bouwhuis	SGT	1, 3
(Netherlands) Team RaceArt	Mosler MT900R GT3	177	(Netherlands) Roger Grouwels	SGT	2, 4–5, 7, 10–11
(Netherlands) Team RaceArt	Radical SR8	177	(Netherlands) Roger Grouwels	SGT	6
(Netherlands) Team RaceArt	Radical SR8	177	(Netherlands) Milko Tas	SGT	6
(Netherlands) Team RaceArt	Porsche 997 GT3 Cup	215	(Netherlands) Steve Matthijssen	GTB	3–7, 10
(Netherlands) Team RaceArt	Porsche 997 GT3 Cup	215	(Netherlands) Steve Matthijssen	GT	1–2
(Netherlands) Team RaceArt	Porsche 997 GT3 Cup	215	(Netherlands) Erol Ertan	GT	1–2
(Netherlands) Team RaceArt	Porsche 997 GT3 Cup	216	(Netherlands) Erol Ertan	GTB	3–7, 10–11
(Netherlands) Team RaceArt	Porsche 997 GT3 Cup	216	(Netherlands) Rob Severs	GTB	5
(Netherlands) Team RaceArt	Porsche 997 GT3 Cup	216	(Netherlands) Rob Frijns	GTB	6
(United Kingdom) NCK Motorsport	Marcos LM600	120	(France) Pierre-Etienne Bordet	SGT	1–2
(United Kingdom) NCK Motorsport	Marcos LM600	120	(France) Pierre-Etienne Bordet	GT	3, 5
(United Kingdom) NCK Motorsport	Marcos LM600	220	(France) Pierre-Etienne Bordet	GT	4, 6
(Belgium) Delahaye Racing Team	Volvo S60 Silhouette	220	(France) Pierre-Etienne Bordet	GT	7, 10
(Netherlands) DVB Racing	Dodge Viper GTS-R	121	(Belgium) Wim Lumbeeck	SGT	1–2, 5, 7, 10–11
(Netherlands) DVB Racing	Dodge Viper GTS-R	121	(Netherlands) Wim Moonen	SGT	1–2
(Netherlands) DVB Racing	Dodge Viper GTS-R	121	(Netherlands) Rob Kamphues	SGT	7, 11
(United Kingdom) CNC Heads Racing	Opel Astra DTM	123	(United Kingdom) Ric Wood	SGT	1
(Netherlands) Veka Racing	Ferrari F430 GT2	129	(Belgium) Bert Longin	SGT	1–7, 11
(Netherlands) Veka Racing	Ferrari F430 GT2	129	(Belgium) Franz Lamot	SGT	1–3, 5–7, 10–11
(Netherlands) Veka Racing	Ferrari F430 GT2	129	(Belgium) Koen Wauters	SGT	10
(Netherlands) Veka Racing	Ferrari F430 GT2	132	(Netherlands) Jan Versluis	SGT	All
(Netherlands) Veka Racing	Ferrari 458 GT2	130	(Netherlands) Peter Versluis	SGT	1–4, 6–7, 10–11
(Netherlands) Veka Racing	Ferrari 458 GT2	130	(Netherlands) Yelmer Buurman	SGT	1
(Netherlands) FE Racing	Chevrolet Corvette Z06.R GT3	137	(Netherlands) Wolf Nathan	SGT	10–11
(Netherlands) FE Racing	Chevrolet Corvette Z06.R GT3	137	(Netherlands) Jaap van Lagen	SGT	10–11
(Netherlands) FE Racing	Opel Omega V8Star	201	(Netherlands) Wolf Nathan	GT	1, 3–4
(Netherlands) FE Racing	Opel Omega V8Star	201	(Netherlands) Jaap van Lagen	GT	1, 3–4
(Belgium) Scuderia Monza	Ferrari F430 GT3	138	(Belgium) Frank Thiers	SGT	1
(Belgium) Scuderia Monza	Ferrari F430 GT3	138	(Belgium) Hans Thiers	SGT	1
Race 4 Slovakia (Note: No. 145 was entered as Race 4 Slovakia in rounds 1 & 2. It was entered as Praga Racing for round 4.) (Czech Republic) Praga Racing	Praga R4S	145	(Slovakia) Leonard Hrobarek	SGT	1–2
Race 4 Slovakia (Czech Republic) Praga Racing	Praga R4S	145	(Austria) Simon Wagner	SGT	1, 4
Race 4 Slovakia (Czech Republic) Praga Racing	Praga R4S	145	(Netherlands) Danny van Dongen	SGT	2, 4
(Netherlands) BlueBerry Racing	Mosler MT900R GT3	172	(Netherlands) Berry van Elk	SGT	3
(Netherlands) BlueBerry Racing	Mosler MT900R GT3	172	(Netherlands) Dick van Elk	SGT	3
(Netherlands) BlueBerry Racing	Mosler MT900R GT3	173	(Netherlands) Berry van Elk	SGT	4–7, 10–11
(Netherlands) BlueBerry Racing	Praga R4S	173	(Netherlands) Berry van Elk	SGT	1
(United Kingdom) Rollcentre Racing	Mosler MT900R GT3	175	(Austria) Simon Wagner	SGT	3
(United Kingdom) Rollcentre Racing	Mosler MT900R GT3	175	(Slovakia) Leonard Hrobārek	SGT	3 (R1)
(United Kingdom) Rollcentre Racing	Mosler MT900R GT3	175	(United Kingdom) Martin Short	SGT	3 (R2)
(Netherlands) JR Motorsport	BMW M3 Silhouette	205	(Netherlands) Henk Thuis	GT	1–5, 7, 10–11
(Netherlands) JR Motorsport	BMW M3 Silhouette	205	(Netherlands) Pim van Riet	GT	1–5, 7, 10–11
(Netherlands) JR Motorsport	BMW M3 Silhouette	205	(Netherlands) Henk Thuis	GTB	6
(Netherlands) JR Motorsport	BMW M3 Silhouette	206	(Belgium) Steve Vanbellingen	GT	1–5, 7, 10–11
(Netherlands) JR Motorsport	BMW M3 Silhouette	206	(Belgium) Bert Redant	GT	1–5, 7, 10
(Netherlands) Lammertink Racing	Porsche 997 GT3 Cup	208	(Netherlands) Charlie Frijns	GT	1–2
(Netherlands) Lammertink Racing	Porsche 997 GT3 Cup	208	(Netherlands) René Wijnen	GT	1–2
(Netherlands) Lammertink Racing	Porsche 997 GT3 Cup	208	(Netherlands) Charlie Frijns	GTB	3–7, 10–11
(Netherlands) Lammertink Racing	Porsche 997 GT3 Cup	208	(Netherlands) René Wijnen	GTB	3–7, 10–11
(Netherlands) Lammertink Racing	Porsche 997 GT3 Cup	243	(Netherlands) Daan Meijer	GTB	3–7, 10–11
(Netherlands) Lammertink Racing	Porsche 997 GT3 Cup	243	(Netherlands) Mark van der Aa	GTB	11
(Netherlands) Topper Team	Porsche 997 GT3 Cup	209	(Netherlands) Dirk Schulz	GT	1–2
(Netherlands) Topper Team	Porsche 997 GT3 Cup	209	(Netherlands) Dirk Schulz	GTB	3–7, 10–11
(Netherlands) Topper Team	Porsche 997 GT3 Cup	209	(Netherlands) Bob Sijthoff	GTB	4
(Belgium) Van Herck Racing	Mazda 3	210	(Belgium) Werner van Herck	GT	1–2
(Belgium) Van Herck Racing	Mazda 3	210	(Belgium) Werner van Herck	GTB	4–7, 10–11
(Netherlands) Autoblokland.nl	Porsche 996 GT3 RSR	211	(Netherlands) Gerard de Jong	GT	10
(Netherlands) Racinginfo.com	Marcos Mantis	212	(Netherlands) Rob Knook	GT	1
(Netherlands) Racinginfo.com	Marcos Mantis	212	(Netherlands) Rob Knook	GTB	4
(Netherlands) Divitec Racing	Divitec SF11	221	(Netherlands) Carlo Kuijer	GT	1
(Netherlands) Divitec Racing	Divitec SF11	221	(Netherlands) Carlo Kuijer	GTB	3–5
(Portugal) Algarve Pro Racing	Renault Mégane Trophy	225	(United Kingdom) Michael Munemann	GT	4, 7
(Portugal) Algarve Pro Racing	Renault Mégane Trophy	225	(Netherlands) Nicky Catsburg	GT	4
(Netherlands) Van der Kooi Lotus Racing	Lotus Exige GT3	226	(Netherlands) Jan van der Kooi	GT	All
(Netherlands) GT3 Racing Ingewaal	Porsche 996 GT3 RSR	229	(Netherlands) Jack Rozendaal	GT	1, 6
(Germany) AFK Motorsport	Renault Mégane Trophy	230	(Germany) Oliver Freymuth	GT	10
(United Kingdom) Backdraft Motorsport	Lamborghini Gallardo	231	(United Kingdom) Simon Atkinson	GT	4–6, 10–11
(United Kingdom) Backdraft Motorsport	Lamborghini Gallardo	232	(United Kingdom) Fiona James	GT	1–2, 4
(Netherlands) V-Max Racing	BMW M3 E46	233	(Netherlands) Ronald van Loon	GTB	7
(United Kingdom) Balfe Motorsport	Ferrari 458 Challenge	235	(United Kingdom) Shaun Balfe	GT	10
(Netherlands) DDG Motorsports	Aston Martin Vantage	236	(Netherlands) Wilfred Herder	GT	1–2
(Netherlands) DDG Motorsports	Aston Martin Vantage	236	(Netherlands) Wilfred Herder	GTB	3–4, 6–7, 10–11
(Netherlands) DDG Motorsports	Aston Martin Vantage	237	(Netherlands) Kees Kreijne	GT	1–2
(Netherlands) DDG Motorsports	Aston Martin Vantage	237	(Netherlands) Kees Kreijne	GTB	3–7, 10–11
(Netherlands) Moritz Racing	Marcos Mantis	240	(Netherlands) Bert Moritz	GTB	7
(Netherlands) Moritz Racing	Marcos Mantis	240	(Netherlands) Patrick Moritz	GTB	7
(United Kingdom) Team Webb	BMW M3 E46 GTR	247	(United Kingdom) James Webb	GTB	10
(United Kingdom) Team Webb	BMW M3 E46 GTR	247	(United Kingdom) Tom Webb	GTB	10

Icon	Class
SGT	Super GT class
GT	GT class
GTB	GTB class

=== Supersport, Sport 1 and Sport 2 ===
Team	Car	No.	Drivers	Class	Rounds
(Netherlands) Team Riwal Racing	SEAT León Supercopa	301	(Netherlands) Ferry Monster	SS	All
(Netherlands) Team Riwal Racing	SEAT León Supercopa	301	(Netherlands) Robin Monster	SS	All
(Netherlands) European Staffing Racing	BMW M3 E46 GTR	303	(Netherlands) Koen Bogaerts	SS	All
(Netherlands) European Staffing Racing	BMW M3 E46 GTR	303	(Netherlands) Pieter van Soelen	SS	All
(Netherlands) JR Motorsport	BMW M3 E92	304	(Netherlands) Ruud Olij	SS	10
(Netherlands) JR Motorsport	BMW M3 E92	308	(Netherlands) Ted van Vliet	SS	1, 3–5, 9, 11
(Netherlands) JR Motorsport	BMW M3 E92	308	(Netherlands) Bert van der Zweerde	SS	1, 4, 6, 9, 11
(Netherlands) JR Motorsport	BMW M3 E92	308	(Netherlands) Pim van Riet	SS	5–6
(Netherlands) JR Motorsport	BMW M3 E92	308	(Netherlands) Toon van de Haterd	SS	5
(Netherlands) JR Motorsport	BMW M3 E92	308	(Netherlands) Marco Poland	SS	6
(Netherlands) JR Motorsport	BMW 132i	309	(Netherlands) Bas Schouten	SS	10
(Netherlands) JR Motorsport	BMW 132i	309	(Netherlands) Bert van der Zweerde	SS	10
(Netherlands) JR Motorsport	BMW M3 E36	410	(Netherlands) Laurens Gooshouwer	S1	3, 6
(Netherlands) JR Motorsport	BMW M3 E36	410	(Netherlands) Alfred Möller	S1	6
(Netherlands) JR Motorsport	BMW M3 E36	421	(Netherlands) Jan-Jaap van Dalen	S1	1
(Netherlands) Ferry Monster Autosport	SEAT León Supercopa	306	(Netherlands) Marc Rooker	SS	3–4, 6
(Netherlands) Ferry Monster Autosport	SEAT León Supercopa	306	(Russia) Lev Fridman	SS	6
(Netherlands) Powermotorsports	BMW 132i	307	(Netherlands) Peter Hoevenaars	SS	All
(Netherlands) Powermotorsports	BMW 130i	407	(Netherlands) John van der Voort	S1	All
(Netherlands) Powermotorsports	BMW 130i	407	(Netherlands) Millko Tas	S1	1 (R2)
(Netherlands) Powermotorsports	BMW 130i	407	(Netherlands) Priscilla Speelman	S1	3, 5–6, 8–11
(Belgium) Deldiche Racing	Lotus 2-Eleven GT4	311	(Belgium) Luc de Cock	SS	1, 3–6, 8, 10
(Germany) Dörr Motorsport	KTM X-Bow	312	(Netherlands) Stéphane Kox	SS	9
(Germany) Dörr Motorsport	KTM X-Bow	312	(Netherlands) Dennis Retera	SS	9
(Germany) Dörr Motorsport	Mini Cooper S	512	(Netherlands) Peter Kox	S2	8
(Germany) Dörr Motorsport	Mini Cooper S	512	(Netherlands) Stéphane Kox	S2	8
(Belgium) AB Racing Team	Saker Rapx	314	(Belgium) Wim Meulders	SS	1, 3–5
(Belgium) AB Racing Team	Saker Rapx	314	(Belgium) Bert Longin	SS	1, 3, 5
(United Kingdom) Keith Butcher Racing	Ginetta G50 GT4	315	(United Kingdom) Keith Butcher	SS	5
(Netherlands) Brax Racing	SEAT León Supercopa	316	(Netherlands) Remco de Beus	SS	1, 3–6, 9–10
(Netherlands) Brax Racing	SEAT León Supercopa	316	(Netherlands) Jacky van der Ende	SS	5
(Netherlands) Speedtec Motorsport	BMW Z4 Zilhouette	318	(Netherlands) Nico van Vliet	SS	All
(Netherlands) Speedtec Motorsport	BMW Z4 Zilhouette	318	(Netherlands) Peter van Vliet	SS	All
(Netherlands) Speedtec Motorsport	BMW Z4 Zilhouette	319	(Netherlands) Helmert-Jan van der Slik	SS	3–6, 8–9, 11
(Netherlands) Speedtec Motorsport	BMW Z4 Zilhouette	319	(Netherlands) Leo van der Eijk	SS	3–6, 8
(Netherlands) Speedtec Motorsport	BMW Z4 Zilhouette	319	(Netherlands) Jan Lammers	SS	5 (R1)
(Netherlands) Speedtec Motorsport	BMW Z4 Zilhouette	319	(Netherlands) Marcel ter Horst	SS	9
(Netherlands) Speedtec Motorsport	BMW Z4 Zilhouette	319	(Netherlands) Bas Schouten	SS	11
(Netherlands) Gravity Racing	SEAT León Supercopa	321	(Netherlands) Marcel Norbart	SS	4, 10
(Belgium) Spork Racing Team	SEAT León Supercopa	323	(Belgium) Jimmy Adriaenssens	SS	All
(Belgium) Spork Racing Team	SEAT León Supercopa	323	(United Kingdom) David Nye	SS	All
(Belgium) Spork Racing Team	SEAT León Supercopa	324	(Belgium) Wim De Graef	SS	1, 4
(Belgium) Spork Racing Team	SEAT León Supercopa	324	(Belgium) Kris van Kelst	SS	1
(Belgium) Spork Racing Team	SEAT León Supercopa	324	(Belgium) Jimmy Adriaenssens	SS	4
(Belgium) Spork Racing Team	SEAT León Supercopa	325	(Belgium) Jonas De Kimpe	SS	All
(Belgium) Spork Racing Team	SEAT León Supercopa	325	(Belgium) Vincent van Paemel	SS	1, 3–6, 9–11
(Netherlands) PS Autosport	BMW M3 GT4	327	(Netherlands) Peter Stox	SS	1, 3–6, 8, 10–11
(Netherlands) PS Autosport	BMW M3 GT4	327	(Netherlands) Andre de Vries	SS	3–6, 8, 10–11
(Netherlands) PS Autosport	BMW M3 GT4	334	(Netherlands) Marcel van Rijswick	SS	1, 3–5
(Netherlands) PS Autosport	BMW M3 GT4	334	(Netherlands) Claude L'Ortye	SS	1, 3–4
(Netherlands) PS Autosport	BMW M3 GT4	334	(Netherlands) Andre de Vries	SS	5
(Netherlands) PS Autosport	BMW 123d	511	(Netherlands) Carlijn Bergsma	S2	6
(Netherlands) PS Autosport	BMW 123d	511	(Netherlands) Claude L'Ortye	S2	6
(Belgium) Traxx Racing Team	SEAT León Supercopa	329	(Belgium) Bart van den Broeck	SS	1, 3–5, 8–11
(Belgium) Traxx Racing Team	SEAT León Supercopa	329	(Belgium) Chris Voet	SS	1, 3–5, 8–11
(Netherlands) Braspenning Racing	BMW M3 E46 GTR	332	(Netherlands) Ron Braspenning	SS	3
(Netherlands) Braspenning Racing	BMW M3 E46 GTR	332	(Netherlands) Iman van Schelven	SS	3
(Netherlands) Braspenning Racing	BMW E46 Compact	430	(Netherlands) Eline Braspenning	S1	3, 6
(Netherlands) Braspenning Racing	BMW E46 Compact	430	(Netherlands) Ron Braspenning	S1	6
(Netherlands) BlueBerry Racing	BMW M3 E46	333	(Netherlands) Ronald van Loon	SS	1, 3–6, 10–11
(Netherlands) Arie Kandt	Ford Mondeo MW V6	337	(Netherlands) Arie Kandt	SS	11
(Belgium) MTE Racing	BMW 1 Series Zilhouette	338	(Belgium) Pascal Nelissen-Grade	SS	5, 10
(Belgium) MTE Racing	BMW 1 Series Zilhouette	338	(Belgium) Patrick Poncelet	SS	5, 10
(Belgium) MTE Racing	BMW 1 Series Zilhouette	338	(Belgium) Michael Damoiseaux	SS	8
(Belgium) MTE Racing	BMW 1 Series Zilhouette	338	(Belgium) Pierre-Yves Rosoux	SS	8
(Netherlands) Tom Koop Racing	BMW M3 E46 GTR	339	(Netherlands) Tom Koop	SS	10
(Netherlands) MadrettoR Racing	BMW Z4	340	(Netherlands) Bob Herber	SS	All
(Netherlands) MadrettoR Racing	BMW Z4	340	(Netherlands) Martin Lanting	SS	1, 3–6, 9–11
(Belgium) RMR Racing	KTM X-Bow	341	(Belgium) Jimmy Adriaenssens	SS	9
(Belgium) RMR Racing	KTM X-Bow	341	(Belgium) Rudy Lemmens	SS	9
(Netherlands) DVB Racing	Ginetta G50 GT4	342	(United Kingdom) Richard Fearns	SS	1, 3, 6
(Netherlands) DVB Racing	Ginetta G55 GT4	342	(United Kingdom) Richard Fearns	SS	5
(Netherlands) Lammertink Racing	Porsche 996 GT3 Cup	343	(Netherlands) Daan Meijer	SS	1, 6
(Belgium) Qvick Motors Racing	BMW M3 E92	346	(France) Philippe Bonnel	SS	10
(Belgium) Qvick Motors Racing	BMW M3 E92	346	(Belgium) Bruno Vermote	SS	10
(United Kingdom) Team Webb	BMW M3 E46 GTR	347	(United Kingdom) Martin Webb	SS	4, 10
(Netherlands) Cor Euser Racing	Lotus Evora GT4	350	(Netherlands) Cor Euser	SS	10
(Netherlands) AT Motorsport	Ford Focus BRL Light	351	(Netherlands) Léo Kurstjens	SS	1, 3, 5–6, 8–11
(Netherlands) AT Motorsport	Ford Focus BRL Light	505	(Netherlands) Kim Troeyen	S2	All
(Netherlands) Kuijpers Racing	Ford Mondeo MW V6	360	(Netherlands) Dick van der Donk	SS	All
(Belgium) Vankets Motorsport	SEAT León Supercopa	365	(Belgium) Geoffrey Vankets	SS	1, 3, 6
(Belgium) Vankets Motorsport	SEAT León Supercopa	365	(Netherlands) Martin van den Berge	SS	3
(Netherlands) Bijl Motorsport	SEAT León Supercopa	368	(Netherlands) Jasper Bijl	SS	3–4, 8–11
(Netherlands) Bijl Motorsport	SEAT León Supercopa	368	(Netherlands) Robert Bijl	SS	3–4, 8–11
(Netherlands) ABW Racing	Lotus Exige 240 Cup	369	(Netherlands) Aart Bosman	SS	1, 3–6, 8, 11
(Netherlands) Johan Kraan Motorsport	Saker GT	373	(Netherlands) Henk Thijssen	SS	6
(Netherlands) Johan Kraan Motorsport	Saker GT	373	(Netherlands) Ton Verkoelen	SS	6
(United Kingdom) Toleman Motorsport	Mitsubishi Lancer Evo	384	(United Kingdom) Gary Furst	SS	5
(United Kingdom) Krayem Racing	Ginetta G50 GT4	388	(United Kingdom) David Krayem	SS	1, 4–6, 8–11
(Netherlands) Team TDM	Lotus Exige Cup	402	(France) Guillaume Schulz	S1	1, 3, 5–6
(Netherlands) Madeno Racing	Renault Clio RS	410	(Netherlands) Stephan Polderman	S1	1
(Netherlands) Madeno Racing	Renault Clio RS	410	(Netherlands) René Steenmetz	S1	1
(Netherlands) LZ Racing	BMW M3 E36	413	(Netherlands) Leon Zappeij	S1	1, 3, 5, 8–10
(Netherlands) Van den Munckhof Racing	Ford Focus BRL Light	422	(Netherlands) Eric van den Munckhof	S1	All
(Netherlands) Van Berlo Racing	Ford Focus BRL Light	423	(Netherlands) Marcel van Berlo	S1	3 5–6, 8, 11
(Netherlands) Van der Kooi Lotus Racing	Lotus Exige Cup	426	(Netherlands) Harold Wisselink	S1	1, 3, 6, 9
(Netherlands) Van der Kooi Lotus Racing	Lotus Exige Cup	427	(United Kingdom) Jeremy Adams	S1	10–11
(Netherlands) Van der Kooi Lotus Racing	Lotus Exige Cup	427	(Netherlands) Toon Rutgers	S1	10–11
(Netherlands) Van der Kooi Lotus Racing	Lotus Exige 192	506	(United Kingdom) Jeremy Adams	S2	1, 3, 6, 9, 11
(Netherlands) Van der Kooi Lotus Racing	Lotus Exige 192	506	(Netherlands) Toon Rutgers	S2	1, 6, 8–9, 11
(Netherlands) Van der Kooi Lotus Racing	Lotus Exige 192	525	(Netherlands) Ben Verwoerdt	S2	6
(Netherlands) Horeca Beheer Racing	Ford Mustang GT	428	(Netherlands) Eddy Lambeck	S1	11
(Netherlands) Horeca Beheer Racing	Ford Mustang GT	428	(Netherlands) Auke Wiegers	S1	11
(Netherlands) KH Racing	BMW M3 E36 Compact	431	(Netherlands) Kevin van Eldik	S1	5–6, 9
(Netherlands) KH Racing	BMW M3 E36 Compact	431	(Netherlands) Jacky Ekkelboom	S1	5–6
(Netherlands) KH Racing	BMW M3 E36 Compact	431	(Netherlands) Joost van de Wiel	S1	9
(Netherlands) YURT Motorsport by Day V Tec	BMW 130i	432	(Netherlands) Tim Hummel	S1	9–11
(Netherlands) YURT Motorsport by Day V Tec	BMW 130i	433	(Netherlands) Wesley Caransa	S1	9–11
(Netherlands) YURT Motorsport by Day V Tec	BMW 130i	436	(Netherlands) Maurits Caransa	S1	9–11
(Netherlands) Verhagen Racing	Honda S2000	434	(Netherlands) Michael Verhagen	S1	All
(Ukraine) Chayka Racing	BMW E46 320i	448	(Ukraine) Sergii Pustovoitenko	S1	1, 3
(Ukraine) Chayka Racing	BMW E46 320i	448	(Ukraine) Leonid Protasov	S1	1
(Ukraine) Chayka Racing	BMW E46 320i	449	(Ukraine) Leonid Protasov	S1	3
(Ukraine) Chayka Racing	BMW E46 320i	449	(Ukraine) Irina Protasova	S1	1, 3
(Ukraine) Chayka Racing	BMW E46 320i	449	(Ukraine) Igor Denisov	S1	1
(Ukraine) Chayka Racing	BMW E46 320i	449	(Ukraine) Mark Kramerenko	S1	8, 10
(Ukraine) Chayka Racing	BMW E46 320i	449	(Ukraine) Artem Shabazov	S1	8, 10
(Netherlands) Spirit Racing	Renault Clio Cup RS	501	(Netherlands) Rob Nieman	S2	All
(Netherlands) Spirit Racing	Renault Clio Cup RS	502	(Netherlands) Frank Bédorf	S2	All
(Netherlands) Spirit Racing	Renault Clio Cup RS	502	(Netherlands) Machiel Kars	S2	All
(Netherlands) Been Racing	Renault Clio RS	504	(Netherlands) Nico Been	S2	1, 3, 5–6, 8, 11
(Netherlands) Las Moras Racing Team	BMW 120d	508	(Netherlands) Liesette Braams	S2	5
(Netherlands) Race Service Simonis	Renault Clio RS	509	(Netherlands) Patrick Simonis	S2	5
(Netherlands) Race Service Simonis	Renault Clio RS	510	(Netherlands) Pascal Ehlert	S2	5, 11
(Netherlands) Race Service Simonis	Renault Clio RS	510	(Netherlands) Giel van Lierop	S2	11
(Netherlands) Zilhouette Cup	BMW Z4 Zilhouette	516	(Netherlands) Bas de Jong	S2	6
(Netherlands) Zilhouette Cup	BMW Z4 Zilhouette	516	(Netherlands) Roelof Peter van der Velde	S2	6
(Netherlands) Zilhouette Cup	BMW Z4 Zilhouette	517	(Netherlands) Sipke Bijzitter	S2	6
(Netherlands) Zilhouette Cup	BMW Z4 Zilhouette	517	(Netherlands) Martin van Luik	S2	6

Icon	Class
SS	Supersport class
S1	Sport 1 class
S2	Sport 2 class

== Race results ==
Round		Circuit	Super GT Winning Car	GT Winning Car	GTB Winning Car	Supersport Winning Car	Sport 1 Winning Car	Sport 2 Winning Car
Round		Circuit	Super GT Winning Drivers	GT Winning Drivers	GTB Winning Drivers	Supersport Winning Drivers	Sport 1 Winning Drivers	Sport 2 Winning Drivers
1	R1	(Belgium) Zolder	(Netherlands) No. 130 Veka Racing	(Netherlands) No. 237 DDG Motorsports	Did not participate	(Netherlands) No. 303 European Staffing Racing	(Netherlands) No. 422 Van den Munckhof Racing	(Netherlands) No. 506 Van der Kooi Lotus Racing
1	R1	(Belgium) Zolder	(Netherlands) Peter Versluis (Netherlands) Yelmer Buurman	(Netherlands) Kees Kreijne	Did not participate	(Netherlands) Koen Bogaerts (Netherlands) Pieter van Soelen	(Netherlands) Eric van den Munckhof	(United Kingdom) Jeremy Adams (Netherlands) Toon Rutgers
1	R2	(Belgium) Zolder	(Netherlands) No. 117 RaceArt	(Netherlands) No. 226 Van der Kooi Lotus Racing	Did not participate	(Netherlands) No. 307 Powermotorsports	(Netherlands) No. 402 Team TDM	(Netherlands) No. 506 Van der Kooi Lotus Racing
1	R2	(Belgium) Zolder	(Netherlands) Nol Köhler (Netherlands) Ardi van der Hoek	(Netherlands) Jan van der Kooi	Did not participate	(Netherlands) Peter Hoevenaars	(France) Guillaume Schulz	(United Kingdom) Jeremy Adams (Netherlands) Toon Rutgers
2	R1	(Netherlands) Zandvoort	(Netherlands) No. 101 Mad & Daring Racing	(Netherlands) No. 205 JR Motorsport	Did not participate	Did not participate	Did not participate	Did not participate
2	R1	(Netherlands) Zandvoort	(Netherlands) Rick Abresch (Netherlands) Diederik Sijthoff	(Netherlands) Henk Thuis (Netherlands) Pim van Riet	Did not participate	Did not participate	Did not participate	Did not participate
2	R2	(Netherlands) Zandvoort	(Netherlands) No. 101 Mad & Daring Racing	(Netherlands) No. 281 Mad & Daring Racing	Did not participate	Did not participate	Did not participate	Did not participate
2	R2	(Netherlands) Zandvoort	(Netherlands) Rick Abresch (Netherlands) Diederik Sijthoff	(Netherlands) Max Braams (Netherlands) Nicky Pastorelli	Did not participate	Did not participate	Did not participate	Did not participate
3	R1	(Germany) Nürburgring	(Netherlands) No. 117 RaceArt	(Netherlands) No. 214 Van Berlo Racing	(Netherlands) No. 243 Lammertink Racing	(Netherlands) No. 303 European Staffing Racing	(Netherlands) No. 402 Team TDM	(Netherlands) No. 501 Spirit Racing
3	R1	(Germany) Nürburgring	(Netherlands) Nol Köhler (Netherlands) Ardi van der Hoek	(Netherlands) Barry Maessen	(Netherlands) Daan Meijer	(Netherlands) Koen Bogaerts (Netherlands) Pieter van Soelen	(France) Guillaume Schulz	(Netherlands) Rob Nieman
3	R2	(Germany) Nürburgring	(Netherlands) No. 130 Veka Racing	(Netherlands) No. 205 JR Motorsport	(Netherlands) No. 208 Lammertink Racing	(Netherlands) No. 303 European Staffing Racing	(Netherlands) No. 407 Powermotorsports	(Netherlands) No. 501 Spirit Racing
3	R2	(Germany) Nürburgring	(Netherlands) Peter Versluis	(Netherlands) Henk Thuis (Netherlands) Pim van Riet	(Netherlands) Charlie Frijns (Netherlands) René Wijnen	(Netherlands) Koen Bogaerts (Netherlands) Pieter van Soelen	(Netherlands) Priscilla Speelman (Netherlands) John van der Voort	(Netherlands) Frank Bédorf (Netherlands) Machiel Kars
4	R1	(Belgium) Spa-Francorchamps	(Netherlands) No. 128 Mad & Daring Racing	(Netherlands) No. 201 FE Racing	(Netherlands) No. 237 DDG Motorsports	(Netherlands) No. 301 Team Riwal Racing	Did not participate	Did not participate
4	R1	(Belgium) Spa-Francorchamps	(Netherlands) Alex van 't Hoff	(Netherlands) Wolf Nathan (Netherlands) Jaap van Lagen	(Netherlands) Kees Kreijne	(Netherlands) Ferry Monster (Netherlands) Robin Monster	Did not participate	Did not participate
4	R2	(Belgium) Spa-Francorchamps	(Netherlands) No. 130 Veka Racing	(Netherlands) No. 226 Van der Kooi Lotus Racing	(Belgium) No. 210 Van Herck Racing	(Netherlands) No. 308 JR Motorsport	Did not participate	Did not participate
4	R2	(Belgium) Spa-Francorchamps	(Netherlands) Peter Versluis	(Netherlands) Jan van der Kooi	(Belgium) Werner van Herck	(Netherlands) Ted van Vliet (Netherlands) Bert van der Zweerde	Did not participate	Did not participate
5	R1	(Belgium) Zolder	(Netherlands) No. 103 Marcos Racing International	(Netherlands) No. 207 Marchal Racing	(Netherlands) No. 203 Van Berlo Racing	(Netherlands) No. 340 MadrettoR Racing	(Netherlands) No. 422 Van den Munckhof Racing	(Netherlands) No. 504 Been Racing
5	R1	(Belgium) Zolder	(Netherlands) Cor Euser	(Netherlands) Ron Marchal	(Netherlands) Jacky van der Ende (Netherlands) Nelson van der Pol	(Netherlands) Bob Herber (Netherlands) Martin Lanting	(Netherlands) Eric van den Munckhof	(Netherlands) Nico Been
5	R2	(Belgium) Zolder	(Netherlands) No. 132 Veka Racing	(Netherlands) No. 214 Van Berlo Racing	(Netherlands) No. 237 DDG Motorsports	(Belgium) No. 311 Deldiche Racing	(Netherlands) No. 407 Powermotorsports	(Netherlands) No. 504 Been Racing
5	R2	(Belgium) Zolder	(Netherlands) Jan Versluis	(Netherlands) Barry Maessen	(Netherlands) Kees Kreijne	(Belgium) Luc de Cock	(Netherlands) Priscilla Speelman (Netherlands) John van der Voort	(Netherlands) Nico Been
6	R1	(Netherlands) Assen	(Netherlands) No. 104 Speedtec Motorsport	(Netherlands) No. 214 Van Berlo Racing	(Netherlands) No. 203 Van Berlo Racing	(Netherlands) No. 307 Powermotorsports	(Netherlands) No. 407 Powermotorsports	(Netherlands) No. 506 Van der Kooi Lotus Racing
6	R1	(Netherlands) Assen	(Netherlands) Robert de Graaff (Netherlands) Phillipe Ribbens	(Netherlands) Barry Maessen	(Netherlands) Jacky van der Ende (Netherlands) Nelson van der Pol	(Netherlands) Peter Hoevenaars	(Netherlands) Priscilla Speelman (Netherlands) John van der Voort	(United Kingdom) Jeremy Adams (Netherlands) Toon Rutgers
6	R2	(Netherlands) Assen	(Netherlands) No. 104 Speedtec Motorsport	(Netherlands) No. 214 Van Berlo Racing	(Netherlands) No. 205 JR Motorsport	(Netherlands) No. 319 Speedtec Motorsport	(Netherlands) No. 427 Van der Kooi Lotus Racing	(Netherlands) No. 506 Van der Kooi Lotus Racing
6	R2	(Netherlands) Assen	(Netherlands) Robert de Graaff (Netherlands) Phillipe Ribbens	(Netherlands) Barry Maessen	(Netherlands) Henk Thuis	(Netherlands) Leo van der Eijk (Netherlands) Helmert-Jan van der Slik	(Netherlands) Harold Wisselink	(United Kingdom) Jeremy Adams (Netherlands) Toon Rutgers
7	R1	(Netherlands) Zandvoort	(Netherlands) No. 173 BlueBerry Racing	(Belgium) No. 220 Delahaye Racing Team	(Netherlands) No. 216 Team RaceArt	Did not participate	Did not participate	Did not participate
7	R1	(Netherlands) Zandvoort	(Netherlands) Berry van Elk	(France) Pierre-Etienne Bordet	(Netherlands) Erol Ertan	Did not participate	Did not participate	Did not participate
7	R2	(Netherlands) Zandvoort	(Netherlands) No. 130 Veka Racing	(Netherlands) No. 205 JR Motorsport	(Netherlands) No. 203 Van Berlo Racing	Did not participate	Did not participate	Did not participate
7	R2	(Netherlands) Zandvoort	(Netherlands) Peter Versluis	(Netherlands) Henk Thuis (Netherlands) Pim van Riet	(Netherlands) Jacky van der Ende (Netherlands) Nelson van der Pol	Did not participate	Did not participate	Did not participate
8	R1	(Belgium) Zolder	Did not participate	Did not participate	Did not participate	(Netherlands) No. 303 European Staffing Racing	(Netherlands) No. 422 Van den Munckhof Racing	(Netherlands) No. 506 Van der Kooi Lotus Racing
8	R1	(Belgium) Zolder	Did not participate	Did not participate	Did not participate	(Netherlands) Koen Bogaerts (Netherlands) Pieter van Soelen	(Netherlands) Eric van den Munckhof	(Netherlands) Toon Rutgers
8	R2	(Belgium) Zolder	Did not participate	Did not participate	Did not participate	(Netherlands) No. 303 European Staffing Racing	(Netherlands) No. 423 Van Berlo Racing	(Netherlands) No. 501 Spirit Racing
8	R2	(Belgium) Zolder	Did not participate	Did not participate	Did not participate	(Netherlands) Koen Bogaerts (Netherlands) Pieter van Soelen	(Netherlands) Marcel van Berlo	(Netherlands) Rob Nieman
9	R1	(Netherlands) Zandvoort	Did not participate	Did not participate	Did not participate	(Netherlands) No. 303 European Staffing Racing	(Netherlands) No. 422 Van den Munckhof Racing	(Netherlands) No. 506 Van der Kooi Lotus Racing
9	R1	(Netherlands) Zandvoort	Did not participate	Did not participate	Did not participate	(Netherlands) Koen Bogaerts (Netherlands) Pieter van Soelen	(Netherlands) Eric van den Munckhof	(United Kingdom) Jeremy Adams (Netherlands) Toon Rutgers
9	R2	(Netherlands) Zandvoort	Did not participate	Did not participate	Did not participate	(Netherlands) No. 307 Powermotorsports	(Netherlands) No. 407 Powermotorsports	(Netherlands) No. 501 Spirit Racing
9	R2	(Netherlands) Zandvoort	Did not participate	Did not participate	Did not participate	(Netherlands) Peter Hoevenaars	(Netherlands) Priscilla Speelman (Netherlands) John van der Voort	(Netherlands) Rob Nieman
10	R1	(Belgium) Spa-Francorchamps	(Netherlands) No. 128 Mad & Daring Racing	(United Kingdom) No. 235 Balfe Motorsport	(Netherlands) No. 237 DDG Motorsports	(Netherlands) No. 307 Powermotorsports	(Netherlands) No. 427 Van der Kooi Lotus Racing	Did not participate
10	R1	(Belgium) Spa-Francorchamps	(Netherlands) Diederik Sijthoff (Netherlands) Alex van 't Hoff	(United Kingdom) Shaun Balfe	(Netherlands) Kees Kreijne	(Netherlands) Peter Hoevenaars	(United Kingdom) Jeremy Adams (Netherlands) Toon Rutgers	Did not participate
10	R2	(Belgium) Spa-Francorchamps	(Netherlands) No. 104 Speedtec Motorsport	(United Kingdom) No. 235 Balfe Motorsport	(Belgium) No. 210 Van Herck Racing	(Netherlands) No. 321 Gravity Racing	(Netherlands) No. 407 Powermotorsports	Did not participate
10	R2	(Belgium) Spa-Francorchamps	(Netherlands) Robert de Graaff (Netherlands) Phillipe Ribbens	(United Kingdom) Shaun Balfe	(Belgium) Werner Van Herck	(Netherlands) Marcel Norbart	(Netherlands) Priscilla Speelman (Netherlands) John van der Voort	Did not participate
11	R1	(Netherlands) Assen	(Netherlands) No. 116 DB Motorsport	(Netherlands) No. 214 Van Berlo Racing	(Netherlands) No. 203 Van Berlo Racing	(Netherlands) No. 307 Powermotorsports	(Netherlands) No. 407 Powermotorsports	(Netherlands) No. 504 Been Racing
11	R1	(Netherlands) Assen	(Netherlands) Jeroen den Boer	(Netherlands) Barry Maessen	(Netherlands) Jacky van der Ende (Netherlands) Nelson van der Pol	(Netherlands) Peter Hoevenaars	(Netherlands) Priscilla Speelman (Netherlands) John van der Voort	(Netherlands) Nico Been
11	R2	(Netherlands) Assen	(Netherlands) No. 130 Veka Racing	(Netherlands) No. 214 Van Berlo Racing	(Netherlands) No. 237 DDG Motorsports	(Netherlands) No. 301 Team Riwal Racing	(Netherlands) No. 407 Powermotorsports	(Netherlands) No. 504 Been Racing
11	R2	(Netherlands) Assen	(Netherlands) Peter Versluis	(Netherlands) Barry Maessen	(Netherlands) Kees Kreijne	(Netherlands) Ferry Monster (Netherlands) Robin Monster	(Netherlands) Priscilla Speelman (Netherlands) John van der Voort	(Netherlands) Nico Been

== Drivers' championships ==
Position	**1st**	**2nd**	**3rd**	**4th**	**5th**	**6th**	**7th**	**8th**	**9th**	**10th**	**Pole**	**Fastest lap**
Points	20	18	16	14	12	10	8	6	4	2	1	1

=== Super GT and GT ===
Pos.	Driver	Team	ZOL (Belgium)		ZAN (Netherlands)		NÜR (Germany)		SPA (Belgium)		ZOL (Belgium)		ASS (Netherlands)		ZAN (Netherlands)		SPA (Belgium)		ASS (Netherlands)		Points
Super GT
1	(Netherlands) Diederik Sijthoff	(Netherlands) Mad & Daring Racing	**3**	8	**1**	1	**3**	4	**1**	7	**7**	3			Ret	2	1	4	4	Ret	256
2	(Netherlands) Robert de Graaff (Netherlands) Phillipe Ribbens	(Netherlands) Speedtec Motorsport	10	2	4	2	5	Ret	4	5	4	4	**1**	1	Ret	18	**50**	1	2	4	238
3	(Netherlands) Alex van 't Hoff	(Netherlands) Mad & Daring Racing	2	9	2	Ret	**3**	4	**1**	7	**7**	3			**9**	5	1	4	Ret	8	213
4	(Netherlands) Jan Versluis	(Netherlands) Veka Racing	4	10	3	Ret	4	3	47	Ret	3	1	3	5	13	4	8	6	DNS	5	194
5	(Netherlands) Nol Köhler	(Netherlands) Team RaceArt	5	1	Ret	Ret	1	5	2	16	5	Ret	2	2	17	6	9	7	Ret	16	192
6	(Belgium) Bert Longin	(Netherlands) Veka Racing	22	Ret	7	Ret	7	6	3	2	6	2	4	3	3	3			7	6	190
6	(Belgium) Franz Lamot	(Netherlands) Veka Racing	22	Ret	7	Ret	7	6			6	2	4	3	3	3	24	8	7	6	190
7	(Netherlands) Rick Abresch	(Netherlands) Mad & Daring Racing	**3**	8	**1**	1	6	2	8	8	2	5			Ret	DNS	3	5	4	Ret	170
8	(Netherlands) Peter Versluis	(Netherlands) Veka Racing	1	16	5	3	11	1	6	1			Ret	Ret	2	1	DNS	Ret	5	1	168
9	(Netherlands) Ardi van der Hoek	(Netherlands) Team RaceArt	5	1	Ret	Ret	1	5	2	16	5	Ret	2	2	17	6					164
10	(Netherlands) Jan Storm	(Netherlands) Storm-Tag Point Racing	8	15	5	EX	20	7	7	Ret			5	DNS	6	15	5	19	8	7	108
11	(Netherlands) Berry van Elk	(Netherlands) BlueBerry Racing	Ret	4			2		Ret	Ret	21	6	Ret	Ret	1	Ret	Ret	38	DNS	2	104
12	(Netherlands) Danny Werkman	(Netherlands) Mad & Daring Racing	7	14	6	4			8	8	Ret	DNS			4	2					84
13	(Belgium) Wim Lumbeeck	(Netherlands) DVB Racing	9	5	12	Ret					9	7			11	9	4	Ret	15	21	82
13	(Netherlands) Wim Moonen	(Netherlands) DVB Racing	9	5	12	Ret															82
13	(Netherlands) Rob Kamphues	(Netherlands) DVB Racing													11	9			15	21	82
14	(Netherlands) Roger Grouwels	(Netherlands) Team RaceArt			16	5	8	8	5	Ret	8	12	7		Ret	24	10	Ret	3	Ret	82
15	(Netherlands) Milko Tas	(Netherlands) Team RaceArt	Ret	DNS	16	5			5	Ret	8	12	7	7	Ret	24					66
15	(Netherlands) Niels Bouwhuis	(Netherlands) Team RaceArt	Ret	DNS			Ret	Ret						7							66
16	(Slovakia) Leonard Hrobārek	Race 4 Slovakia	Ret	3	Ret	Ret															21
16	(Slovakia) Leonard Hrobārek	(United Kingdom) Rollcentre Racing					Ret														21
16	(Austria) Simon Wagner	Race 4 Slovakia (Czech Republic) Praga Racing	Ret	3					Ret	Ret											21
16	(Austria) Simon Wagner	(United Kingdom) Rollcentre Racing					Ret	9													21
16	(Netherlands) Danny van Dongen	Race 4 Slovakia (Czech Republic) Praga Racing			Ret	Ret			Ret	Ret											21
17	(Belgium) Frank Thiers (Belgium) Hans Thiers	(Belgium) Scuderia Monza	6	7																	20
18	(Netherlands) Ron Marchal	(Netherlands) Marchal Racing							13	22											12
	(United Kingdom) Ric Wood	(United Kingdom) CNC Heads Racing	21	DNS																	0
Drivers ineligible for Super GT points
	(Netherlands) Jeroen den Boer	(Netherlands) DB Motorsport																	**1**	2	
	(Netherlands) Yelmer Buurman	(Netherlands) Veka Racing	1	16																	
	(Netherlands) Cor Euser	(Netherlands) Marcos Racing International									1	Ret									
	(United Kingdom) Glynn Geddie (United Kingdom) Jim Geddie	(United Kingdom) APEX Motorsport															2	3	DNS	9	
	(Netherlands) Wolf Nathan (Netherlands) Jaap van Lagen	(Netherlands) FE Racing															7	2	6	Ret	
	(Netherlands) Dick van Elk	(Netherlands) BlueBerry Racing					2	Ret													
	(Netherlands) Nicky Pastorelli	(Netherlands) Mad & Daring Racing															3	5			
	(Netherlands) René Snel	(Netherlands) RSRacing											6	4							
	(Netherlands) Carlo Kuijer	(Netherlands) Team RaceArt															9	7	Ret	16	
	(Netherlands) Bert de Heus	(Netherlands) Speedtec Motorsport			Ret	7															
	(Belgium) Koen Wauters	(Netherlands) Veka Racing															24	8			
	(United Kingdom) Martin Short	(United Kingdom) Rollcentre Racing						9													
	(Netherlands) Barry Maessen (Note: Barry Maessen was originally entered in the Super GT class, but was later put into the GT class and therefore Super GT points removed.)	(Netherlands) Van Berlo Racing	11	18																	
	(Belgium) Jerry de Weerdt (Note: Jerry de Weerdt was originally entered in the Super GT class, but was later put into the GT class and therefore Super GT points removed.)	(Netherlands) Brass Racing	13	19																	
	(Netherlands) Niels Bouwhuis	(Netherlands) Storm-Tag Point Racing		15																	
	(France) Pierre-Etienne Bordet (Note: Pierre-Etienne Bordet was originally entered in the Super GT class, but was later put into the GT class and therefore Super GT points removed.)	(United Kingdom) NCK Motorsport	20	DNS	17	Ret															
	(Netherlands) Bob Sijthoff	(Netherlands) Mad & Daring Racing Team					18	20													
GT
1	(Netherlands) Barry Maessen	(Netherlands) Van Berlo Racing			9	8	9	11	18	23	13	8	**8**	10	20	8	18	54	**9**	10	289
2	(Netherlands) Henk Thuis	(Netherlands) JR Motorsport	14	23	8	18	13	10	11	11	20	17			**8**	7	**19**	12	11	19	246
2	(Netherlands) Pim van Riet	(Netherlands) JR Motorsport	14	23	8	18	13		11	11	20	17			**8**	7	**19**	12	11	19	246
3	(Belgium) Steve Vanbellingen	(Netherlands) JR Motorsport	17	22	**13**	9	Ret	19	19	9	23	11			Ret	12	11	13	10	13	200
3	(Belgium) Bert Redant	(Netherlands) JR Motorsport	17	22	**13**	9	Ret	19	19	9	23	11			Ret	12	11	13			200
4	(Netherlands) Jan van der Kooi	(Netherlands) Van der Kooi Lotus Racing	**Ret**	6	Ret	13	Ret	Ret	16	3	Ret	Ret	Ret	Ret	24	16	DNS	39	Ret	23	130
5	(United Kingdom) Simon Atkinson	(United Kingdom) Backdraft Motorsport							37	29	15	9	Ret	17			15	11	12	11	116
6	(France) Pierre-Etienne Bordet	(United Kingdom) NCK Motorsport					23	18	Ret	Ret	22	19	DNS	DNS							91
6	(France) Pierre-Etienne Bordet	(Belgium) Delahaye Racing Team													6	Ret	Ret	10			91
7	(Netherlands) Wolf Nathan (Netherlands) Jaap van Lagen	(Netherlands) FE Racing	Ret	DNS			**10**	12	9	4											76
8	(Belgium) Jerry de Weerdt	(Netherlands) Brass Racing							25	38	11	22									46
9	(United Kingdom) Fiona James	(United Kingdom) Backdraft Motorsport	25	20	22	16			46	40											44
10	(Netherlands) Bert de Heus	(Netherlands) Speedtec Motorsport									25	10									26
11	(Netherlands) Ron Marchal	(Netherlands) Marchal Racing									**10**	Ret									23
Drivers ineligible for GT points
	(United Kingdom) Shaun Balfe	(United Kingdom) Balfe Motorsport															6	9			
	(Netherlands) Max Braams (Netherlands) Nicky Pastorelli	(Netherlands) Mad & Daring Racing			10	6															
	(United Kingdom) Michael Munemann	(Portugal) Algarve Pro Racing							**10**	10					10	Ret					
	(Netherlands) Nicky Catsburg	(Portugal) Algarve Pro Racing							**10**	10											
	(Netherlands) Jacky van der Ende (Note: Jacky van der Ende and Nelson van der Pol were originally entered in the GT class, but were later put into the GTB class and therefore GT points removed.) (Netherlands) Nelson van der Pol	(Netherlands) Van Berlo Racing	Ret	Ret	11	10															
	(Belgium) Werner van Herck (Note: Werner van Herck was originally entered in the GT class, but was later put into the GTB class and therefore GT points removed.)	(Belgium) Van Herck Racing	15	11	21	Ret															
	(Netherlands) Kees Kreijne (Note: Kees Kreijne was originally entered in the GT class, but was later put into the GTB class and therefore GT points removed.)	(Netherlands) DDG Motorsports	12	12	DNS	DNS															
	(Netherlands) Wilfred Herder (Note: Wilfred Herder was originally entered in the GT class, but was later put into the GTB class and therefore GT points removed.)	(Netherlands) DDG Motorsports	DNS	Ret	Ret	12															
	(Netherlands) Dirk Schulz (Note: Dirk Schulz was originally entered in the GT class, but was later put into the GTB class and therefore GT points removed.)	(Netherlands) Topper Team	19	Ret	19	14															
	(Netherlands) Gerard de Jong	(Netherlands) Autoblokland.nl															21	14			
	(Netherlands) Jack Rozendaal	(Netherlands) GT3 Racing Ingewaal	23	17									15	16							
	(Netherlands) Erol Ertan (Note: Erol Ertan and Steve Matthijssen were originally entered in the GT class, but were later put into the GTB class and therefore GT points removed.) (Netherlands) Steve Matthijssen	(Netherlands) Team RaceArt	18	21	20	15															
	(Netherlands) Carlo Kuijer (Note: Carlo Kuijer was originally entered in the GT class, but was later put into the GTB class and therefore GT points removed.)	(Netherlands) Divitec Racing	24	DNS																	
	(Netherlands) Rob Knook	(Netherlands) Racinginfo.com	Ret	Ret																	
	(Germany) Oliver Freymuth	(Germany) AFK Motorsport															DNS	Ret			
Pos.	Driver	Team	ZOL (Belgium)		ZAN (Netherlands)		NÜR (Germany)		SPA (Belgium)		ZOL (Belgium)		ASS (Netherlands)		ZAN (Netherlands)		SPA (Belgium)		ASS (Netherlands)		Points

Key
Colour	Result
Gold	Winner
Silver	Second place
Bronze	Third place
Green	Other points position
Blue	Other classified position
Blue	Not classified, finished (NC)
Purple	Not classified, retired (Ret)
Red	Did not qualify (DNQ)
Red	Did not pre-qualify (DNPQ)
Black	Disqualified (DSQ)
White	Did not start (DNS)
White	Race cancelled (C)
Blank	Did not practice (DNP)
Blank	Excluded (EX)
Blank	Did not arrive (DNA)
Blank	Withdrawn (WD)
Blank	Did not enter (cell empty)
Text formatting	Meaning
**Bold**	Pole position
Italics	Fastest lap

=== GTB ===
Pos.	Driver	Team	NÜR (Germany)		SPA (Belgium)		ZOL (Belgium)		ASS (Netherlands)		ZAN (Netherlands)		SPA (Belgium)		ASS (Netherlands)		Points
1	(Netherlands) Kees Kreijne	(Netherlands) DDG Motorsports	16	14	12	26	19	13	11	12	12	21	12	17	**19**	12	264
2	(Netherlands) Charlie Frijns (Netherlands) René Wijnen	(Netherlands) Lammertink Racing	**14**	13	**17**	30	**14**	14	**12**	9	19	13	20	20	20	17	241
3	(Netherlands) Jacky van der Ende (Netherlands) Nelson van der Pol	(Netherlands) Van Berlo Racing	21	16	14	17	12	21	9	13	Ret	10	25	52	13	14	233
4	(Netherlands) Erol Ertan	(Netherlands) Team RaceArt	15	15	15	19	17	15	16	15	**7**	11	**13**	16	18	Ret	222
5	(Belgium) Werner van Herck	(Belgium) Van Herck Racing			Ret	15	18	Ret	10	11	15	14	Ret	15	14	21	177
6	(Netherlands) Daan Meijer	(Netherlands) Lammertink Racing	12	Ret	Ret	32	16	16	Ret	14	16	Ret	Ret	Ret	16	20	155
7	(Netherlands) Steve Matthijssen	(Netherlands) Team RaceArt	17	21	26	25	Ret	18	Ret	DNS	14	19	47	26			146
8	(Netherlands) Dirk Schulz	(Netherlands) Topper Team	22	22	34	37	24	20	14	DNS	18	23	32	30	22	22	140
9	(Netherlands) Wilfred Herder	(Netherlands) DDG Motorsports	19	23	DNS	DNS			Ret	Ret	Ret	Ret	27	27	17	15	86
10	(Netherlands) Carlo Kuijer	(Netherlands) Divitec Racing	Ret	17	27	Ret	Ret	Ret									28
Drivers ineligible for GTB points
	(Netherlands) Henk Thuis	(Netherlands) JR Motorsport							Ret	8							
	(Netherlands) Rob Frijns	(Netherlands) Team RaceArt							16	15							
	(Netherlands) Rob Severs	(Netherlands) Team RaceArt					17	15									
	(Netherlands) Mark van der Aa	(Netherlands) Lammertink Racing													16	20	
	(Netherlands) Bert Moritz (Netherlands) Patrick Moritz	(Netherlands) Moritz Racing									23	20					
	(Netherlands) Ronald van Loon	(Netherlands) V-Max Racing									22	22					
	(Netherlands) Bob Sijthoff	(Netherlands) Topper Team			34	37											
	(Netherlands) Rob Knook	(Netherlands) Racinginfo.com			DNS	DNS											
	(United Kingdom) James Webb (United Kingdom) Tom Webb	(United Kingdom) Team Webb											DNS	DNS			
Pos.	Driver	Team	NÜR (Germany)		SPA (Belgium)		ZOL (Belgium)		ASS (Netherlands)		ZAN (Netherlands)		SPA (Belgium)		ASS (Netherlands)		Points

=== Supersport ===
Pos.	Driver	Team	ZOL (Belgium)		NÜR (Germany)		SPA (Belgium)		ZOL (Belgium)		ASS (Netherlands)		ZOL (Belgium)		ZAN (Netherlands)		SPA (Belgium)		ASS (Netherlands)		Points
1	(Netherlands) Koen Bogaerts (Netherlands) Pieter van Soelen	(Netherlands) European Staffing Racing	**1**	4	1	1	Ret	24	2	2	Ret	31	1	1	1	6	23	22	2	2	270
2	(Netherlands) Ferry Monster (Netherlands) Robin Monster	(Netherlands) Team Riwal Racing	3	2	3	5	20	14	5	3	2	3	7	4	2	2	16	23	6	1	269
3	(Netherlands) Peter Hoevenaars	(Netherlands) Powermotorsports	2	1	**DNS**	Ret	28	18	3	5	1	2	**4**	18	3	1	14	24	**1**	3	259
4	(Netherlands) Bob Herber	(Netherlands) MadrettoR Racing	23	6	Ret	2	30	21	**1**	Ret	9	29	3	3	7	3	30	32	5	5	173
4	(Netherlands) Martin Lanting	(Netherlands) MadrettoR Racing	23	6	Ret	2	30	21	**1**	Ret	9	29			7	3	30	32	5	5	173
5	(Netherlands) Peter Stox	(Netherlands) PS Autosport	5	7	4	3	22	12	8	12	**12**	13	2	2			**17**	25	Ret	Ret	163
5	(Netherlands) Andre de Vries	(Netherlands) PS Autosport			4	3	22	12	8	12	**12**	13	2	2			**17**	25	Ret	Ret	163
6	(United Kingdom) David Nye	(Belgium) Spork Racing Team	6	8	7	8	35	27	10	6	8	5	24	8	6	4	26	29	11	Ret	126
6	(Belgium) Jimmy Adriaenssens	(Belgium) Spork Racing Team	6	8	7	8	35	27	10	6	8	5	24	8	6	4	26	29	11	Ret	126
6	(Belgium) Jimmy Adriaenssens	(Belgium) RMR Racing													13	5					126
7	(Netherlands) Ted van Vliet	(Netherlands) JR Motorsport	10	5	10	10	**31**	6	14	22					4	11			8	Ret	103
7	(Netherlands) Bert van der Zweerde	(Netherlands) JR Motorsport	10	5			**31**	6			5	4			4	11			8	Ret	103
8	(Belgium) Luc de Cock	(Belgium) Deldiche Racing	Ret	26	2	Ret	24	31	4	1	DNS	DNS	6	24			35	Ret			85
9	(Netherlands) Helmert-Jan van der Slik	(Netherlands) Speedtec Motorsport			Ret	28	Ret	DNS	7	25	3	1	5	Ret	Ret	Ret					76
9	(Netherlands) Leo van der Eijk	(Netherlands) Speedtec Motorsport			Ret	28	Ret	DNS		25	3	1	5	Ret					3	18	76
10	(Netherlands) Aart Bosman	(Netherlands) ABW Racing	4	10	5	6	38	20	29	11	13	11	8	EX					Ret	4	74
11	(Netherlands) Nico van Vliet (Netherlands) Peter van Vliet	(Netherlands) Speedtec Motorsport	Ret	16	Ret	Ret	43	45	30	26	7	7	10	6	8	11	49	28	12	7	62
12	(United Kingdom) David Krayem	(United Kingdom) Krayem Racing	28	12			39	42	9	DNS	6	9	11	7	16	16	28	33	7	Ret	58
13	(Netherlands) Marc Rooker	(Netherlands) Ferry Monster Autosport			Ret	9	29	13			4	8									54
14	(Netherlands) Dick van der Donk	(Netherlands) Kuijpers Racing	Ret	9	6	7	45	41	Ret	16	Ret	6	Ret	23	24	9	42	Ret	9	Ret	50
15	(Belgium) Jonas de Kimpe	(Belgium) Spork Racing Team	9	22	Ret	13	33	33	12	Ret	10	10	Ret	12	9	8	Ret	34	10	9	38
15	(Belgium) Vincent van Paemel	(Belgium) Spork Racing Team	9	22	Ret	13	33	33	12	Ret	10	10			9	8	Ret	34	10	9	38
16	(Netherlands) Ronald van Loon	(Netherlands) BlueBerry Racing	8	Ret	Ret	DNS	Ret	36	Ret	4	Ret	32					37	41	Ret	7	34
17	(Netherlands) Léo Kurstjens	(Netherlands) AT Motorsport	13	Ret	15	18			21	7	Ret	28	Ret	10	10	13	Ret	49	13	Ret	20
18	(Netherlands) Marcel van Rijswick	(Netherlands) PS Autosport	11	11	8	11	42	43	6	Ret											18
18	(Netherlands) Claude L'Ortye	(Netherlands) PS Autosport	11	11	8	11	42	43													18
19	(Netherlands) Jasper Bijl (Netherlands) Robert Bijl	(Netherlands) Bijl Motorsport			16	16	41	39					12	11	17	DNS	33	43	Ret	8	14
20	(Belgium) Wim Meulders	(Belgium) AB Racing Team	7	Ret	9	12	36	44													12
20	(Belgium) Bert Longin	(Belgium) AB Racing Team	7	Ret	9	12															12
21	(Netherlands) Remco de Beus	(Netherlands) Brax Racing	24	Ret	23	Ret	44	34	13	Ret	11	12			Ret	10	43	35	WD	WD	8
22	(Belgium) Wim de Graef	(Belgium) Spork Racing Team	18	15			32	Ret													6
23	(Belgium) Bart van den Broeck (Belgium) Chris Voet	(Belgium) Traxx Racing Team	17	14	17	17	40	35	15	20			14	15	18	14	34	36	14	Ret	4
24	(United Kingdom) Richard Fearns	(United Kingdom) DVB Racing	25	13	11	Ret			Ret	DNS	Ret	Ret									0
25	(Belgium) Kris van Kelst	(Belgium) Spork Racing Team	18	15																	0
26	(Belgium) Geoffrey Vankets	(Belgium) Vankets Motorsport	Ret	29	Ret	DNS					Ret	22									0
	(Netherlands) Martin van den Berge	(Belgium) Vankets Motorsport			Ret	DNS															0
Drivers ineligible for Supersport points
	(Netherlands) Marcel Norbart	(Netherlands) Gravity Racing			Ret	4	21	Ret									31	18	4	Ret	
	(Netherlands) Cor Euser	(Netherlands) Cor Euser Racing															22	21			
	(Netherlands) Daan Meijer	(Netherlands) Lammertink Racing	12	3							15	Ret									
	(Netherlands) Bas Schouten	(Netherlands) Speedtec Motorsport																	3	18	
	(United Kingdom) Martin Webb	(United Kingdom) Team Webb					23	28									DNS	DNS			
	(Netherlands) Marco Poland	(Netherlands) JR Motorsport									5	4									
	(Russia) Lev Fridman	(Netherlands) Ferry Monster Autosport									4	8									
	(Netherlands) Stéphane Kox (Netherlands) Dennis Retera	(Germany) Dörr Motorsport													5	7					
	(Belgium) Michael Damoiseaux (Belgium) Pierre-Yves Rosoux	(Belgium) MTE Racing											9	5							
	(Belgium) Rudy Lemmens	(Belgium) RMR Racing													13	5					
	(Netherlands) Jan Lammers	(Netherlands) Speedtec Motorsport							7												
	(Netherlands) Ruud Olij	(Netherlands) JR Motorsport															38	31			
	(Belgium) Pascal Nelissen-Grade (Belgium) Patrick Poncelet	(Belgium) MTE Racing							11	13							Ret	51			
	(Netherlands) Jacky van der Ende	(Netherlands) Brax Racing							13	Ret											
	(Netherlands) Pim van Riet	(Netherlands) JR Motorsport							14	22											
	(Netherlands) Ron Braspenning (Netherlands) Iman van Schelven	(Netherlands) Braspenning Racing			14	Ret															
	(France) Philippe Bonnel (Belgium) Bruno Vermote	(Belgium) Qvick Motors Racing															48	Ret			
	(Netherlands) Henk Thijssen (Netherlands) Ton Verkoelen	(Netherlands) Johan Kraan Motorsports									19	21									
	(United Kingdom) Keith Butcher	(United Kingdom) Keith Butcher Racing							22	DNS											
	(United Kingdom) Gary Furst	(United Kingdom) Toleman Motorsport							Ret	Ret											
	(Netherlands) Marcel ter Horst	(Netherlands) Speedtec Motorsport													Ret	Ret					
	(Netherlands) Toon van de Haterd	(Netherlands) JR Motorsport							DNS	DNS											
	(Netherlands) Tom Koop	(Netherlands) Tom Koop Racing															DNS	DNS			
SEAT León Supercopa
1	(Netherlands) Ferry Monster (Netherlands) Robin Monster	(Netherlands) Team Riwal Racing	**3**	2	**3**	5	**20**	14	**5**	3	**2**	3	**7**	4	**2**	2	**16**	23	**6**	1	393
2	(Belgium) Jimmy Adriaenssens (United Kingdom) David Nye	(Belgium) Spork Racing Team	6	8	7	8	35	27	10	6	8	5	24	8	6	4	26	29	11	Ret	290
3	(Belgium) Jonas de Kimpe	(Belgium) Spork Racing Team	9	22	Ret	13	33	33	12	Ret	10	10	Ret	12	9	8	Ret	34	10	9	210
3	(Belgium) Vincent van Paemel	(Belgium) Spork Racing Team	9	22	Ret	13	33	33	12	Ret	10	10			9	8	Ret	34	10	9	210
4	(Belgium) Bart van den Broeck (Belgium) Chris Voet	(Belgium) Traxx Racing Team	17	14	17	17	40	35	15	20			14	15	18	14	34	36	14	Ret	194
5	(Netherlands) Jasper Bijl (Netherlands) Robert Bijl	(Netherlands) Bijl Motorsport			16	16	41	39					12	11	17	DNS	33	43	Ret	8	136
6	(Netherlands) Remco de Beus	(Netherlands) Brax Racing	24	Ret	23	Ret	44	34	13	Ret	11	12			Ret	10	43	35	WD	WD	118
7	(Netherlands) Marc Rooker	(Netherlands) Ferry Monster Autosport			Ret	9	29	13			4	8									89
8	(Belgium) Wim de Graef	(Belgium) Spork Racing Team	18	15			32	Ret													42
8	(Belgium) Kris van Kelst	(Belgium) Spork Racing Team	18	15																	42
9	(Belgium) Geoffrey Vankets	(Belgium) Vankets Motorsport	Ret	29	Ret	DNS					Ret	22									30
9	(Netherlands) Martin van den Berge	(Belgium) Vankets Motorsport			Ret	DNS															30
Pos.	Driver	Team	ZOL (Belgium)		NÜR (Germany)		SPA (Belgium)		ZOL (Belgium)		ASS (Netherlands)		ZOL (Belgium)		ZAN (Netherlands)		SPA (Belgium)		ASS (Netherlands)		Points

=== Sport 1 ===
Pos.	Driver	Team	ZOL (Belgium)		NÜR (Germany)		ZOL (Belgium)		ASS (Netherlands)		ZOL (Belgium)		ZAN (Netherlands)		SPA (Belgium)		ASS (Netherlands)		Points
1	(Netherlands) John van der Voort	(Netherlands) Powermotorsports	15	Ret	**13**	14	17	8	**14**	16	**25**	Ret	Ret	12	**39**	42	**15**	10	277
1	(Netherlands) Priscilla Speelman	(Netherlands) Powermotorsports			**13**	14	17	8	**14**	16	**25**	Ret	Ret	12	**39**	42	**15**	10	277
2	(Netherlands) Eric van den Munckhof	(Netherlands) Munckhof Racing	**14**	19	26	DNS	**16**	10	21	Ret	13	21	**11**	20	Ret	48	16	11	248
3	(Netherlands) Marcel van Berlo	(Netherlands) Van Berlo Racing			24	23	19	Ret	27	24	15	13					26	12	136
4	(France) Guillaume Schulz	(Netherlands) Team TDM	16	17	12	15	18	24	16	Ret									122
5	(Netherlands) Harold Wisselink	(Netherlands) Van der Kooi Lotus Racing	20	21	Ret	19			17	15			12	15					116
6	(Netherlands) Kevin van Eldik	(Netherlands) KH Racing					24	18	23	18			22	19					84
6	(Netherlands) Jacky Ekkelboom	(Netherlands) KH Racing					24	18	23	18									84
7	(Ukraine) Irina Protasova	(Ukraine) Chayka Racing	DNS	DNS	Ret	26													78
7	(Ukraine) Mark Kramerenko (Ukraine) Artem Shabazov	(Ukraine) Chayka Racing									22	22			44	46			78
8	(Netherlands) Leon Zappeij	(Netherlands) LZ Racing	26	Ret	Ret	27	26	Ret			Ret	Ret	Ret	21	45	53			74
9	(Netherlands) Michael Verhagen	(Netherlands) Verhagen Racing	30	20	Ret	Ret	Ret	9	Ret	30	23	Ret	Ret	Ret	DNS	DNS	Ret	Ret	71
10	(Netherlands) Eline Braspenning	(Netherlands) Braspenning Racing			22	24			31	Ret									36
10	(Netherlands) Ron Braspenning	(Netherlands) Braspenning Racing							31	Ret									36
11	(Netherlands) Jan-Jaap van Dalen	(Netherlands) JR Motorsport	31	27															20
12	(Ukraine) Leonid Protasov	(Ukraine) Chayka Racing	32	DNS	Ret	26													16
	(Ukraine) Igor Denisov	(Ukraine) Chayka Racing	DNS	DNS															0
Drivers ineligible for Sport 1 points
	(United Kingdom) Jeremy Adams (Netherlands) Toon Rutgers	(Netherlands) Van der Kooi Lotus Racing													29	45	DNS	20	
	(Netherlands) Stephan Polderman (Netherlands) René Steenmetz	(Netherlands) Madeno Racing	29	18															
	(Netherlands) Tim Hummel	(Netherlands) YURT Motorsport by Day V Tec											12	17	41	47	17	Ret	
	(Netherlands) Joost van de Wiel	(Netherlands) KH Racing											22	19					
	(Netherlands) Laurens Gooshouwer	(Netherlands) JR Motorsport			18	20			20	27									
	(Netherlands) Wesley Caransa	(Netherlands) YURT Motorsport by Day V Tec											20	18	40	44	18	Ret	
	(Netherlands) Maurits Caransa	(Netherlands) YURT Motorsport by Day V Tec											26	25	46	50	20	14	
	(Netherlands) Eddy Lambeck (Netherlands) Auke Wiegers	(Netherlands) Horeca Beheer Racing															24	16	
	(Netherlands) Alfred Möller	(Netherlands) JR Motorsport							20	27									
	(Ukraine) Sergii Pustovoitenko	(Ukraine) Chayka Racing	32	DNS	Ret	DNS													
	(Netherlands) Millko Tas	(Netherlands) Powermotorsports		Ret															
Pos.	Driver	Team	ZOL (Belgium)		NÜR (Germany)		ZOL (Belgium)		ASS (Netherlands)		ZOL (Belgium)		ZAN (Netherlands)		SPA (Belgium)		ASS (Netherlands)		Points

=== Sport 2 ===
Pos.	Driver	Team	ZOL (Belgium)		NÜR (Germany)		ZOL (Belgium)		ASS (Netherlands)		ZOL (Belgium)		ZAN (Netherlands)		ASS (Netherlands)		Points
1	(Netherlands) Rob Nieman	(Netherlands) Spirit Racing	22	24	19	22	26	17	Ret	20	17	14	19	22	22	15	289
2	(Netherlands) Frank Bédorf (Netherlands) Machiel Kars	(Netherlands) Spirit Racing	27	25	20	21	28	15	28	19	20	16	21	23	21	17	255
3	(Netherlands) Kim Troeyen	(Netherlands) AT Motorsport	33	28	25	25	27	DNS	30	25	19	17	23	25	Ret	21	204
4	(United Kingdom) Jeremy Adams	(Netherlands) Van der Kooi Lotus Racing	**19**	23	**Ret**	Ret	**25**	19	**22**	14			**15**	24	Ret	DNS	189
4	(Netherlands) Toon Rutgers	(Netherlands) Van der Kooi Lotus Racing	**19**	23			**25**	19	**22**	14	**16**	20	**15**	24	Ret	DNS	189
5	(Netherlands) Nico Been	(Netherlands) Been Racing	21	Ret	21	Ret	23	14	27	26	18	Ret			**19**	13	167
6	(Netherlands) Pascal Ehlert	(Netherlands) Race Service Simonis					32	23							25	19	46
7	(Netherlands) Liesette Braams	(Netherlands) Las Moras Racing					31	21									22
	(Netherlands) Patrick Simonis	(Netherlands) Race Service Simonis					Ret	Ret									0
Drivers ineligible for Sport 2 points
	(Netherlands) Sipke Bijzitter (Netherlands) Martin van Luik	(Netherlands) Zilhouette Cup							25	17							
	(Netherlands) Bas de Jong (Netherlands) Roelof Peter van der Velde	(Netherlands) Zilhouette Cup							24	Ret							
	(Netherlands) Giel van Lierop	(Netherlands) Race Service Simonis													25	19	
	(Netherlands) Peter Kox (Netherlands) Stéphane Kox	(Germany) Dörr Motorsport									21	19					
	(Netherlands) Ben Verwoerdt	(Netherlands) Van der Kooi Lotus Racing							29	23							
	(Netherlands) Carlijn Bergsma (Netherlands) Claude L'Ortye	(Netherlands) PS Autosport							Ret	DNS							
Pos.	Driver	Team	ZOL (Belgium)		NÜR (Germany)		ZOL (Belgium)		ASS (Netherlands)		ZOL (Belgium)		ZAN (Netherlands)		ASS (Netherlands)		Points
