= 2019 NASCAR Whelen Euro Series =

European auto racing season

Locations of the circuits that hosted a NASCAR Whelen Euro Series race in 2019

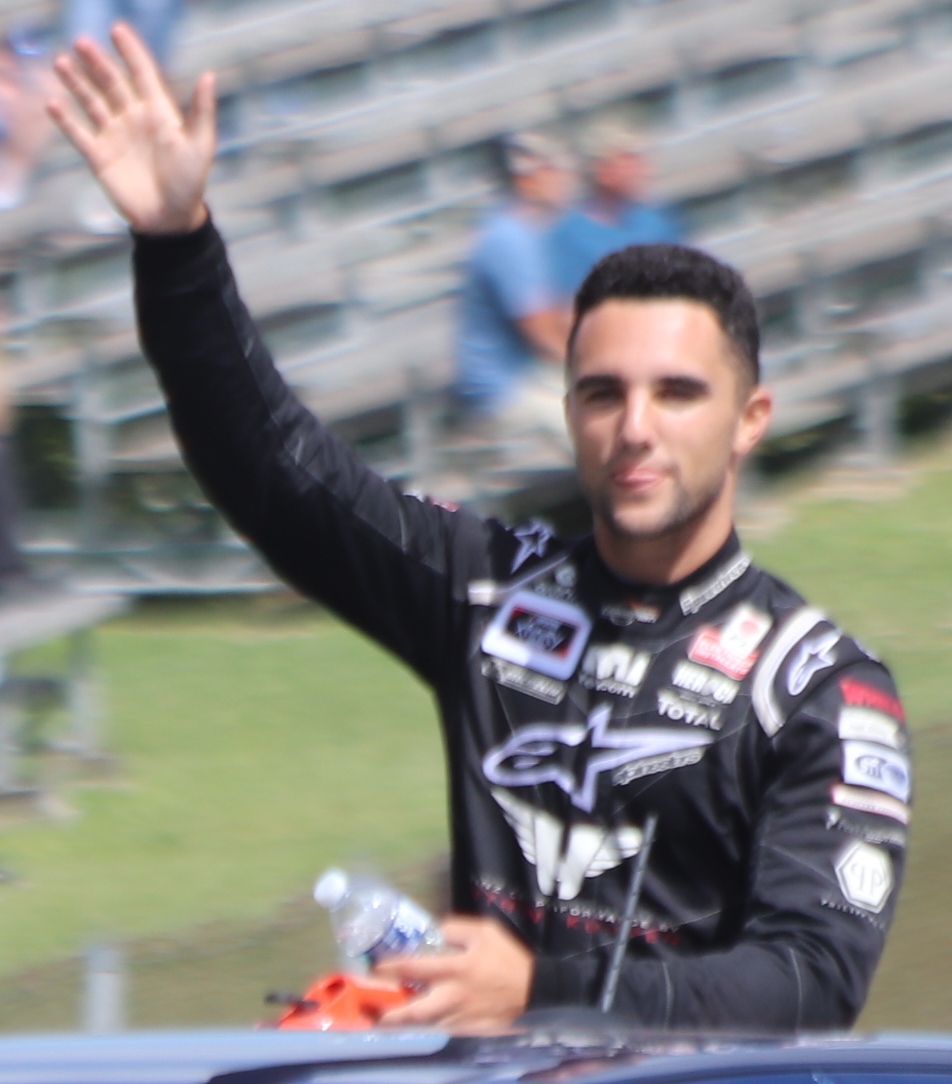
Loris Hezemans, the 2019 NASCAR Whelen Euro Series Elite 1 Champion.

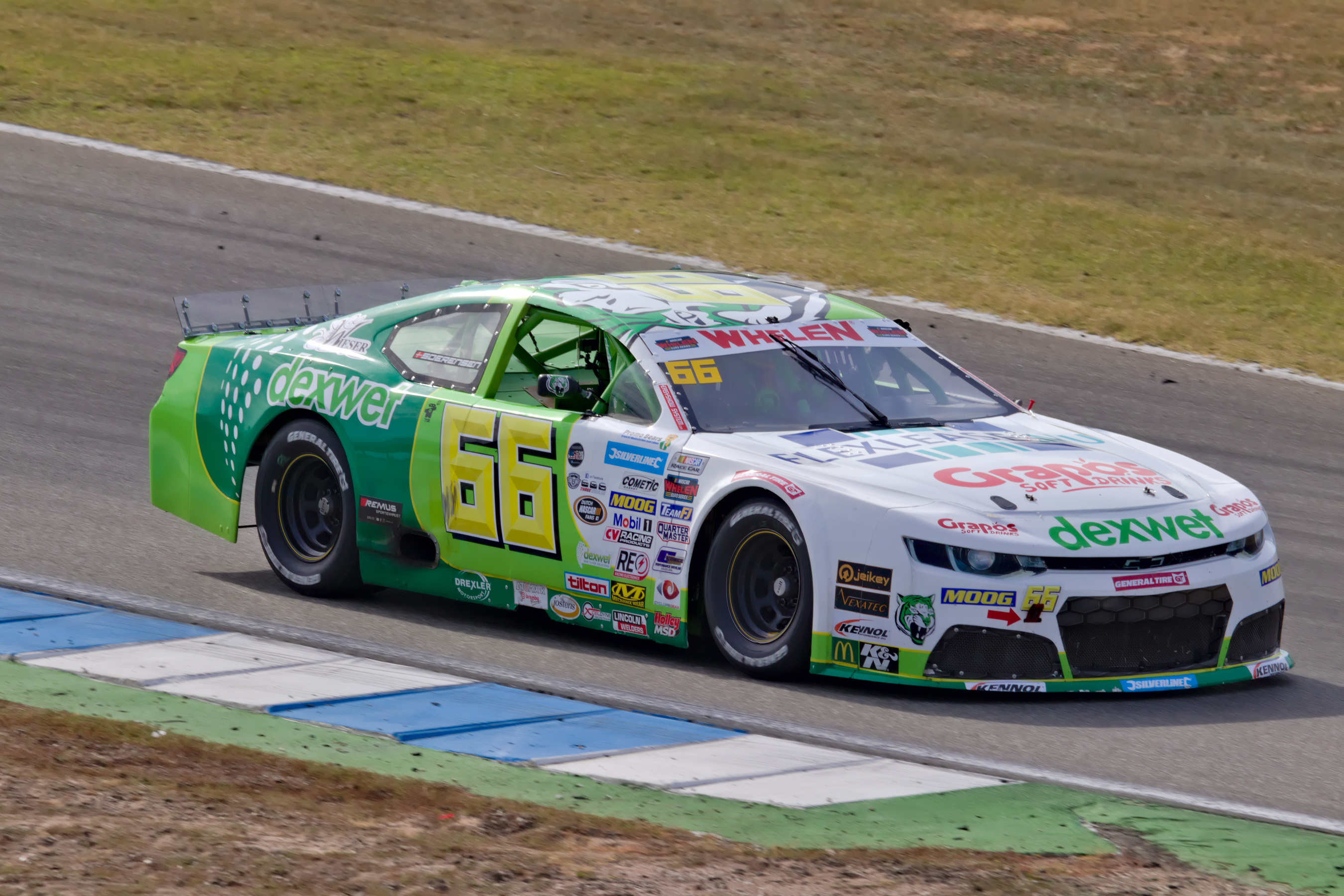
Lasse Sørensen, the 2019 NASCAR Whelen Euro Series Elite 2 Champion.

The 2019 NASCAR Whelen Euro Series was the eleventh Racecar Euro Series season, and the seventh under the NASCAR Whelen Euro Series branding. Alon Day and Ulysse Delsaux entered the season as the defending champion in the Elite 1 and Elite 2 category respectively, however Delsaux did not defend his title as he moved up to Elite 1 for the 2019 season.

In the Elite 1 class, Loris Hezemans won his first Elite 1 title, winning the championship by 49 points over PK Carsport driver Stienes Longin. In the Elite 2 class, despite not starting every race of the season, Lasse Sørensen won the title after he scored 7 race wins and finishing in the podium in all but one of his 11 starts. Sørensen and Giorgio Maggi arrived to the final race of the season at Circuit Zolder with only one point separating them in the championship, and Sørensen would finish ahead of Maggi in the race to win the title by 9 points. Hendriks Motorsport, represented by the No. 50 team of Hezemans and Maggi, won the Team's Championship title by 112 points from PK Carsport's No. 24 team.

== Teams and drivers ==
NASCAR released the 33-car entry list for the teams participating on 25 March 2019.

=== Elite 1 ===
Team	No.	Body Style	Race Driver	Rounds
(Monaco) Alex Caffi Motorsport	1	Ford Mustang	(Mexico) Rubén García Jr.	1
(Monaco) Alex Caffi Motorsport	1	Ford Mustang	(Monaco) Alex Caffi (Note: Caffi is an Italian driver who will race under a Monégasque racing license.)	2
(Monaco) Alex Caffi Motorsport	1	Ford Mustang	(United States) Jennifer Jo Cobb	3
(Monaco) Alex Caffi Motorsport	1	Ford Mustang	(France) Christophe Bouchut	4
(Monaco) Alex Caffi Motorsport	1	Ford Mustang	(Slovakia) Michaela Dorcikova	6
(Monaco) Alex Caffi Motorsport	2	Chevrolet SS 1 Chevrolet Camaro 6	(Japan) Kenko Miura	All
(Monaco) Alex Caffi Motorsport	27	Ford Mustang	(France) Thomas Ferrando	1–3
(France) RDV Competition	3	Chevrolet SS	(France) Frédéric Gabillon	All
(France) RDV Competition	36	Chevrolet Camaro	(France) Ulysse Delsaux	All
(Netherlands) Hendriks Motorsport	7	Ford Mustang	(Czech Republic) Martin Doubek	1–2, 4–7
(Netherlands) Hendriks Motorsport	50	Ford Mustang	(Netherlands) Loris Hezemans	All
(Italy) Racers Motorsport	8	Chevrolet Camaro	(Italy) Dario Caso	All
(Italy) Racers Motorsport	9	Ford Mustang	(Italy) Gianmarco Ercoli	All
(Italy) Racers Motorsport	19	Ford Mustang 1 Chevrolet Camaro 3	(Italy) Simone Laureti	1–4
(Germany) Racing-Total JJCR (Note: Car No. 10 entered as Racing-Total JJCR and car No. 46 entered as Racing-Total AmD Tuning.) (Germany) Racing-Total AmD Tuning	10	Chevrolet Camaro	(Spain) Julio Carayol Casas	1
(Germany) Racing-Total JJCR (Germany) Racing-Total AmD Tuning	46	Ford Mustang	(United Kingdom) Ant Whorton-Eales	1–2
(Belgium) PK Carsport	11	Chevrolet Camaro	(Belgium) Stienes Longin	All
(Belgium) PK Carsport	24	Chevrolet Camaro	(Italy) Nicolò Rocca	All
(Belgium) PK Carsport	98	Ford Mustang	(Belgium) Dylan Derdaele	6–7
(Italy) Solaris Motorsport	12	Chevrolet Camaro	(Italy) Francesco Sini	1–4, 6–7
(Germany) Marko Stipp - DF1 Racing	22	Ford Mustang	(Greece) Ioannis Smyrlis	6
(Sweden) Memphis Racing	23	Chevrolet Camaro	(Finland) Henri Tuomaala	All
(Sweden) Memphis Racing	77	Chevrolet Camaro	(Sweden) Alexander Graff	All
(Italy) CAAL Racing	27	Ford Mustang	(France) Thomas Ferrando	4–7
(Italy) CAAL Racing	31	Chevrolet SS	(Switzerland) Mauro Trione	All
(Italy) CAAL Racing	54	Chevrolet SS	(Israel) Alon Day	All
(Italy) CAAL Racing	56	Chevrolet SS	(Germany) Marco Santamaria	6
(United States) Go Fas Racing	32	Chevrolet Camaro	(Canada) Jacques Villeneuve	All
(Germany) Mishumotors	33	Chevrolet Camaro	(France) Lucas Lasserre	1–4, 6–7
(Germany) Mishumotors	70	Chevrolet SS 4 Chevrolet Camaro 1	(United States) Bobby Labonte	1
(Germany) Mishumotors	70	Chevrolet SS 4 Chevrolet Camaro 1	(United States) Eric Filgueiras	2–3
(Germany) Mishumotors	70	Chevrolet SS 4 Chevrolet Camaro 1	(Spain) Salvador Tineo Arroyo	4
(Germany) Mishumotors	70	Chevrolet SS 4 Chevrolet Camaro 1	(Germany) Daniel Keilwitz	6
(Italy) The Club Motorsports	41	Chevrolet Camaro	(Italy) Max Lanza	1, 3
(Italy) The Club Motorsports	41	Chevrolet Camaro	(Italy) Lorenzo Marcucci	6
(Switzerland) 42 Racing by FS Motorsport	42	Ford Mustang	(Italy) Luigi Ferrara	2
(Germany) Marko Stipp Motorsport (Note: Entered as Marko Stipp Motorsport AmD Tuning for Brands Hatch.)	46	Ford Mustang	(United Kingdom) Ant Whorton-Eales	3
(Germany) Marko Stipp Motorsport	46	Ford Mustang	(Spain) Salvador Tineo Arroyo	5, 7
(Spain) Racing Engineering	48	Ford Mustang	(Spain) Ander Vilariño	All
(Spain) Racing Engineering	88	Ford Mustang	(France) Romain Iannetta	All
(France) Speedhouse 64	64	Chevrolet SS	(Spain) Salvador Tineo Arroyo	1–3, 6
(Austria) Dexwet-df1 Racing	66	Chevrolet Camaro	(France) Christophe Bouchut	1–2
(Austria) Dexwet-df1 Racing	66	Chevrolet Camaro	(Denmark) Lasse Sørensen	3–4
(Austria) Dexwet-df1 Racing	99	Chevrolet Camaro	(Germany) Ellen Lohr	1–5
(Austria) Dexwet-df1 Racing	99	Chevrolet Camaro	(Belgium) Guillaume Deflandre	6–7
(Netherlands) Team Bleekemolen	69	Ford Mustang	(Netherlands) Sebastiaan Bleekemolen	All
(Belgium) Braxx Racing	78	Ford Mustang	(Belgium) Marc Goossens	1–3, 7
(Belgium) Braxx Racing	90	Chevrolet Camaro	(United Kingdom) Alex Sedgwick	1–3, 7
(Belgium) Braxx Racing	90	Chevrolet Camaro	(United Kingdom) Scott Jeffs	6
(Belgium) Motorsport 98	98	Ford Mustang	(Belgium) Eric De Doncker	1–4

=== Elite 2 ===
Team	No.	Body Style	Race Driver	Rounds
(Monaco) Alex Caffi Motorsport	1	Ford Mustang	(Greece) Thomas Krasonis	1–4, 6
(Monaco) Alex Caffi Motorsport	2	[[[Chevrolet SS (sedan)|Chevrolet SS]] 1 Chevrolet Camaro 6	(Finland) Jesse Vartiainen	All
(Monaco) Alex Caffi Motorsport	27	Ford Mustang	(Italy) Pierluigi Veronesi	1–3
(Netherlands) Hendriks Motorsport	7	Ford Mustang	(Czech Republic) Martin Doubek	1–2, 4–7
(Netherlands) Hendriks Motorsport	50	Ford Mustang	(Switzerland) Giorgio Maggi	All
(Italy) Racers Motorsport	8	Chevrolet Camaro	(Italy) Nicholas Risitano	All
(Italy) Racers Motorsport	9	Ford Mustang	(Italy) Vittorio Ghirelli	1–3
(Italy) Racers Motorsport	9	Ford Mustang	(Italy) Alessandro Brigatti	4, 6–7
(Italy) Racers Motorsport	9	Ford Mustang	(Italy) Simone Laureti	5
(Italy) Racers Motorsport	19	Ford Mustang 1 Chevrolet Camaro 3	(Italy) Alessandro Brigatti	1–3
(Italy) Racers Motorsport	19	Ford Mustang 1 Chevrolet Camaro 3	(France) Florian Venturi	4
(Germany) Racing-Total JJCR (Germany) Racing-Total AmD Tuning	10	Chevrolet Camaro	(United States) Jennifer Jo Cobb	1
(Germany) Racing-Total JJCR (Germany) Racing-Total AmD Tuning	46	Ford Mustang	(United Kingdom) Shaun Hollamby	1–2
(Belgium) PK Carsport	11	Chevrolet Camaro	(Belgium) Bert Longin	1–2
(Belgium) PK Carsport	11	Chevrolet Camaro	(Sweden) Freddy Nordström	3
(Belgium) PK Carsport	11	Chevrolet Camaro	(Italy) Vittorio Ghirelli	4
(Belgium) PK Carsport	11	Chevrolet Camaro	(Netherlands) Barry Maessen	5
(Belgium) PK Carsport	11	Chevrolet Camaro	(Belgium) Niels Albert	7
(Belgium) PK Carsport	24	Chevrolet Camaro	(United States) Andre Castro	1–4
(Belgium) PK Carsport	24	Chevrolet Camaro	(Italy) Vittorio Ghirelli	5–7
(Belgium) PK Carsport	98	Ford Mustang	(Belgium) Pol van Pollaert	6–7
(Italy) Solaris Motorsport	12	Chevrolet Camaro	(Israel) Naveh Talor	1–4, 6–7
(Germany) Marko Stipp – DF1 Racing	22	Ford Mustang	(Greece) Ioannis Smyrlis	6
(Sweden) Memphis Racing	23	Chevrolet Camaro	(Finland) Ian Eric Wadén	All
(Sweden) Memphis Racing	77	Chevrolet Camaro	(Sweden) Freddie Hemborg	1–5, 7
(Sweden) Memphis Racing	77	Chevrolet Camaro	(Finland) Janne Koikkalainen	6
(Italy) CAAL Racing	27	Ford Mustang	(Italy) Pierluigi Veronesi	4–7
(Italy) CAAL Racing	31	Chevrolet SS	(Iran) Meisam Taheri	1
(Italy) CAAL Racing	31	Chevrolet SS	(Italy) Moreno di Silvestre	2
(Italy) CAAL Racing	31	Chevrolet SS	(India) Advait Deodhar	3–4, 6–7
(Italy) CAAL Racing	54	Chevrolet SS	(Italy) Arianna Casoli	1–4, 6–7
(Italy) CAAL Racing	56	Chevrolet SS	(Italy) Moreno di Silvestre	6
(United States) Go Fas Racing	32	Chevrolet Camaro	(France) Florian Venturi	1–3
(Germany) Mishumotors	33	Chevrolet Camaro	(United Kingdom) Ben Creanor	1–4, 6–7
(Germany) Mishumotors	70	Chevrolet SS 4 Chevrolet Camaro 1	(Germany) Mirco Schultis	1–4, 6
(Italy) The Club Motorsports	41	Chevrolet Camaro	(Italy) Max Lanza	1–3, 6
(Switzerland) 42 Racing by FS Motorsport	42	Ford Mustang	(Italy) Claudio Remigio Cappelli	2
(Germany) Marko Stipp Motorsport	46	Ford Mustang	(United Kingdom) Shaun Hollamby	3
(Germany) Marko Stipp Motorsport	46	Ford Mustang	(United States) Andre Castro	5–6
(Spain) Racing Engineering	48	Ford Mustang	(United States) Myatt Snider	All
(Spain) Racing Engineering	88	Ford Mustang	(France) Eric Clément	2–4
(Spain) Racing Engineering	88	Ford Mustang	(Spain) Alfonso de Orléans-Borbón	5
(Spain) Racing Engineering	88	Ford Mustang	(Switzerland) Hugo de Sadeleer	6–7
(France) Speedhouse 64	64	Chevrolet SS	(France) Eric Quintal	1
(France) Speedhouse 64	64	Chevrolet SS	(India) Advait Deodhar	2
(France) Speedhouse 64	64	Chevrolet SS	(Germany) Matthias Hauer	3, 6–7
(Austria) Dexwet-df1 Racing	66	Chevrolet Camaro	(India) Advait Deodhar	1
(Austria) Dexwet-df1 Racing	66	Chevrolet Camaro	(Denmark) Lasse Sørensen	2–7
(Austria) Dexwet-df1 Racing	99	Chevrolet Camaro	(Germany) Justin Kunz	All
(Netherlands) Team Bleekemolen	69	Ford Mustang	(Netherlands) Michael Bleekemolen	All
(Belgium) Braxx Racing	78	Ford Mustang	(Belgium) Jerry de Weerdt	1–3
(Belgium) Braxx Racing	78	Ford Mustang	(Belgium) Sven van Laere	7
(Belgium) Braxx Racing	90	Chevrolet Camaro	(United Kingdom) Scott Jeffs	1–3
(Belgium) Motorsport 98	98	Ford Mustang	(Belgium) Eric De Doncker	1–4

==== Driver changes ====
- Former Cup Series driver, 1995 Indianapolis 500 winner and 1997 Formula One champion Jacques Villeneuve is set to make his Euro Series debut for Go Fas Racing in the Elite 1 class, replacing Romain Iannetta who switched teams to Racing Engineering.
- DTM's only female race winner Ellen Lohr is set to make her Euro Series debut for Dexwet-df1 Racing in the Elite 1 class. She will drive the #99 car, which was driven by Advait Deodhar in the Elite 2 class last season. Deodhar himself will stay with the team as he will make his first full-season campaign in the Elite 2 class with the #66 team for the 2019 season.
- Justin Kunz will make a switch from Racing Total to Dexwet-df1 Racing for 2019.
- Defending Elite 2 champion Ulysse Delsaux will move up to the Elite 1 class to drive the No. 36 RDV Competition entry, replacing Bobby Labonte who moved to Mishumotors to drive the No. 70 Camaro.
- 2016 Mini Challenge UK Cooper S Class champion Scott Jeffs will make his Euro Series for Braxx Racing in the Elite 2 class. He will partner with Alex Sedgwick in the No. 90 entry for the 2019 season.
- Pierluigi Veronesi will make a switch from BVR Motorsport to Alex Caffi Motorsport for 2019.
- Jesse Vartiainen is scheduled to make his Euro Series debut for Alex Caffi Motorsport in the No. 2 Elite 2 entry. He previously made an appearance at the Hockenheim round last season for Caffi.
- Ben Creanor is scheduled to make his Euro Series debut in the No. 33 Elite 2 entry for Mishumotors.
- Shaun Hollamby, the owner of BTCC team AmD Essex, is scheduled to make his Euro Series debut in the No. 46 Elite 2 entry for Racing Total, replacing the departing Justin Kunz.
- Martin Doubek will compete in both classes again for 2019 after competing in the Elite 1 class only in 2018.
- Giorgio Maggi will move from ADAC GT Masters to make his debut in the NASCAR Whelen Euro Series. Maggi will drive the No. 50 Elite 2 entry for Hendriks Motorsport.
- Thomas Ferrando will switch teams to Alex Caffi Motorsport after Knauf Racing folded in the off-season. Ferrando will drive the No. 27 Elite 1 entry for the 2019 season.
- 2018 NASCAR PEAK Mexico Series champion Rubén García Jr. is scheduled to make his Euro Series debut in the season opening round at Valencia as part of a driver exchange program between Euro Series and Mexico Series.
- Ander Vilariño returns to the series after a three-year absence. He will drive Racing Engineering's No. 48 car on a full-time basis.
- Jennifer Jo Cobb is scheduled to compete for the majority of the season in the No. 10 Racing-Total car in the Elite 2 class. Due to a clash in schedule with the NASCAR Gander Outdoors Truck Series, Cobb is currently not listed to take part in Franciacorta and Most, although she is currently in talks with the team for a chance to compete in all Euro Series races.
- 2018 Mini Challenge UK champion Ant Whorton-Eales is scheduled to make his Euro Series debut with the No. 46 Racing-Total team in Elite 1.
- Tom Boonen, Niels Albert, and Bert Longin was initially announced to share a ride in the No. 11 PK Carsport car in Elite 2 for 2019. Freddy Nordström and Vittorio Ghirelli would also race for the No. 11 team at Brands Hatch and Most respectively, while Niels Albert would be replaced by Barry Maessen on Albert's scheduled debut at Venray.
- Naveh Talor is scheduled to make his Euro Series debut with Solaris Motorsport in the Elite 2 class.
- Fredrik Hemborg is scheduled to make his Euro Series debut in Memphis Racing's No. 77 Camaro. Hemborg will replace Guillaume Deflandre in the team's Elite 2 seat.
- Henri Tuomaala and Ian Eric Wadén are scheduled to make their first full season Euro Series campaign in 2019 with the No. 23 Camaro of Memphis Racing.
- ThorSport Racing driver and 2018 NASCAR Camping World Truck Series Rookie of the Year Myatt Snider will make his Euro Series debut this season, driving Racing Engineering's No. 48 Mustang in the Elite 2 class in conjunction with his part-time Truck Series effort.
- Braxx Racing team owner Jerry de Weerdt will step down from the No. 78 Ford seat in the Elite 1 class to focus on his Elite 2 class campaign. Marc Goossens will replace him in the No. 78 Elite 1 seat.
- Nicolò Rocca is scheduled to make a return to full-time racing in 2019 with PK Carsport. Rocca will replace Anthony Kumpen, who is currently suspended due to failing a drug test during the 2018 24 Hours of Zolder. Partnering with Rocca in the No. 24 seat will be former USF2000 driver Andre Castro, who will make his Euro Series debut this season. Kumpen himself would eventually move to a management role in PK Carsport as he currently works as the team manager for the Euro Series operations of the team.

==== Team changes ====
- Solaris Motorsport will field a car in the Elite 2 class for Israeli driver Naveh Talor in the 2019 season. They previously fielded the No. 12 car in the Elite 1 class only.
- DF1 Racing's #99 car is set to run as a full-time team in 2019. The #99 car was run as a part-time Elite 2 class effort in 2018, with Advait Deodhar driving the car in Brands Hatch and Hockenheim.
- Team Bleekemolen will enter the championship with the No. 69 Mustang for father and son duo Michael and Sebastiaan Bleekemolen. The team also potentially will field a second car if the team can earn enough sponsorship money.
- RDV Competition's No. 18 entry will be renumbered to the No. 36. In addition, the No. 36 entry will use a Chevrolet Camaro chassis instead of a Toyota Camry chassis.
- Alex Caffi Motorsport will expand into a three-car team with the addition of the #27 Mustang to the team after signing a collaboration deal with BVR Motorsport, who fielded the No. 27 team last season.
- Hendriks Motorsport will expand into a two-car team with the addition of the No. 7 Mustang to the team for 2019. The No. 7 team was part of the Belgium Driver Academy team in the 2018 season.
- CAAL Racing will downsize to a two-car team, shutting down the No. 44 and No. 56 team and adding the No. 31 team following a merger between CAAL and Race Art - Blu Mot, who fielded the No. 31 team in the 2018 season.
- Former Formula 2 and European Le Mans Series team Racing Engineering will make their debut in the series. The team will field the No. 48 and No. 88 Mustang for the 2019 season.
- Eric De Doncker's Motorsport 98 returns to the series after a one-year absence.
- Memphis Racing will expand into a two-car team with the addition of the No. 23 Camaro.
- Racers Motorsport will field a third entry with the No. 19 team for the 2019 season. They initially planned to field a third entry in 2018, but ultimately the team would field only two cars.
- Lucas Lasserre's Speedhouse 64 will make their debut in the series, fielding the No. 64 car for the 2019 season.
- Braxx Racing will downsize from a three-car team into a two-car team after the team shut down the No. 91 entry.
- Both Jennifer Jo Cobb Racing and AmD Tuning entered a partnership with Racing-Total for the 2019 season.
- Mishumotors' No. 70 team is set to run full-time in 2019 after the team ran part-time in 2018.
- Knauf Racing did not submit an entry for the 2019 season. It is presumed that the team folded in the off-season.

==== Mid-season changes ====
- Starting from the rounds at Franciacorta, Lasse Sørensen will be driving for the No. 66 Dexwet-df1 Racing team in the Elite 2 class, replacing Advait Deodhar who moved to Speedhouse 64 for Franciacorta before switching teams again to CAAL Racing starting from Brands Hatch onwards.
- On May 14, it was announced that Christophe Bouchut had parted ways from Dexwet-df1 Racing after the Saturday race at Franciacorta, citing personal issues as the cause of leave.
- On May 18, it was announced that Racing-Total's NASCAR Whelen Euro Series operations will be rebranded to Marko Stipp Motorsport. Marko Stipp Motorsport will continue the partnership that Racing-Total had with AmD Tuning.
- During the race week at Most, the No. 27 entry switched teams from Alex Caffi Motorsport to CAAL Racing for the rest of the season. On the same race week, Florian Venturi left Go Fas Racing citing a disagreement between him and team boss Alain Lord Mounir as the cause of leave as Vittorio Ghirelli switched teams from Racers Motorsport to PK Carsport, replacing Andre Castro in the No. 24 team starting from Venray. Castro would move to Marko Stipp Motorsport to drive in the No. 46 team for the rest of the season.
- On July 16, it was announced that PK Carsport will field a third car for Dylan Derdaele and Pol van Pollaert for the final two race weeks of the season at Hockenheim and Zolder. Originally numbered #999, it was later changed to #98 when the Entry List for Hockenheim was released.
- On July 22, it was announced that Guillaume Deflandre would make his Elite 1 debut for Dexwet-df1 Racing for the rounds at Hockenheim and Zolder and was currently working for a full-time return in the 2020 season.

== Rule changes ==
- General Tire will replace BFGoodrich as the official tire supplier on a six-year contract starting from 2019.
- On 3 January 2019, NASCAR announced a series of Whelen Euro Series rule changes for 2019.
  - A maximum of 20 slick tires will be allocated to each driver for all qualifying and race session. Tires used during practice sessions and wet-weather tires will not be counted towards the 20 tire limit.
  - Teams will use a new three-way shock absorber that were developed by Team FJ.
  - A new rear spoiler design, made from transparent polycarbonate and steel, will be used. The new spoiler is also designed to give drivers better visibility.
  - An enhanced technical inspection process system, with support from NASCAR R&D Center, will be used on all races.
  - Elite 2's first qualifying session will have its time increased from 10 minutes to 20 minutes, while the time given at the Superpole qualifying session for Elite 2 weren't changed. All Elite 1 qualifying sessions will have the same amount of time as in previous seasons.

== Schedule ==
NASCAR released the provisional calendar on 2 November 2018.

=== Elite 1 ===
Round		Race title	Track	Date
1	R1	NASCAR GP Spain – Valencia NASCAR Fest	(Spain) Circuit Ricardo Tormo, Valencia	13 April
1	R2	NASCAR GP Spain – Valencia NASCAR Fest	(Spain) Circuit Ricardo Tormo, Valencia	14 April
2	R3	NASCAR GP Italy – American NASCAR Weekend	(Italy) Autodromo di Franciacorta, Castrezzato	11 May
2	R4	NASCAR GP Italy – American NASCAR Weekend	(Italy) Autodromo di Franciacorta, Castrezzato	12 May
3	R5	NASCAR GP UK – American Speedfest VII	(United Kingdom) Brands Hatch (Indy), Swanley	1 June
3	R6	NASCAR GP UK – American Speedfest VII	(United Kingdom) Brands Hatch (Indy), Swanley	2 June
4	R7	NASCAR GP Czech Republic – OMV MaxxMotion NASCAR Show	(Czech Republic) Autodrom Most, Most	29 June
4	R8	NASCAR GP Czech Republic – OMV MaxxMotion NASCAR Show	(Czech Republic) Autodrom Most, Most	30 June
5	R9	NASCAR GP Netherlands – American Car Fest	(Netherlands) Raceway Venray, Venray	14 July
6	R10	NASCAR GP Germany – American Fan Fest Semi-finals	(Germany) Hockenheimring (National), Hockenheim	21 September
6	R11	NASCAR GP Germany – American Fan Fest Semi-finals	(Germany) Hockenheimring (National), Hockenheim	22 September
7	R12	NASCAR GP Belgium – American Festival NASCAR Finals	(Belgium) Circuit Zolder, Heusden-Zolder	5 October
7	R13	NASCAR GP Belgium – American Festival NASCAR Finals	(Belgium) Circuit Zolder, Heusden-Zolder	6 October

Oval/Speedway
Road Course/Street Circuit

=== Elite 2 ===
Round		Race title	Track	Date
1	R1	NASCAR GP Spain – Valencia NASCAR Fest	(Spain) Circuit Ricardo Tormo, Valencia	13 April
1	R2	NASCAR GP Spain – Valencia NASCAR Fest	(Spain) Circuit Ricardo Tormo, Valencia	14 April
2	R3	NASCAR GP Italy – American NASCAR Weekend	(Italy) Autodromo di Franciacorta, Castrezzato	11 May
2	R4	NASCAR GP Italy – American NASCAR Weekend	(Italy) Autodromo di Franciacorta, Castrezzato	12 May
3	R5	NASCAR GP UK – American Speedfest VII	(United Kingdom) Brands Hatch (Indy), Swanley	1 June
3	R6	NASCAR GP UK – American Speedfest VII	(United Kingdom) Brands Hatch (Indy), Swanley	2 June
4	R7	NASCAR GP Czech Republic – OMV MaxxMotion NASCAR Show	(Czech Republic) Autodrom Most, Most	29 June
4	R8	NASCAR GP Czech Republic – OMV MaxxMotion NASCAR Show	(Czech Republic) Autodrom Most, Most	30 June
5	R9	NASCAR GP Netherlands – American Car Fest	(Netherlands) Raceway Venray, Venray	13 July
6	R10	NASCAR GP Germany – American Fan Fest Semi-finals	(Germany) Hockenheimring (National), Hockenheim	21 September
6	R11	NASCAR GP Germany – American Fan Fest Semi-finals	(Germany) Hockenheimring (National), Hockenheim	22 September
7	R12	NASCAR GP Belgium – American Festival NASCAR Finals	(Belgium) Circuit Zolder, Heusden-Zolder	5 October
7	R13	NASCAR GP Belgium – American Festival NASCAR Finals	(Belgium) Circuit Zolder, Heusden-Zolder	6 October

Oval/Speedway
Road Course/Street Circuit

=== Calendar changes ===
- NASCAR Euro Series will expand its calendar by adding Autodrom Most as the fourth round for the 2019 season. The races are scheduled to be held on 29 and 30 June.
- Raceway Venray returns to the series after being absent from the calendar in 2018. Unlike the previous events, only one race is going to be held for both classes, with a 75-lap Elite 2 race scheduled for 13 July while a 100-lap Elite 1 race is scheduled for the following day. The Elite 2 race was later shortened into a 70-lap race.
- An All-Star event titled the "All-Star Time Attack" is initially scheduled to be held at a street circuit in the city of Chinon on 22 and 23 June. This was later revealed to be an exhibition event that will be run as part of the annual Chinon Classic car meet.
- All Elite 1 races, with the exception of the Elite 1 Venray round, will have its total race distance increased by 15 kilometers.

== Results ==
=== Elite 1 ===
Round		Race	Pole position	Fastest lap	Most laps led	Winning driver	Winning manufacturer
1	R1	Valencia NASCAR Fest	(Spain) Ander Vilariño	(Spain) Ander Vilariño	(Spain) Ander Vilariño	(Spain) Ander Vilariño	Ford
1	R2	Valencia NASCAR Fest	(Spain) Ander Vilariño	(Netherlands) Loris Hezemans	(Spain) Ander Vilariño	(Spain) Ander Vilariño	Ford
3	R3	American NASCAR Weekend	(Israel) Alon Day	(Israel) Alon Day	(Israel) Alon Day	(Israel) Alon Day	Chevrolet
3	R4	American NASCAR Weekend	(Israel) Alon Day	(Israel) Alon Day	(Israel) Alon Day	(Israel) Alon Day	Chevrolet
3	R5	American Speedfest VII	(Belgium) Stienes Longin	(France) Frédéric Gabillon	(Belgium) Stienes Longin	(Israel) Alon Day	Chevrolet
3	R6	American Speedfest VII	(France) Frédéric Gabillon	(Netherlands) Loris Hezemans	(France) Frédéric Gabillon	(France) Frédéric Gabillon	Chevrolet
4	R7	OMV MaxxMotion NASCAR Show	(Italy) Nicolò Rocca	(Italy) Nicolò Rocca	(Netherlands) Loris Hezemans	(Italy) Nicolò Rocca	Chevrolet
4	R8	OMV MaxxMotion NASCAR Show	(Italy) Nicolò Rocca	(Italy) Nicolò Rocca	(Netherlands) Loris Hezemans	(Netherlands) Loris Hezemans	Ford
5	R9	American Car Fest	(Canada) Jacques Villeneuve	(Canada) Jacques Villeneuve	(Canada) Jacques Villeneuve	(Netherlands) Loris Hezemans	Ford
6	R10	American Fan Fest Semi-finals	(Netherlands) Loris Hezemans	(Israel) Alon Day (Note: Loris Hezemans scored the original fastest lap, but he later had his time removed for track limit violations.)	(Netherlands) Loris Hezemans	(Netherlands) Loris Hezemans	Ford
6	R11	American Fan Fest Semi-finals	(Israel) Alon Day	(Italy) Nicolò Rocca	(Netherlands) Loris Hezemans	(Netherlands) Loris Hezemans	Ford
7	R12	American Festival NASCAR Finals	(France) Thomas Ferrando	(Canada) Jacques Villeneuve	(France) Thomas Ferrando	(France) Thomas Ferrando	Ford
7	R13	American Festival NASCAR Finals	(Canada) Jacques Villeneuve	(Belgium) Stienes Longin	(Belgium) Stienes Longin	(Belgium) Stienes Longin	Chevrolet

Oval/Speedway
Road Course/Street Circuit

=== Elite 2 ===
Round		Race	Pole position	Fastest lap	Most laps led	Winning driver	Winning manufacturer
1	R1	Valencia NASCAR Fest	(United States) Myatt Snider	(United States) Myatt Snider	(United States) Andre Castro	(Switzerland) Giorgio Maggi	Ford
1	R2	Valencia NASCAR Fest	(United States) Myatt Snider	(United States) Myatt Snider	(Italy) Nicholas Risitano	(Italy) Nicholas Risitano	Chevrolet
3	R3	American NASCAR Weekend	(France) Florian Venturi	(France) Florian Venturi	(United States) Andre Castro	(Denmark) Lasse Sørensen	Chevrolet
3	R4	American NASCAR Weekend	(France) Florian Venturi	(France) Florian Venturi	(France) Florian Venturi	(France) Florian Venturi	Chevrolet
3	R5	American Speedfest VII	(United States) Andre Castro	(France) Florian Venturi	(France) Florian Venturi	(Denmark) Lasse Sørensen	Chevrolet
3	R6	American Speedfest VII	(France) Florian Venturi	(France) Florian Venturi	(United States) Andre Castro	(Denmark) Lasse Sørensen	Chevrolet
4	R7	OMV MaxxMotion NASCAR Show	(Switzerland) Giorgio Maggi	(Switzerland) Giorgio Maggi	(Switzerland) Giorgio Maggi	(Switzerland) Giorgio Maggi	Ford
4	R8	OMV MaxxMotion NASCAR Show	(Switzerland) Giorgio Maggi	(Switzerland) Giorgio Maggi	(Denmark) Lasse Sørensen	(Denmark) Lasse Sørensen	Chevrolet
5	R9	American Car Fest	(Switzerland) Giorgio Maggi	(Czech Republic) Martin Doubek	(Italy) Vittorio Ghirelli	(Italy) Vittorio Ghirelli	Chevrolet
6	R10	American Fan Fest Semi-finals	(Switzerland) Giorgio Maggi	(Switzerland) Giorgio Maggi	(Switzerland) Giorgio Maggi	(Switzerland) Giorgio Maggi	Ford
6	R11	American Fan Fest Semi-finals	(Switzerland) Giorgio Maggi	(Switzerland) Giorgio Maggi	(Denmark) Lasse Sørensen	(Denmark) Lasse Sørensen	Chevrolet
7	R12	American Festival NASCAR Finals	(Switzerland) Giorgio Maggi	(Denmark) Lasse Sørensen	(Denmark) Lasse Sørensen	(Denmark) Lasse Sørensen	Chevrolet
7	R13	American Festival NASCAR Finals	(Denmark) Lasse Sørensen	(Switzerland) Giorgio Maggi	(Denmark) Lasse Sørensen	(Denmark) Lasse Sørensen	Chevrolet

Oval/Speedway
Road Course/Street Circuit

== Standings ==
Points are awarded to drivers and team using the current point system used in Monster Energy NASCAR Cup Series, NASCAR Xfinity Series, and NASCAR Gander Outdoors Truck Series, excluding the Stage and Race Winner bonus points. For the final two races in Hockenheim and Zolder, double points are awarded. In addition, the driver that gained the most positions in a race will receive bonus championship points. Should a driver competes in all 9 races between Valencia and Venray, then only the best 8 results of those 9 races were counted towards the Championship.

Position	1	2	3	4	5	6	7	8	9	10	11	12	13	14	15	16	17	18	19	20	21	22	23	24	25	26	27	28	29	30	31	32	33	34	35	36	37	38	39	40	DNS	MPG
Points	40	35	34	33	32	31	30	29	28	27	26	25	24	23	22	21	20	19	18	17	16	15	14	13	12	11	10	9	8	7	6	5	4	3	2	1	1	1	1	1	1	4

=== Elite 1 ===
(key) Bold - Pole position awarded by fastest qualifying time (in Race 1) or by previous race's fastest lap (in Race 2). Italics - Fastest lap. * – Most laps led. ^ – Most positions gained.

Pos	Driver	(Spain) VAL		(Italy) FRA		(United Kingdom) BRH		(Czech Republic) MOS		(Netherlands) VEN	(Germany) HOC		(Belgium) ZOL		Points
1	(Netherlands) Loris Hezemans	7	3	4	2	9	12	(19)*	1*	1	**1***	1*	5	6	551 (569)
2	(Belgium) Stienes Longin	2	2	8	4	**2***	2	2	2	(13)	25	18	3	1*	502 (526)
3	(Italy) Nicolò Rocca	5	5	6	5	3	9	**1**	(**11**)	2	2	2	24	8^	499 (525)
4	(Israel) Alon Day	3	4	**1***	**1***	1	3	20	(22)	8	14	**26**	6	2	473 (488)
5	(Spain) Ander Vilariño	**1***	**1***	25	6	(26)	5	10	9	4	23	14	10^	12	463 (474)
6	(Italy) Gianmarco Ercoli	(25)	21	7	19	7	7	7	16	15	4	3	4	5	452 (464)
7	(France) Thomas Ferrando	(29)	9^	14	25	14^	13	3	4	17	3	6	**1***	20	451 (459)
8	(Canada) Jacques Villeneuve	11	(25)	3	3	15	8	22	19	**3***	5	7	14	**7**	431 (443)
9	(France) Ulysse Delsaux	16	(23)	15	11	13	14	11	5	7^	9	10	11	11	429 (443)
10	(France) Romain Iannetta	24	7	(26)	9	6	6	18	3	6	21	4	13	13	427 (438)
11	(Sweden) Alexander Graff	10	(20)	13^	10	12	4	9	8	18	18	8	19	14	408 (425)
12	(France) Frédéric Gabillon	8	6	18	(26)	11	**1***	17	21	5	6	5	23	DNS	394 (405)
13	(Italy) Francesco Sini	12	19	9	7	DNS	11	6	18		11	12	16	9	388
14	(Spain) Salvador Tineo Arroyo	(20)	8	19	13	16	15	16	7^	9	10	15	20	17	383 (400)
15	(Finland) Henri Tuomaala	19	17	12	(20)	17	16	8	12	10	20	19	15	16	367 (384)
16	(Netherlands) Sebastiaan Bleekemolen	17	12	16	12	(21)	17	5	10	14	24	25	12	22	354 (370)
17	(France) Lucas Lasserre	4	24	17	8	5	24	4	17		7	DNS	25	10	336
18	(Switzerland) Mauro Trione	21^	27	(29)	15^	23	28	15	14	16	22	20	17	18	308 (316)
19	(Japan) Kenko Miura	22	16	22	(27)	19	21	23	20	12	26	17	22	19	303 (313)
20	(Belgium) Marc Goossens	11	11	2	21	4	19						2	3	290
21	(Italy) Dario Caso	(DNS)	13	23	16	18	18	21	13	11	12^	27	18	23	265 (266)
22	(Czech Republic) Martin Doubek	14	10	27	DNS			12	6	19	29	21	21	DNS	262
23	(United Kingdom) Alex Sedgwick	6	26	10	22	10	20						7	4	254
24	(Belgium) Guillaume Deflandre										19	11	8	15	190
25	(Germany) Ellen Lohr	23	(28)	21	14	22	23	14^	15	20					148 (157)
26	(Belgium) Dylan Derdaele										28	24	9	21	125
27	(United Kingdom) Scott Jeffs										13	9^			104
28	(Greece) Ioannis Smyrlis										15	16			86
29	(United Kingdom) Ant Whorton-Eales	27	15	Wth	Wth	8	26								72
30	(Germany) Marco Santamaria										16	22			72
31	(Italy) Lorenzo Marcucci										27	13			68
32	(Slovakia) Michaela Dorcikova										17	23			68
33	(Italy) Simone Laureti	DNS	DNS	24	17	24	22	Wth	Wth						63
34	(United States) Eric Fligueiras			20	24	20	25								59
35	(Germany) Daniel Keilwitz										8	DNS			58
36	(France) Christophe Bouchut	9	DNS	11	DNS			DNS^{1}	23^{1}						56
37	(Belgium) Eric De Doncker	26	DNS	Wth	Wth	25	29	13	DNS^{2}						54
38	(Italy) Luigi Ferrara			5	23										46
39	(United States) Bobby Labonte	18	14												42
40	(Mexico) Rubén García Jr.	15	18												41
41	(Denmark) Lasse Sørensen					28	10^	Wth	Wth						40
42	(Monaco) Alex Caffi			28	18										28
43	(Italy) Max Lanza	28	22			Wth	Wth								24
44	(United States) Jennifer Jo Cobb					27	27								20
45	(Spain) Julio Carayol Casas	Wth^{3}	Wth^{3}												2
Pos	Driver	(Spain) VAL		(Italy) FRA		(United Kingdom) BRH		(Czech Republic) MOS		(Netherlands) VEN	(Germany) HOC		(Belgium) ZOL		Points

Notes

- ^{1} – Christophe Bouchut received no championship points during the Most weekend.
- ^{2} – Eric De Doncker received 5 championship points despite being a non-starter.
- ^{3} – Julio Carayol Casas received 1 championship point for non-starting a race despite withdrawing from the Valencia race meeting.

=== Elite 2 ===
(key) Bold - Pole position awarded by fastest qualifying time (in Race 1) or by previous race's fastest lap (in Race 2). Italics - Fastest lap. * – Most laps led. ^ – Most positions gained.

Pos	Driver	(Spain) VAL		(Italy) FRA		(United Kingdom) BRH		(Czech Republic) MOS		(Netherlands) VEN	(Germany) HOC		(Belgium) ZOL		Points
1	(Denmark) Lasse Sørensen			1	3	1^	1	2	1*	7	2	1*	1	**1***	573
2	(Switzerland) Giorgio Maggi	1	7	3	4	(12)	3	**1***	**2**	**5**	**1***	**5**	**2***	2	564 (589)
3	(Italy) Vittorio Ghirelli	2	3	6	5	4	(10)	7	3	1*	25	14^	4	4	488 (515)
4	(India) Advait Deodhar	5	23	5	9	2	6	4	7		10	7	13	6	465
5	(Italy) Nicholas Risitano	(27)	1*	7	16	18	8	8	4	6	6	6	14	7	462 (472)
6	(United States) Myatt Snider	(**23**)	**6**	2	6	10	7	10	5	2	9	10	19	5	458 (472)
7	(Italy) Pierluigi Veronesi	7	8	10	13	9	15	(19)	16	9	5	9	8^	9	457 (475)
8	(Czech Republic) Martin Doubek	3	5	17	DNS			6	20	13	7^	6	3	12	409
9	(Germany) Justin Kunz	(22)	9	4	7	8	14	5	10	11	DNS	21	5	11	406 (421)
10	(Finland) Jesse Vartiainen	(26)	25	19	26	11	11	22	11	8	4	4	21	10	385 (396)
11	(Italy) Alessandro Brigatti	28	26	23	20	5	9	21	9^		22	3	6	3	375
12	(Netherlands) Michael Bleekemolen	10	14	18	(28)	7	20	14	13	10	14	17	10	20	371 (380)
13	(Finland) Ian Eric Wadén	17	15	11^	18	15	18	(18)	12	15	13	13	18	15	371 (390)
14	(Israel) Naveh Talor	12	12	8	15	DNS	16^	17	8		24	11	17	19	350
15	(Italy) Arianna Casoli	16	16	21	25	19	21	15	17		18	15	11	17	332
16	(United Kingdom) Ben Creanor	11	22	25	17	24	17	12	15		8	26	DNS	14^	319
17	(Sweden) Freddie Hemborg	(25)	4	12	14	21	12	9	6	14			7	13	314 (326)
18	(United States) Andre Castro	(24)*	2	22*	2	**14**	2	3	19	4^	23	25			280 (293)
19	(Germany) Mirco Schultis	8^	13	15	24	17	19	13^	14		16	24			257
20	(Greece) Thomas Krasonis	13	11	26	22	6	22	16	21		17	12			255
21	(Switzerland) Hugo de Sadeleer										3	2	15	21	214
22	(Germany) Matthias Hauer					26	24				19	19	12	18	198
23	(Belgium) Pol van Pollaert										11	23	20	8	172
24	(Italy) Max Lanza	4	28	20	27	Wth	Wth				15	20			155
25	(Italy) Moreno di Silvestre			13^{1}	11^{1}						12	16			148
26	(United Kingdom) Scott Jeffs	6	24	28	12^	16	5								135
27	(France) Florian Venturi	21	29	**27**	**1***	3*	**4***	PO	PO						133
28	(Belgium) Jerry de Weerdt	15	10^	14	19	20	25								123
29	(United Kingdom) Shaun Hollamby	18	17	16	21	25	26								99
30	(Belgium) Eric De Doncker	14	18	Wth	Wth	13	DNS	11	DNS^{2}						93
31	(Belgium) Bert Longin	20	21	9	8										90
32	(Finland) Janne Koikkalainen										20	18			72
33	(France) Eric Clément			DNS	23	22	23	20	18						70
34	(Greece) Ioannis Smyrlis										21	22			62
35	(Italy) Claudio Remigio Cappelli			24	10										40
36	(Iran) Meisam Taheri	9	27												38
37	(Sweden) Freddy Nordström					23	13								38
38	(France) Eric Quintal	19	19												36
39	(Netherlands) Barry Maessen									3					34
40	(Italy) Simone Laureti									12					25
41	(United States) Jennifer Jo Cobb	DNS^{2}	20												17
	(Spain) Alfonso de Orléans-Borbón									PO					0
Drivers ineligible for Elite 2 points
	(Belgium) Niels Albert												9	16	-
	(Belgium) Sven van Laere												16	DNS	-
Pos	Driver	(Spain) VAL		(Italy) FRA		(United Kingdom) BRH		(Czech Republic) MOS		(Netherlands) VEN	(Germany) HOC		(Belgium) ZOL		Points

Notes

- ^{1} – The points scored by Moreno di Silvestre at Franciacorta was initially credited to Meisam Taheri in the championship, despite Taheri didn't take part in any of the races at Franciacorta. This inaccuracy was later rectified at Hockenheim, where the points from Franciacorta were correctly credited to di Silvestre in the post-race point standings.
- ^{2} – Eric De Doncker and Jennifer Jo Cobb received 0 championship points despite being a non-starter.

=== Team's Championship (Top 15) ===
Pos	No.	Team	Elite 1 Driver(s)	Elite 2 Driver(s)	Points
1	50	(Netherlands) Hendriks Motorsport	(Netherlands) Loris Hezemans	(Switzerland) Giorgio Maggi	1092
2	24	(Belgium) PK Carsport	(Italy) Nicolò Rocca	(United States) Andre Castro (Italy) Vittorio Ghirelli	980
3	48	(Spain) Racing Engineering	(Spain) Ander Vilariño	(United States) Myatt Snider	928
4	9	(Italy) Racers Motorsport	(Italy) Gianmarco Ercoli	(Italy) Vittorio Ghirelli (Italy) Alessandro Brigatti (Italy) Simone Laureti	928
5	27	(Monaco) Alex Caffi Motorsport 3 (Italy) CAAL Racing 4	(France) Thomas Ferrando	(Italy) Pierluigi Veronesi	902
6	54	(Italy) CAAL Racing	(Israel) Alon Day	(Italy) Arianna Casoli	852
7	11	(Belgium) PK Carsport	(Belgium) Stienes Longin	(Belgium) Bert Longin (Sweden) Freddy Nordström (Italy) Vittorio Ghirelli (Netherlands) Barry Maessen (Belgium) Niels Albert	816
8	23	(Sweden) Memphis Racing	(Finland) Henri Tuomaala	(Finland) Ian Eric Wadén	787
9	77	(Sweden) Memphis Racing	(Sweden) Alexander Graff	(Sweden) Freddie Hemborg (Finland) Janne Koikkalainen	778
10	8	(Italy) Racers Motorsport	(Italy) Dario Caso	(Italy) Nicholas Risitano	778
11	31	(Italy) CAAL Racing	(Switzerland) Mauro Trione	(Iran) Meisam Taheri (Italy) Moreno di Silvestre (India) Advait Deodhar	767
12	12	(Italy) Solaris Motorsport	(Italy) Francesco Sini	(Israel) Naveh Talor	734
13	99	(Austria) Dexwet-df1 Racing	(Germany) Ellen Lohr (Belgium) Guillaume Deflandre	(Germany) Justin Kunz	723
14	2	(Monaco) Alex Caffi Motorsport	(Japan) Kenko Miura	(Finland) Jesse Vartiainen	723
15	66	(Austria) Dexwet-df1 Racing	(France) Christophe Bouchut (Denmark) Lasse Sørensen	(India) Advait Deodhar (Denmark) Lasse Sørensen	711
Pos	No.	Team	Elite 1 Driver(s)	Elite 2 Driver(s)	Points

== See also ==
- 2019 Monster Energy NASCAR Cup Series
- 2019 NASCAR Xfinity Series
- 2019 NASCAR Gander Outdoors Truck Series
- 2019 ARCA Menards Series
- 2019 NASCAR K&N Pro Series East
- 2019 NASCAR K&N Pro Series West
- 2019 NASCAR Whelen Modified Tour
- 2019 NASCAR Pinty's Series
- 2019 NASCAR PEAK Mexico Series
