= Barry Maessen =

Dutch racecar driver (born 1976)

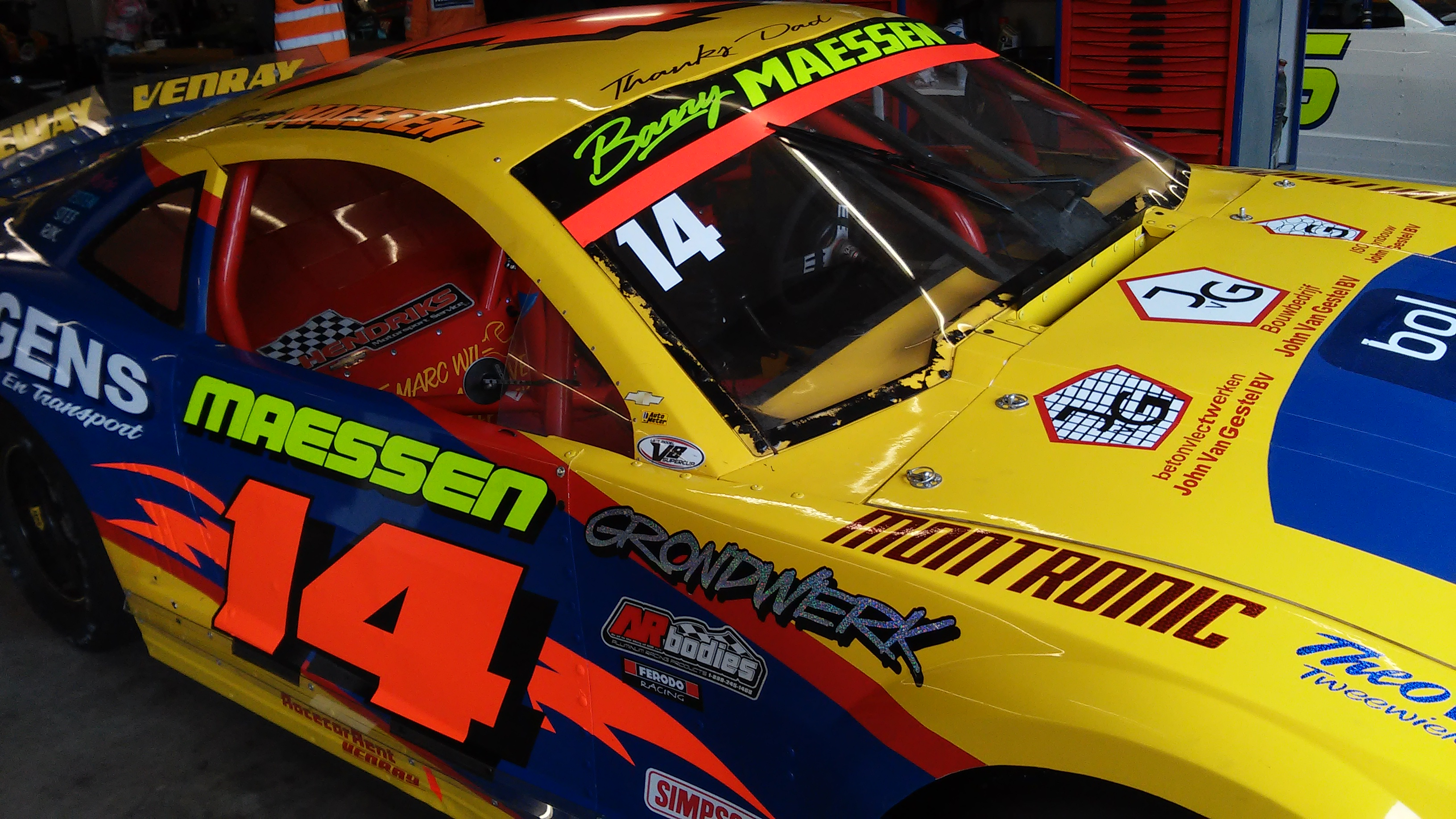
- The car of Barry Maessen at Raceway Venray.
- Nationality: (Netherlands) Dutch
- Born: November 12, 1976 (age 49) Ysselsteyn, Limburg

NASCAR Whelen Euro Series career
- Debut season: 2016
- Current team: PK Carsport
- Car number: 11

Previous series
- 2014-present 2011-2014 2012 2004-2010 2000-2012: LMV8 SuperCup; Dutch Supercar Challenge; Raceway Venray BRL V6; BRL V6; Hot Rods

Championship titles
- 2012: Dutch Supercar Challenge GT

Barry Maessen (born November 12, 1976, in Ysselsteyn) is a Dutch racecar driver. Maessen is the son of BriSCA F1 racer, circuit developer and entrepreneur Harry Maessen. The Dutch driver will be the first Dutch racing driver in the NASCAR Whelen Euro Series.

== Racing career ==
=== Oval racing ===
After starting in motocross, Maessen started his racing career in the Saloon stockcars and BriSCA F2. For the 2000 season the Dutch driver raced a Peugeot 205 in the Hot Rods class at the short oval of Raceway Venray. After winning the trackchampionship in 2001, Maessen switched to a Peugeot 206 for the 2002 season. The Dutch driver raced the Peugeot until 2008 when he switched to a Volkswagen Corrado until 2012. The 2012 season proved to be Maessen's last season in the Hot rod class. As the "Circuit de Peel" was heavily renovated into the current Raceway Venray, Maessen focussed on the half mile oval.

=== Circuit racing ===
Harry Maessen introduced the BRL V6 series for 2004 his son Barry joined the series racing one of the Ford Mondeo silhouettes. Maessen achieved many top-ten finishes in the strong field. His first podium in the series came in 2010 when the class was included as a separate class in the Dutch Supercar Challenge. For 2011 and 2012, the BRL V6 raced at the renewed Raceway Venray. Maessen continued in the Dutch Supercar Challenge racing a Dodge Viper SRT10. With Van Berlo Racing, Maessen won five races and won the GT class of the championship. After a partial season in 2013, Maessen joined Team Raceway Venray with their self developed Vicora V8. Maessen gave the car its maiden win at Circuit Zolder.

=== Stock car racing ===
With the introduction of the BRL V6 on the half mile oval at Raceway Venray, Maessen joined the series and took two third places in the championship. The following seasons, Maessen graduated into the LMV8 SuperCup late model stock car series. In the 2015 season, he finished second in the championship. For 2016, Maessen joined the NASCAR Whelen Euro Series.

== Personal life ==
Maessen graduated from the Hub van Doornecollege in 1993 studying auto engineering.

Since April 2025, Maessen is confirmed to be in a relationship with Dutch singer Sieneke.

== Motorsport results ==
=== NASCAR ===
(key) (Bold – Pole position awarded by qualifying time. Italics – Pole position earned by points standings or practice time. * – Most laps led.)

==== Whelen Euro Series - Elite 1 ====
NASCAR Whelen Euro Series - Elite 1 results
Year	Team	No.	Make	1	2	3	4	5	6	7	8	9	10	11	12	NWES	Points
2016	Raceway Venray	14	Chevrolet	VAL	VAL	VEN; 5	VEN; 3	BRH	BRH	TOU	TOU	ADR	ADR	ZOL; 12	ZOL; 17	24th	204

==== Whelen Euro Series - Elite 2 ====
NASCAR Whelen Euro Series - Elite 2 results
Year	Team	No.	Make	1	2	3	4	5	6	7	8	9	10	11	12	13	NWES	Points
2019	PK Carsport	11	Chevrolet	VAL	VAL	FRA	FRA	BRH	BRH	MOS	MOS	VEN; 3	HOC	HOC	ZOL	ZOL	39th	34
