= Jerry de Weerdt =

Belgian racing driver

Jerry de Weerdt (born 3 August 1969) is a Belgian professional stock car racing driver who last competed part-time in the NASCAR Whelen Euro Series Elite 2 division. De Weerdt made 54 Elite 2 division starts between 2014 and 2019, and made a total of 41 Elite 1 division starts between 2013 and 2018. In 2017, he made his NASCAR K&N Pro Series West debut at the Kern County Raceway Park in Bakersfield, California in a No. 14 car owned by Jesse Iwuji's Patriot Motorsports Group team, where he finished 22nd. In January 2018, de Weerdt tested an ARCA Racing Series car at the Daytona International Speedway for Patriot, and was later approved by ARCA to compete in the race there the following month, in which he drove for the same team and would finish eleventh in the event.

== Motorsports career results ==
=== NASCAR ===
(key) (Bold – Pole position awarded by qualifying time. Italics – Pole position earned by points standings or practice time. * – Most laps led.)

==== K&N Pro Series West ====
NASCAR K&N Pro Series West results
Year	Team	No.	Make	1	2	3	4	5	6	7	8	9	10	11	12	13	14	NKNPSWC	Pts	Ref
2017	Patriot Motorsports Group	14	Ford	KCR	TUS	IRW	IRW	SPO	OSS	CNS	SON	IOW	EVG	DCS	MER	AAS	KCR; 22	58th	22	

=== ARCA Racing Series ===
(key) (Bold – Pole position awarded by qualifying time. Italics – Pole position earned by points standings or practice time. * – Most laps led.)

ARCA Racing Series results
Year	Team	No.	Make	1	2	3	4	5	6	7	8	9	10	11	12	13	14	15	16	17	18	19	20	ARSC	Pts	Ref
2018	Patriot Motorsports Group	38	Chevy	DAY; 11	NSH	SLM	TAL	TOL	CLT	POC	MCH	MAD	GTW	CHI	IOW	ELK	POC	ISF	BLN	DSF	SLM	IRP	KAN	85th	175	
